= Art Deco architecture =

Art Deco in architecture

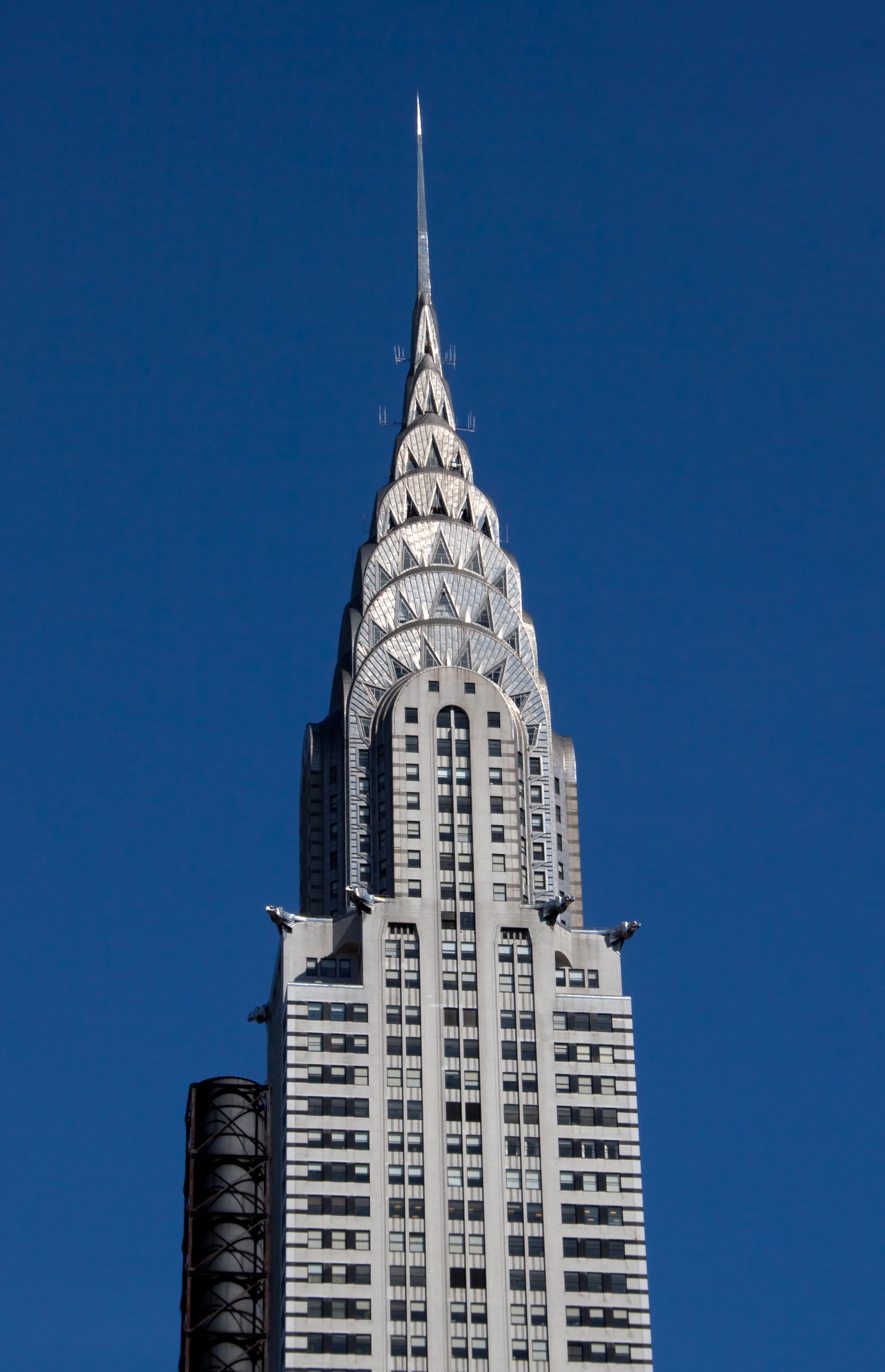
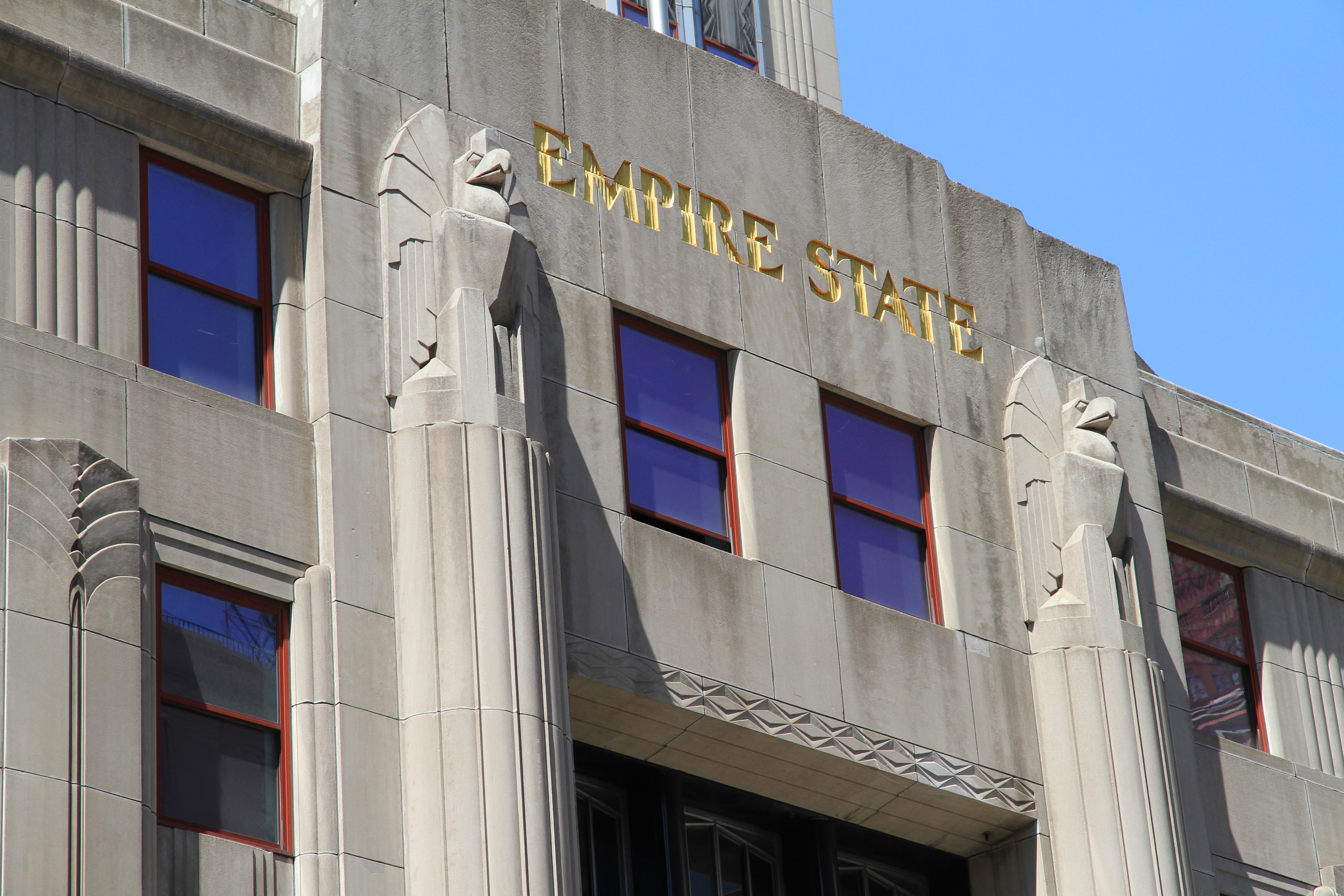
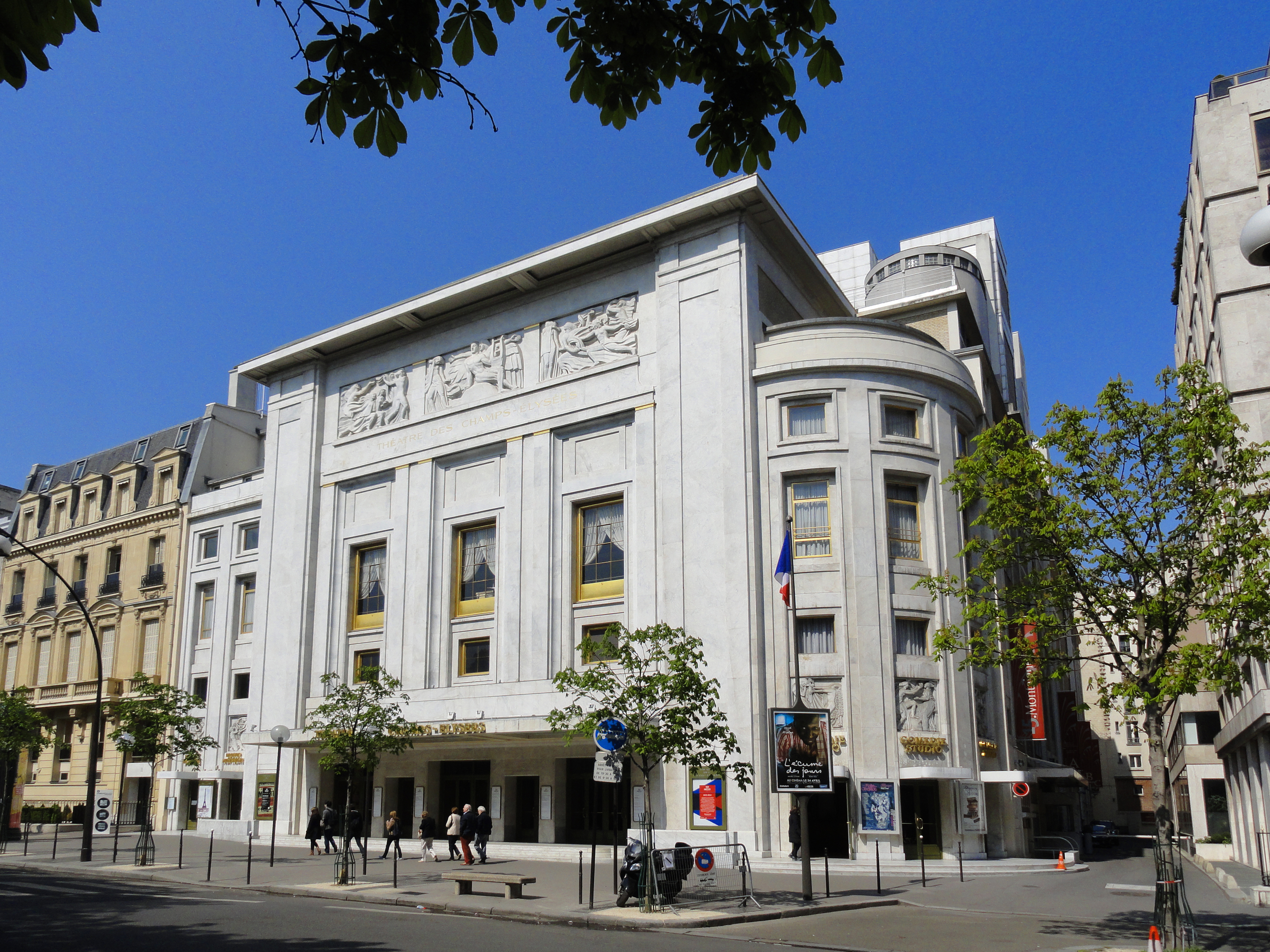
- Top to bottom: Chrysler Building in New York City (1930), Empire State Building (1931), and Théâtre des Champs-Élysées (1913)

Additional media
- Years active: c. 1910s–1950s
- Location: Global

Art Deco, short for the French Arts décoratifs (lit. 'Decorative Arts'), is an architectural style that first appeared in Paris in the 1910s before World War I and flourished internationally throughout the 1920s and 1930s. Art Deco has influenced buildings from skyscrapers to cinemas, bridges, ocean liners, trains, cars, trucks, and buses.

During its heyday, Art Deco represented luxury, glamour, exuberance, and faith in social and technological progress. The movement featured rare and expensive materials such as ebony and ivory, as well as exquisite craftsmanship. It also introduced new materials such as chrome plating, stainless steel, and plastic. In New York, the Empire State Building, Chrysler Building, and other buildings from the 1920s and 1930s are monuments to the style. The largest concentration of Art Deco architecture in the world is in Miami Beach, Florida.

Mike Hope lists 48 other types of labels used in Art Deco architecture.

== Origins ==
=== New materials and technologies ===
New materials and technologies, especially reinforced concrete, were key to the development and appearance of Art Deco. The first concrete house was built in 1853 in the Paris suburbs by François Coignet. In 1877, Joseph Monier introduced the idea of reinforcing with a mesh of iron rods in a grill pattern. In 1893, Auguste Perret built the first concrete garage in Paris, then an apartment building, a house, then, in 1913, the Théâtre des Champs-Élysées.

The theatre was denounced by one critic as the "Zeppelin of Avenue Montaigne", an alleged Germanic influence, copied from the Vienna Secession. Thereafter, the majority of Art Deco buildings were constructed of reinforced concrete, which allowed greater freedom of form and reduced the need for reinforcing pillars and columns. Perret was also a pioneer in covering the concrete with ceramic tiles, both for protection and decoration. The architect Le Corbusier first learned the uses of reinforced concrete while working as a draftsman in Perret's studio.

Other new technologies that were important to Art Deco were new methods in producing plate glass, which was less expensive and allowed much larger and stronger windows, and for mass-producing aluminium, which was used for building and window frames, and later, by Corbusier, Warren McArthur, and others, for lightweight furniture.

=== Vienna Secession and Wiener Werkstätte (1897–1912) ===
The architects of the Vienna Secession (formed 1897), especially Josef Hoffmann, had a notable influence on Art Deco. His Stoclet Palace, in Brussels (1905–1911), was a prototype of the Art Deco style, featuring geometric volumes, symmetry, straight lines, concrete covered with marble plaques, finely-sculpted ornament, and lavish interiors, including mosaic friezes by Gustav Klimt. Hoffmann was also a founder of the Wiener Werkstätte (1903–1932), an association of craftsmen and interior designers working in the new style. This became the model for the Compagnie des arts français, created in 1919, which brought together André Mare and Louis Süe, the first leading French Art Deco designers and decorators.

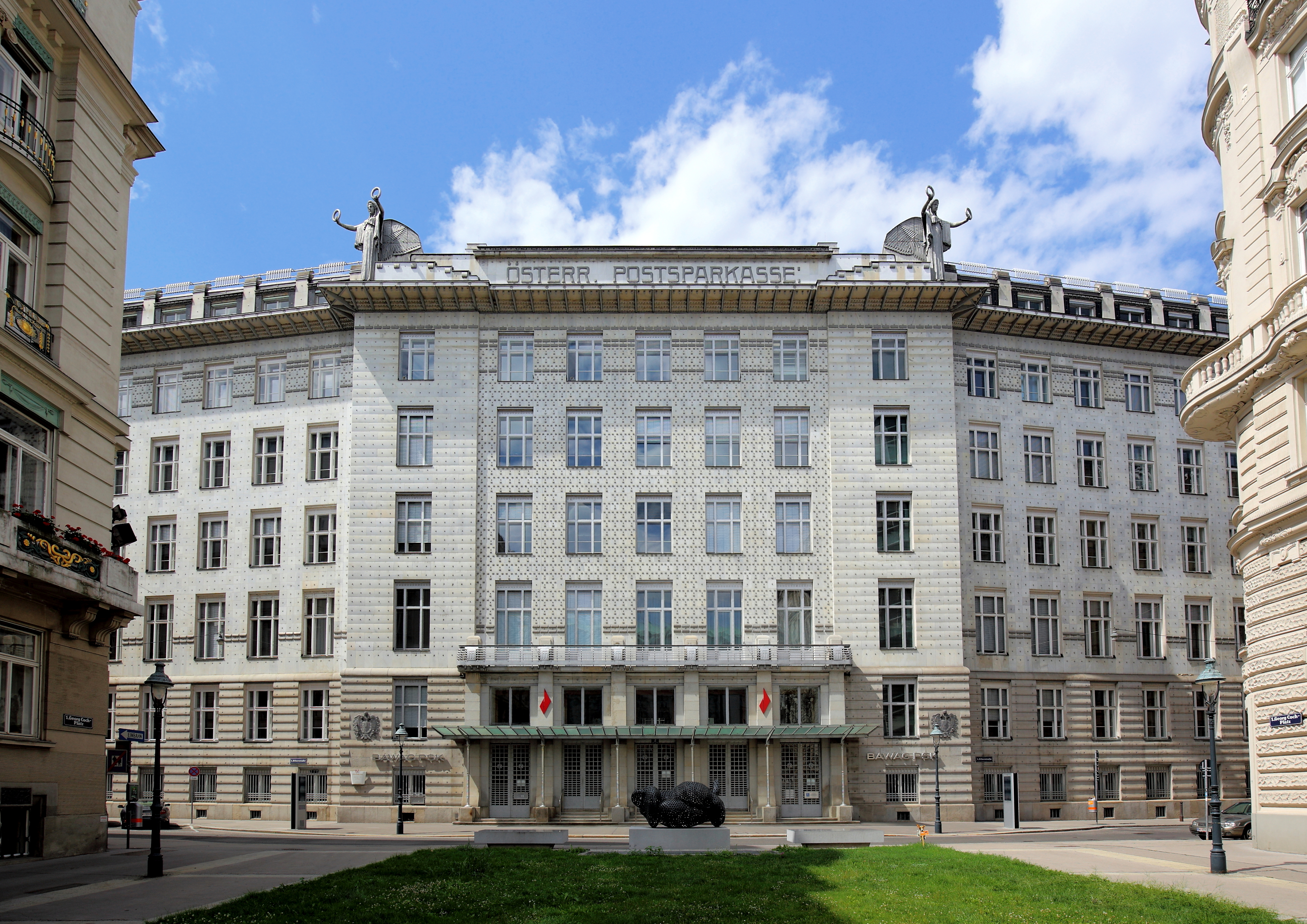
Austrian Postal Savings Bank in Vienna by Wagner (1904–1912)

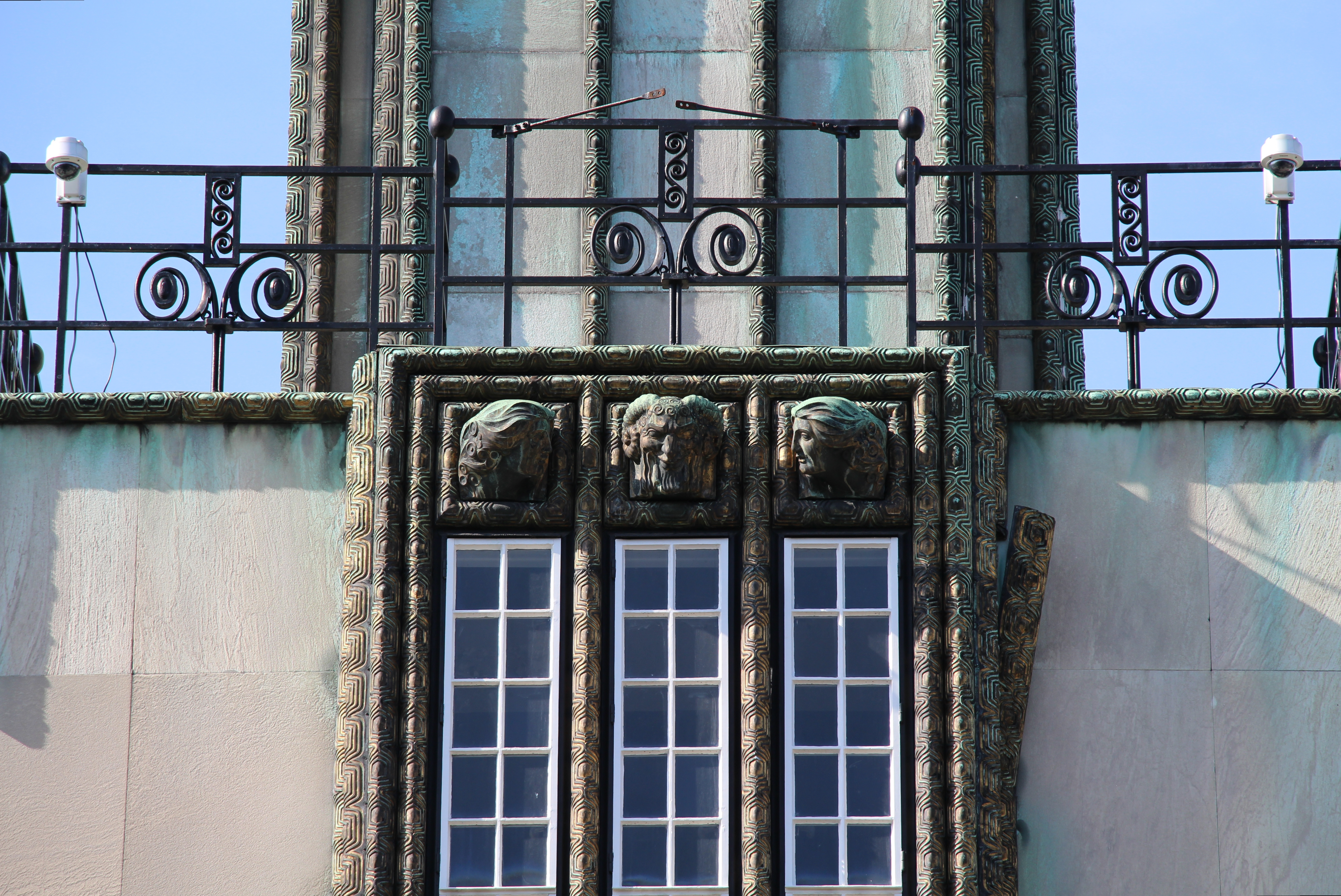
Detail of the Stoclet Palace's façade, made of reinforced concrete faced with marble veneer

=== Théâtre des Champs-Élysées (1910–1913) ===
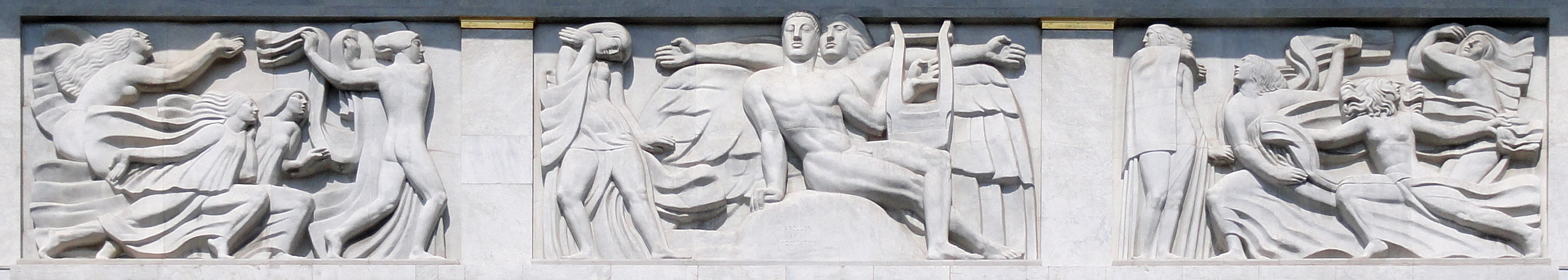
Apollon et sa méditation entourée des 9 muses (Apollo and His Meditation Surrounded by the 9 Muses), bas-relief on the façade of the Théâtre des Champs-Élysées by Bourdelle (1910–1912). This work represents one of the earliest examples of what became known as Art Deco sculpture.

The Théâtre des Champs-Élysées (1910–1913), by Auguste Perret, was the first landmark Art Deco building completed in Paris. Previously, reinforced concrete was only used for industrial and apartment buildings. Perret built the first modern reinforced-concrete apartment building in Paris on rue Benjamin Franklin in 1903–04. Henri Sauvage, another important future Art Deco architect, built another in 1904 at 7, rue Trétaigne (1904).

From 1908 to 1910, the 21-year-old Le Corbusier worked as a draftsman in Perret's office, learning the techniques of concrete construction. Perret's building had a clean rectangular form, geometric decoration, and straight lines, the future trademarks of Art Deco. The décor of the theatre was also revolutionary; the façade was decorated with high reliefs by Antoine Bourdelle, a dome by Maurice Denis, paintings by Édouard Vuillard, and an Art Deco curtain by Ker-Xavier Roussel. The theater became the venue for many of the first performances of the Ballets Russes. Perret and Sauvage became the leading Art Deco architects in Paris in the 1920s.

=== Late Art Deco ===
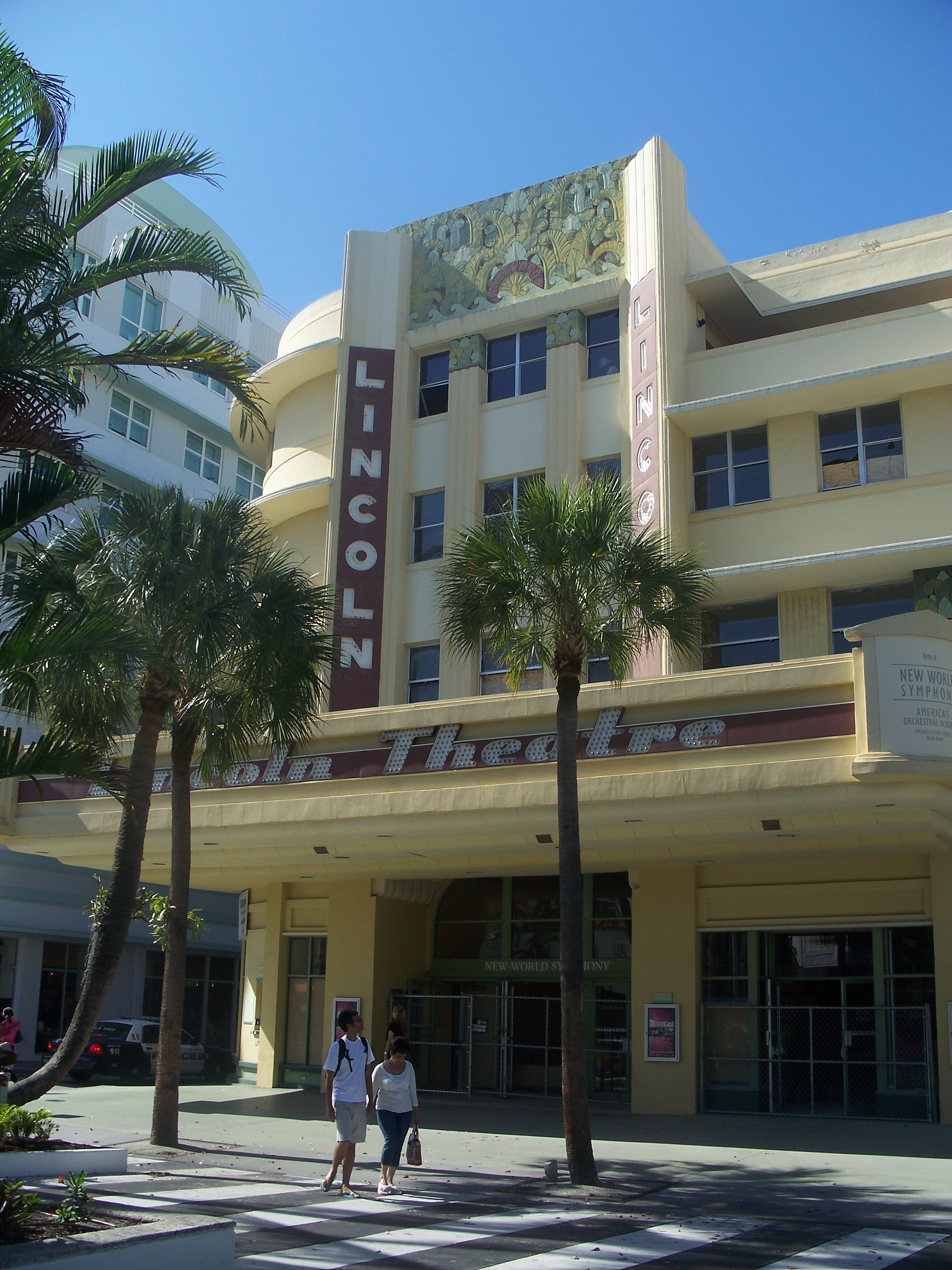
Lincoln Theater in Miami Beach, Florida, by Thomas W. Lamb (1936)

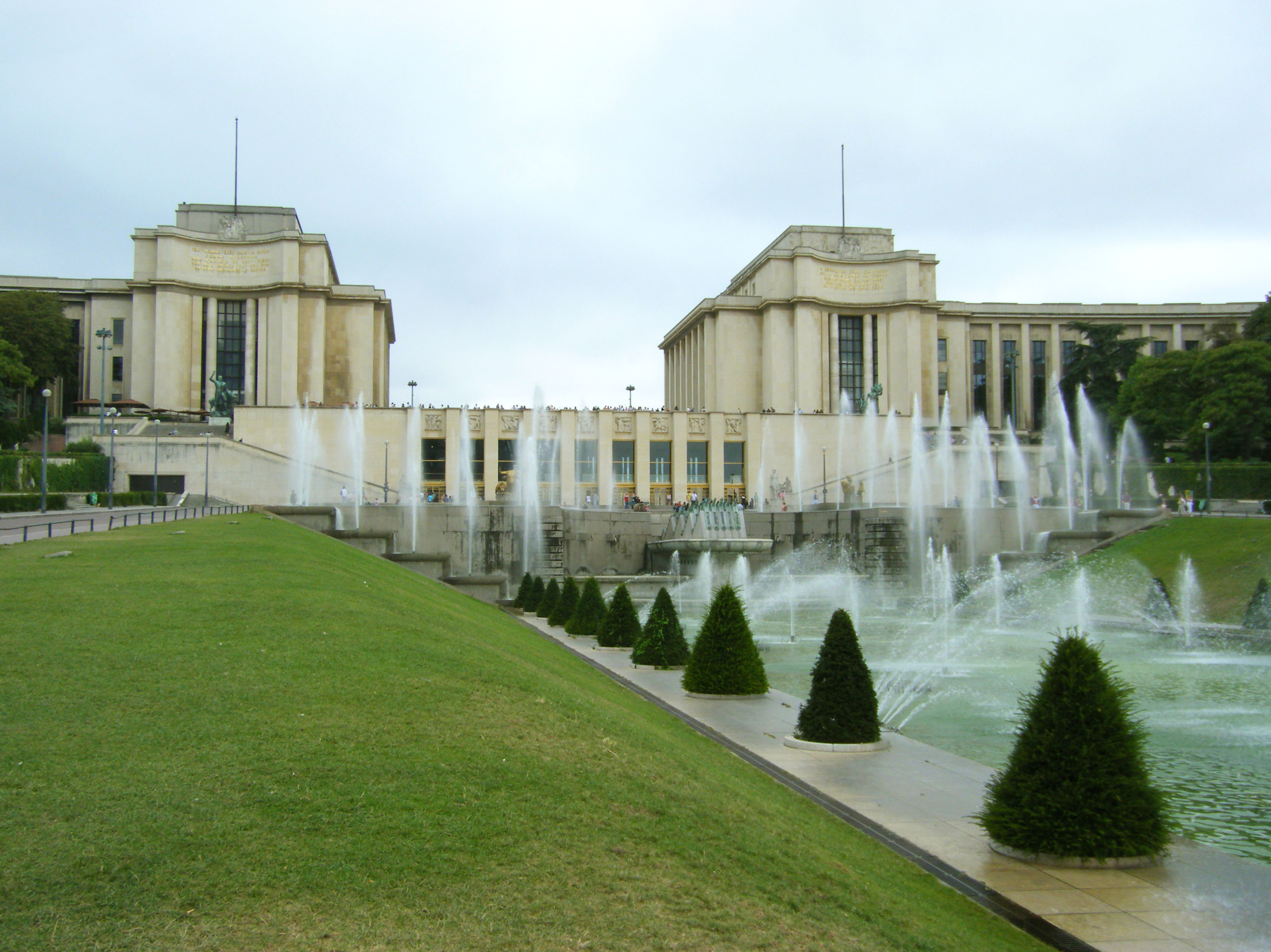
Palais de Chaillot in Paris by Louis-Hippolyte Boileau, Jacques Carlu and Léon Azéma from the 1937 Paris International Exposition

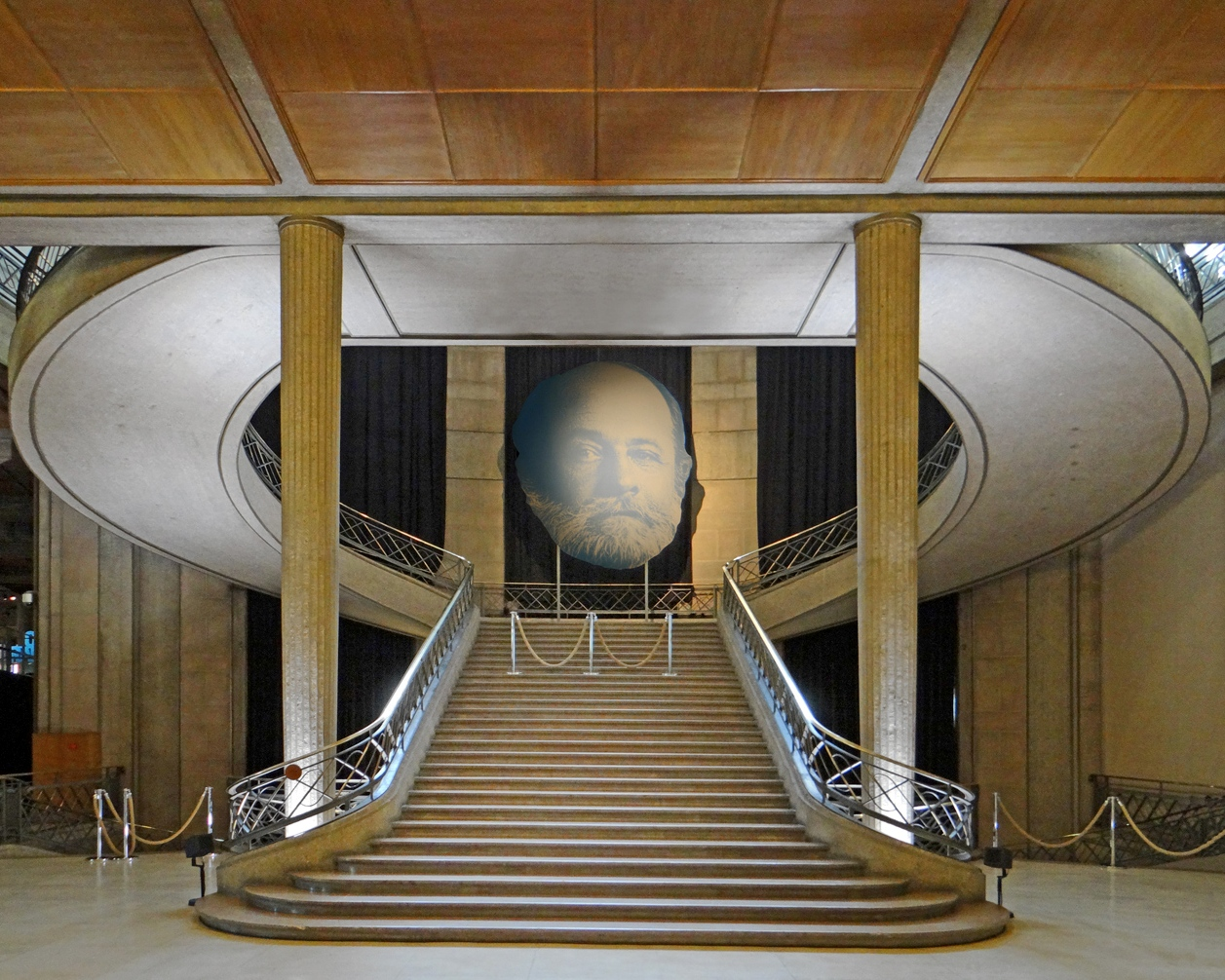
Stairway of the Economic and Social Council in Paris, originally the Museum of Public Works, built for the 1937 Exposition, by Auguste Perret (1937)

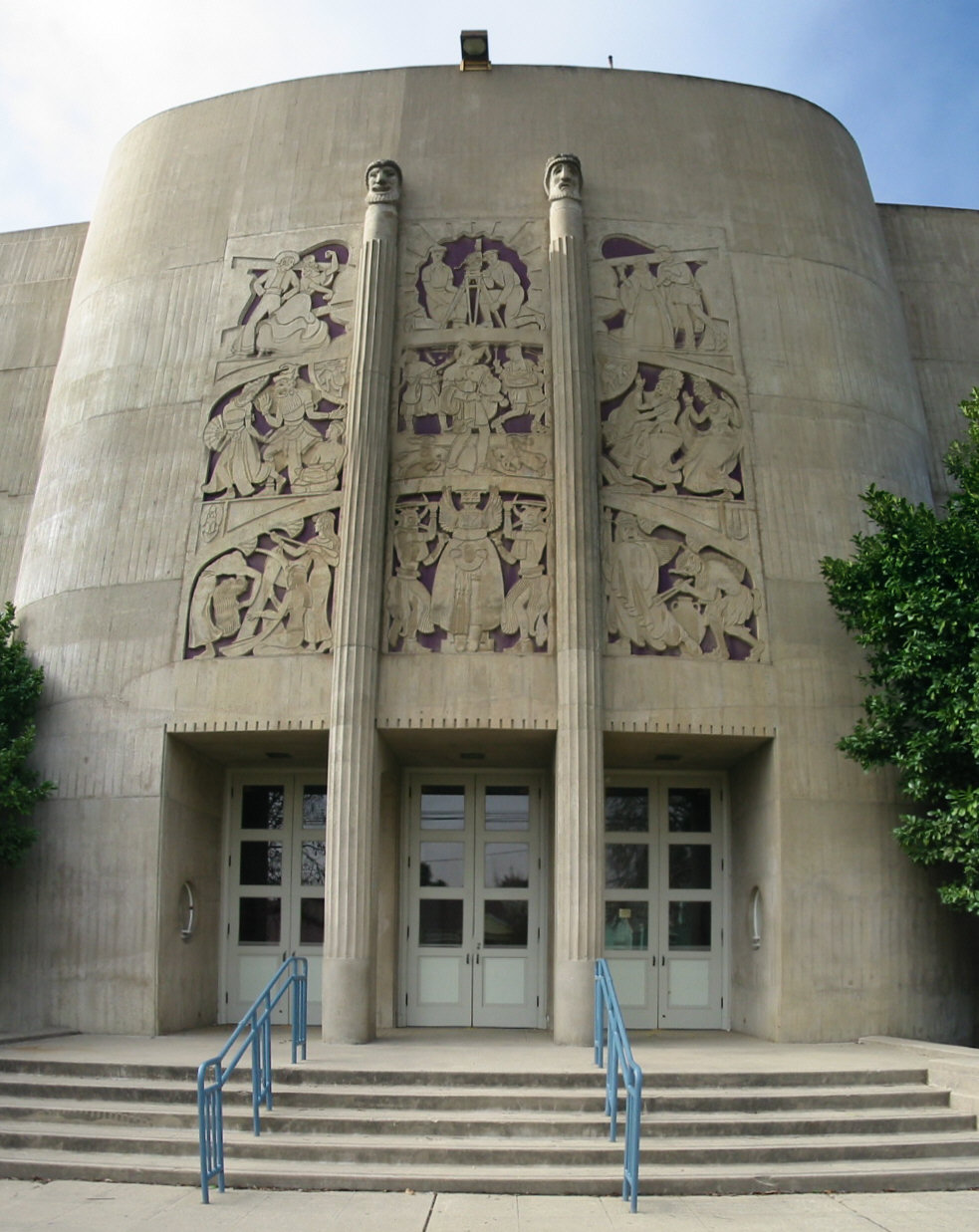
High School in King City, California, built by Robert Stanton for the Works Progress Administration (1939)

In 1925, two different competing schools coexisted within Art Deco: the traditionalists, who had founded the Society of Decorative Artists, which included the furniture designer Emile-Jacques Ruhlmann, Jean Dunand, the sculptor Antoine Bourdelle, and designer Paul Poiret; they combined modern forms with traditional craftsmanship and expensive materials. On the other side were the modernists, who increasingly rejected the past and wanted a style based upon advances in new technologies, simplicity, a lack of decoration, inexpensive materials, and mass production. The modernists founded their own organization, The French Union of Modern Artists, in 1929. Its members included architects Pierre Chareau, Francis Jourdain, Robert Mallet-Stevens, Corbusier, and, in the Soviet Union, Konstantin Melnikov; the Irish designer Eileen Gray; the French designer Sonia Delaunay; and the jewelers Georges Fouquet and Jean Puiforcat. They fiercely attacked the traditional Art Deco style, which they said was created only for the wealthy, and insisted that well-constructed buildings should be available to everyone, and that form should follow function. The beauty of an object or building resided in whether it was perfectly fit to fulfill its function. Modern industrial methods meant that furniture and buildings could be mass-produced, rather than being made by hand.

The Art Deco interior designer Paul Follot defended Art Deco in this way: "We know that man is never content with the indispensable and that the superfluous is always needed...If not, we would have to get rid of music, flowers, and perfumes..!" However, Le Corbusier was a brilliant publicist for modernist architecture; he stated that a house was simply "a machine to live in", and tirelessly promoted the idea that Art Deco was the past and modernism was the future. Le Corbusier's ideas were gradually adopted by architecture schools, and the aesthetics of Art Deco were abandoned. The same features that made Art Deco popular in the beginning, its craftsmanship, rich materials, and ornament, led to its decline. The Great Depression, which began in the United States in 1929 and reached Europe shortly afterward, greatly reduced the number of wealthy clients who could afford furnishings and art objects. In the Depression economic climate, few companies were ready to build new skyscrapers. Even the Ruhlmann firm resorted to producing pieces of furniture in series, rather than individual hand-made items. The last buildings built in Paris in the new style were the Museum of Public Works by Auguste Perret (now the French Economic, Social and Environmental Council), the Palais de Chaillot by Louis-Hippolyte Boileau, Jacques Carlu and Léon Azéma, and the Palais de Tokyo of the 1937 Paris International Exposition; they looked out at the grandiose pavilion of Nazi Germany, designed by Albert Speer, which faced the equally grandiose socialist-realist pavilion of Stalin's Soviet Union.

After World War II, the dominant architectural style became the International Style, pioneered by Le Corbusier and Mies van der Rohe. A handful of Art Deco hotels were built in Miami Beach after World War II, but elsewhere the style largely vanished. In the 1960s, it experienced a modest academic revival, thanks in part to the writings of architectural historians such as Bevis Hillier. In the 1970s, efforts were made in the United States and Europe to preserve the best examples of Art Deco architecture, and many buildings were restored and repurposed. Postmodern architecture, which first appeared in the 1980s, like Art Deco, often includes purely decorative features.

== Styles ==
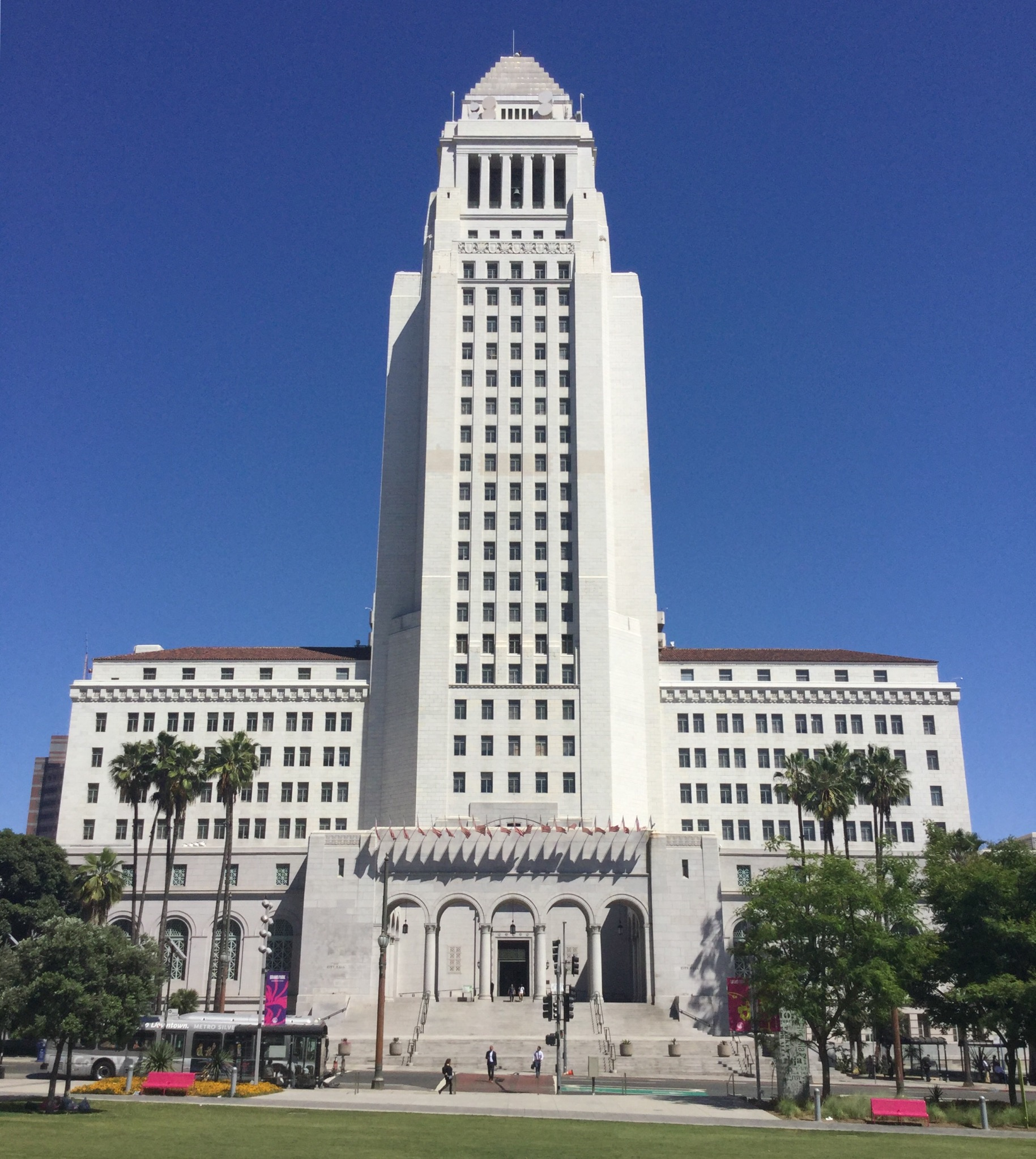
Los Angeles City Hall by John Parkinson, John C. Austin, and Albert C. Martin Sr. (1928)

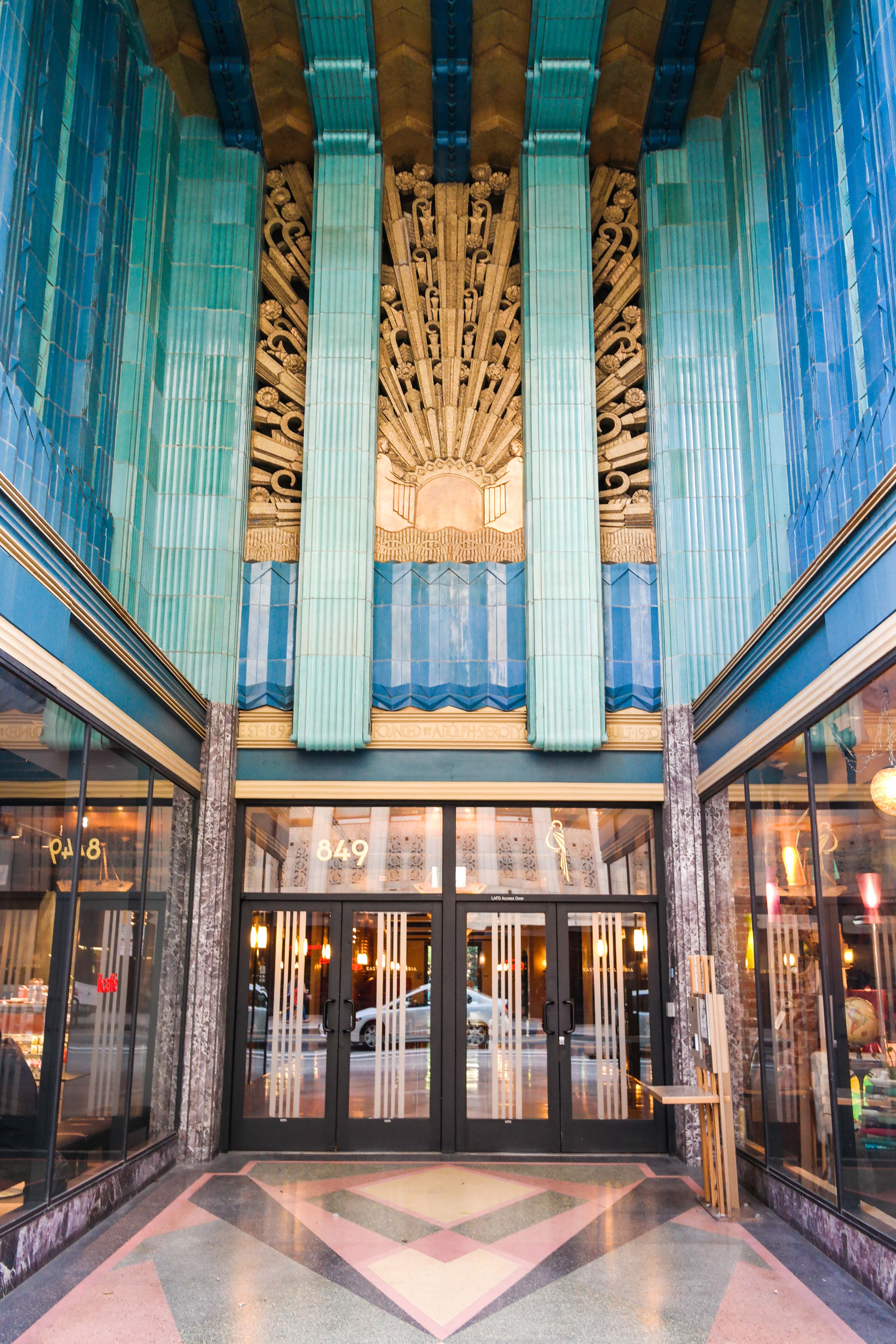
Entrance of the Eastern Columbia Building in Los Angeles, California, by Claud Beelman (1930)

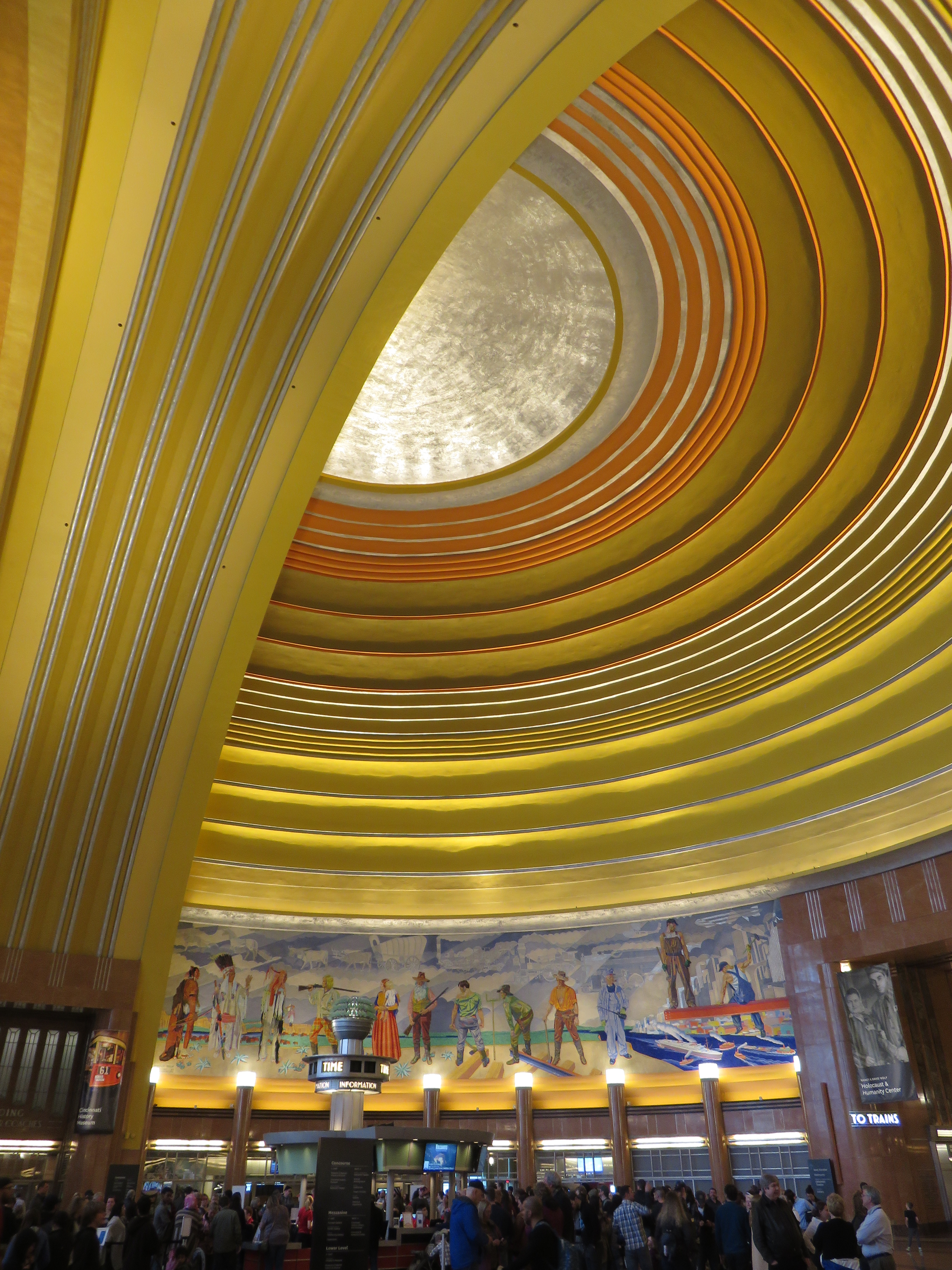
Cincinnati Union Terminal in Cincinnati, Ohio, by Alfred T. Fellheimer and Roland A. Wank (1933)

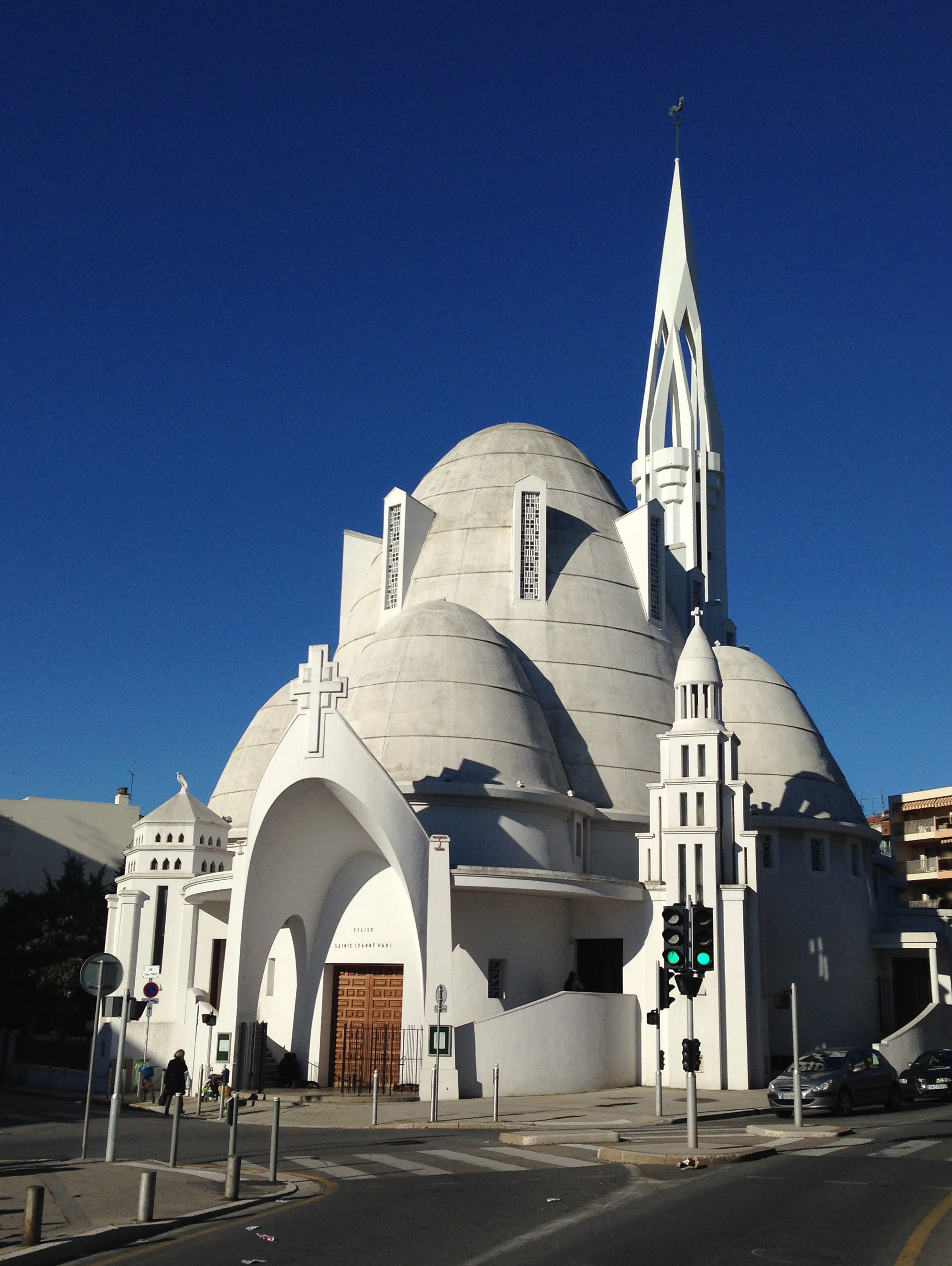
Church of St. Joan of Arc in Nice, France, by Jacques Droz (1934)

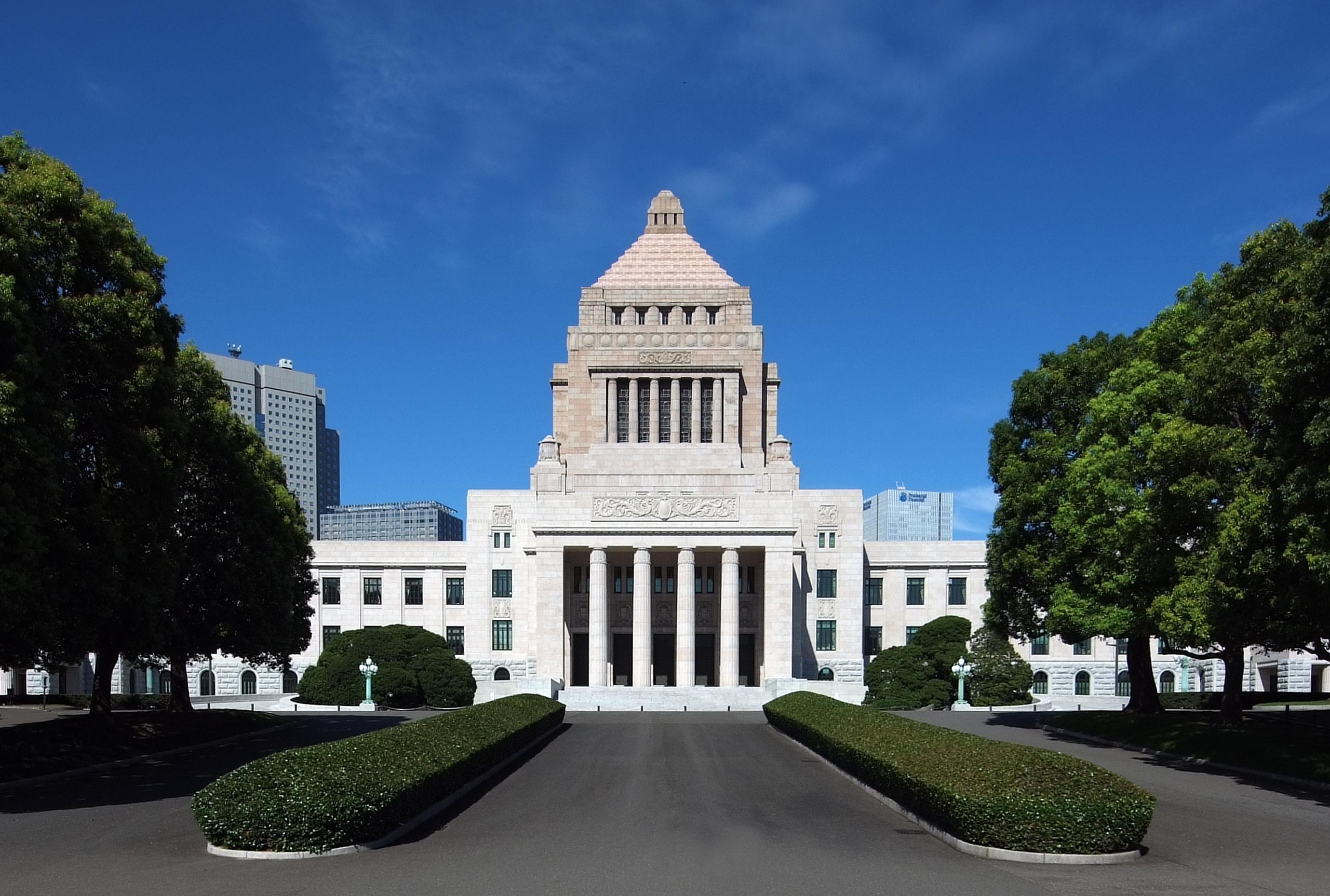
National Diet Building in Tokyo, after a design by Watanabe Fukuzo (1936)

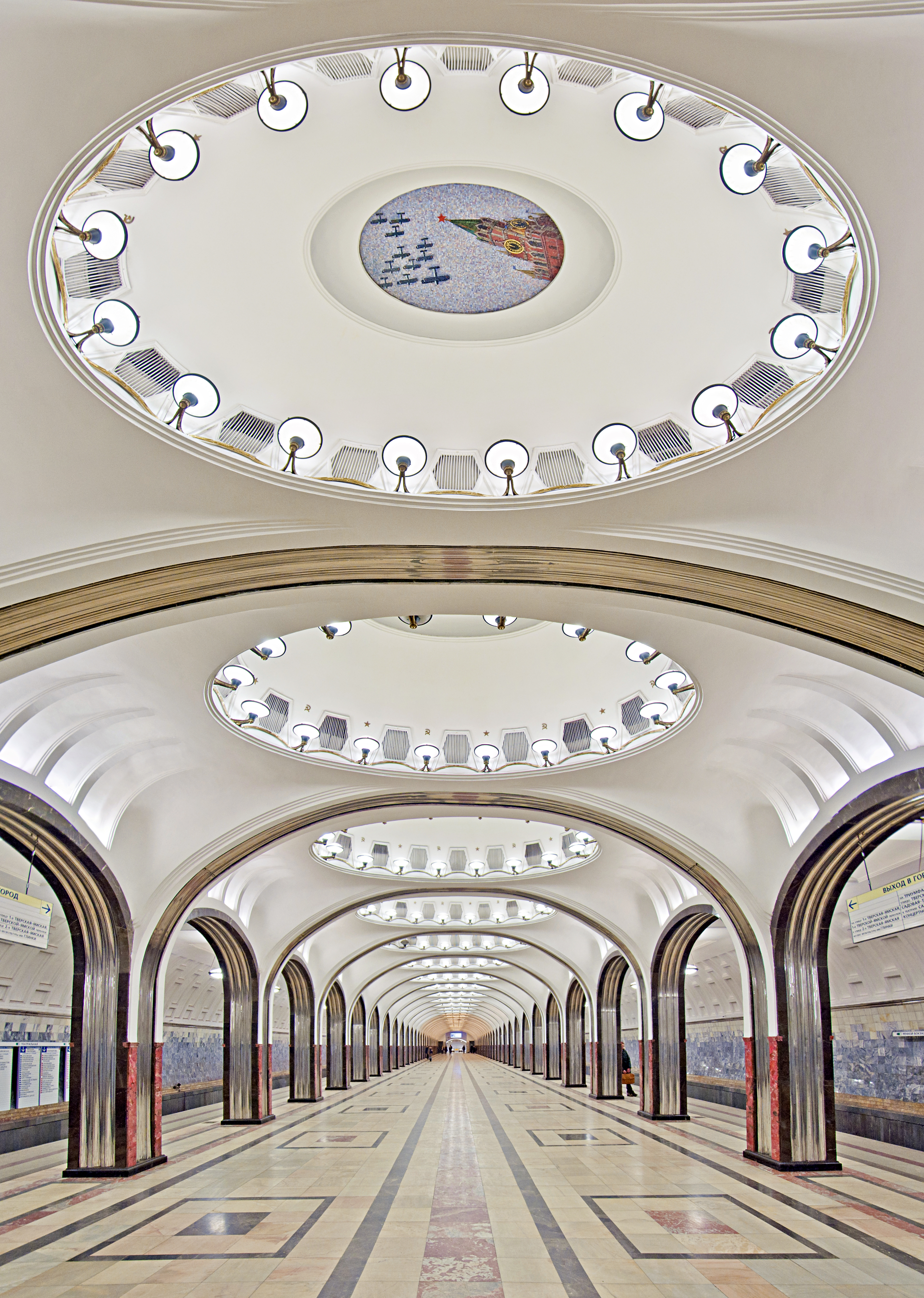
Mayakovskaya Metro Station in Moscow by Alexey Dushkin (1936)

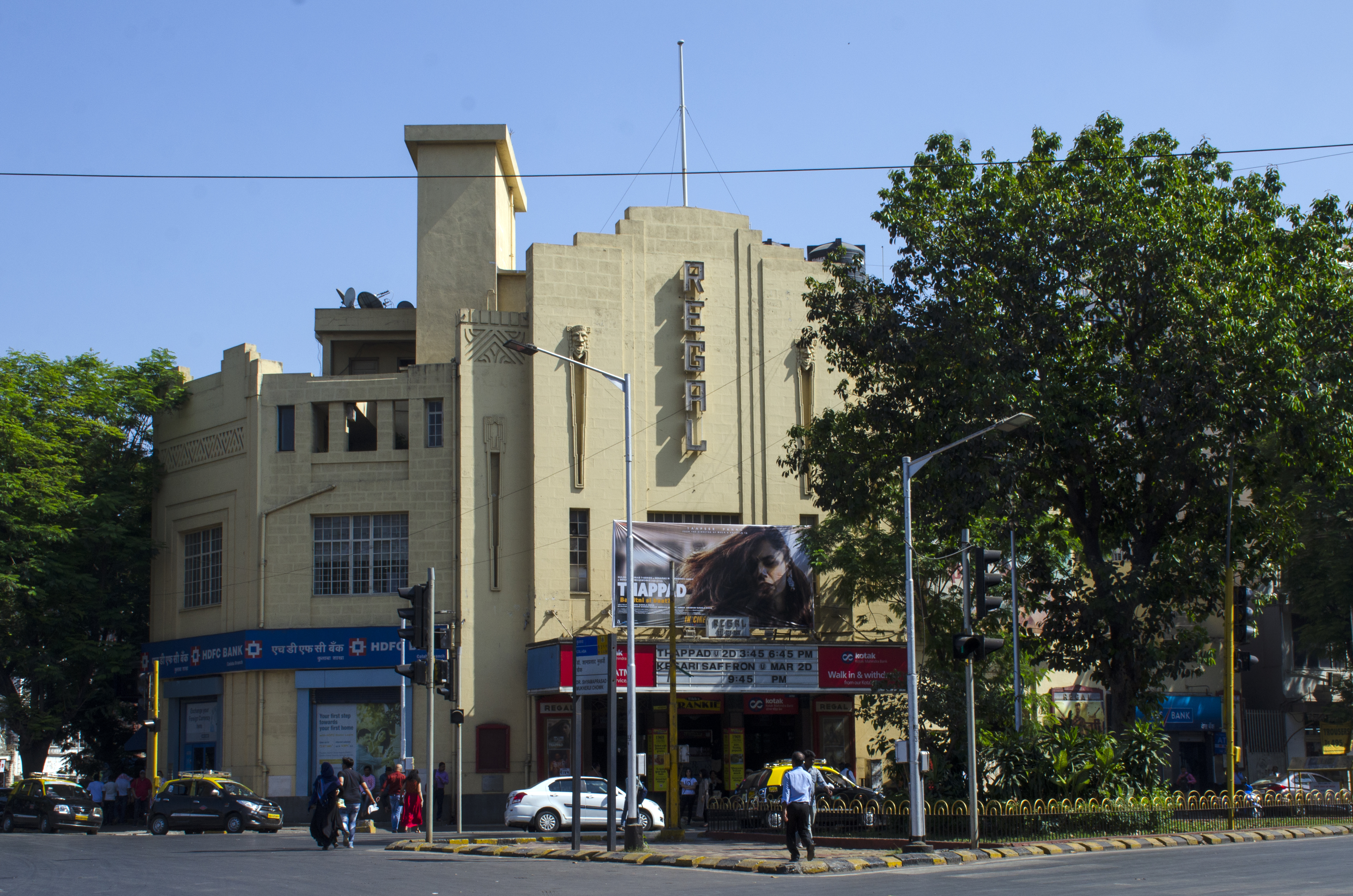
Regal Cinema, Mumbai, India

=== Styles ===
The Art Deco architectural style made its debut in Paris in 1903–04, with the construction of two apartment buildings: one by Auguste Perret on rue Benjamin Franklin and the other by Henri Sauvage on rue Trétaigne. The two young architects used reinforced concrete for the first time in Paris residential buildings; the new buildings had clean lines, rectangular forms, and no decoration on the façades; they marked a clean break with the art nouveau style. Between 1910 and 1913, Perret used his experience in concrete apartment buildings to construct the Théâtre des Champs-Élysées, 15 avenue Montaigne. Between 1925 and 1928, Sauvage constructed the new Art Deco façade of La Samaritaine department store in Paris.

The Art Deco style was not limited to buildings on land; the ocean liner SS Normandie, whose first voyage was in 1935, featured Art Deco design, including a dining room whose ceiling and decoration were made of glass by Lalique.

Art Deco architecture is sometimes classified into three types: Zigzag [Moderne] (aka Jazz Moderne); Classic Moderne; and Streamline Moderne.

==== Zigzag Moderne ====
Zigzag Moderne (aka Jazz Moderne) was the first style to arrive in the United States. "Zigzag" refers to the stepped outline of a skyscraper to exaggerate its height, and was mainly used for large public and commercial buildings, particularly hotels, movie theaters, restaurants, skyscrapers, and department stores.

==== Classic Moderne ====
Classic Moderne has a more graceful appearance and less ornamentation. Classic Moderne is also sometimes referred to as PWA Moderne or Depression Moderne, as it was undertaken by the PWA during the Great Depression.

==== Streamline Moderne ====
In the late 1930s, a new variety of Art Deco architecture became common; it was called Streamline Moderne or simply Streamline, or, in France, the Style Paquebot, or Ocean Liner style. Buildings in the style had rounded corners and long horizontal lines; they were built of reinforced concrete and were almost always white; and they sometimes had nautical features, such as railings and portholes that resembled those on a ship. The rounded corner was not entirely new; it had appeared in Berlin in 1923 in the Mossehaus by Erich Mendelsohn, and later in the Hoover Building, an industrial complex in the London suburb of Perivale. In the United States, it became most closely associated with transport; Streamline moderne was rare in office buildings but was often used for bus stations and airport terminals, such as the terminal at La Guardia airport in New York City that handled the first transatlantic flights, via the PanAm Clipper flying boats; and in roadside architecture, such as gas stations and diners. In the late 1930s, a series of diners, modeled upon streamlined railroad cars, were produced and installed in towns in New England; at least two examples still remain and are now registered historic buildings.

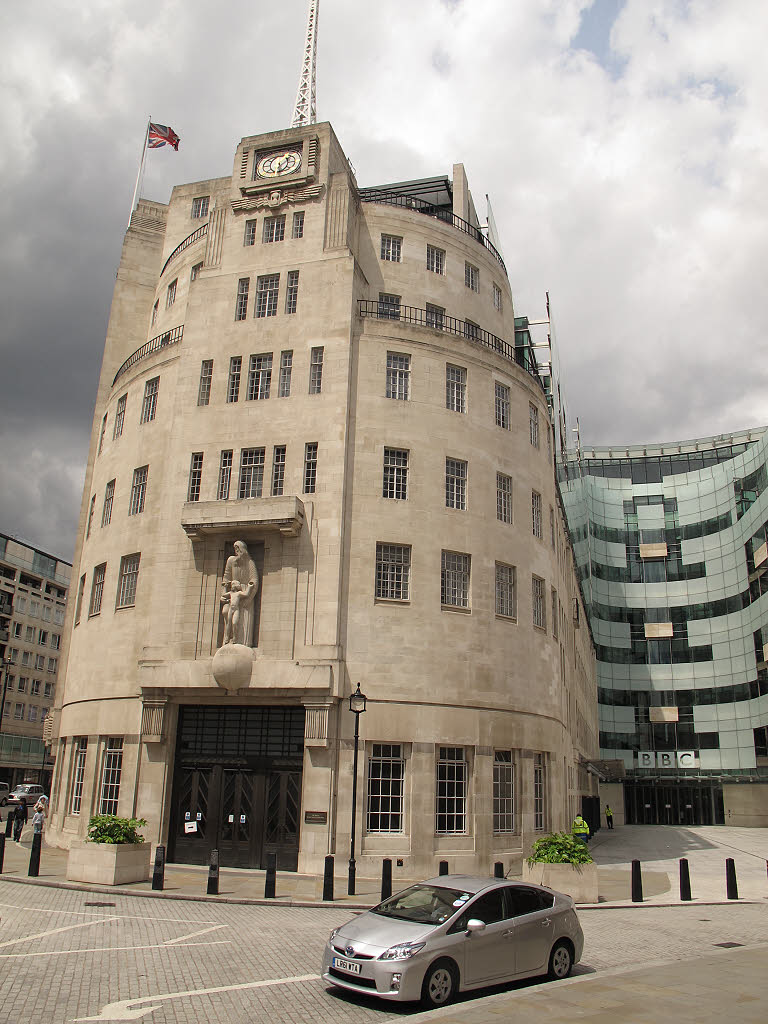
The nautical-style rounded corner of Broadcasting House in London (1931)

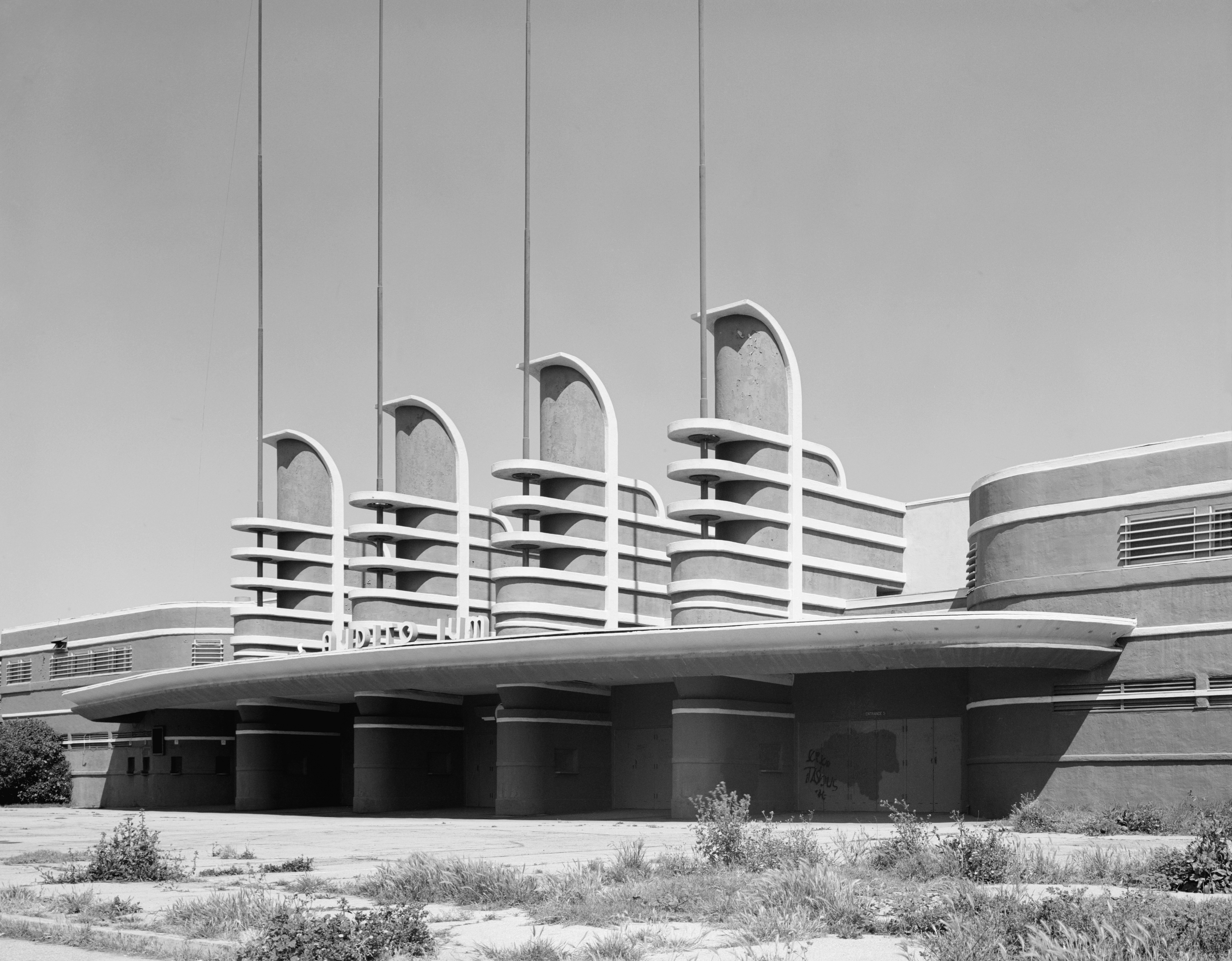
Pan-Pacific Auditorium in Los Angeles, California, by Wurdeman & Becket (1936)

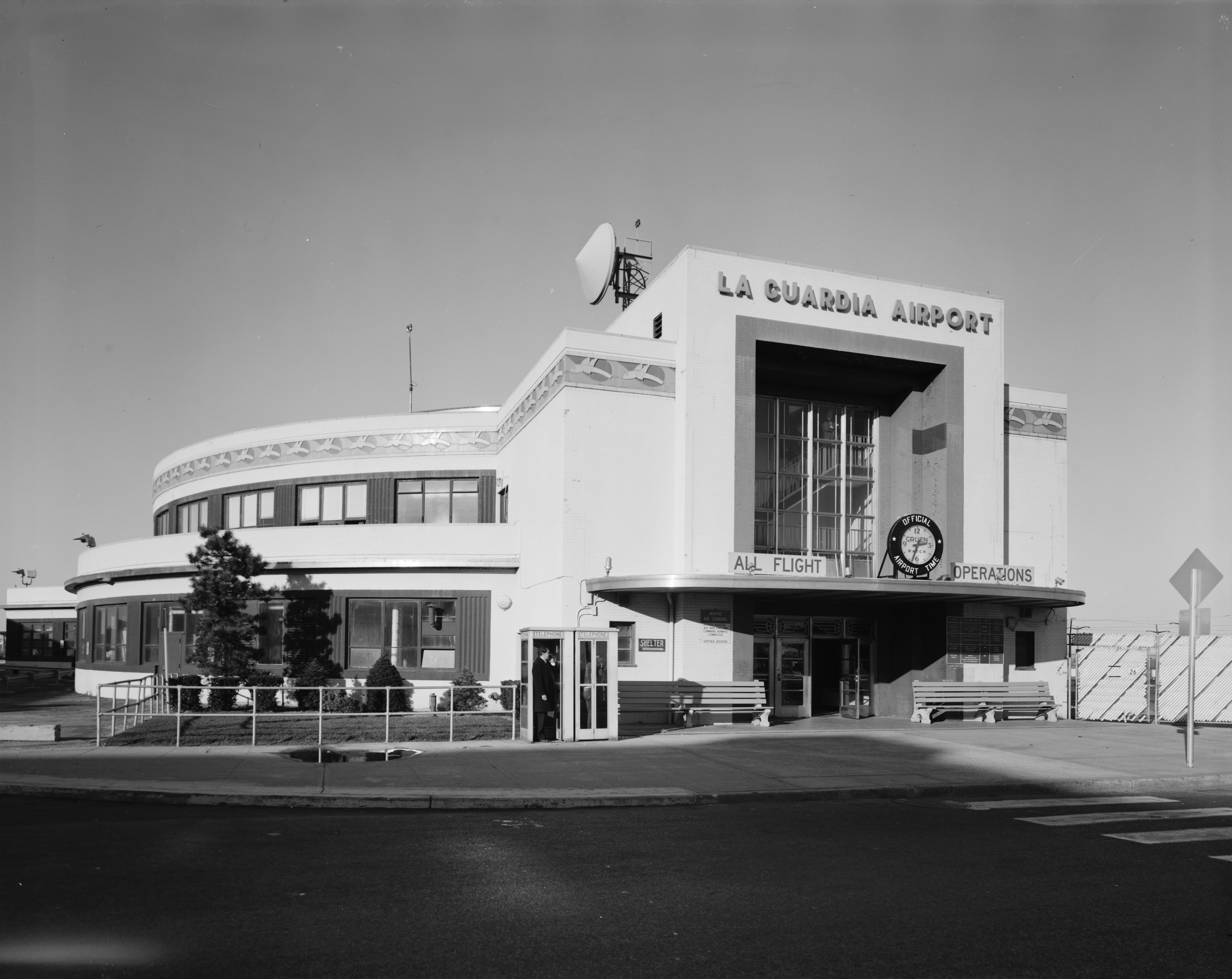
The Marine Air Terminal at La Guardia Airport (1937) was New York City's terminal for the flights of Pan Am Clipper flying boats to Europe.

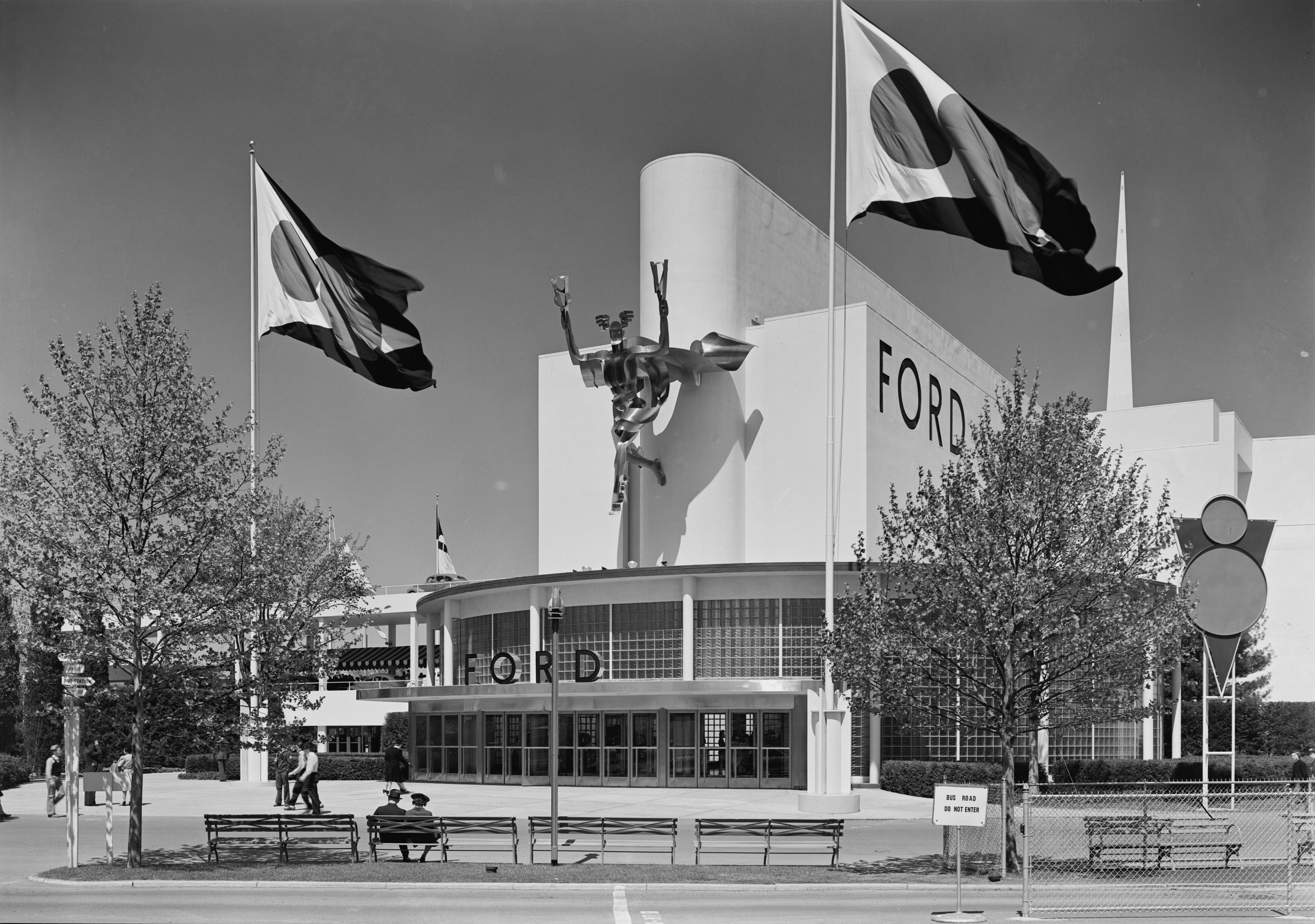
The Ford Pavilion at the 1939 New York World's Fair

=== Building types ===
==== Skyscrapers ====
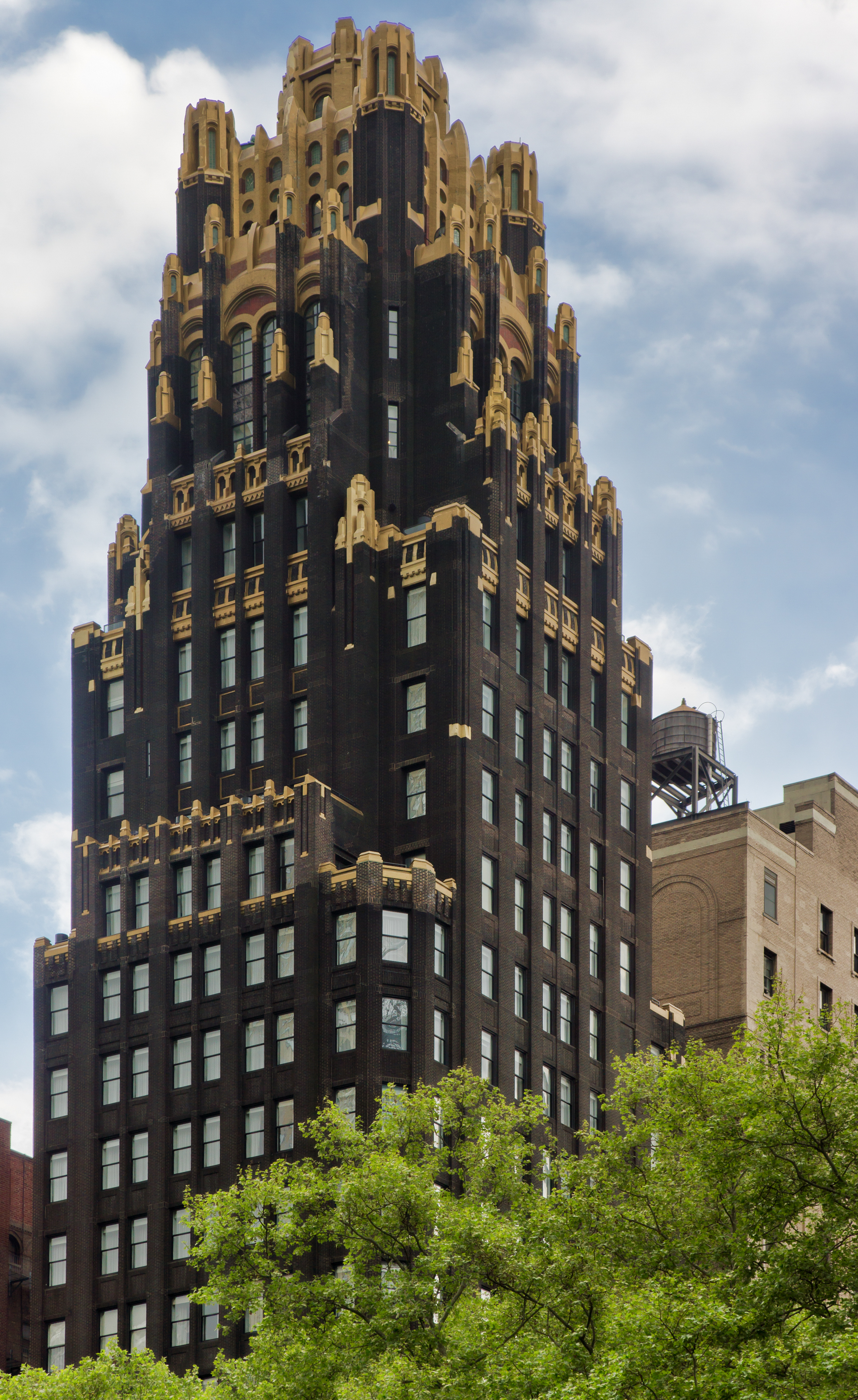
The American Radiator Building in New York City by Raymond Hood (1924)

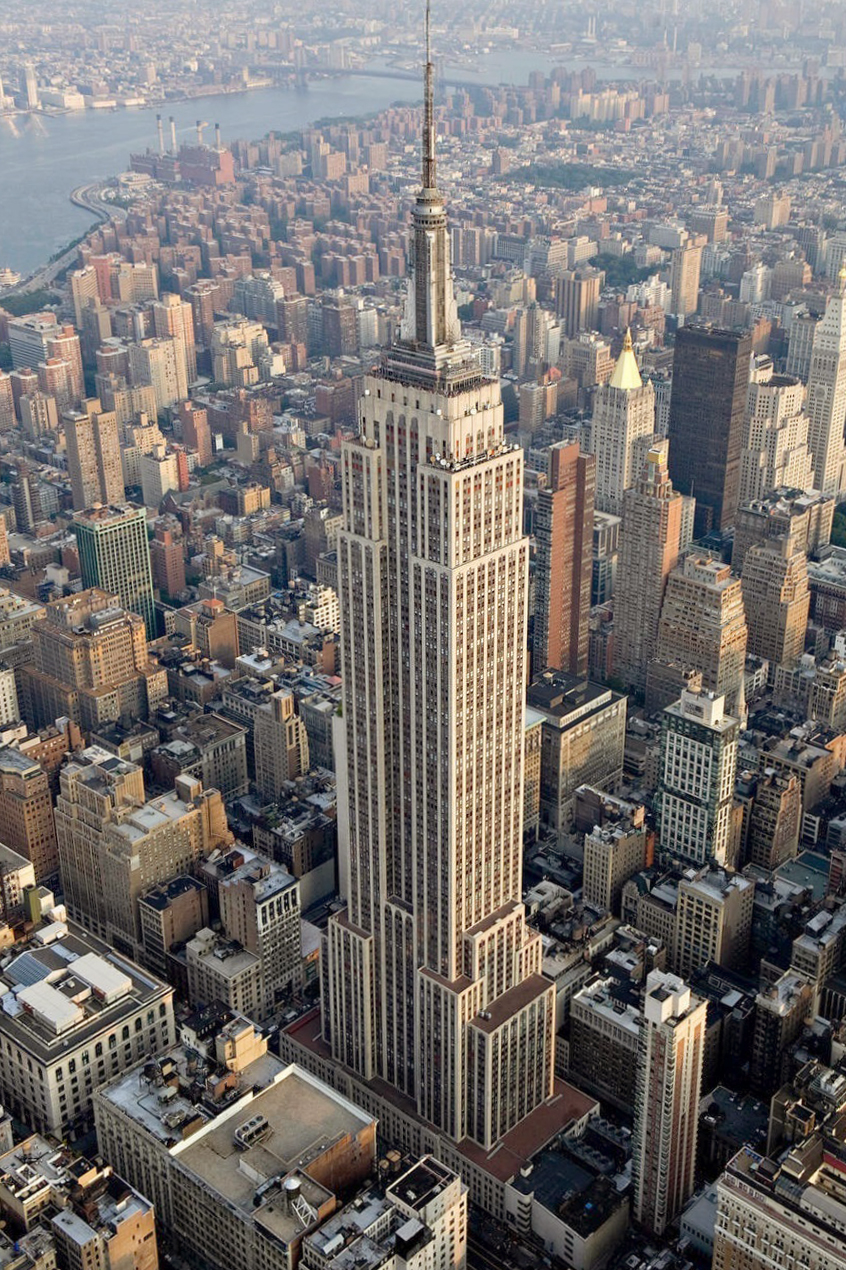
Empire State Building in New York City by Shreve, Lamb & Harmon (1931)

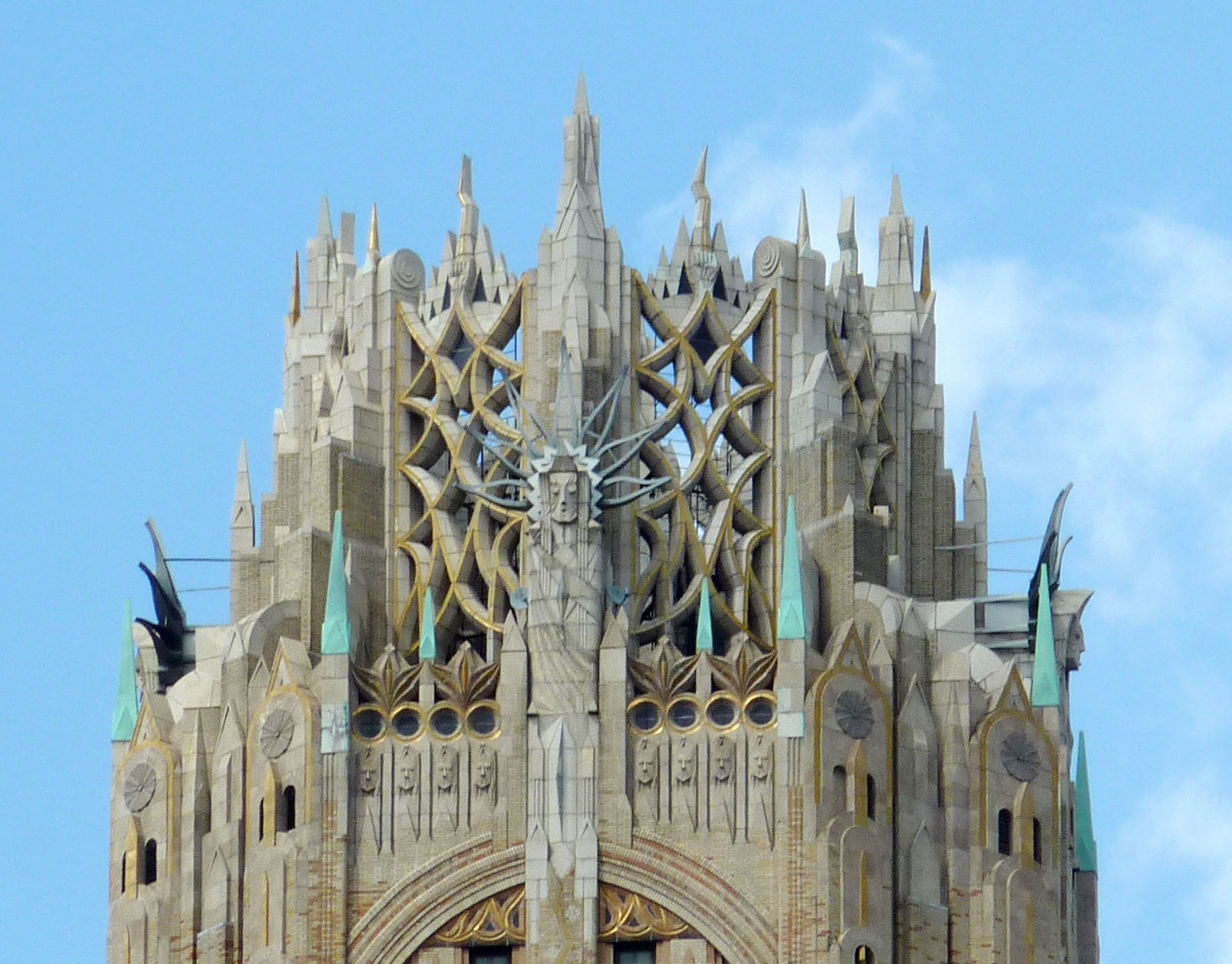
Crown of the General Electric Building (also known as 570 Lexington Avenue) in New York City by Cross & Cross (1933)

American skyscrapers marked the pinnacle of the Art Deco style; they became the tallest and most recognizable modern buildings in the world, designed to project the prestige of their builders through height, shape, color, and dramatic nighttime illumination. The American Radiator Building by Raymond Hood (1924) combined Gothic and Deco modern elements in the design of the building. Black brick on the building's frontage (symbolizing coal) was selected to convey solidity and to give the building a solid mass. Other parts of the façade were covered in gold bricks (symbolizing fire), and the entry was decorated with marble and black mirrors. Another early Art Deco skyscraper was Detroit's Guardian Building, which opened in 1929. Designed by modernist Wirt C. Rowland, the building was the first to employ stainless steel as a decorative element and to use colored designs extensively in place of traditional ornaments.

New York City's skyline was radically changed by the Chrysler Building in Manhattan (completed in 1930), designed by William Van Alen. It was a giant seventy-seven-floor-tall advertisement for Chrysler automobiles. The top was crowned by a stainless steel spire and was ornamented by deco "gargoyles" in the form of stainless steel radiator cap decorations. The base of the tower, thirty-three stories above the street, was decorated with colorful Art Deco friezes, and the lobby was decorated with Art Deco symbols and images expressing modernity.

The Chrysler Building was soon surpassed in height by the Empire State Building by William F. Lamb (1931), in a slightly less lavish Deco style, and the RCA Building (now 30 Rockefeller Plaza) by Raymond Hood (1933), which together completely changed New York City's skyline. The tops of the buildings were decorated with Art Deco crowns and spires covered with stainless steel, and, in the case of the Chrysler building, with Art Deco gargoyles modeled after radiator ornaments, while the entrances and lobbies were lavishly decorated with Art Deco sculpture, ceramics, and design. Similar buildings, though not quite as tall, soon appeared in Chicago and other large American cities. Rockefeller Center added a new design element: several tall buildings grouped around an open plaza, with a fountain in the middle.

Across the Hudson River, Art Deco style skyscrapers were constructed in Newark, New Jersey in the '20s and '30s, namely the New Jersey Bell Headquarters (completed in 1929), designed by Ralph Thomas Walker; the Lefcourt Building (completed in 1930), designed by Frank Grad; and the National Newark Building (completed in 1933), designed by John H. & Wilson C. Ely. John Cotton Dana, head of the Newark Public Library during this period, remarked contemporaneously that these skyscrapers transformed Newark from a "huge, uncouth and unthinking industrial Frankenstein monster into a place of refinement."

==== "Cathedrals of Commerce" ====
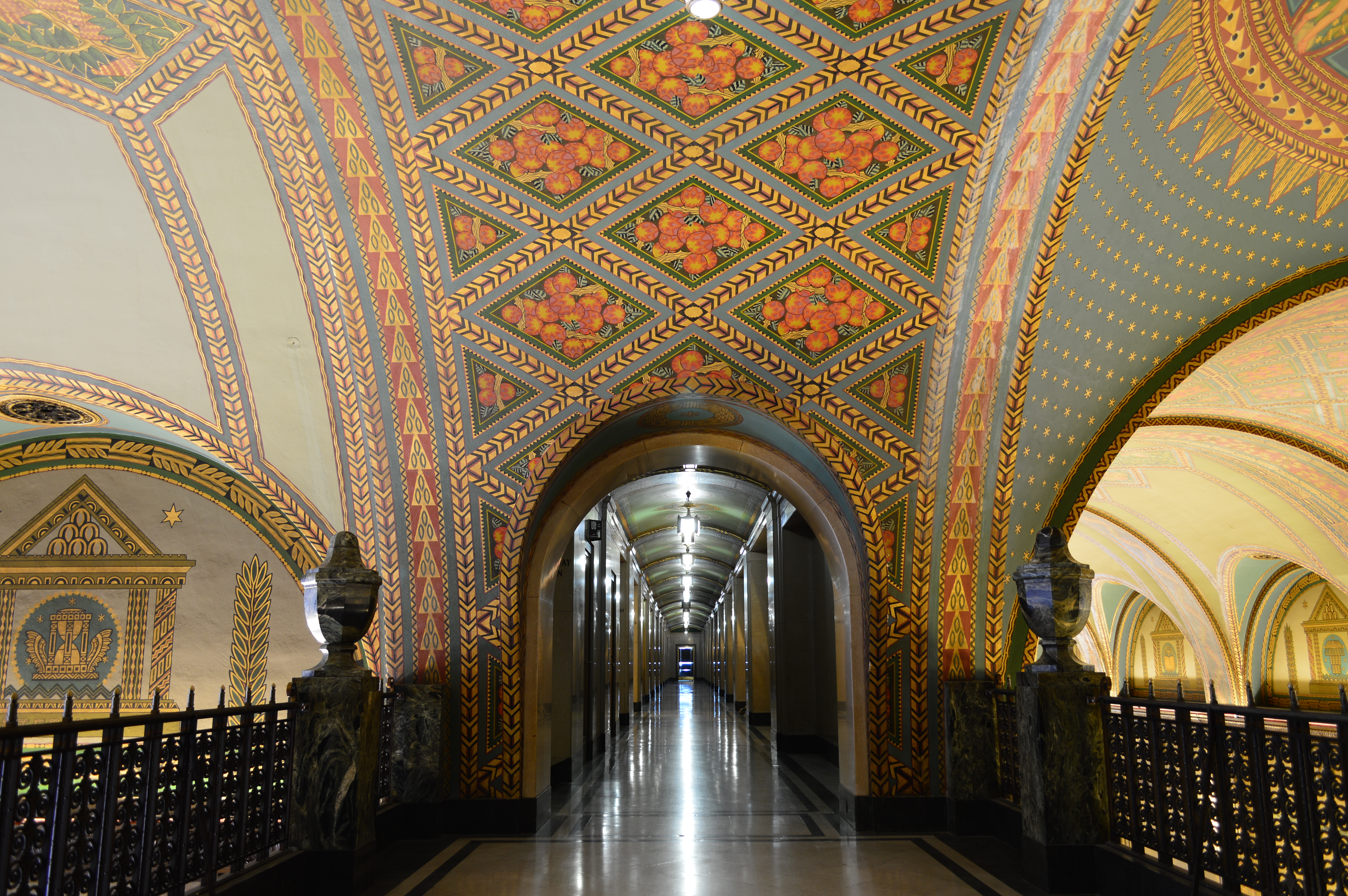
The Fisher Building in Detroit, Michigan, by Joseph Nathaniel French (1928)

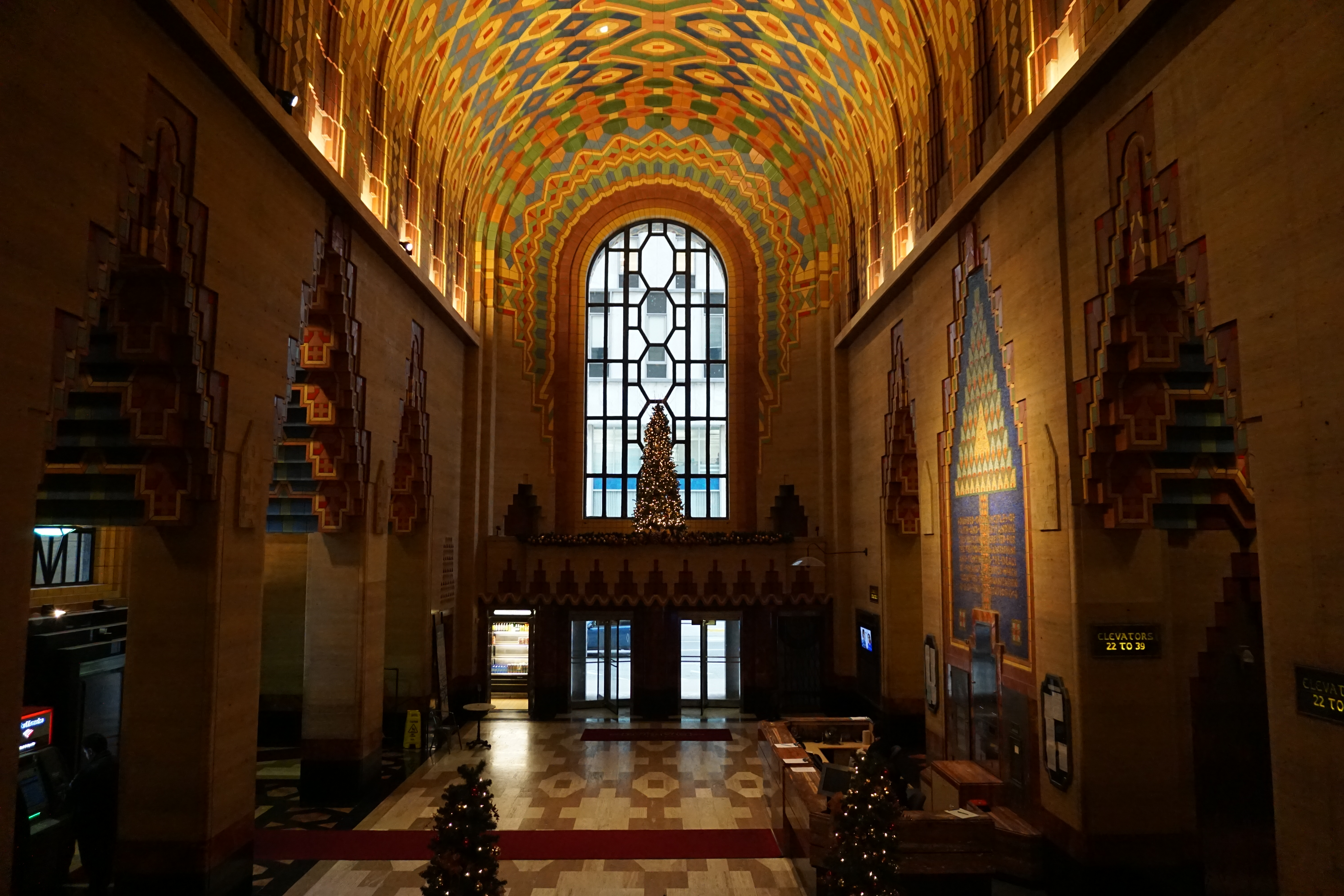
Lower lobby of the Guardian Building in Detroit by Wirt Rowland (1929)

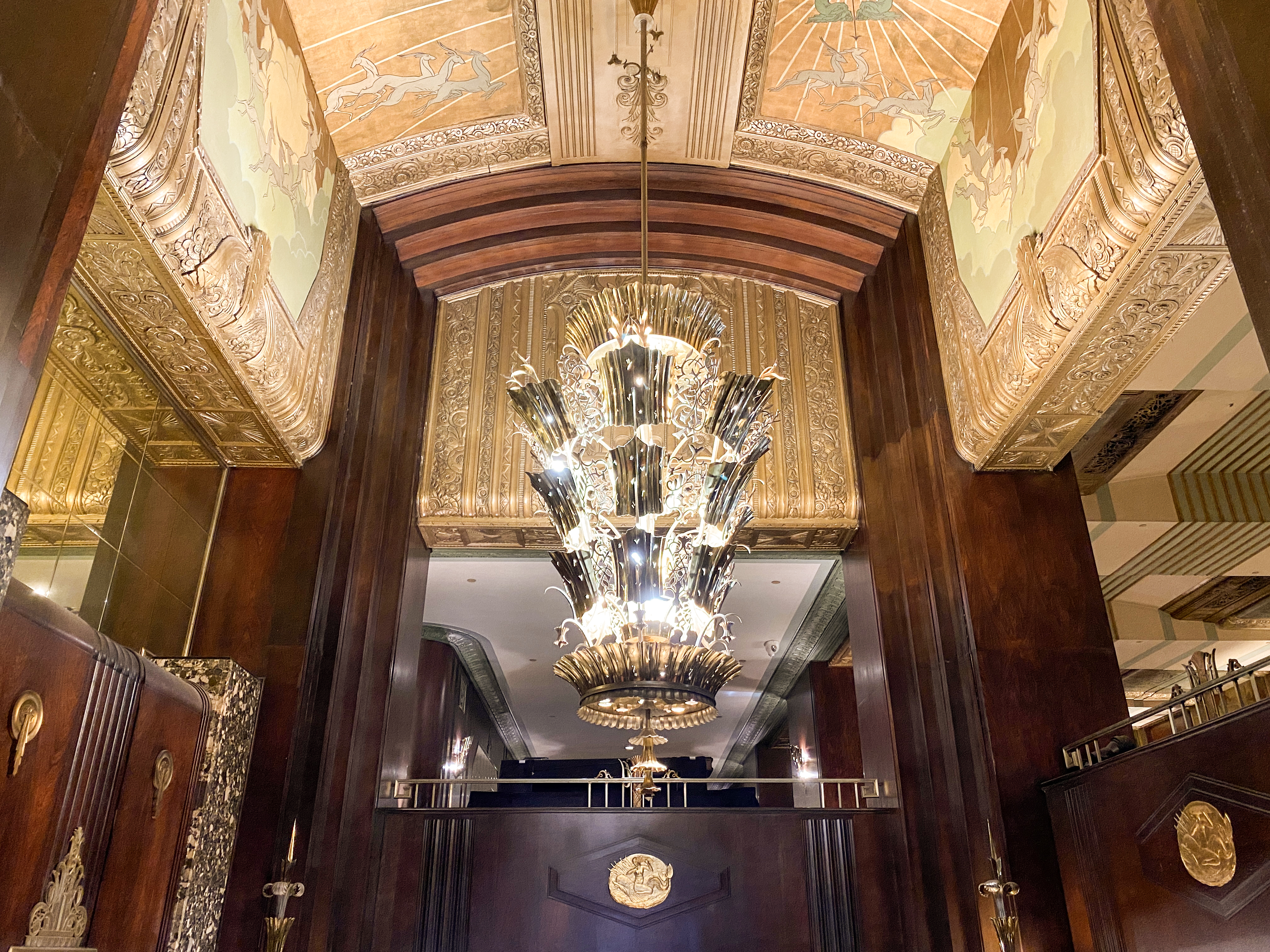
Ceiling and chandelier detail on the lobby of the Carew Tower in Cincinnati, Ohio, by Walter W. Ahlschlager (1930)

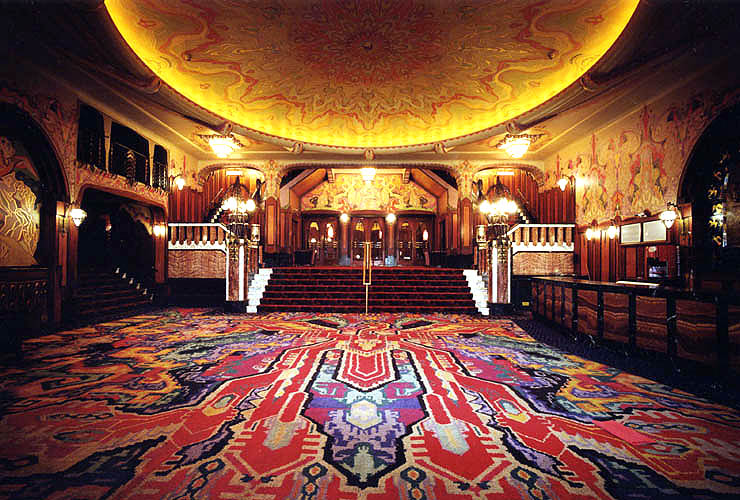
Foyer of the Tuschinski Theatre in Amsterdam by Hijman Louis de Jong (1921)

The grand showcases of American Art Deco interior design were the lobbies of government buildings, theaters, and particularly office buildings. Interiors were extremely colorful and dynamic, combining sculpture, murals, and ornate geometric design in marble, glass, ceramics, and stainless steel. An early example was the Fisher Building in Detroit, by Joseph Nathaniel French; the lobby was highly decorated with sculpture and ceramics. The Guardian Building (originally the Union Trust Building) in Detroit, by Wirt Rowland (1929), is decorated with red and black marble and brightly colored ceramics, highlighted by highly polished steel elevator doors and counters. The sculptural decoration installed in the walls illustrated the virtues of industry and saving; the building was immediately termed the "Cathedral of Commerce". The Medical and Dental Building, called 450 Sutter Street in San Francisco by Timothy Pflueger, was inspired by Mayan architecture, in a highly stylized form; it used pyramid shapes, and the interior walls were covered with highly stylized rows of hieroglyphs.

In France, the best example of an Art Deco interior during this period was the Palais de la Porte Dorée (1931) by Albert Laprade, Léon Jaussely and Léon Bazin. The building (now the National Museum of Immigration, with an aquarium in the basement) was built for the Paris Colonial Exposition of 1931, to celebrate the people and products of French colonies. The exterior façade was entirely covered with sculpture, and the lobby created an Art Deco harmony with a wood parquet floor in a geometric pattern, a mural depicting the people of French colonies, and a harmonious composition of vertical doors and horizontal balconies.

==== Movie palaces ====
Four-story high grand lobby of the Paramount Theatre in Oakland, California, by Timothy Pflueger (1932)

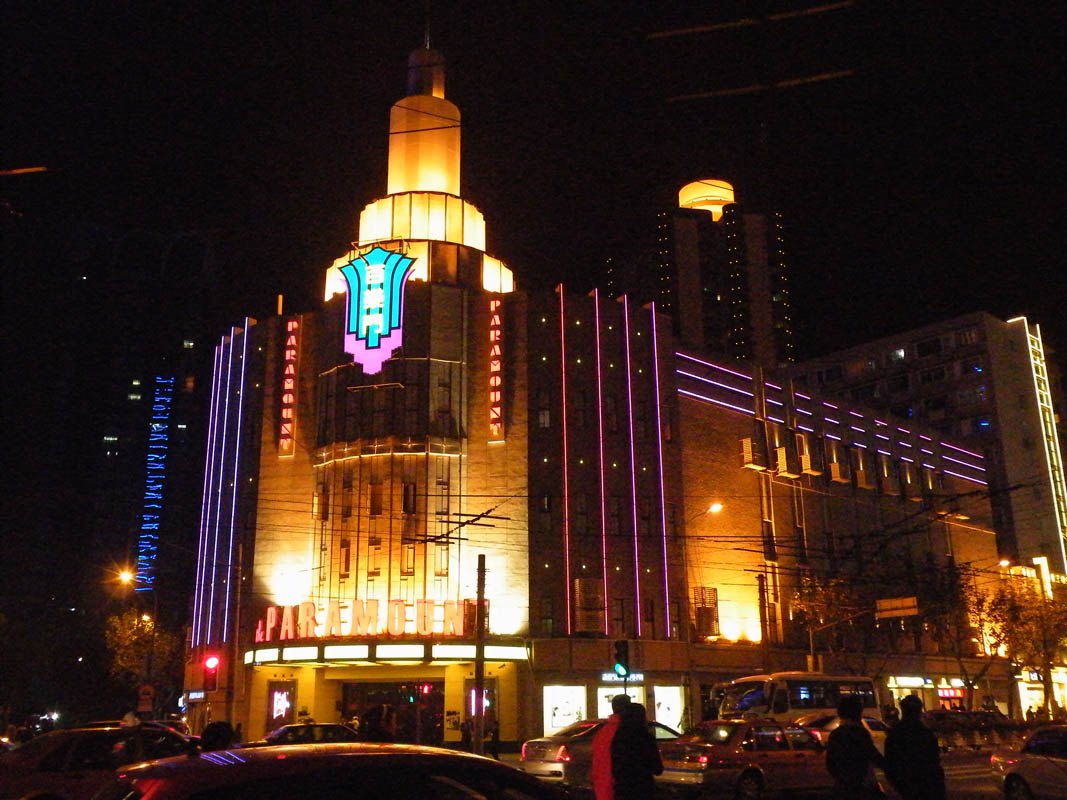
The Paramount in Shanghai, China, by S. J. Young (1933)

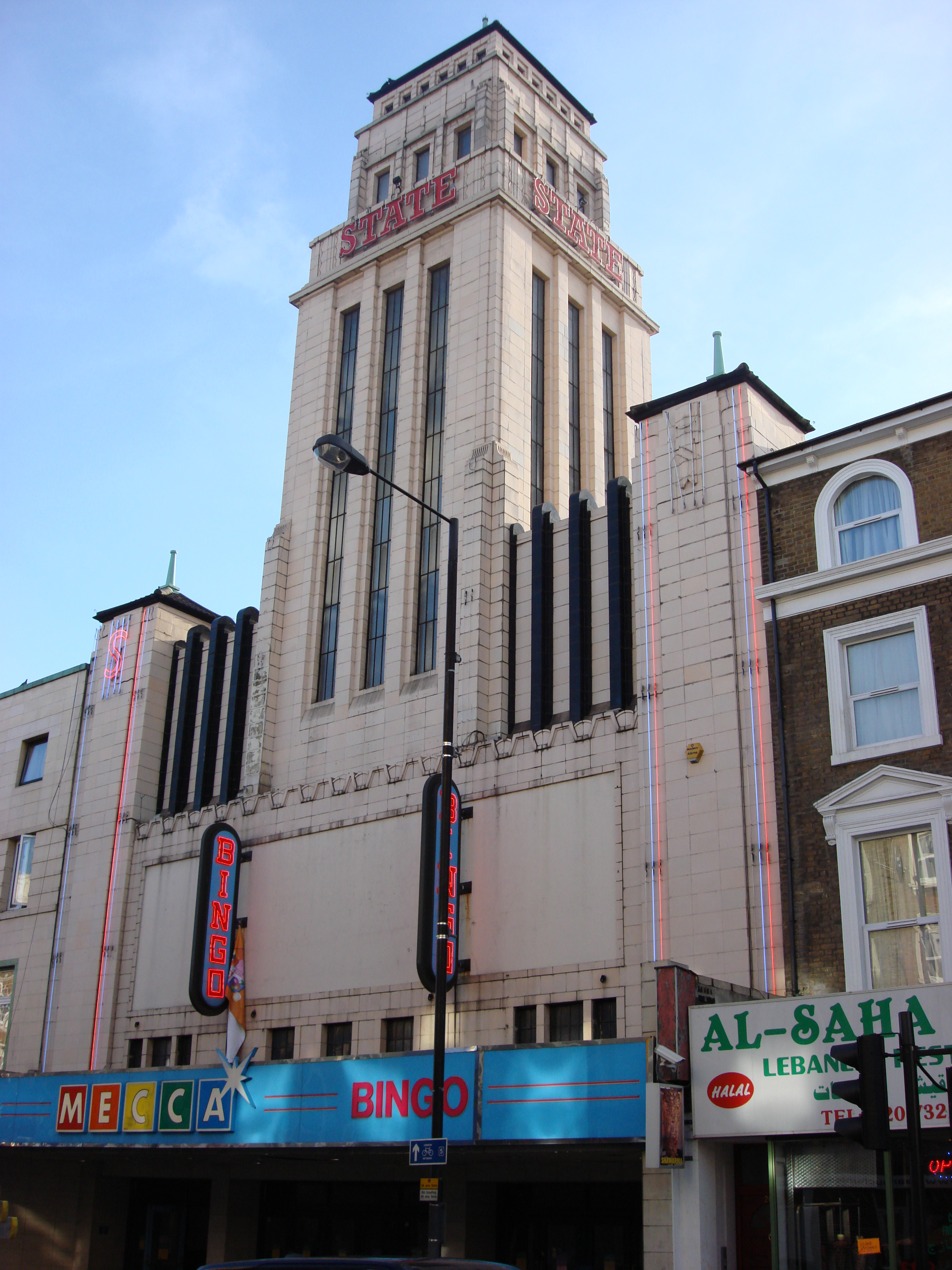
Gaumont State Cinema in London by George Coles (1937)

Many of the best surviving examples of Art Deco are cinemas built in the 1920s and 1930s. The Art Deco period coincided with the transition from silent films to sound, and movie companies built large exhibition venues in major cities to capture the huge audience that came to see movies. Movie palaces in the 1920s often combined exotic themes with Art Deco style; Grauman's Egyptian Theatre in Hollywood (1922) was inspired by ancient Egyptian tombs and pyramids, while the Fox Theater in Bakersfield, California attached a tower in California Mission style to an Art Deco Hall. The largest of all is Radio City Music Hall in New York City, which opened in 1932. Originally designed as a theatrical performance space, it quickly transformed into a cinema, which could seat 6,015 customers. The interior design by Donald Deskey used glass, aluminum, chrome, and leather to create a visual escape from reality. The Paramount Theatre in Oakland, California, by Timothy Pflueger, had a colorful ceramic façade, a four-story-high lobby, and separate Art Deco smoking rooms for gentlemen and ladies. Similar grand palaces appeared in Europe. The Grand Rex in Paris (1932), with its imposing tower, was the largest cinema in Europe after the Gaumont-Palace (1931–1973) with its 6,000 seats. The Gaumont State Cinema in London (1937) had a tower modeled on the Empire State building, covered with cream ceramic tiles and an interior in an Art Deco-Italian Renaissance style. The Paramount Theatre in Shanghai, China (1933) was originally built as a dance hall called The gate of 100 pleasures; it was converted to a cinema after the Communist Revolution in 1949, and now is a ballroom and disco. In the 1930s, Italian architects built a small movie palace, the Cinema Impero, in Asmara in what is now Eritrea. Today, many of the movie theatres have been subdivided into multiplexes, but others have been restored and are used as cultural centers in their communities.

== Neo-Art Deco ==
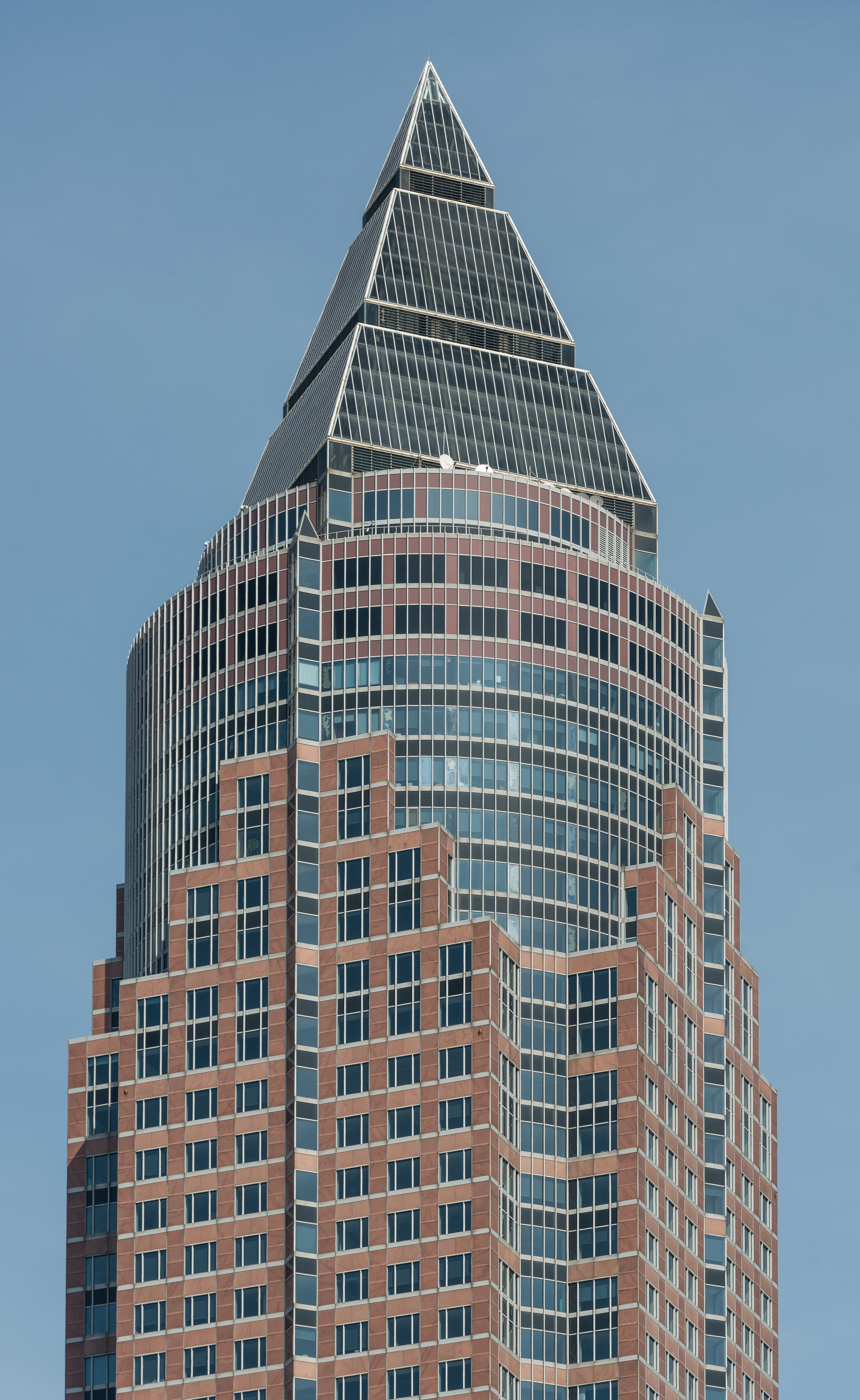
Messeturm in Frankfurt, Germany, by Helmut Jahn (1990), a Postmodern building that is reminiscent of Art Deco architecture

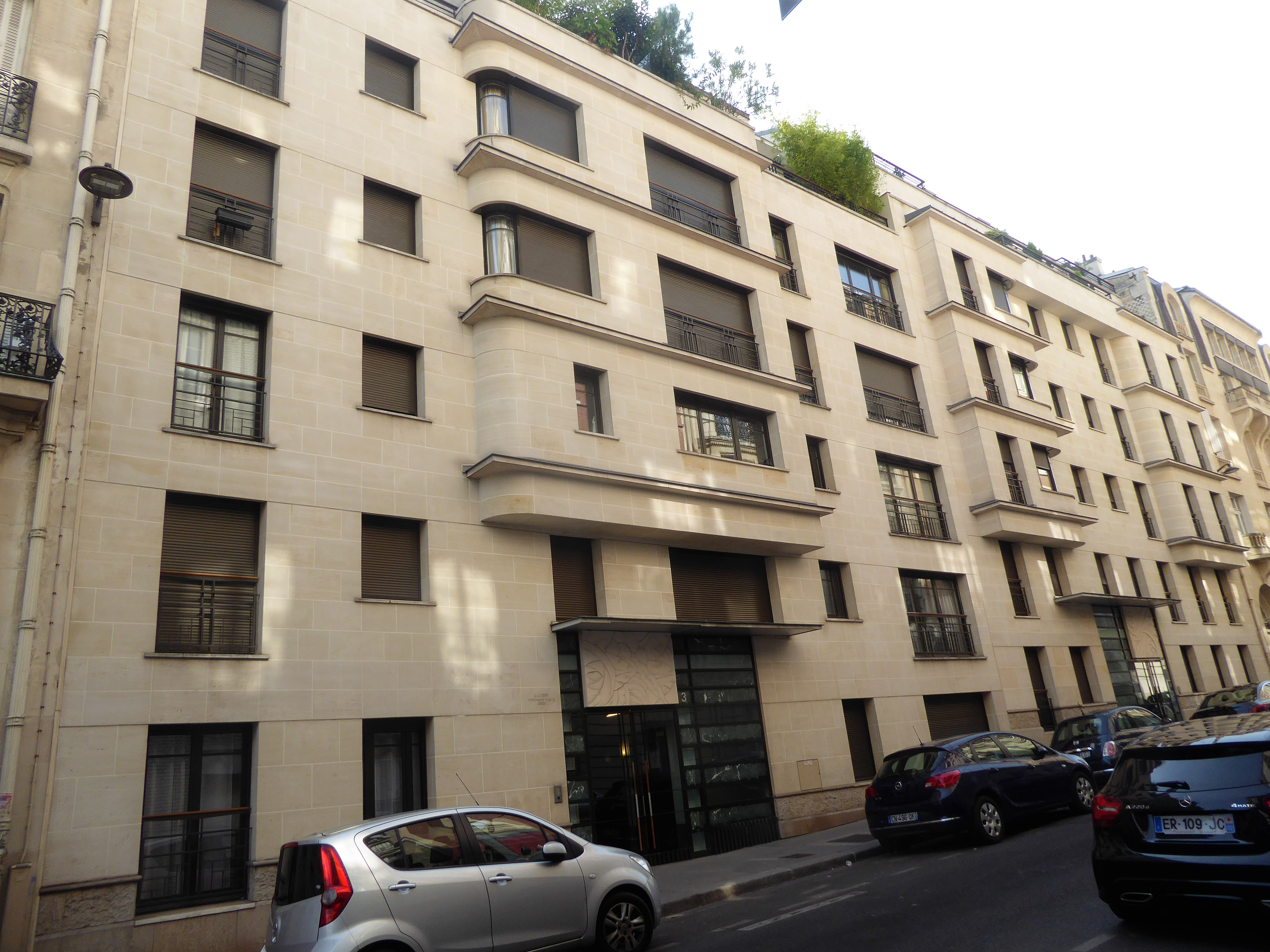
Rue Henri Heine no. 3–5 in Paris by J.J. Ory (2001), a neo-Art Deco building

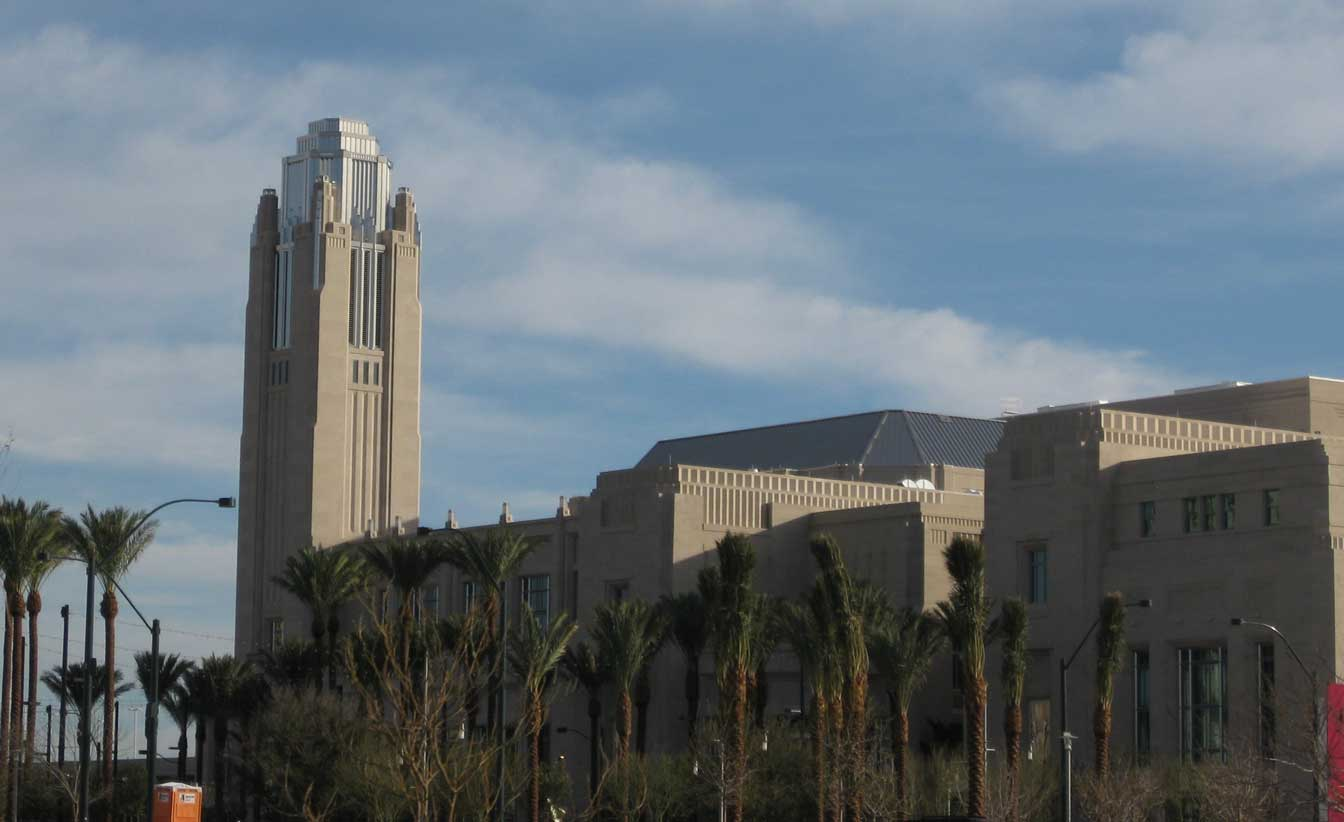
Smith Center for the Performing Arts in Las Vegas, Nevada, by David M. Schwarz (2012), a neo-Art Deco building

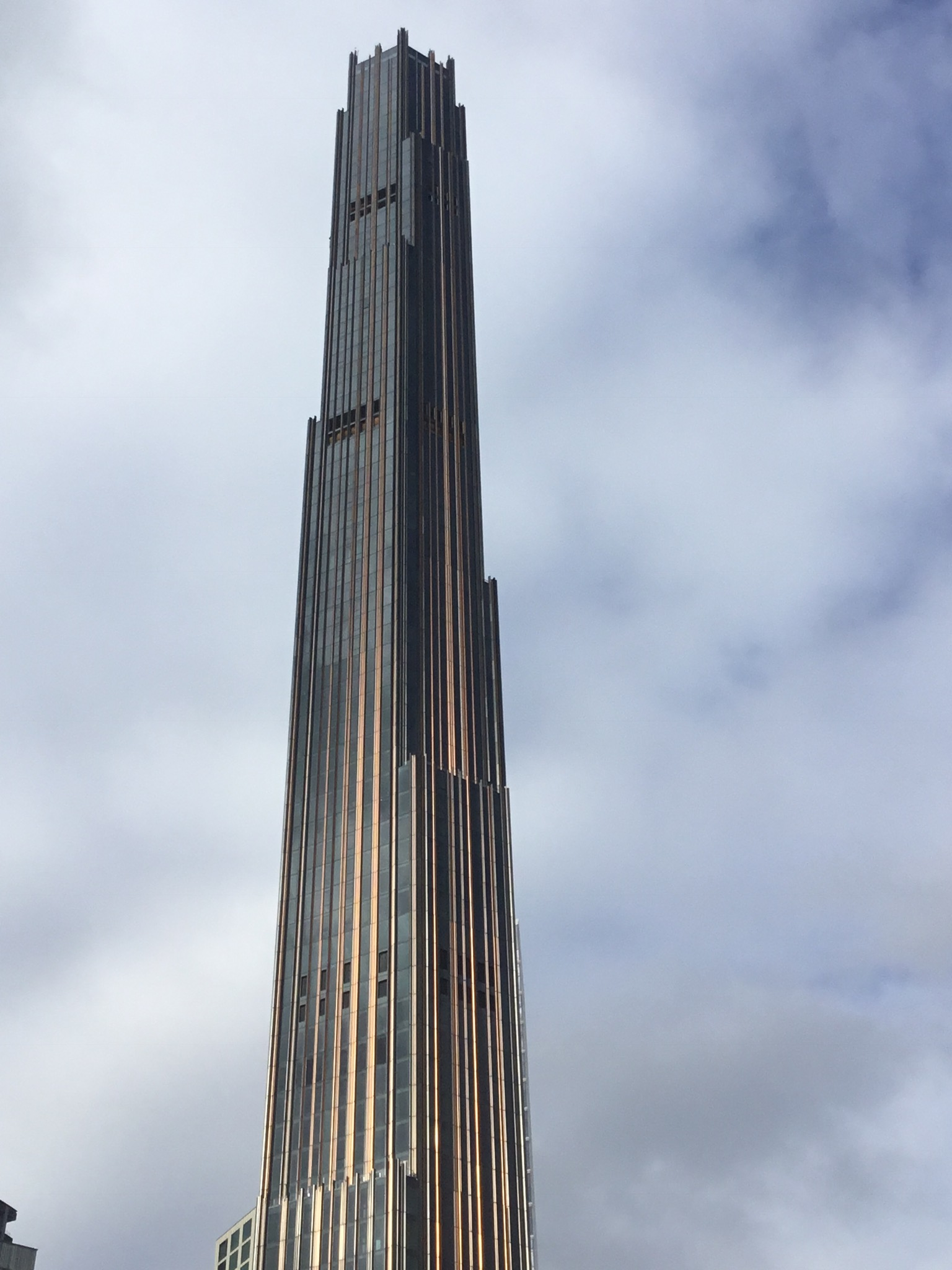
The Brooklyn Tower, in New York City (2021), a major neo-Art Deco skyscraper

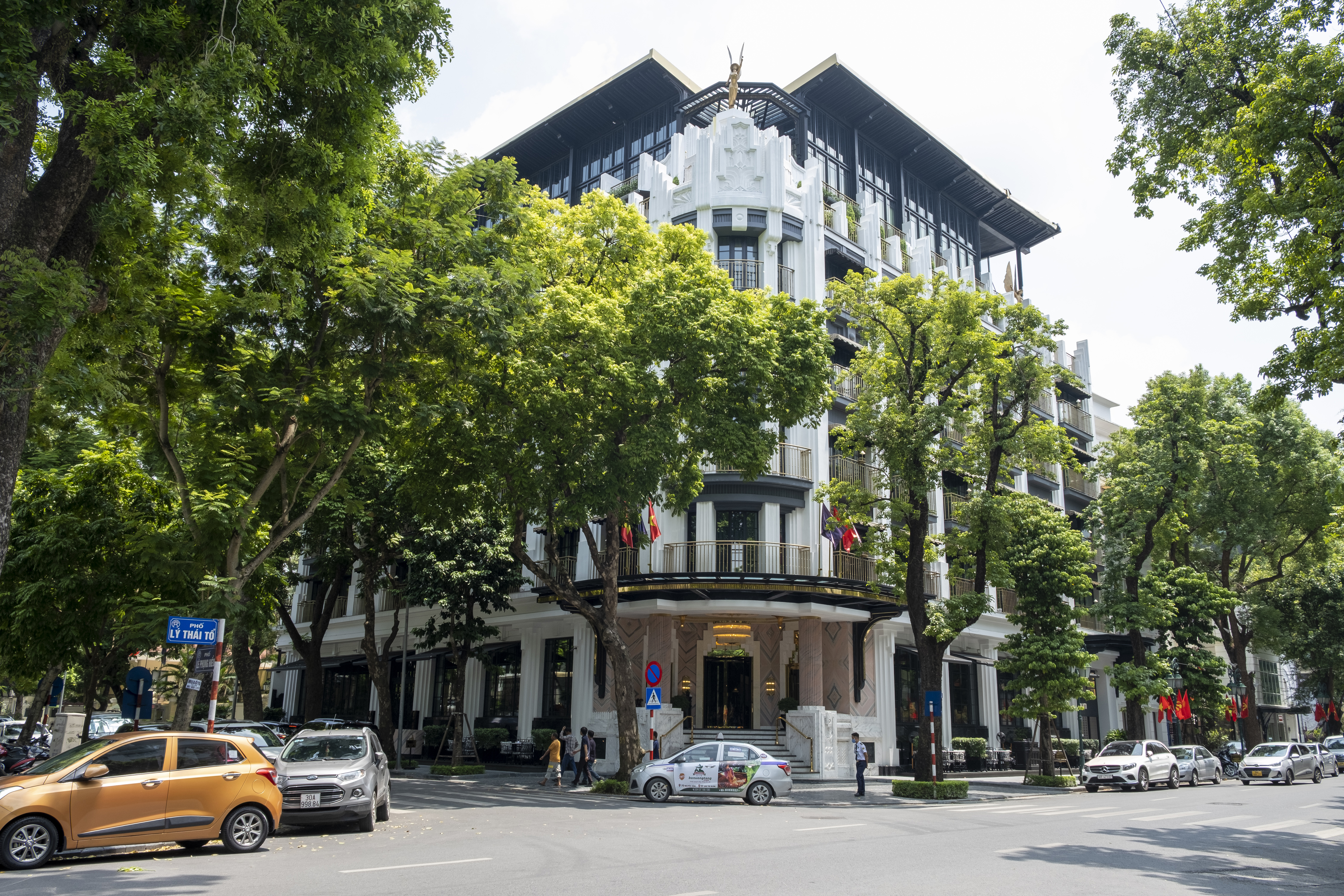
Capella Hanoi in Vietnam (2021), a neo-Art Deco building

In the 21st century, modern variants of Art Deco, called Neo Art Deco (or neo-Art Deco), have appeared in some American cities, inspired by the classic Art Deco buildings of the 1920s and 1930s. Examples include the NBC Tower in Chicago, inspired by 30 Rockefeller Plaza in New York City; the Smith Center for the Performing Arts in Las Vegas, Nevada, which includes Art Deco call backs to the Hoover Dam; 99 Hudson in Jersey City, New Jersey, the state's tallest building and the 46th tallest in the United States, which features Art Deco-inspired limestone and glass lineation; and the Brooklyn Tower in Brooklyn, New York, the borough's tallest building and the 19th tallest in the country, with its black glass and bronze piping.

== Art Deco architecture around the world ==
Art Deco architecture began in Europe, but by 1939, there were examples in large cities on every continent and in almost every country. This is a selection of prominent buildings on each continent.

=== Africa ===
Most Art Deco buildings in Africa were built during European colonial rule, and often designed by Italian, French, and Portuguese architects.

=== Asia ===
Many Art Deco buildings in Asia were designed by European architects. But in the Philippines, local architects such as Juan Nakpil, Juan Arellano, Pablo Antonio, and others were preeminent. Many Art Deco landmarks in Asia were demolished during the great economic expansion of Asia in the late 20th century, but some notable enclaves of the architecture still remain, particularly in Shanghai and Mumbai.

The Indian Institute of Architects, founded in Mumbai in 1929, played a prominent role in propagating the Art Deco movement. In November 1937, this institute organized the 'Ideal Home Exhibition' at the Town Hall in Mumbai, which lasted 12 days and attracted about 100,000 visitors. As a result, it was declared a success by the 'Journal of the Indian Institute of Architects'. The exhibits displayed the 'ideal', or better described as the most 'modern' arrangements for various parts of the house, paying close attention to avoid architectural blunders and present the most efficient and well-thought-out models. The exhibition focused on various elements of a home, ranging from furniture and interior decoration to radios and refrigerators, using new scientifically relevant materials and methods.

Guided by their desire to emulate the West, the Indian architects were fascinated by the industrial modernity that Art Deco offered. The western elites were the first to experiment with the technologically advanced facets of Art Deco, and architects began the process of transformation by the early 1930s.

Mumbai's expanding port trade in the 1930s led to the growth of an educated middle-class population. It also saw an increase in the number of people migrating to Mumbai in search of job opportunities. This led to the pressing need for new developments through Land Reclamation Schemes and the construction of new public and residential buildings.

In parallel, the changing political climate in the country and the aspirational quality of Art Deco aesthetics led to a whole-hearted acceptance of the building style in the city's development. Most of the buildings from this period can be seen spread throughout the city neighbourhoods in areas such as Churchgate, Colaba, Fort, Mohammed Ali Road, Cumbala Hill, Dadar, Matunga, Bandra and Chembur.

=== Australia and New Zealand ===
Melbourne and Sydney, Australia, have several notable Art Deco buildings, including the Manchester Unity Building and the former Russell Street Police Headquarters in Melbourne, the Castlemaine Art Museum in Castlemaine, central Victoria and the Grace Building, AWA Tower and Anzac Memorial in Sydney.

Several towns in New Zealand, including Napier and Hastings, were rebuilt in Art Deco style after the 1931 Hawke's Bay earthquake, and many of the buildings have been protected and restored. Napier has been nominated for UNESCO World Heritage Site status, the first cultural site in New Zealand to be nominated. Wellington has retained a sizeable number of Art Deco buildings.

=== North America ===
In Canada, surviving Art Deco structures are mainly found in major cities. They range from public buildings like Vancouver City Hall to commercial buildings (College Park) to public works (R. C. Harris Water Treatment Plant).

In Mexico, the most imposing Art Deco example is the interior of the Palacio de Bellas Artes (Palace of Fine Arts), completed in 1934, featuring elaborate décor and murals. Examples of Art Deco residential architecture can be found in the Condesa district, many designed by Francisco J. Serrano.

In the United States, Art Deco buildings are found from coast to coast, in all the major cities. It was most widely used for office buildings, train stations, airport terminals, and cinemas; residential buildings are rare. During the 1920s and 1930s architects in the Southwestern United States, particularly in the US state of New Mexico, combined Pueblo Revival with Territorial Style and Art Deco to create Pueblo Deco, as seen in the KiMo Theater in Albuquerque. In the 1930s, the more austere streamline style became popular. Many buildings were demolished between 1945 and the late 1960s, but then efforts began to protect the best examples. The City of Miami Beach established the Miami Beach Architectural District to preserve its fine collection of Art Deco buildings.

=== Central America and the Caribbean ===
Art Deco buildings can be found throughout Central America, including in Cuba.

=== Europe ===
The architectural style first appeared in Paris with the Théâtre des Champs-Élysées (1910–13) by Auguste Perret, and then spread rapidly across Europe, until examples could be found in nearly every large city, from London to Moscow. In Germany, two variations of Art Deco flourished in the 1920s and 30s: The Neue Sachlichkeit style and Expressionist architecture. Notable examples include Erich Mendelsohn's Mossehaus and Schaubühne in Berlin, Fritz Höger's Chilehaus in Hamburg and his Kirche am Hohenzollernplatz in Berlin, the Anzeiger Tower in Hanover and the Borsig Tower in Berlin.

One of the largest Art Deco buildings in Western Europe is the National Basilica of the Sacred Heart in Koekelberg, Brussels. In 1925, architect Albert van Huffel won the Grand Prize for Architecture with his scale model of the basilica at the Exposition Internationale des Arts Décoratifs et Industriels Modernes in Paris.

Spain and Portugal have some striking examples of Art Deco buildings, particularly movie theaters. Examples in Portugal are the Capitólio Theater (1931) and the Éden Cine-Theatre (1937) in Lisbon, the Rivoli Theater (1937) and the Coliseu (1941) in Porto, and the Rosa Damasceno Theater (1937) in Santarém. An example in Spain is the Cine Rialto in Valencia (1939).

During the 1930s, Art Deco had a noticeable effect on house design in the United Kingdom,"Art Deco Style". Museum of London. Archived from the original on February 7, 2008. as well as the design of various public buildings. Straight, white-rendered house frontages rising to flat roofs, sharply geometric door surrounds and tall windows, as well as convex-curved metal corner windows, were all characteristic of that period.

The London Underground is famous for many examples of Art Deco architecture, and there are a number of buildings in the style situated along the Golden Mile in Brentford. Also in West London is the Hoover Building, originally built for The Hoover Company and converted into a superstore in the early 1990s. In Islington, The Coronet pub on Holloway Road was converted in the 1990s from a former cinema.

Bucharest, once known as the "Little Paris" of the 19th century, engaged in a new design after World War I, redirecting its inspiration towards New York City. The 1930s brought a new fashion that echoed across cinema, theatre, dancing styles, art, and architecture. Bucharest during the 1930s was marked by an increasing amount of Art Deco architecture from the bigger boulevards like Bulevardul Magheru to the private houses and smaller districts. The Telephone Palace, an early landmark of modern Bucharest, was the city's first skyscraper. It was the tallest building between 1933 and the 1950s, at 52.5 metres (172 ft). The architects were Louis Weeks and Edmond van Saanen Algi, and the engineer was Walter Troy. The Art Deco monuments are a crucial part of the character of Bucharest since they describe and mark an important period from its history, the interbellic life (World War I–World War II). Most of the buildings from those years are prone to catastrophe, as Bucharest is located in an earthquake zone.

=== South America ===
Art Deco in South America is especially present in countries that received a great wave of immigration in the first half of the 20th century, with notable works in their richest cities, like São Paulo and Rio de Janeiro in Brazil, Buenos Aires in Argentina, and Montevideo in Uruguay. The Kavanagh Building in Buenos Aires (1934), by Sánchez, Lagos and de la Torre, was the tallest reinforced-concrete structure when it was completed and is a notable example of late Art Deco style.

== Gallery ==
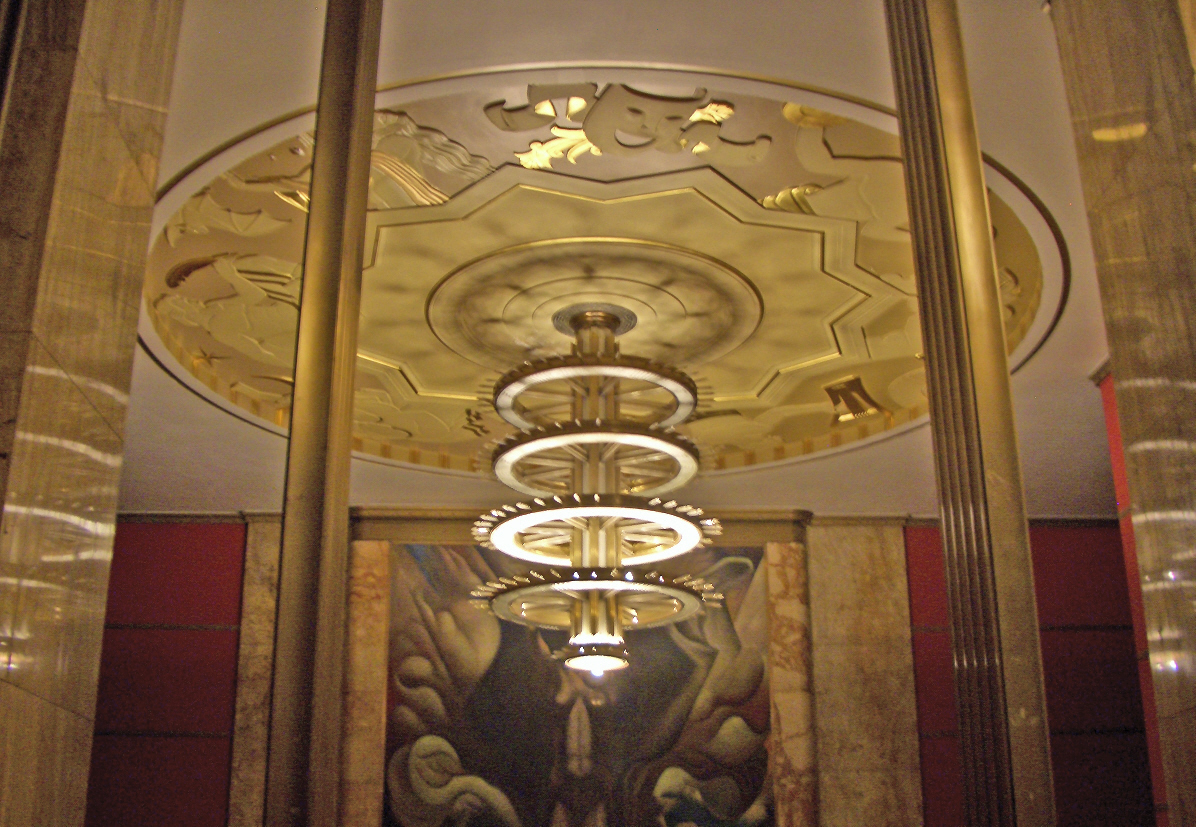
Municipal Auditorium of Kansas City, Missouri: Hoit Price & Barnes, and Gentry, Voskamp & Neville (1935)

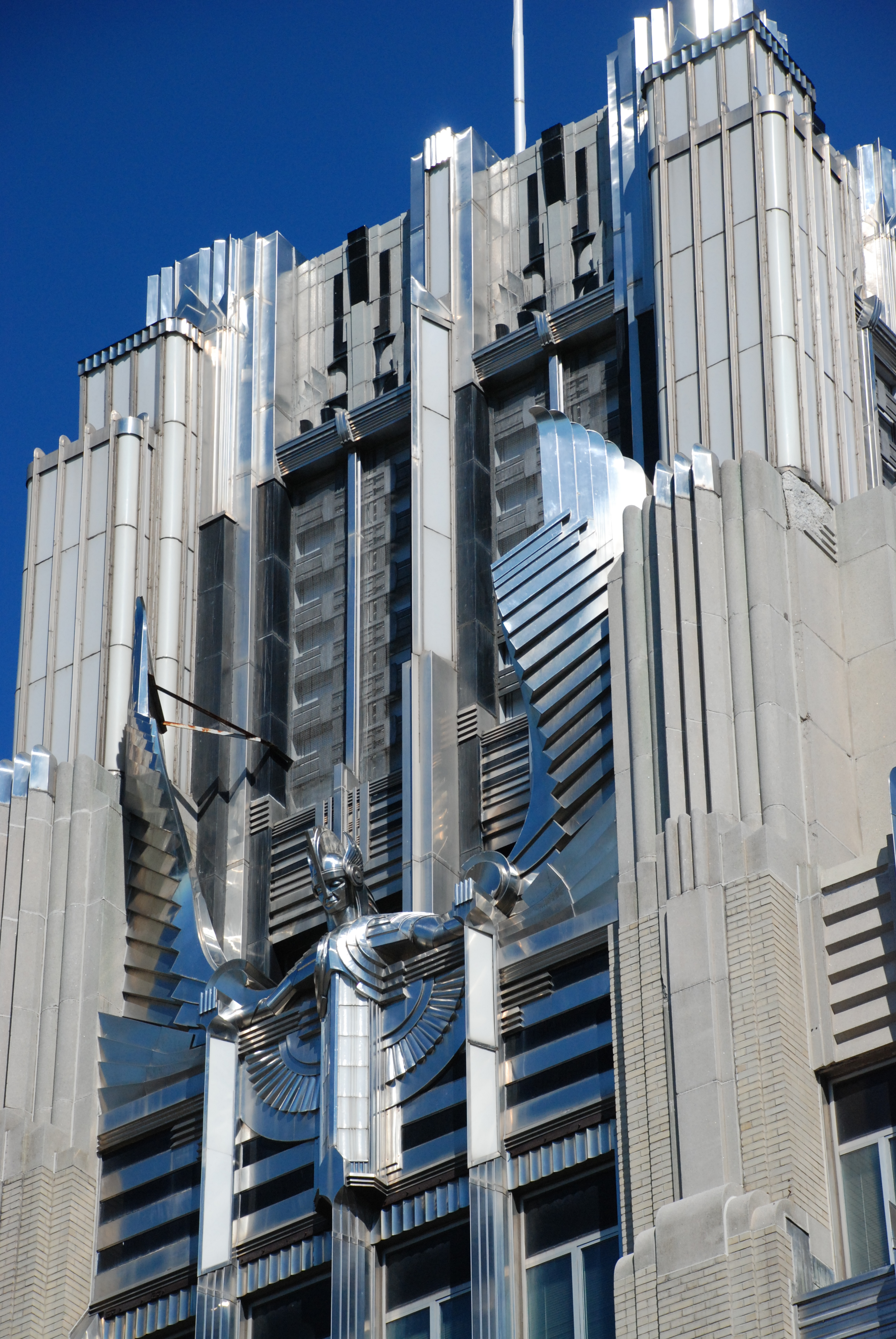
Niagara Mohawk Building, Syracuse, N.Y.. Melvin L. King and Bley & Lyman, architects, completed in 1932

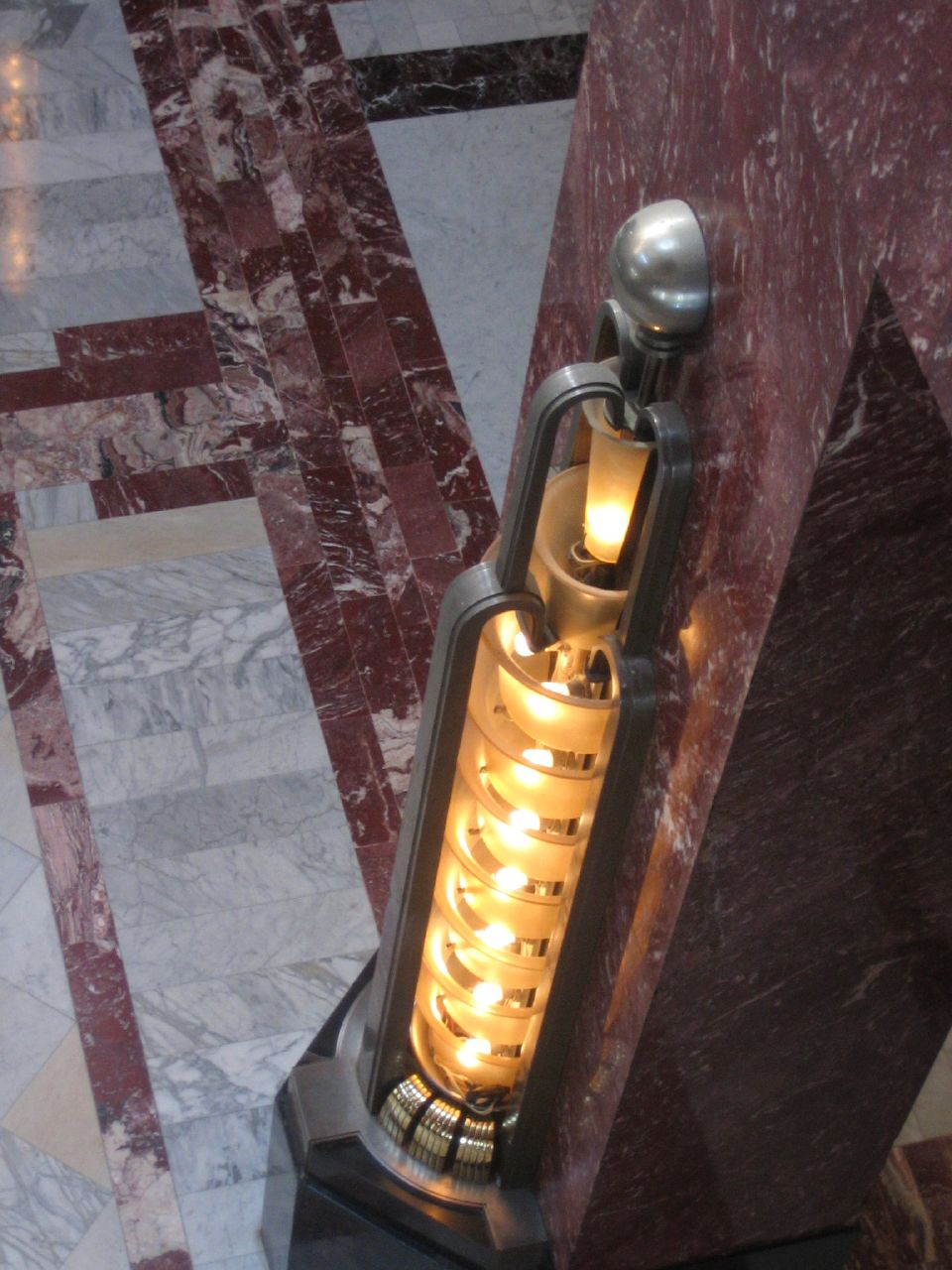
Palacio de Bellas Artes, Mexico City, Federico Mariscal, completed in 1934

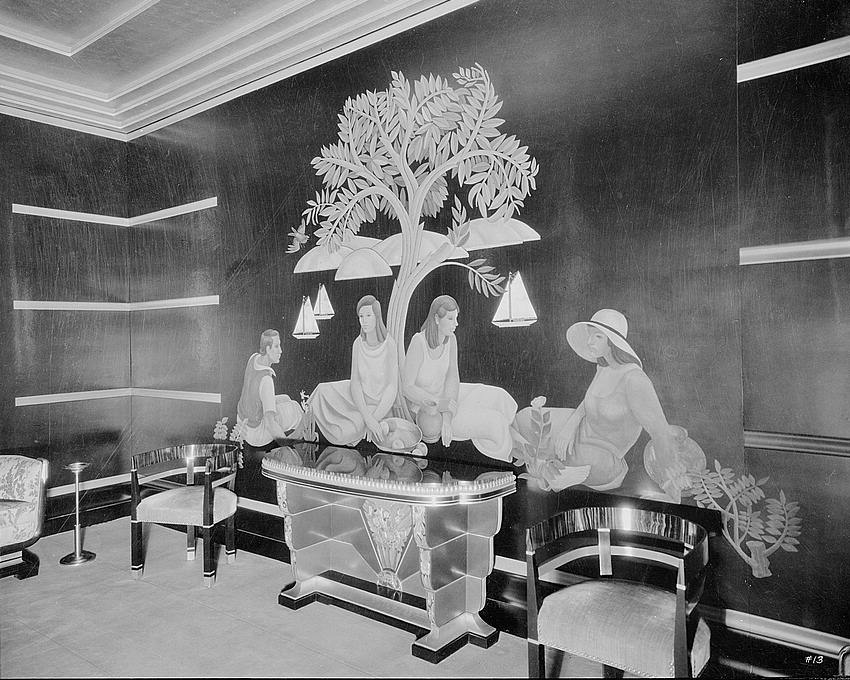
Women's Smoking Room at the Paramount Theatre, Oakland. Timothy L. Pflueger, architect (1931)

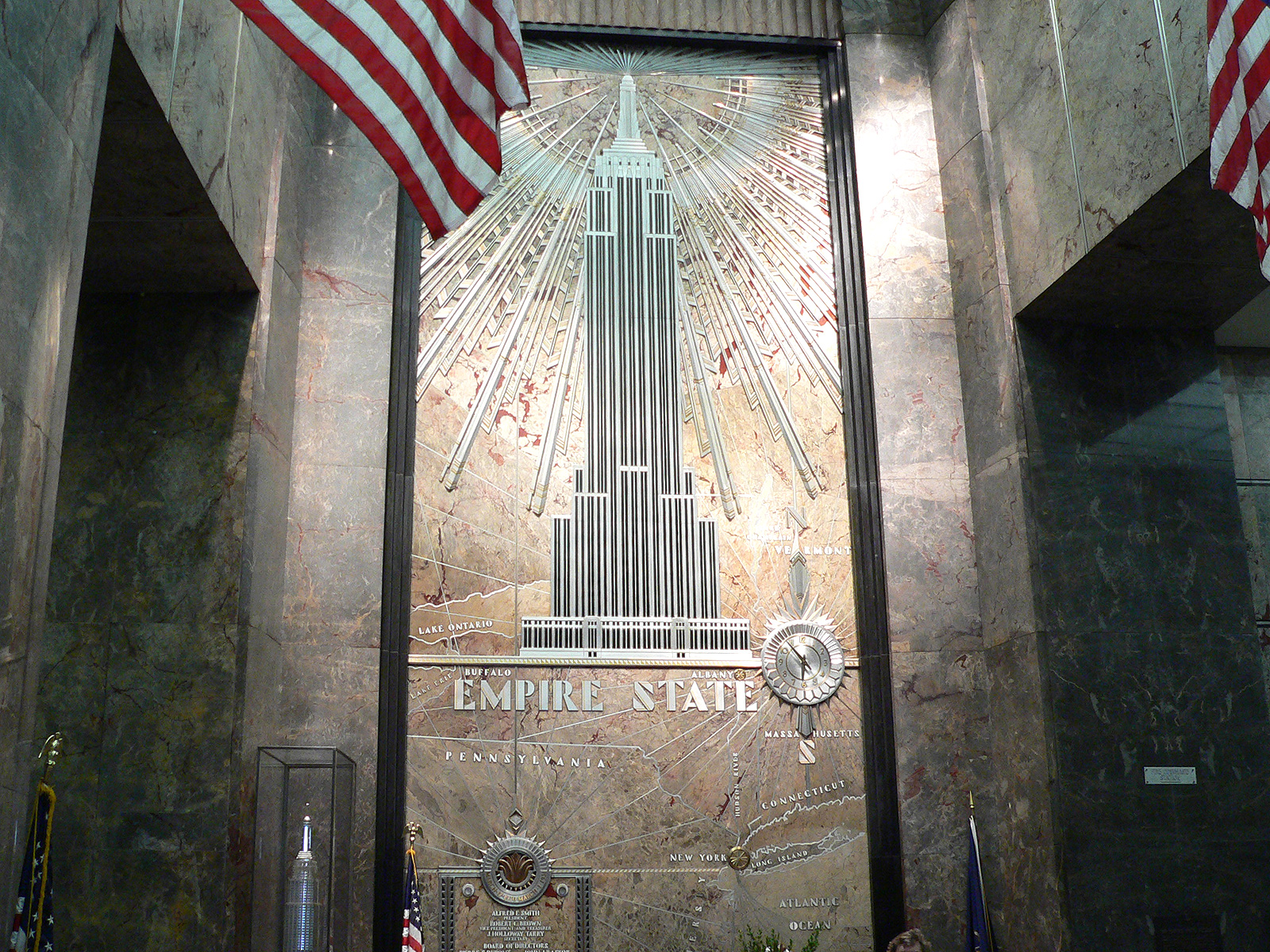
Lobby, Empire State Building, New York City. William F. Lamb, opened in 1931

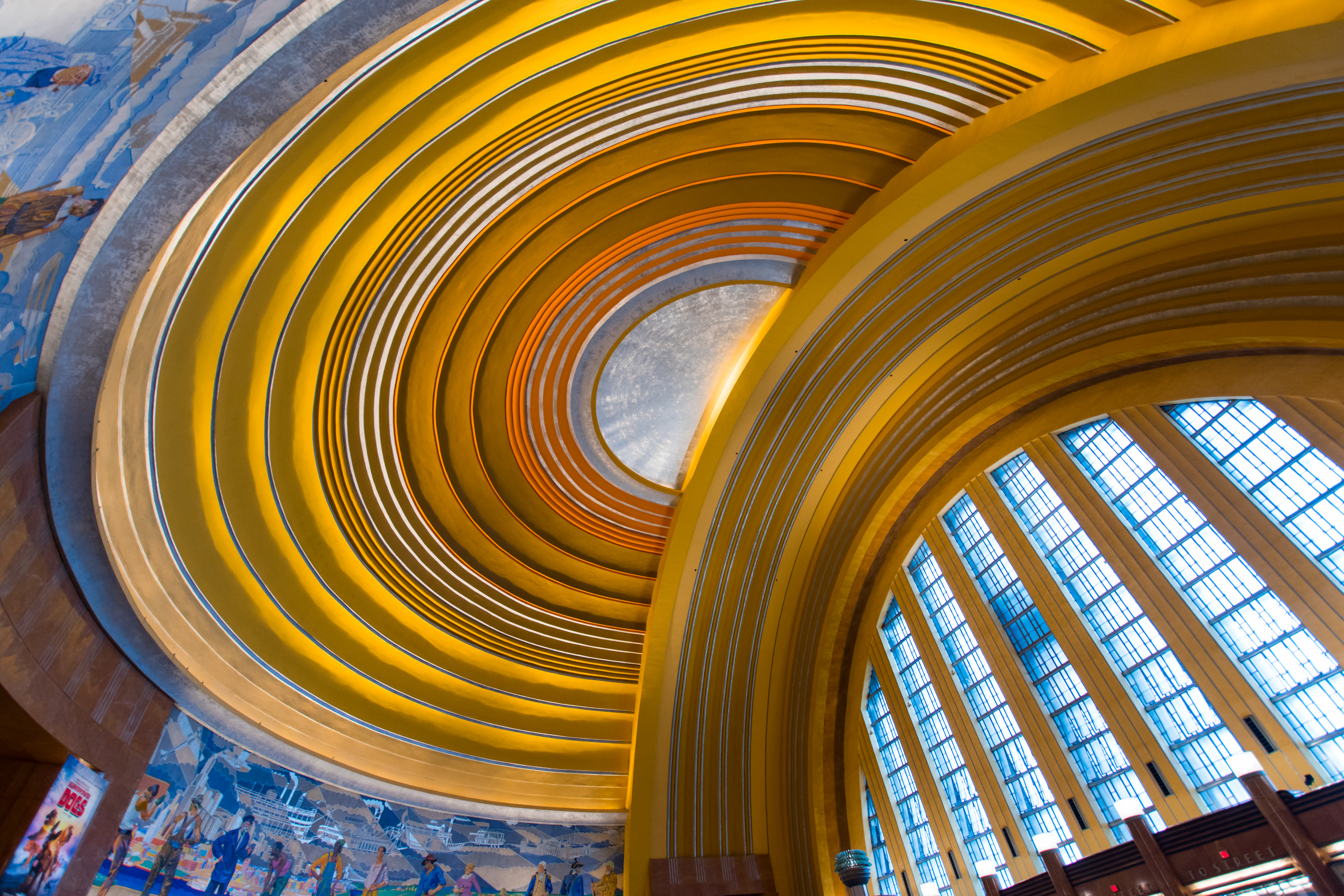
Rotunda ceiling of Union Terminal in Cincinnati, Ohio; Paul Philippe Cret, Alfred T. Fellheimer, Steward Wagner, Roland Wank(1933)

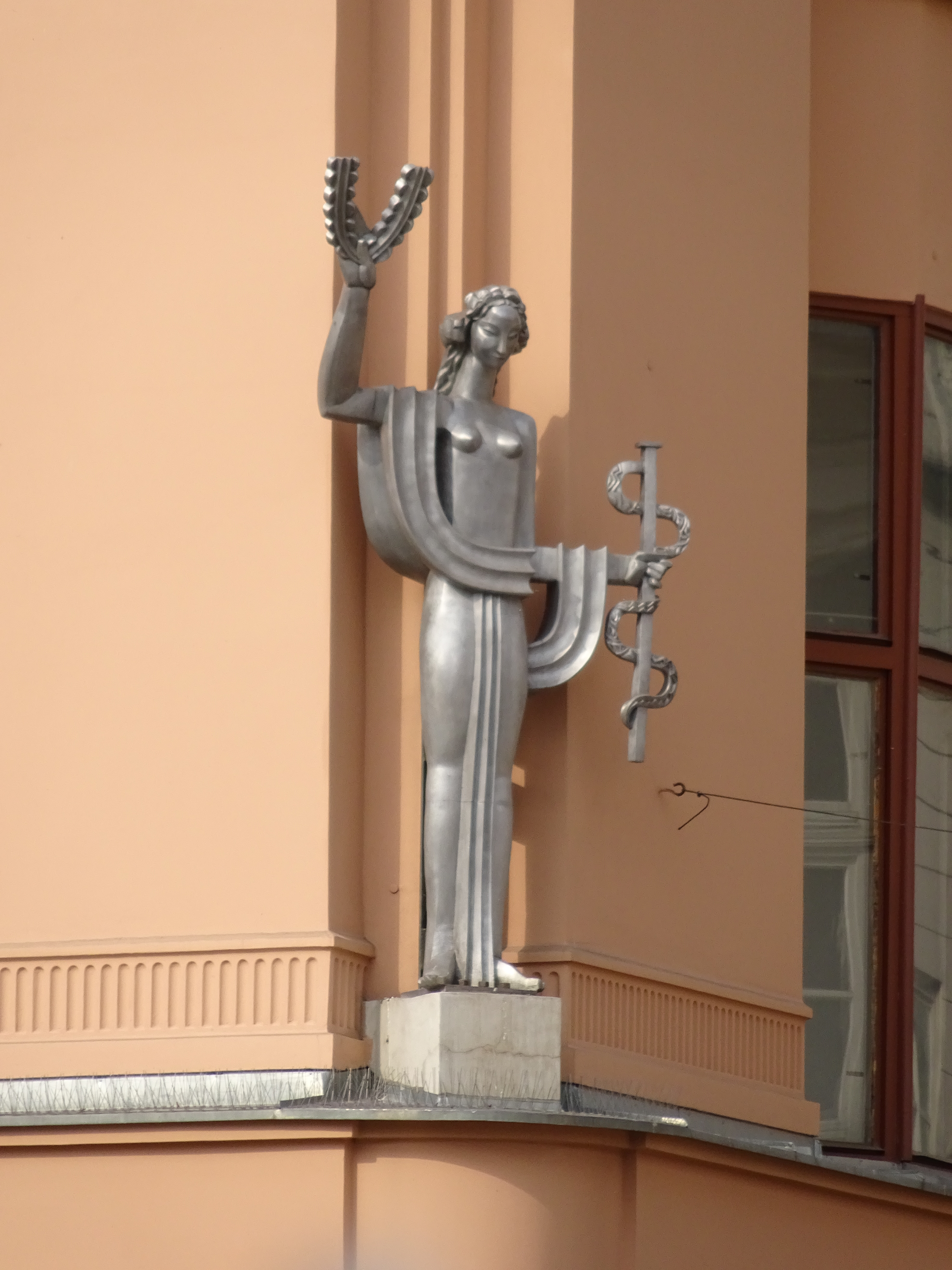
The Statue of Hygieia in Art Deco style in Kraków, Poland (1932)

== See also ==
- List of Art Deco architecture
- 1933 Chicago World's Fair Century of Progress
- 1936 Fair Park built for Texas Centennial Exposition

== Bibliography ==
- Ardman, Harvey (1985). Normandie, Her Life and Times. New York: Franklin Watts. ISBN 0531097846.
- Benton, Charlotte; Benton, Tim; Wood, Ghislaine (2003). Art Deco 1910-1939. Bulfinch Press/AOL Time Warner Book Group.
- Cabanne, Pierre (1986). Encyclopédie Art Deco (in French). Somogy. ISBN 2-85056-178-9.
- Capitman, Barbara Baer; Kinerk, Michael D.; Wilhelm, Dennis W.; Juster, Randy (1994). Rediscovering art deco U.S.A (in French). New York, N.Y: Viking Studio Books. ISBN 0-525-93442-1.
- Collins, Peter (1959). Concrete: The Vision of a New Architecture. New York: Horizon Press.
- Criticos, Mihaela (2009). Art Deco sau Modernismul Bine Temperat - Art Deco or Well-Tempered Modernism (in Romanian and English). SIMETRIA. ISBN 978-973-1872-03-2.
- Duncan, Alastair (1988). Art déco. Thames & Hudson. ISBN 2-87811-003-X.
- Fell, Charlotte; Fell, Peter (2006). Design Handbook: Concepts, Materials and Styles (1 ed.). Taschen.
- Hillier, Bevis (1983). The style of the century, 1900–1980. New York: Dutton.
- Hope, Mike (July 22, 2019). Art Deco Architecture: The Interwar Period. The Crowood Press. ISBN 978-1-78500-600-5.
- James, Kathleen (1997). Erich Mendelsohn and the Architecture of German Modernism. Cambridge University Press. ISBN 9780521571685.
- Morel, Guillaume (2012). Art Déco (in French). Éditions Place des Victoires. ISBN 978-2-8099-0701-8.
- Plum, Giles (2014). Paris architectures de la Belle Epoque (in French). Parigramme. ISBN 978-2-84096-800-9.
- Poisson, Michel (2009). 1000 Immeubles et monuments de Paris (in French). Parigramme. ISBN 978-2-84096-539-8.
- Prakash, Gyan (2010). Mumbai Fables. Princeton University Press. p. 99. ISBN 9780691142845.
- Texier, Simon (2012). Paris: Panorama de l'architecture (in French). Parigramme. ISBN 978-2-84096-667-8.
- Texier, Simon (2019). Art Déco. Editions Ouest-France. ISBN 978-27373-8172-0.
- Renault, Christophe; Lazé, Christophe (2000). Les styles de l'architecture et du mobilier. Paris: J.-P. Gisserot. ISBN 978-2-87747-465-8.
- Sharada, Dwivedi (1995). Bombay : the cities within. Mehrotra, Rahul., Mulla-Feroze, Umaima. Mumbai: India Book House. ISBN 818502880X. OCLC 33153751.
- Sharada, Dwivedi (2008). Bombay Deco. Mehrotra, Rahul., Gobhai, Noshir. Mumbai: Eminence Designs. ISBN 978-8190382151. OCLC 300923025.
