= Brick Expressionism =

Architectural style

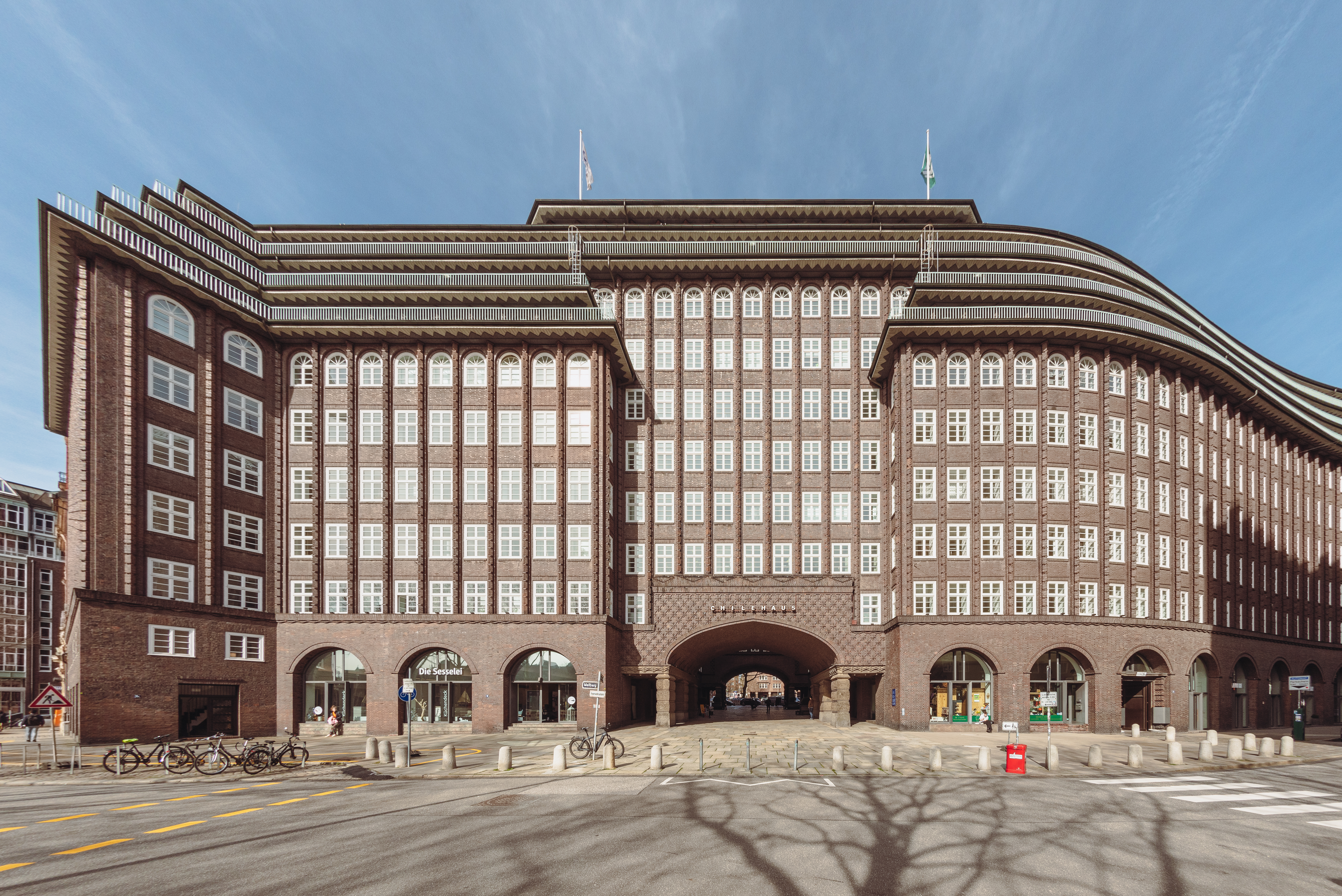
Chilehaus, Hamburg (Fritz Höger, 1921–1924)

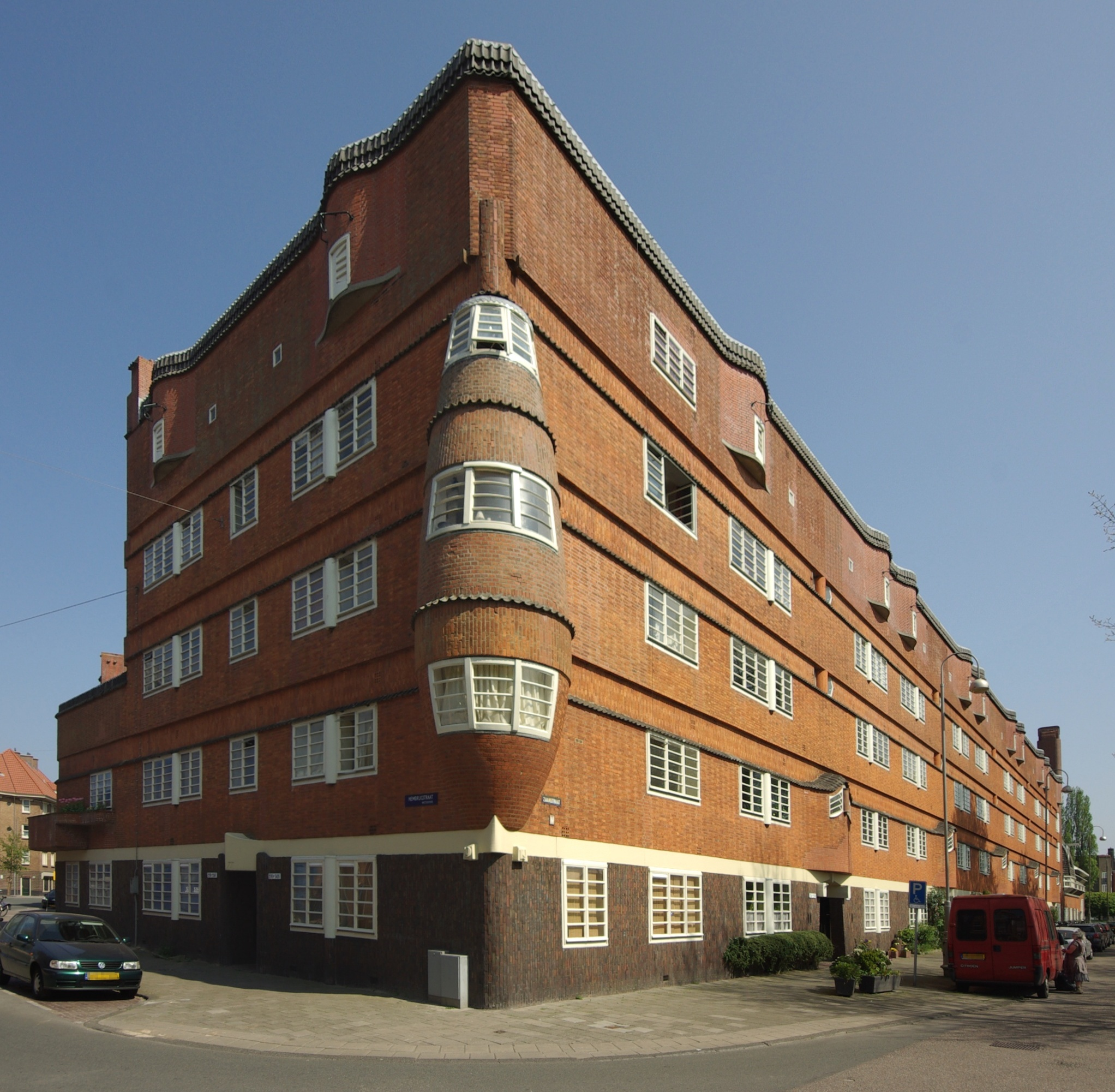
Het Schip, Amsterdam (Michel de Klerk, 1917–1920)

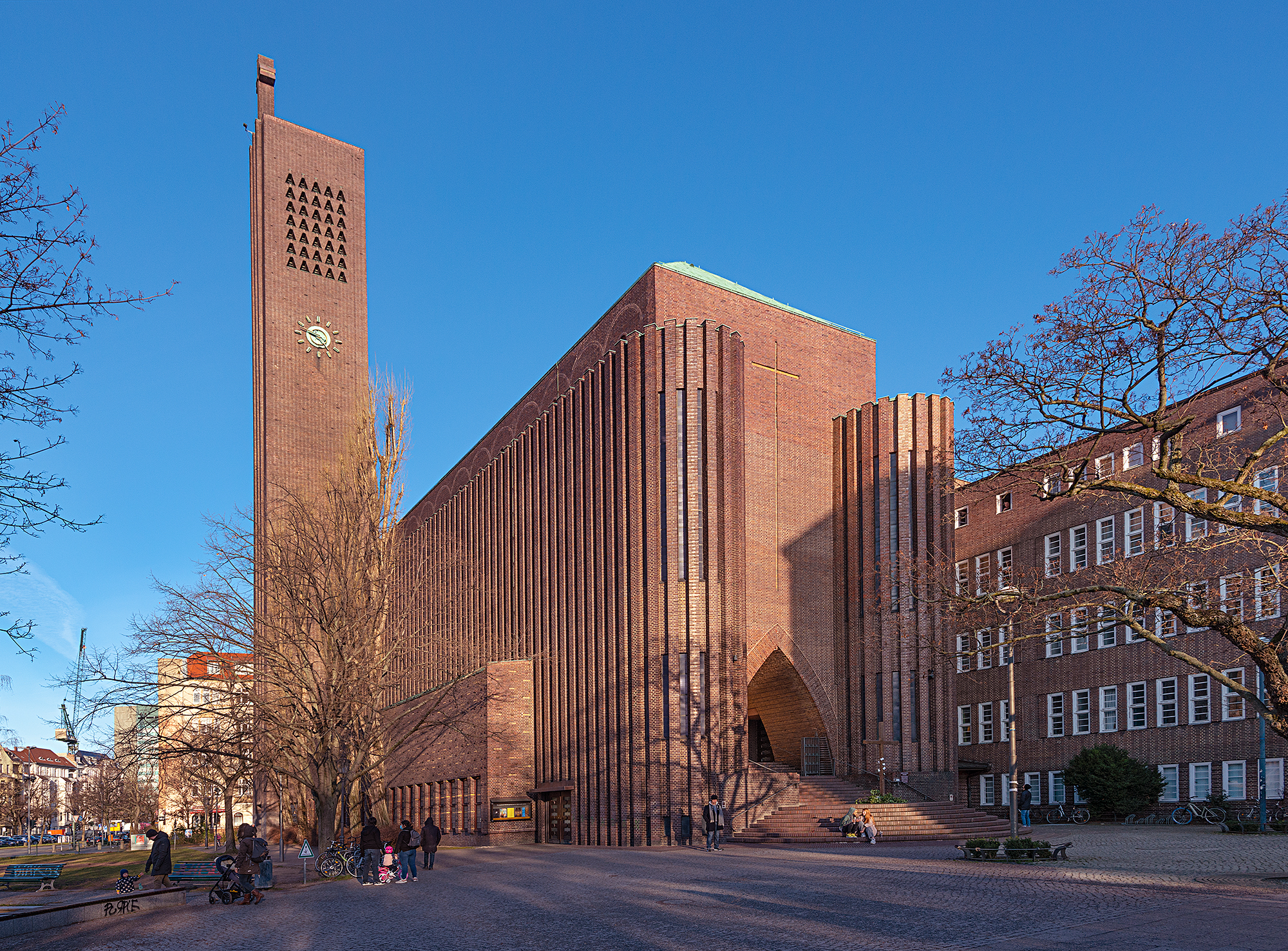
Kirche am Hohenzollernplatz, Berlin (Ossip Klarwein, 1930–1933)

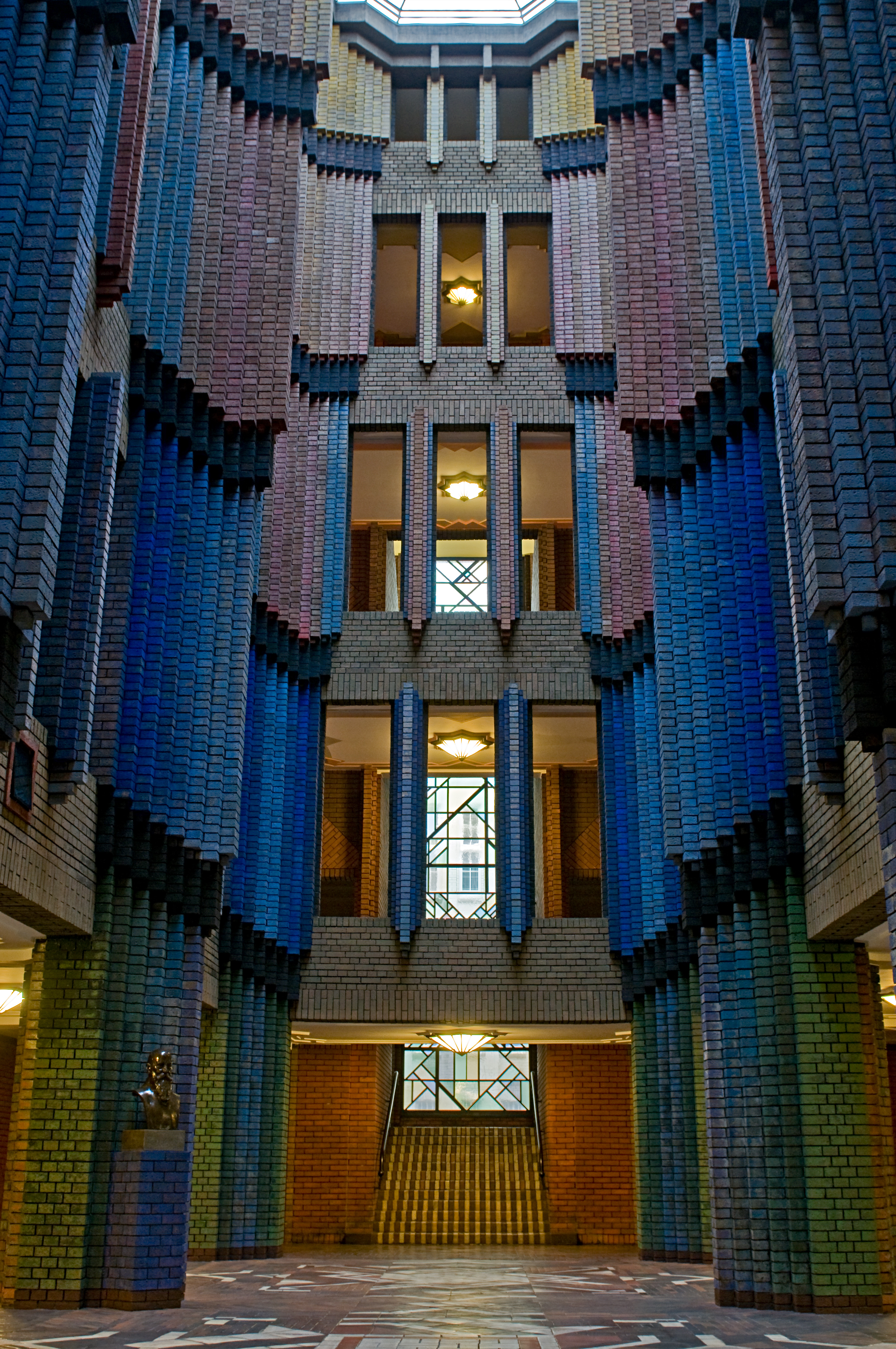
Behrensbau, Frankfurt (Peter Behrens, 1920–1924)

Examples of buildings built with Brick Expressionism style

The term Brick Expressionism (German: Backsteinexpressionismus) describes a specific variant of Expressionist architecture that uses bricks, tiles or clinker bricks as the main visible building material. Buildings in the style were erected mostly in the 1920s, primarily in Germany and the Netherlands, where the style was created.

The style's regional centres were the larger cities of Northern Germany and the Ruhr area, but the Amsterdam School belongs to the same movement, which can be found in many of the larger Dutch cities like Amsterdam, Utrecht and Groningen. The style also had some impact outside the areas mentioned.

== Style ==
Brick Expressionism developed at the same time as the "New Objectivity" of Bauhaus architecture. But whereas the Bauhaus architects argued for the removal of all decorative elements, or ornaments, expressionist architects developed a distinctive form or ornamentation, often using rough, angular or pointy elements. They were meant to express the dynamic of the period, its intensity and tension.

The most important building materials were the eponymous bricks and clinker bricks. Hard-fired clinker was very fashionable, especially for facades. That material was especially well adapted to the difficult environmental requirements of industrial buildings, particularly in the Ruhr area. Its characteristic rough surface and rich variety of colours, from brown via red to purple, also contributed to the material's popularity.

A striking feature of Brick Expressionism is the liveliness of its facades, achieved purely through the deliberate setting of bricks in patterns. This helped to enliven large, otherwise monotonous, walls. In some cases, even brick wasters (pieces that had been damaged during firing, or had been fired too long, or not long enough, leading to uneven or undesired colouring) were used as decorative elements, exploiting their individual appearance. The angular bricks were combined in various arrangements, creating a rich ornamental repertoire, including specific forms of sculpture. Horizontal brick courses that alternate between protruding and being slightly recessed are another common feature, e.g. on the Hans-Sachs-Haus in Gelsenkirchen (1927).

The facade designs were enhanced by the use of architectural sculpture, made of clinker bricks or ceramics. A well-known representative of this form of art was Richard Kuöhl. Ernst Barlach also created clinker statues, such as the frieze Gemeinschaft der Heiligen ("community of saints") on St. Catherine's in Lübeck (completed by Gerhard Marcks).

Occasionally, elements from other architectural styles were referenced, translated into the brick repertoire of forms. For example, Fritz Höger's Chilehaus in Hamburg is dominated by Art Deco aesthetics. The Anzeigerhochhaus in Hanover quotes oriental architecture. Brick Expressionism also created its very own, often quite idiosyncratic forms, such as Parabola Churches (Parabel-Kirchen), e.g. the Heilig-Kreuz-Kirche at Gelsenkirchen-Ückendorf.

Style

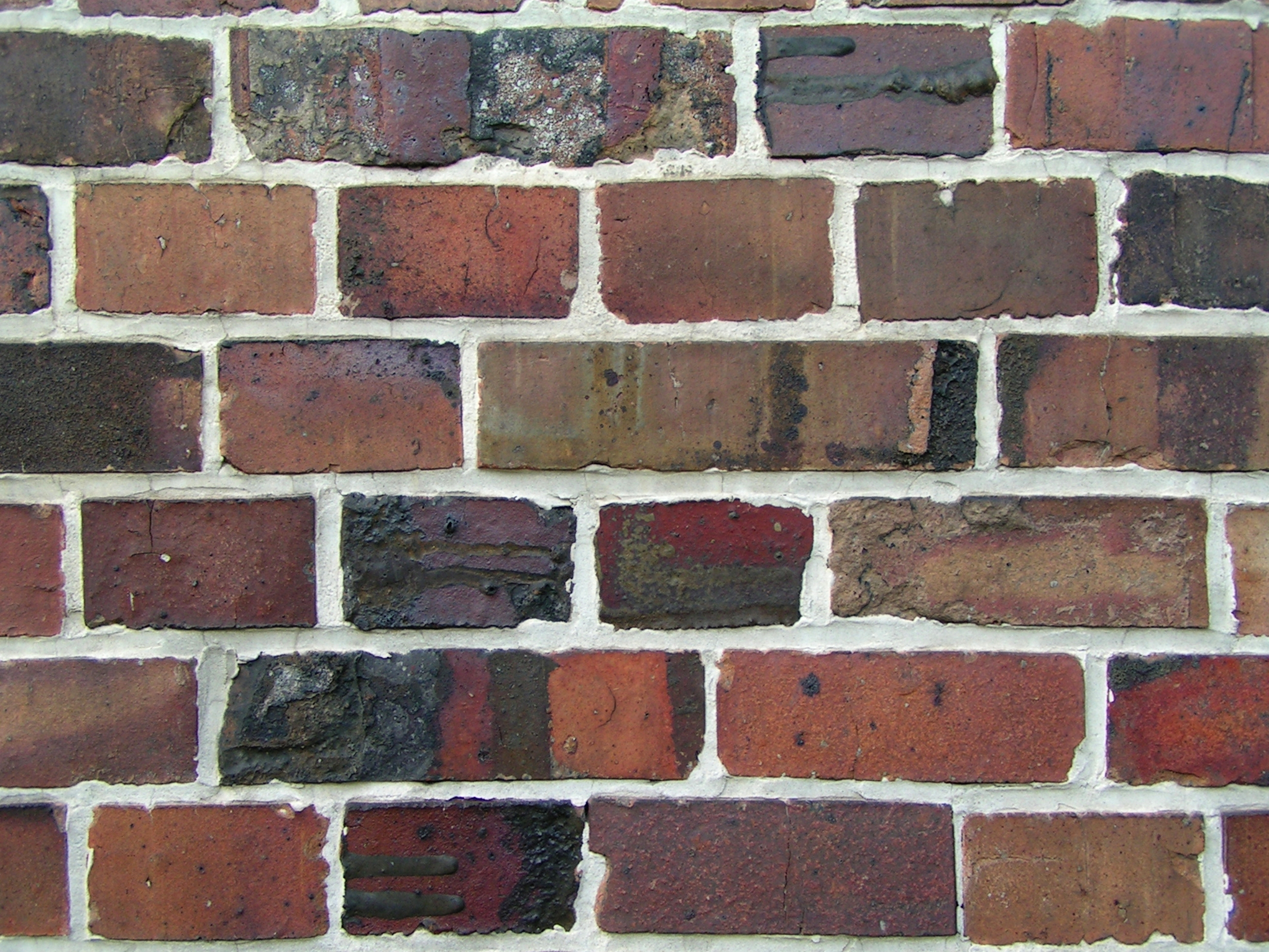
Clinker bricks

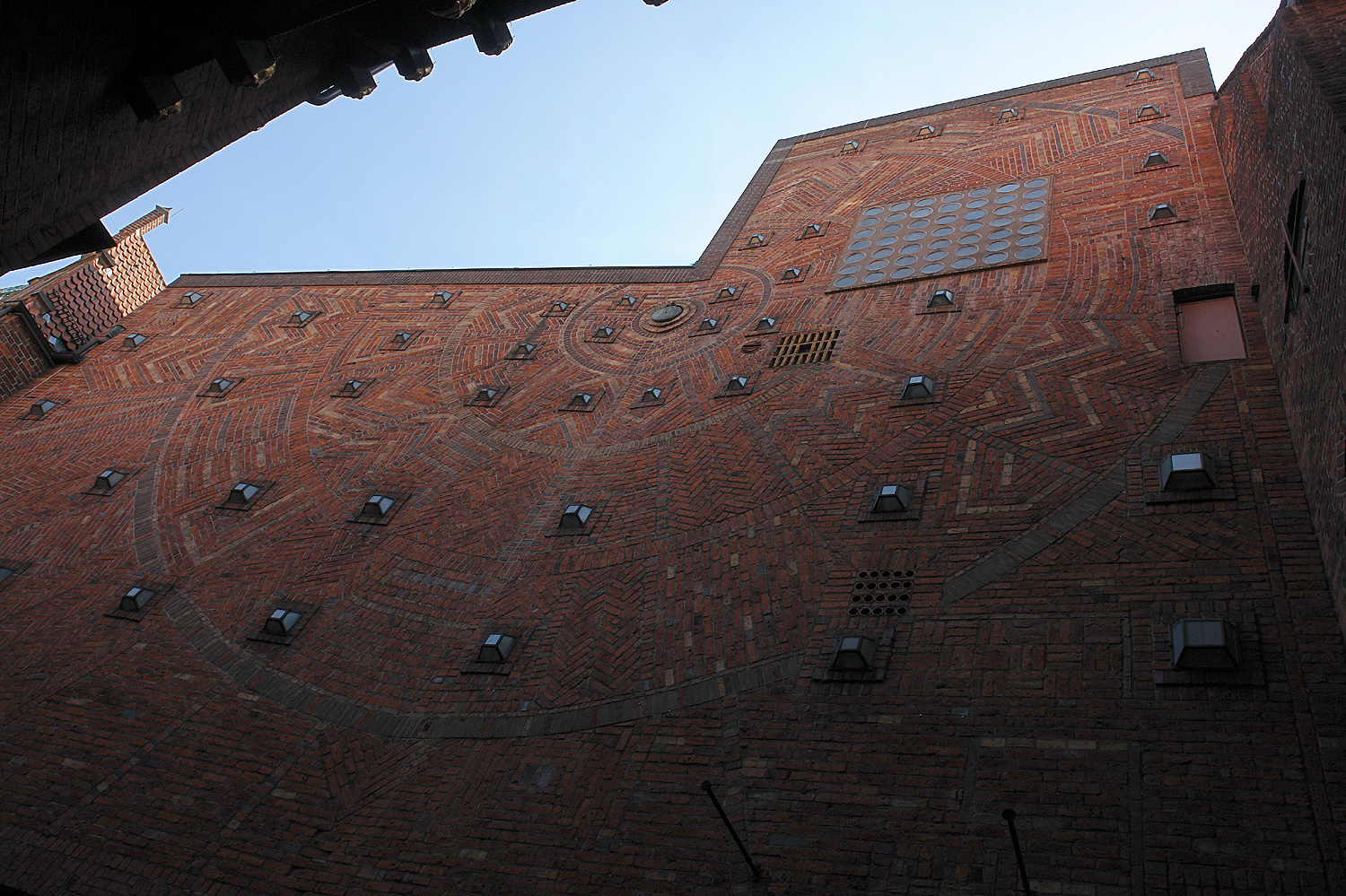
Bricks set to form a complex pattern, Böttcherstrasse, Bremen

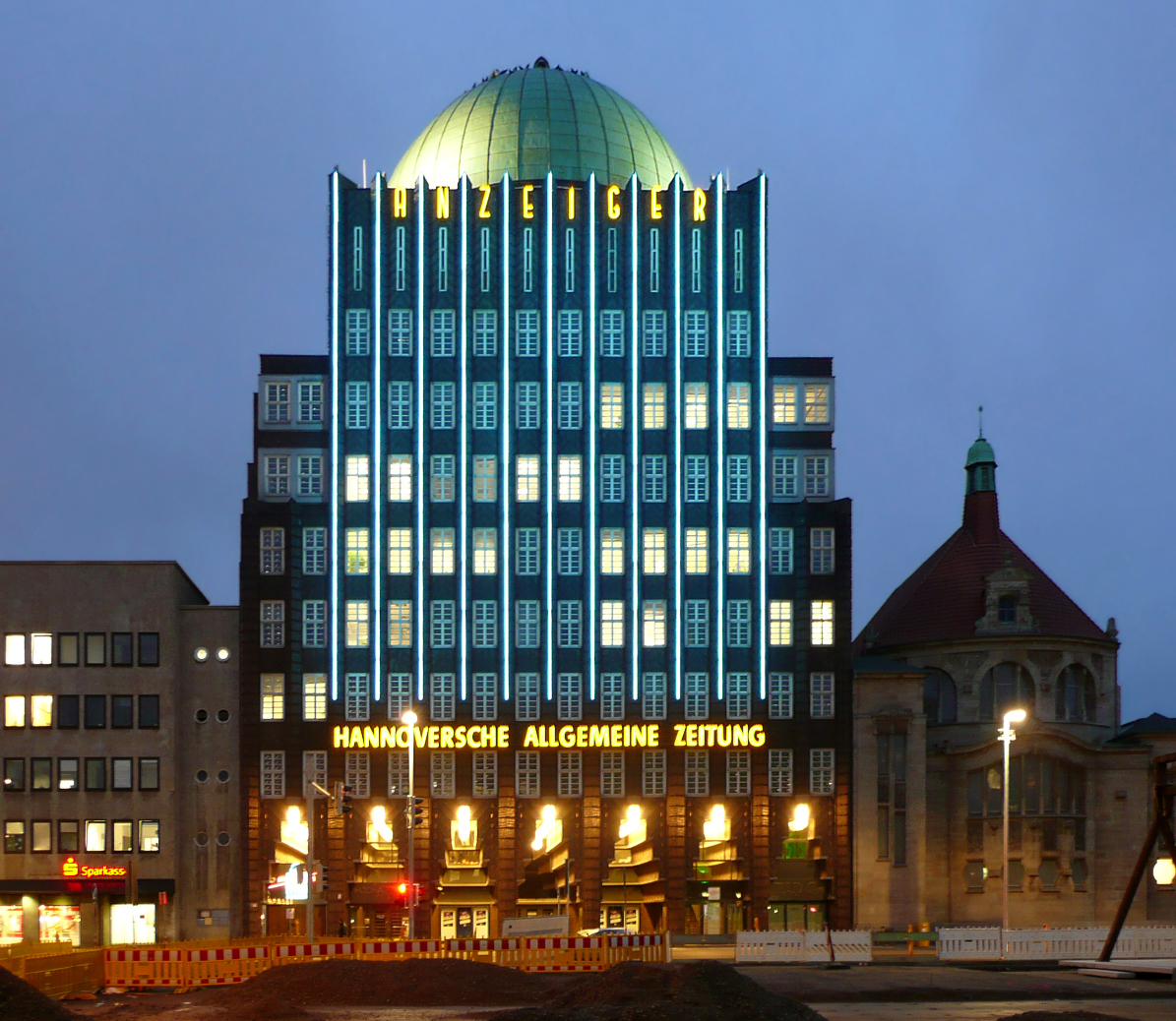
Anzeiger-Hochhaus in Hanover, 51 m, built in 1928 by Fritz Höger

== Northern Germany ==
Some outstanding examples of Brick Expressionism are found in Hamburg. Here, Fritz Höger created the highly innovative Chilehaus, with its pronounced vertically oriented design and near-playful use of material. Other examples are the neighbouring Sprinkenhof (by Hans und Oskar Gerson (in German) and Höger), the Broschekhaus and the Zigarettenfabrik Reemtsma (Reemtsma cigarette factory).

Another important Northern German representative of the style was Fritz Schumacher. He created numerous public buildings in Hamburg, such as the financial offices on the Gänsemarkt, the crematorium at Ohlsdorf Cemetery, the Walddörfer-Gymnasium secondary school in Volksdorf and the Jarrestadt school.

Böttcherstrasse at Bremen is a further important example of the style in Northern Germany.

Examples in Northern Germany

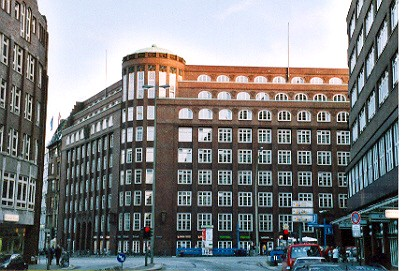
Offices at Gänsemarkt, Hamburg

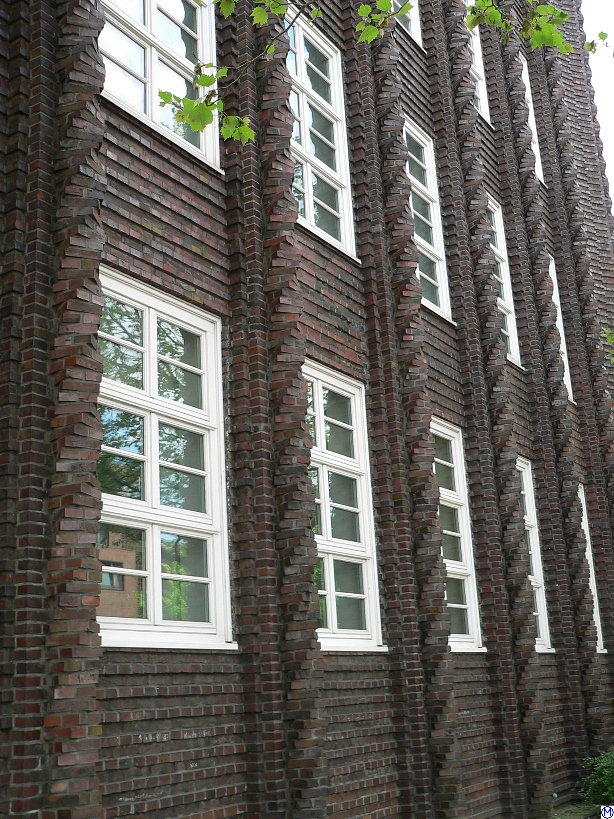
Reemtsma Cigarette Factory, Hamburg, by Fritz Höger

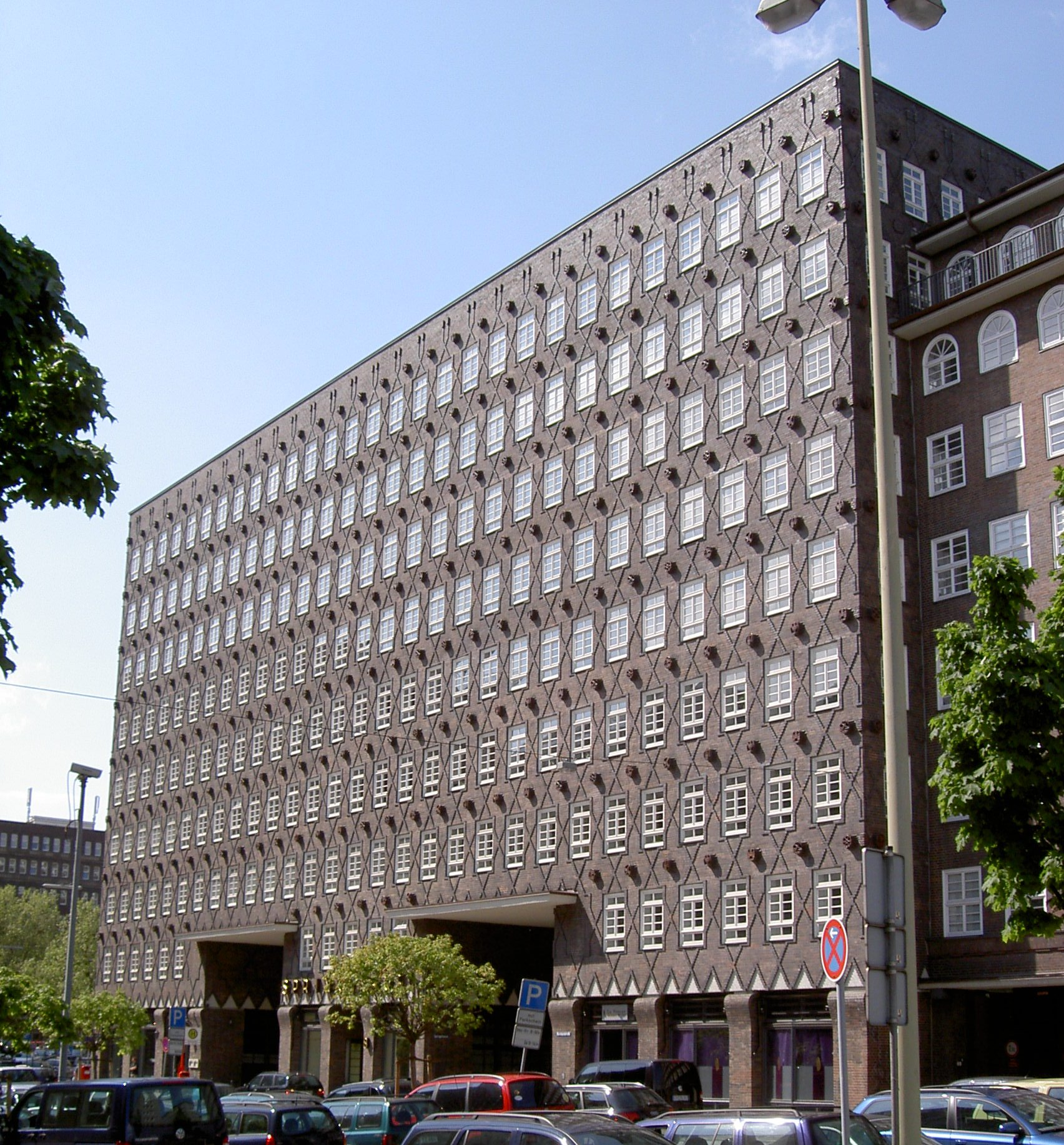
Sprinkenhof, Hamburg

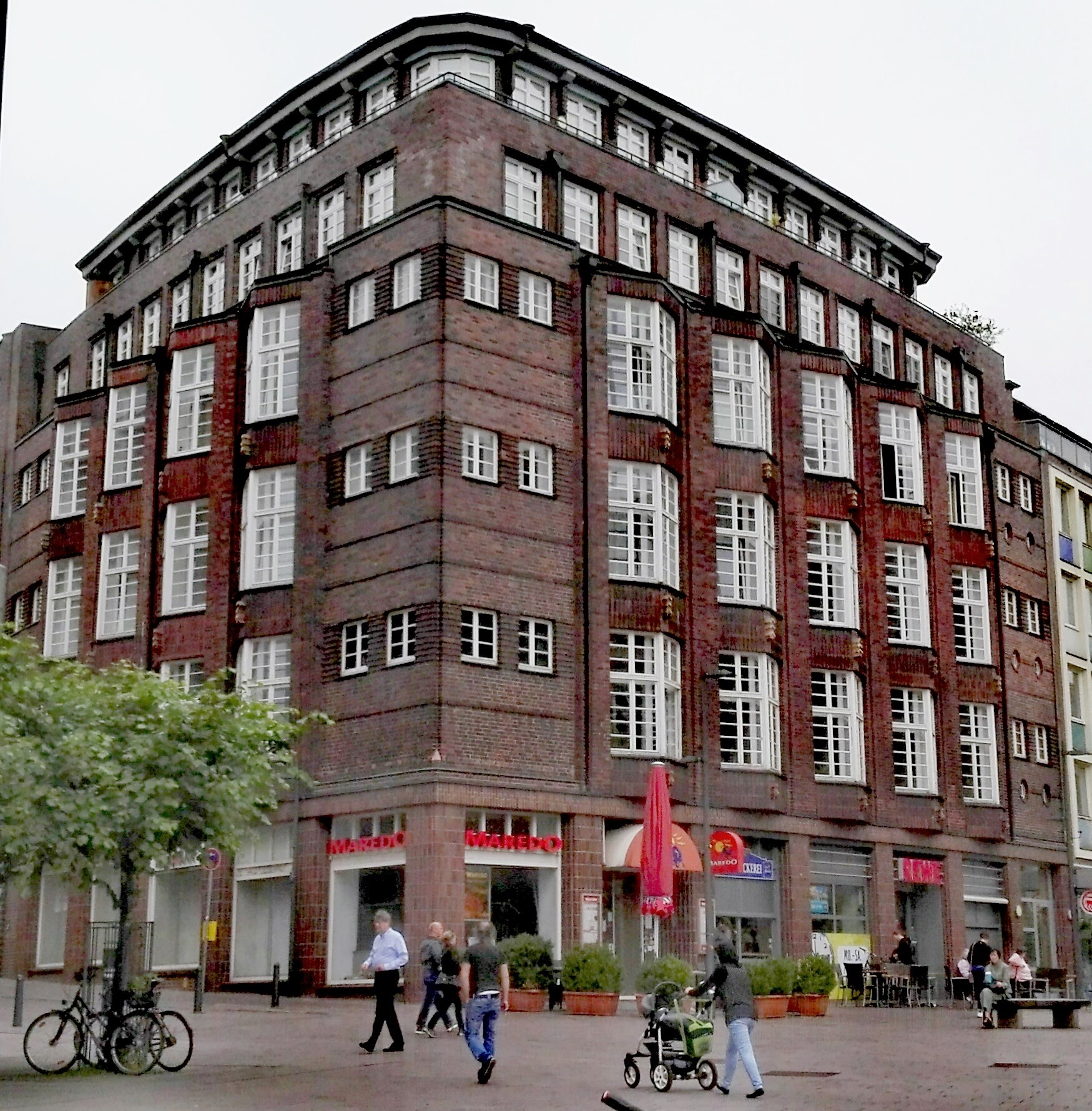
Department store at Klingenberg, Lübeck

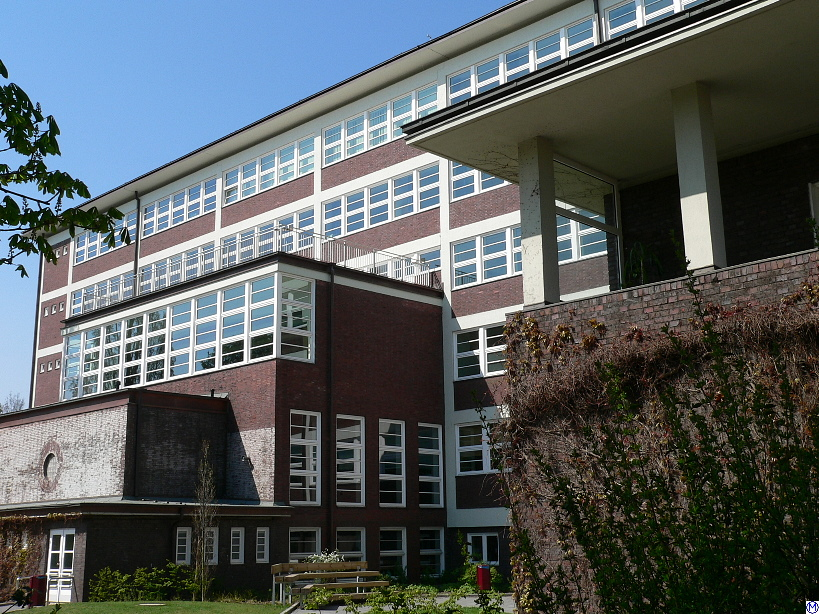
Jarrestadt school, Hamburg

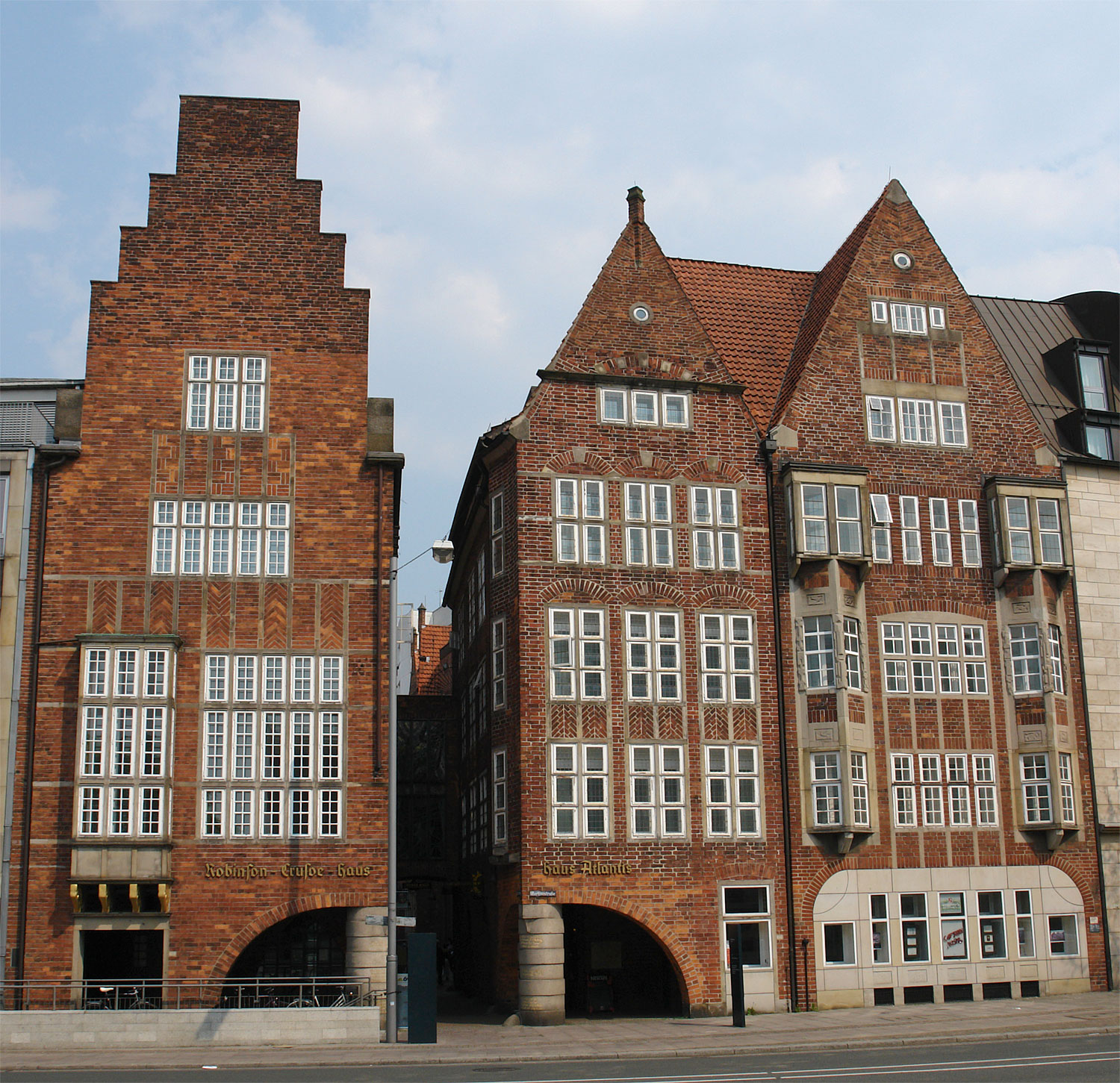
Böttcherstrasse, Bremen

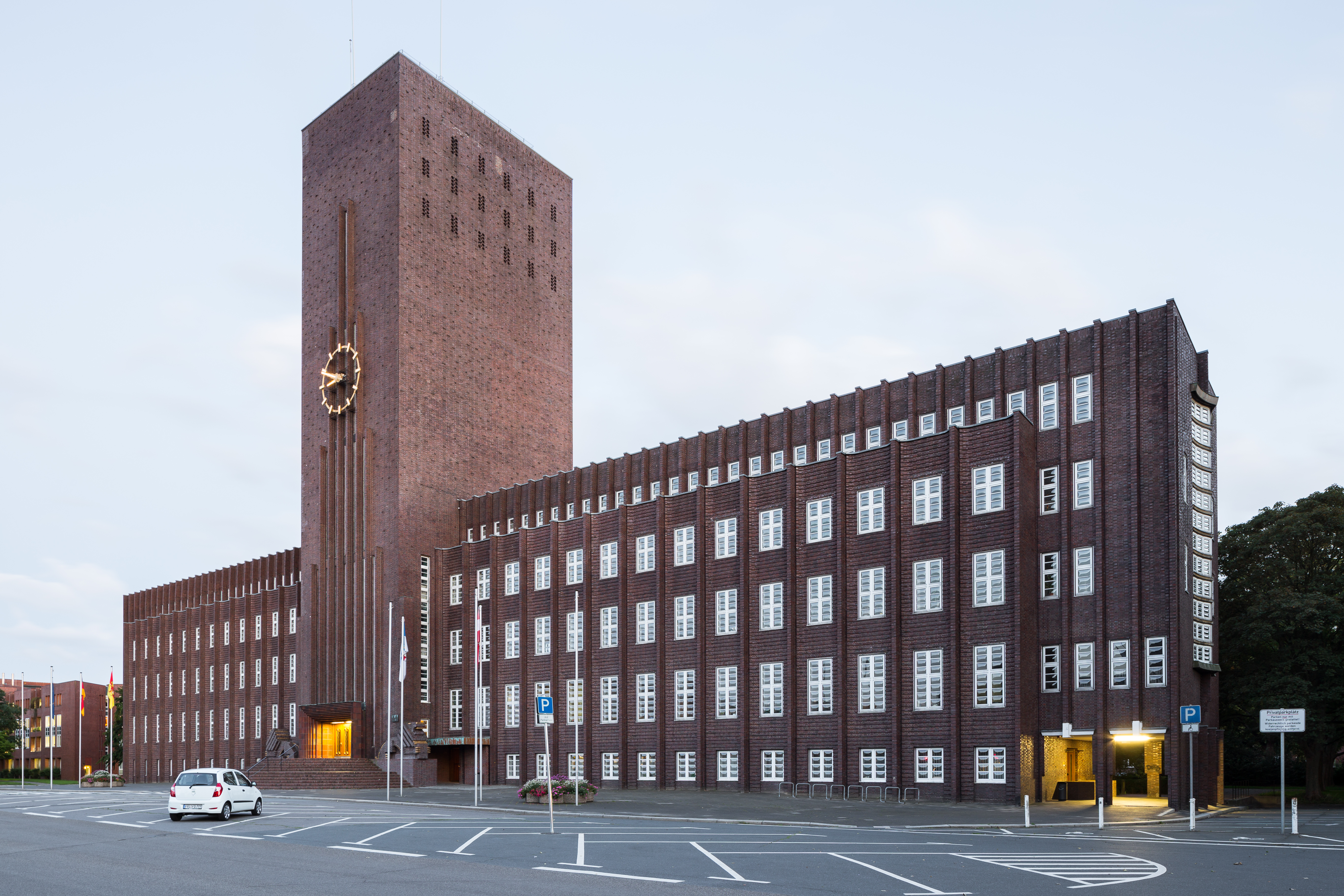
City hall, Wilhelmshaven

== The Ruhr ==
Brick Expressionism had its densest distribution in the Ruhr area, developing the character of a regional style. The material could withstand difficult industrial conditions and permitted the creation of well-balanced and varied facade designs with relatively little effort. Hard-fired clinker was comparatively expensive, so many buildings were designed with part-clinkered and part-whitewashed facades. Examples were created all over the Ruhr, including industrial architecture (assembly halls, office buildings, water towers, etc.) and residential buildings. Brick was also used for representative buildings, such as town halls, post offices, churches and villas.

An important example is Alfred Fischer's Hans-Sachs-Haus in Gelsenkirchen, planned as multi-functional a building but eventually used as the city hall. Its comparatively simply brick facade and rounded corners characterise it as a synthesis between expressionism and New Objectivity.

Also in Gelsenkirchen, in the Ückendorf area, is the main work of Josef Franke, the Parabola Church of Heilig-Kreuz (Holy Cross). Its vault has the shape of a tall parabola. The top of the square tower is crowned by a brick-built figure of Christ. The church was deconsecrated on 18 August 2007.

Other important Brick Expressionist buildings in the Ruhr area are the police headquarters, Bert-Brecht-Haus and city hall in Oberhausen, Alfred Fischer's offices for the Regionalverband Ruhrgebiet (regional development authority) in Essen, the BOGESTRA building and the police headquarters in Bochum, and the pediatric surgery ward of Dortmund city hospital.

Examples in the Ruhr, Westphalia and Rhineland regions

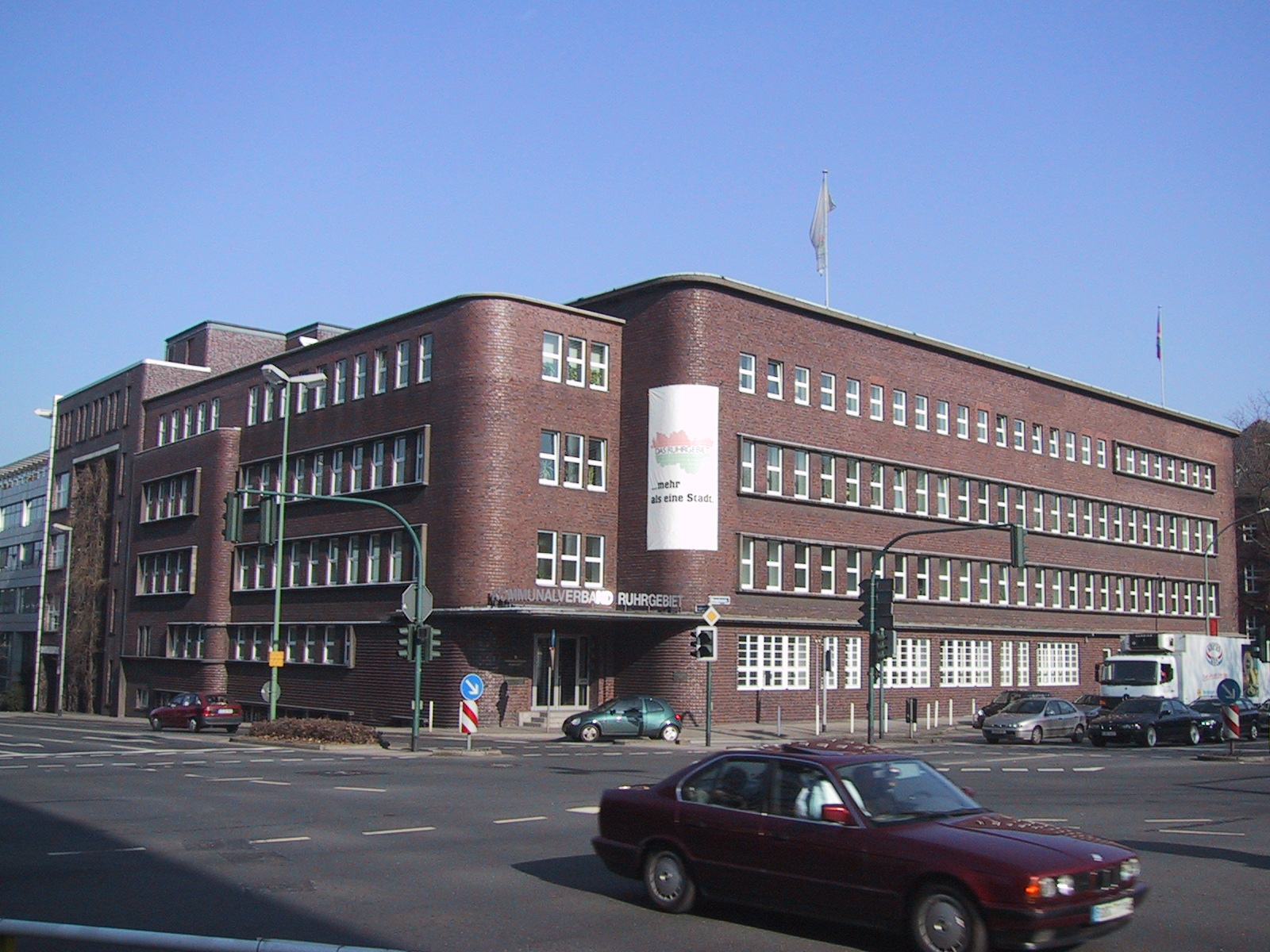
Regionalverband headquarters, Essen

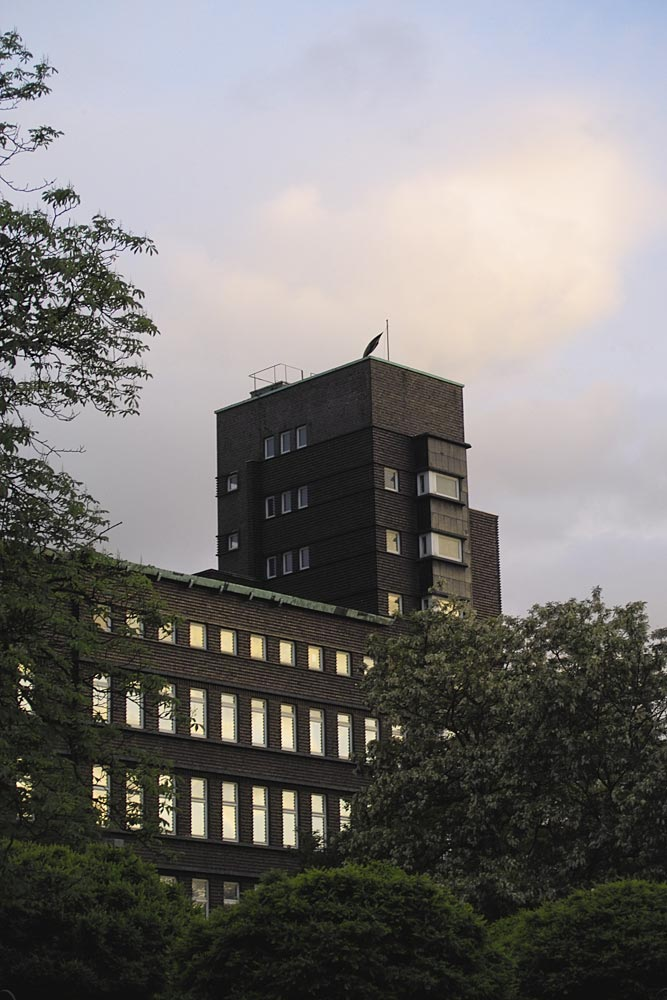
Hans-Sachs-Haus, Gelsenkirchen

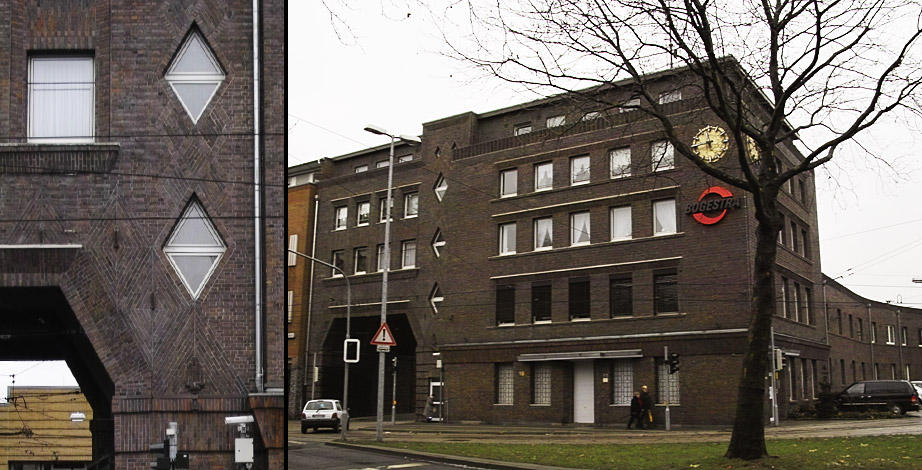
Tramyard, Gelsenkirchen

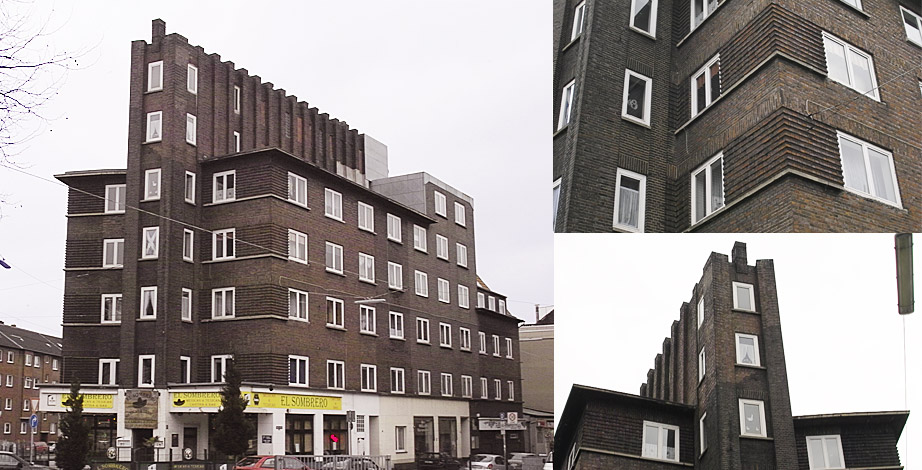
Shop and apartment house "Ring-Eck", Gelsenkirchen

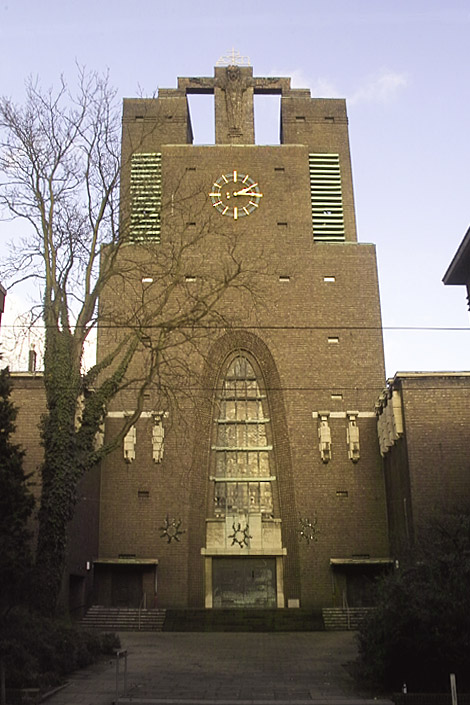
Heilig-Kreuz-Kirche, Gelsenkirchen-Ückendorf

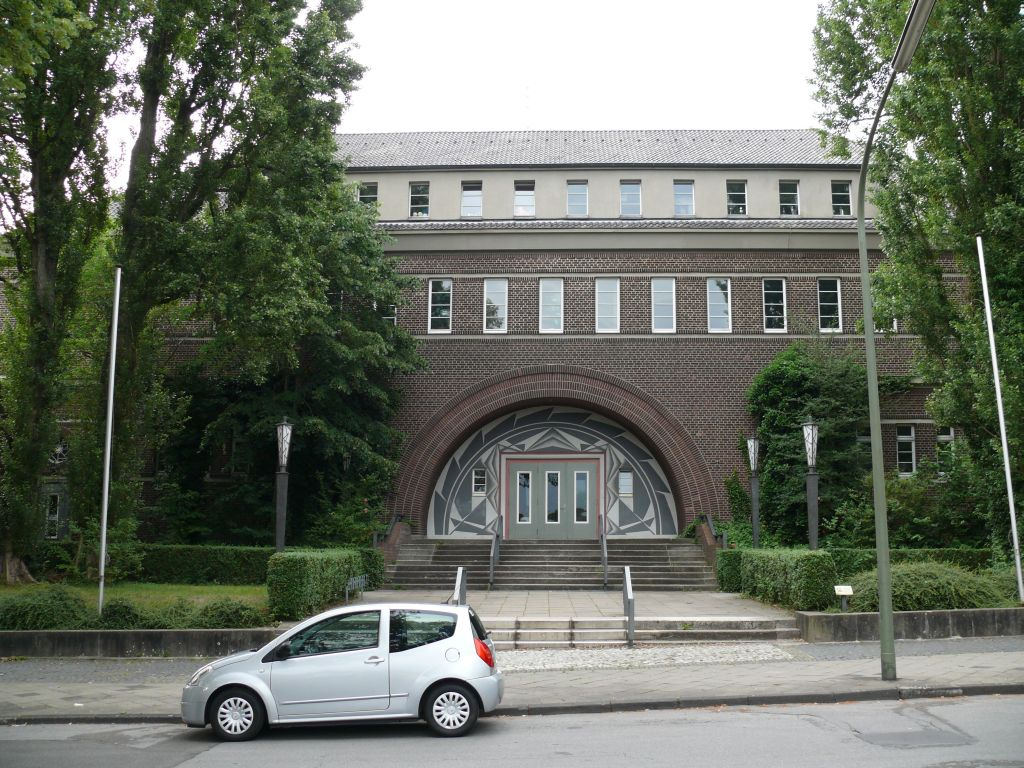
Rotthausen multi-purpose hall, Gelsenkirchen

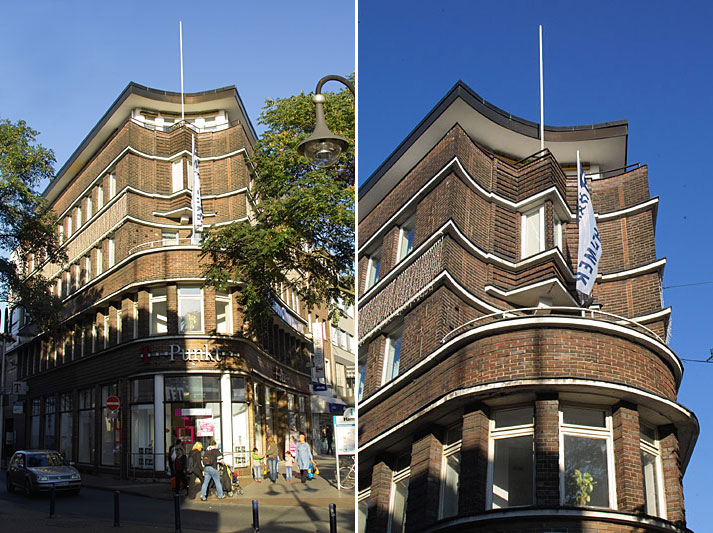
Shop and apartment house Lommel, Hamm by Max Krusemark, 1927

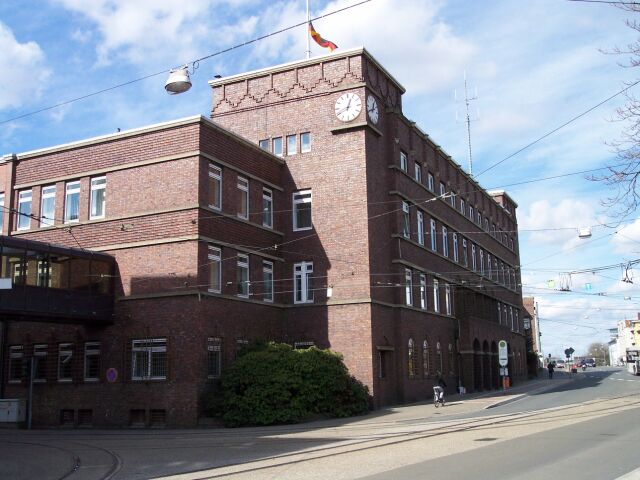
BOGESTRA headquarters, Bochum

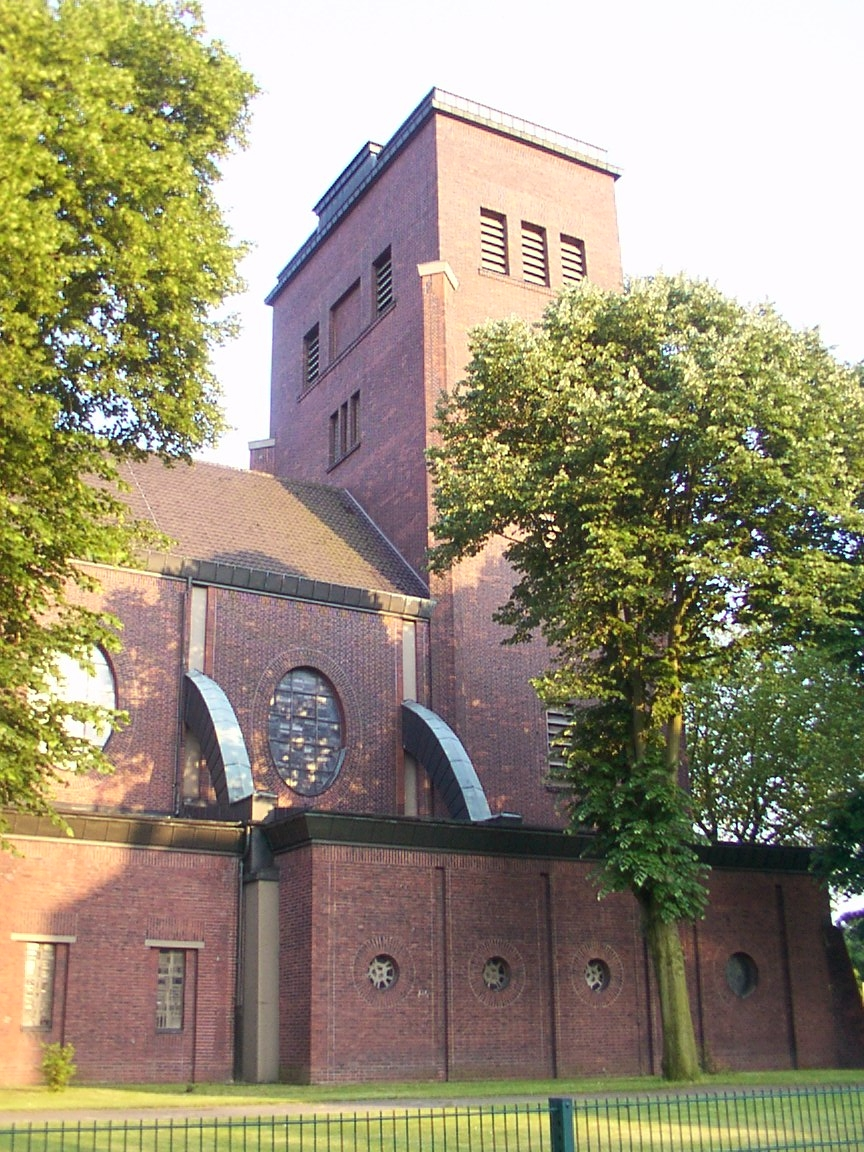
St. Antonius, Castrop-Rauxel-Ickern

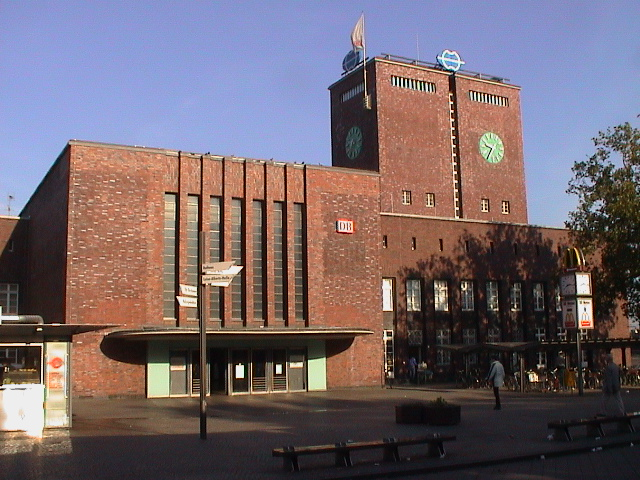
Oberhausen Central Station

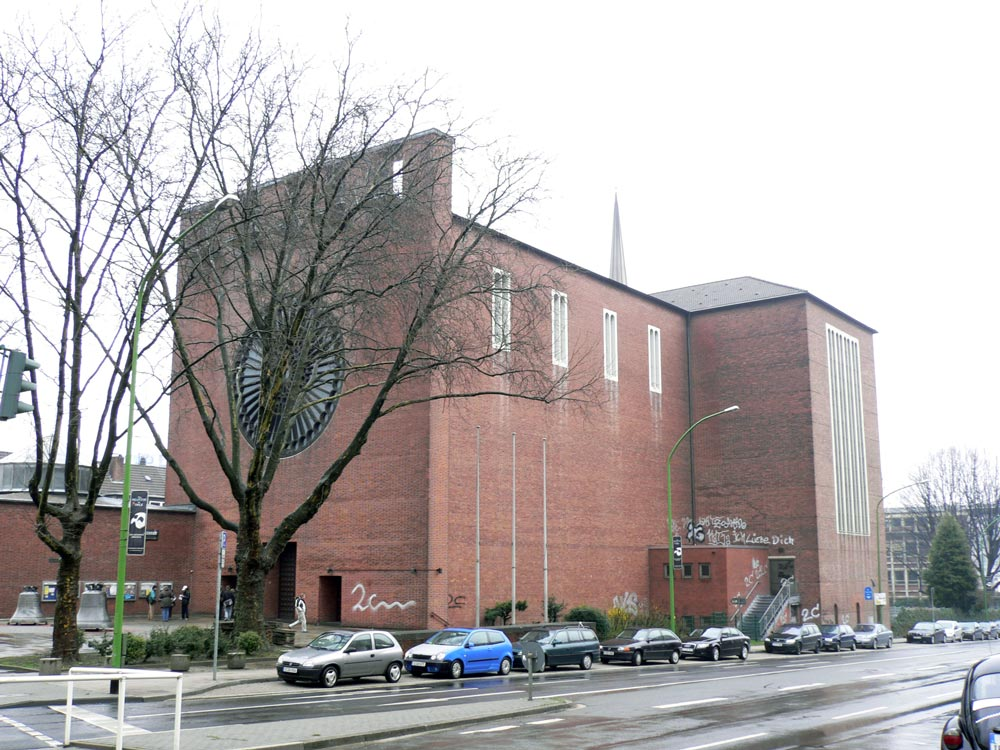
St. Engelbert, Essen

== Berlin ==
Berlin examples include the Kreuzkirche (Evangelical Church of the Cross) in Berlin-Schmargendorf and Fritz Höger's Evangelical Church at Hohenzollernplatz (1933).

Examples in Berlin

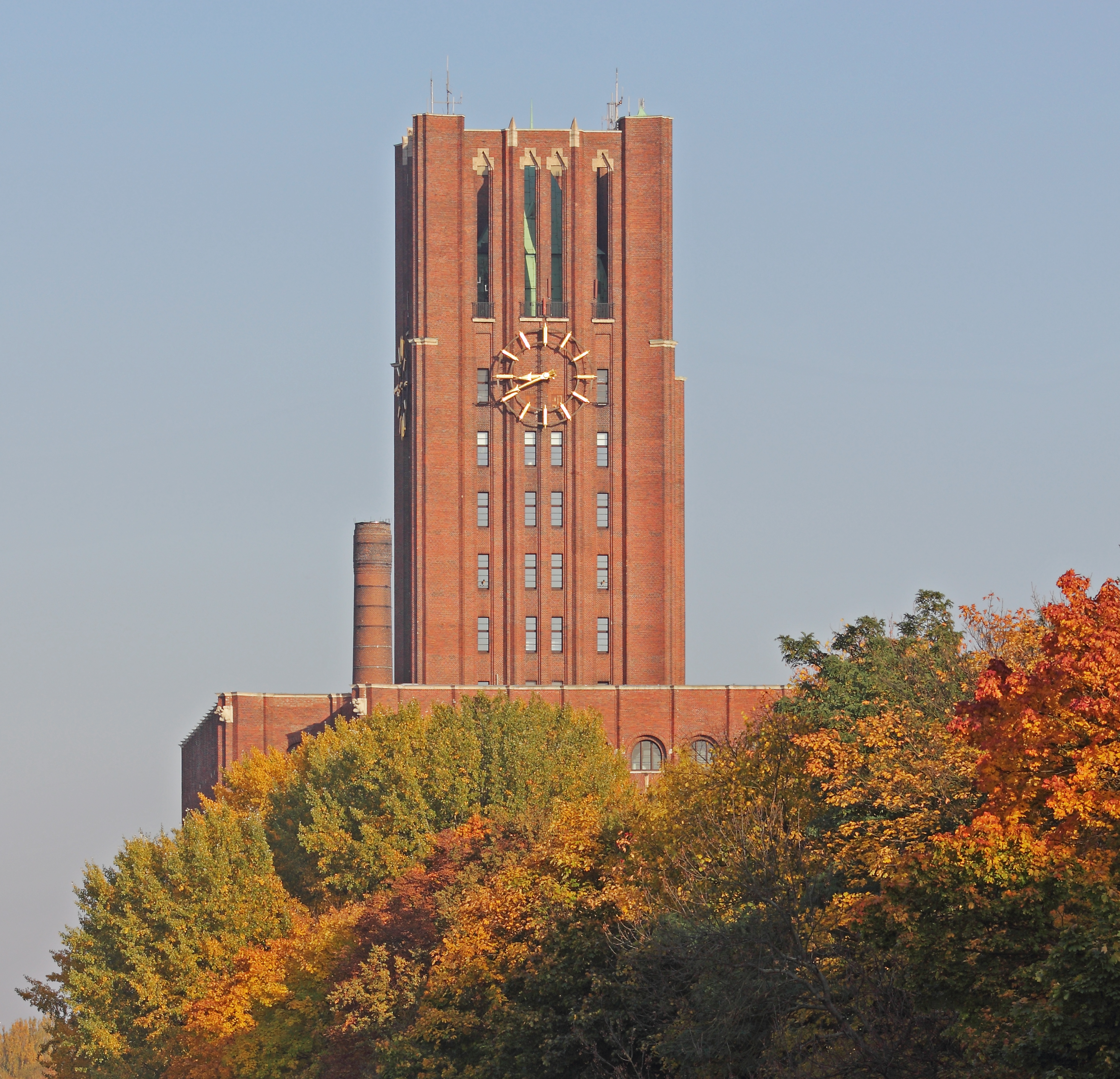
Berlin, Ullsteinhaus

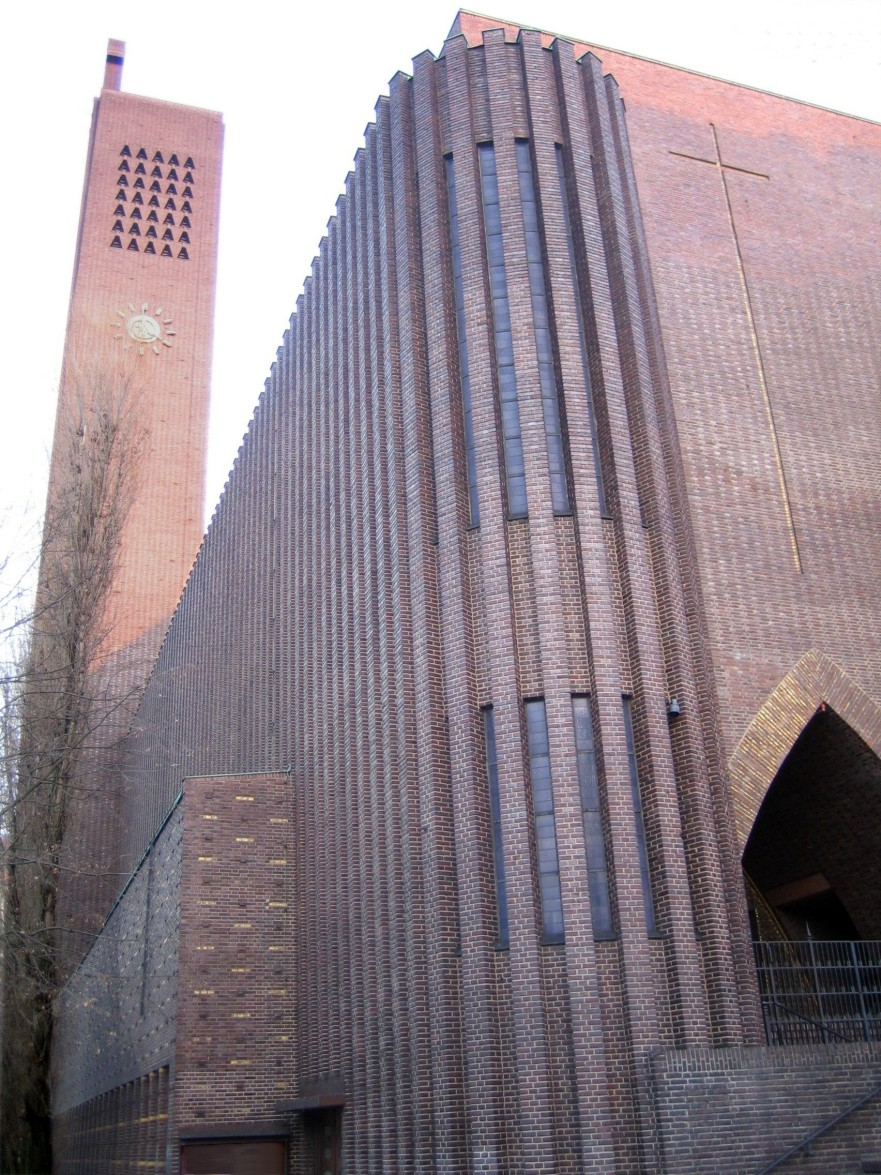
Berlin, Kirche am Hohenzollerndamm

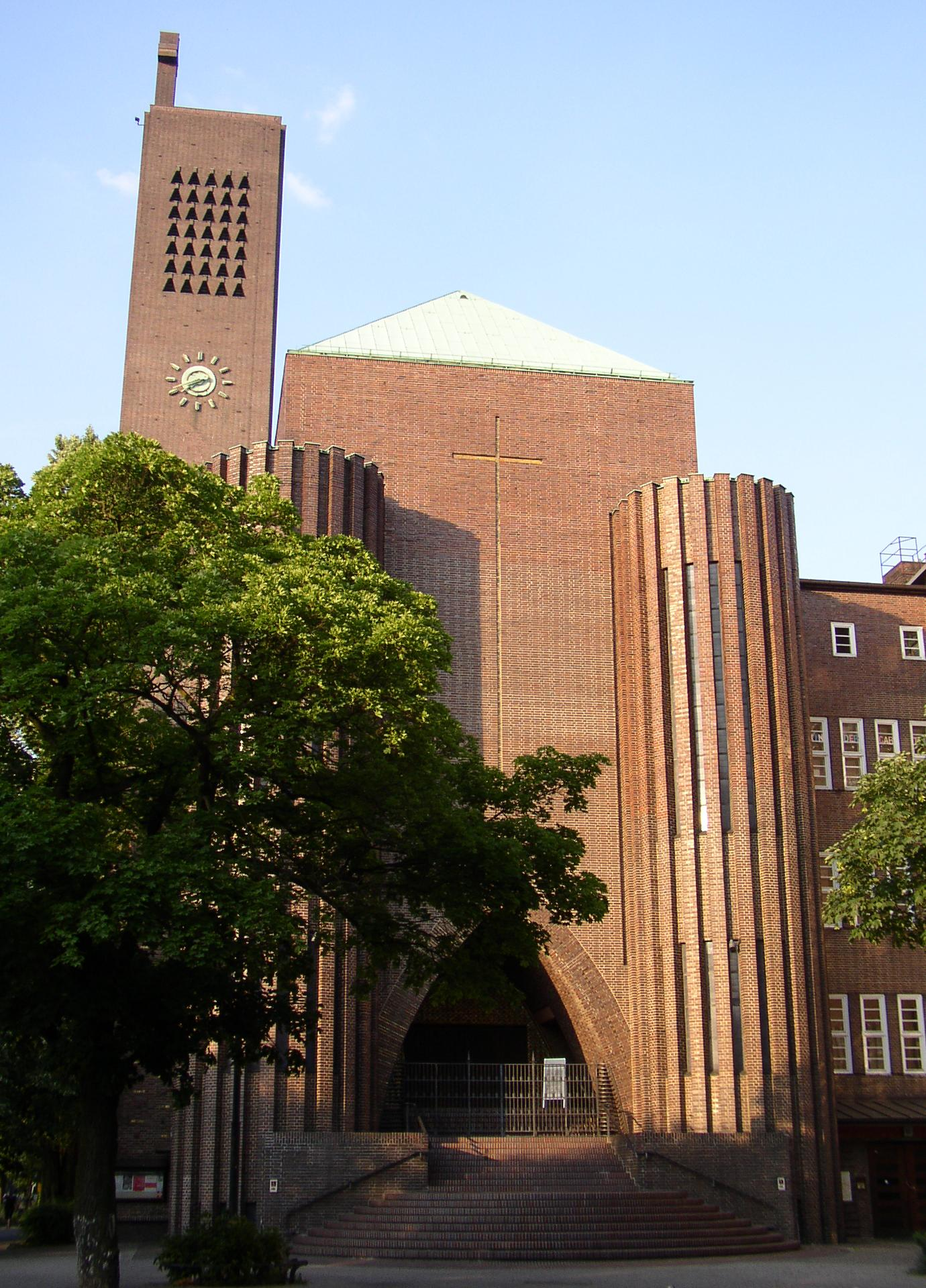
Berlin, Kirche am Hohenzollerndamm

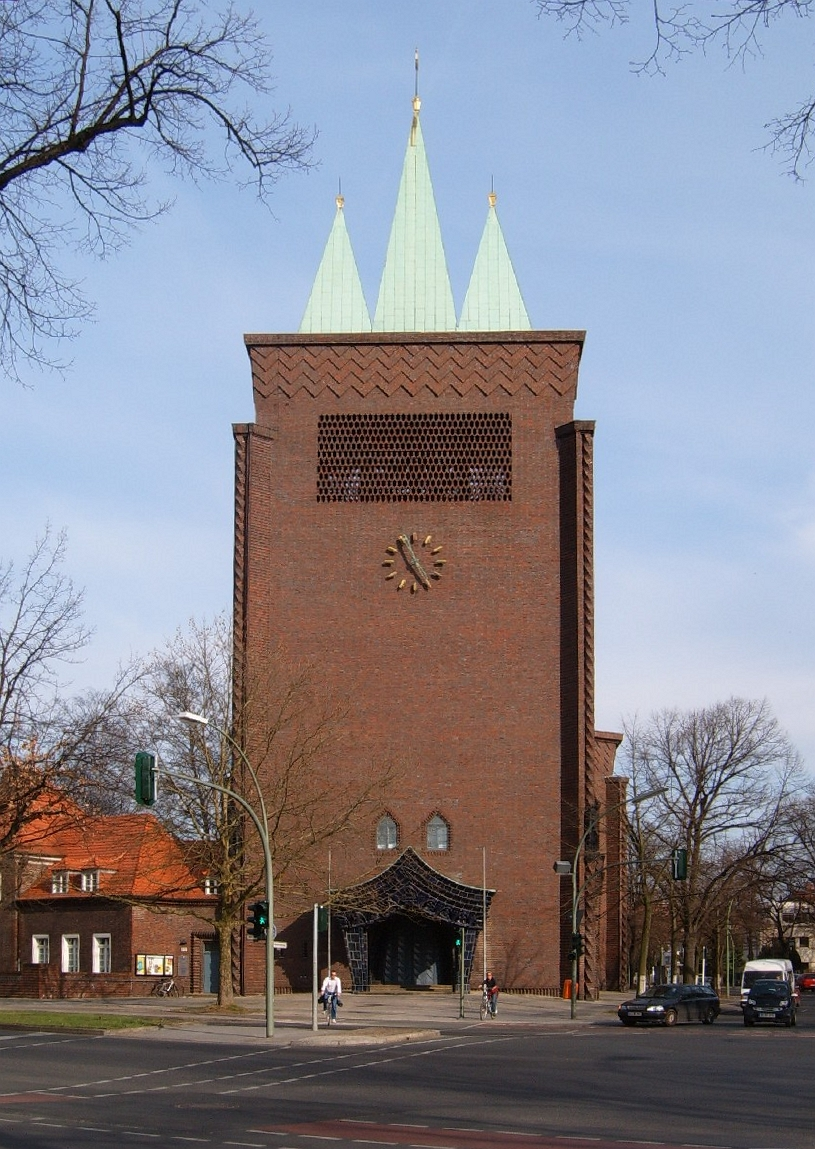
Kreuzkirche in Berlin-Schmargendorf

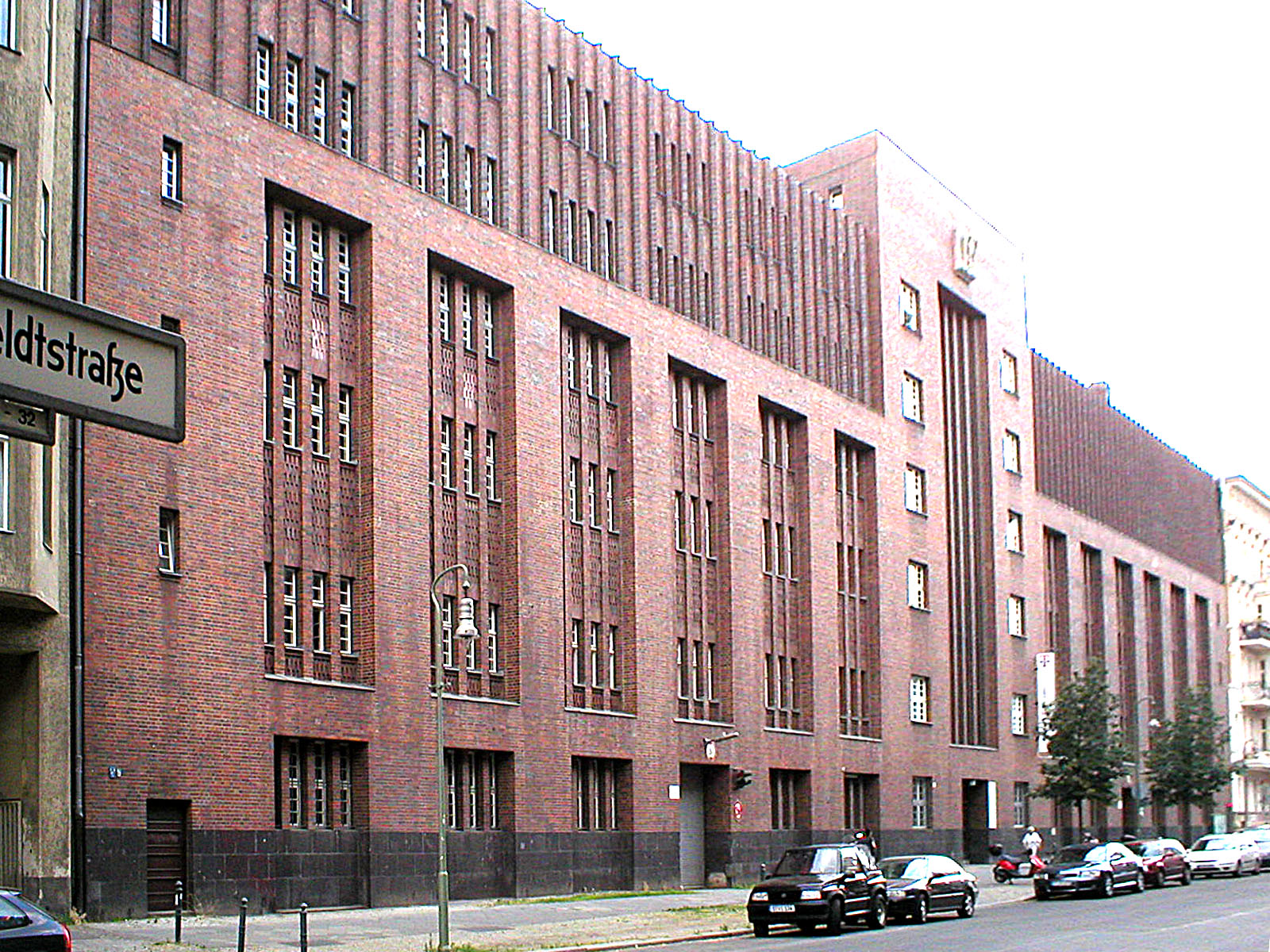
Fernmeldeamt, Winterfeldtstraße

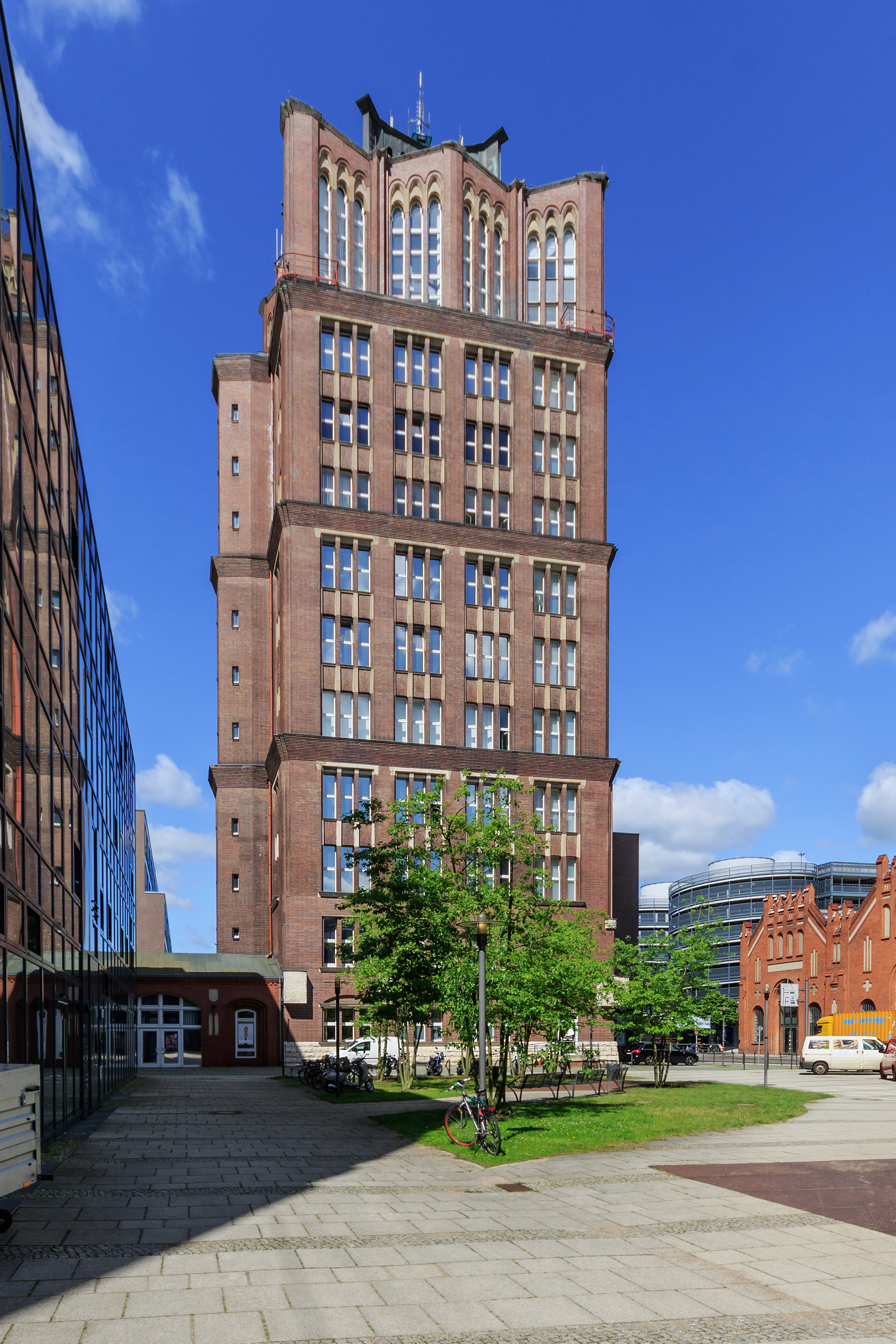
Borsig-Tower in Berlin-Tegel from 1922 to 1925

== Netherlands ==
Examples in the Netherlands

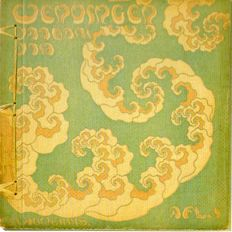
'Wendingen' 1918–1932, Amsterdam School

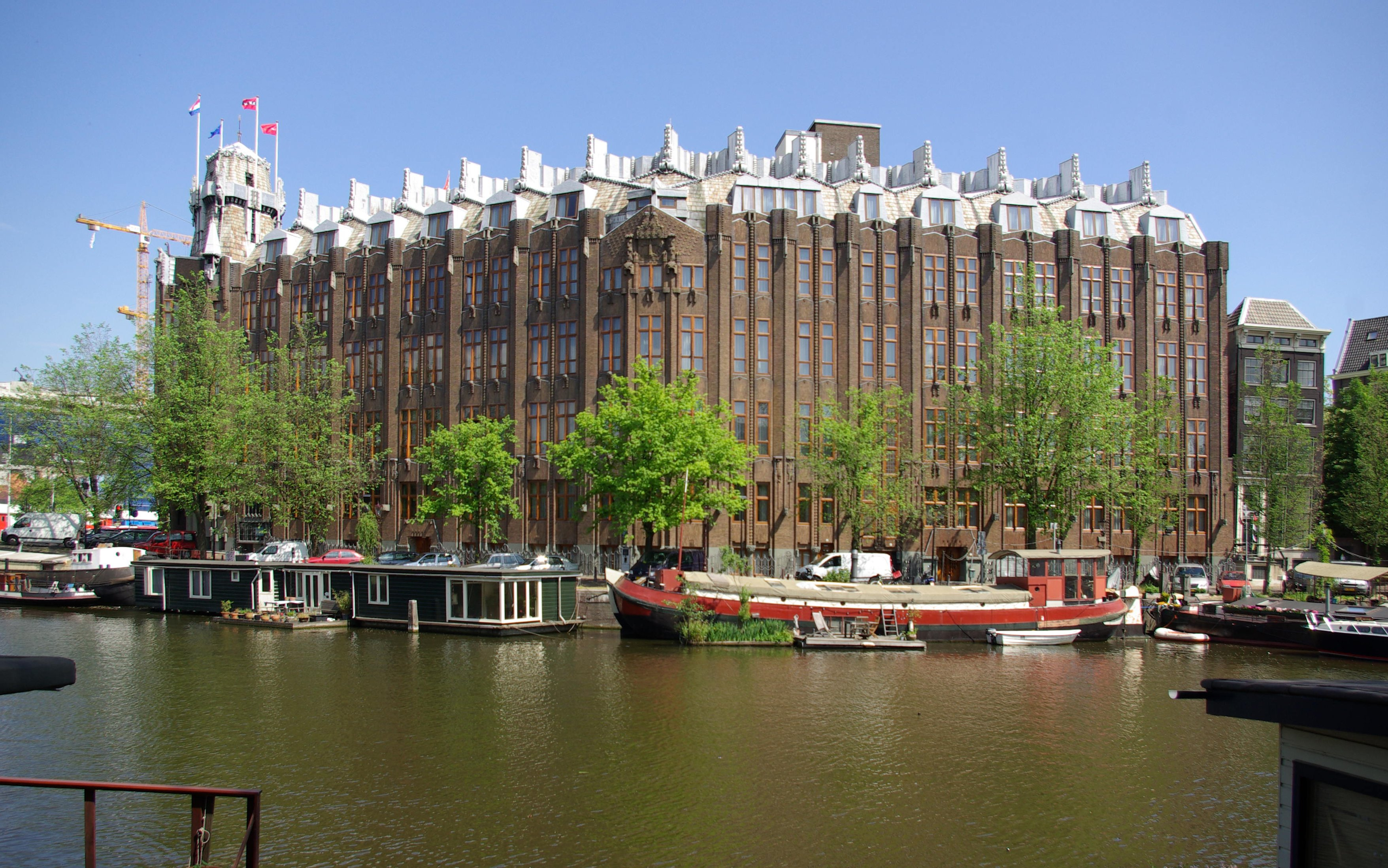
Scheepvaarthuis, Amsterdam

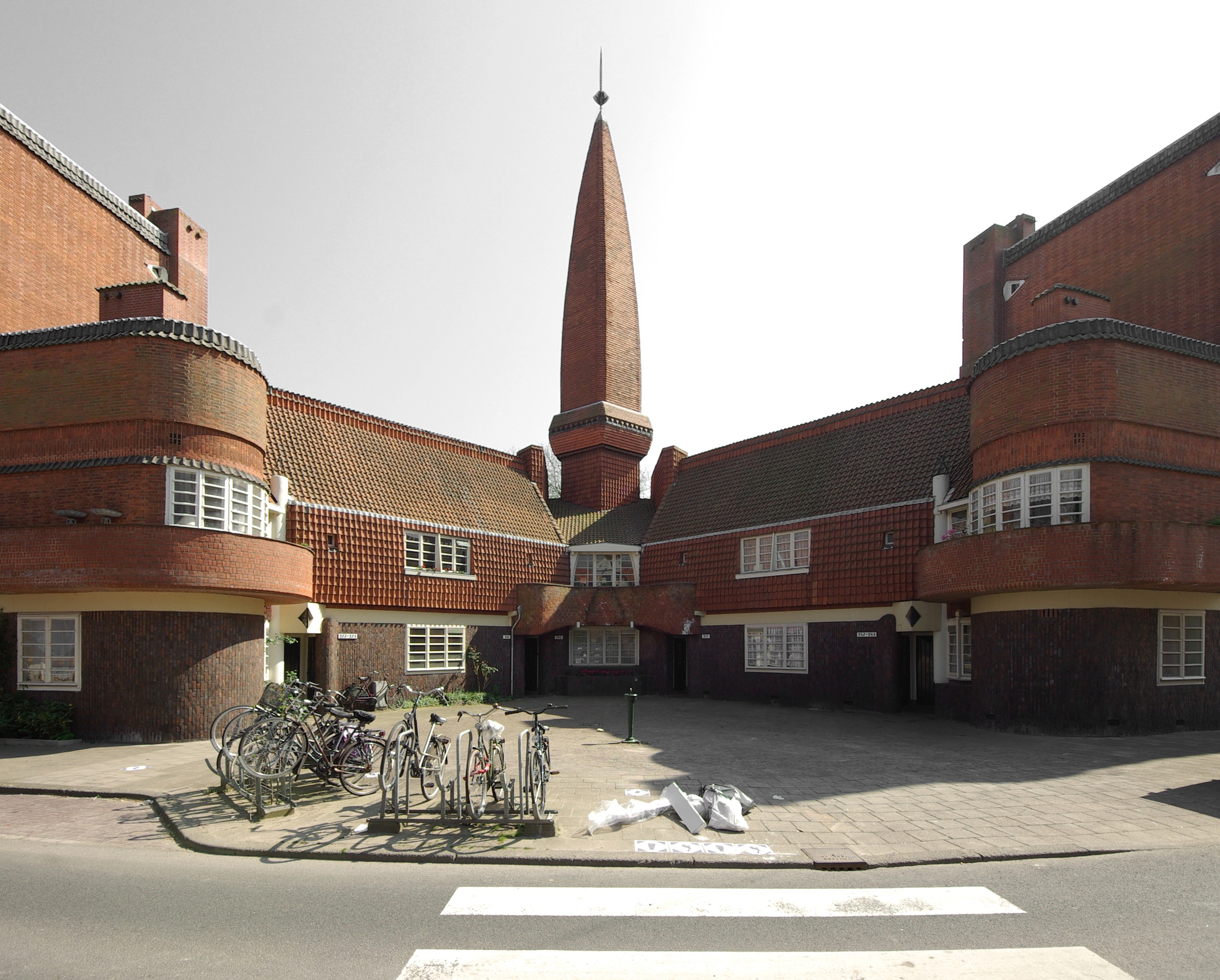
Het Schip, Amsterdam

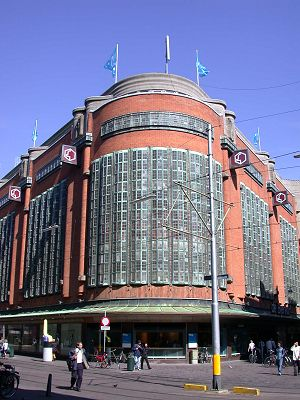
De Bijenkorf, The Hague

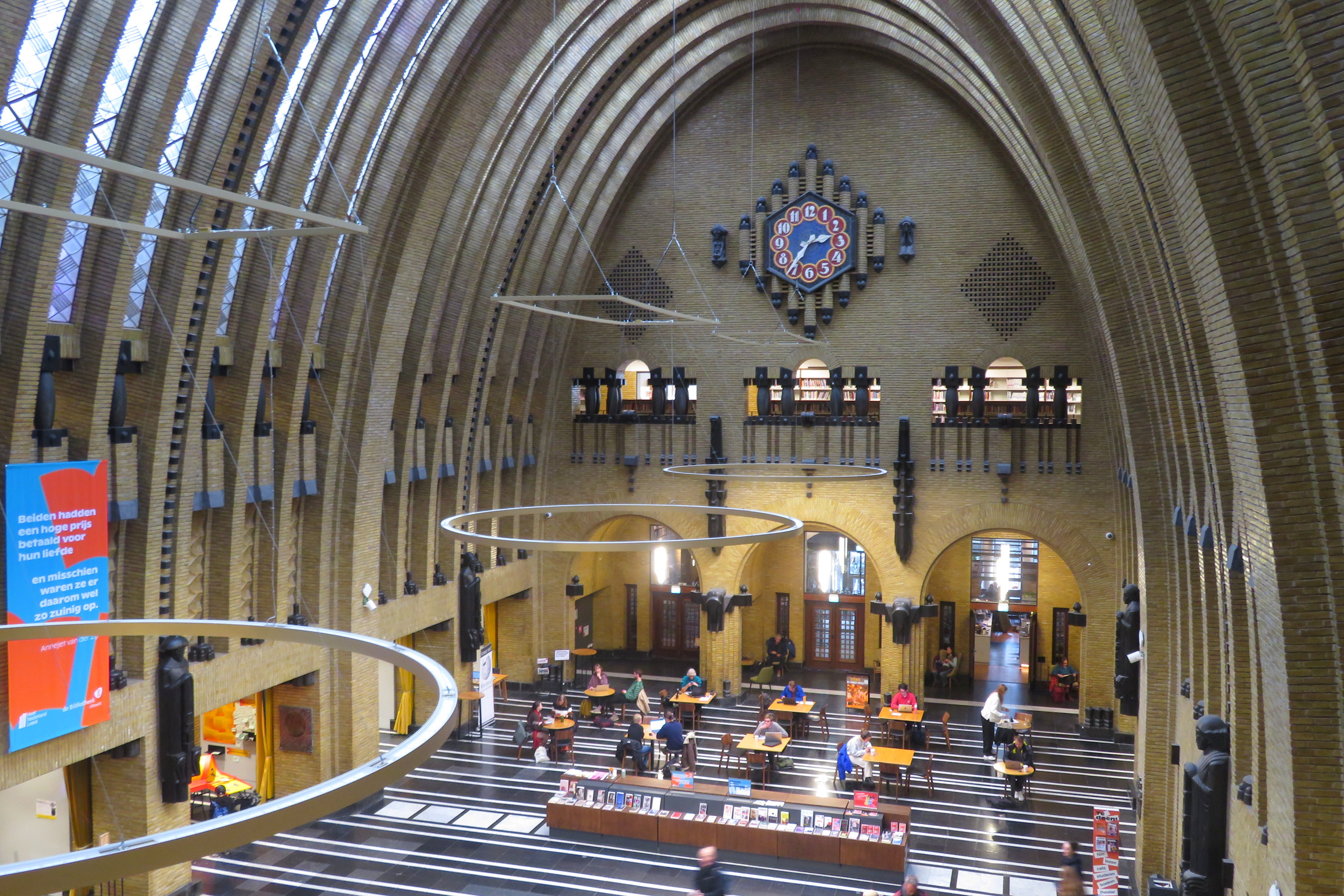
Post Office/Library, Utrecht

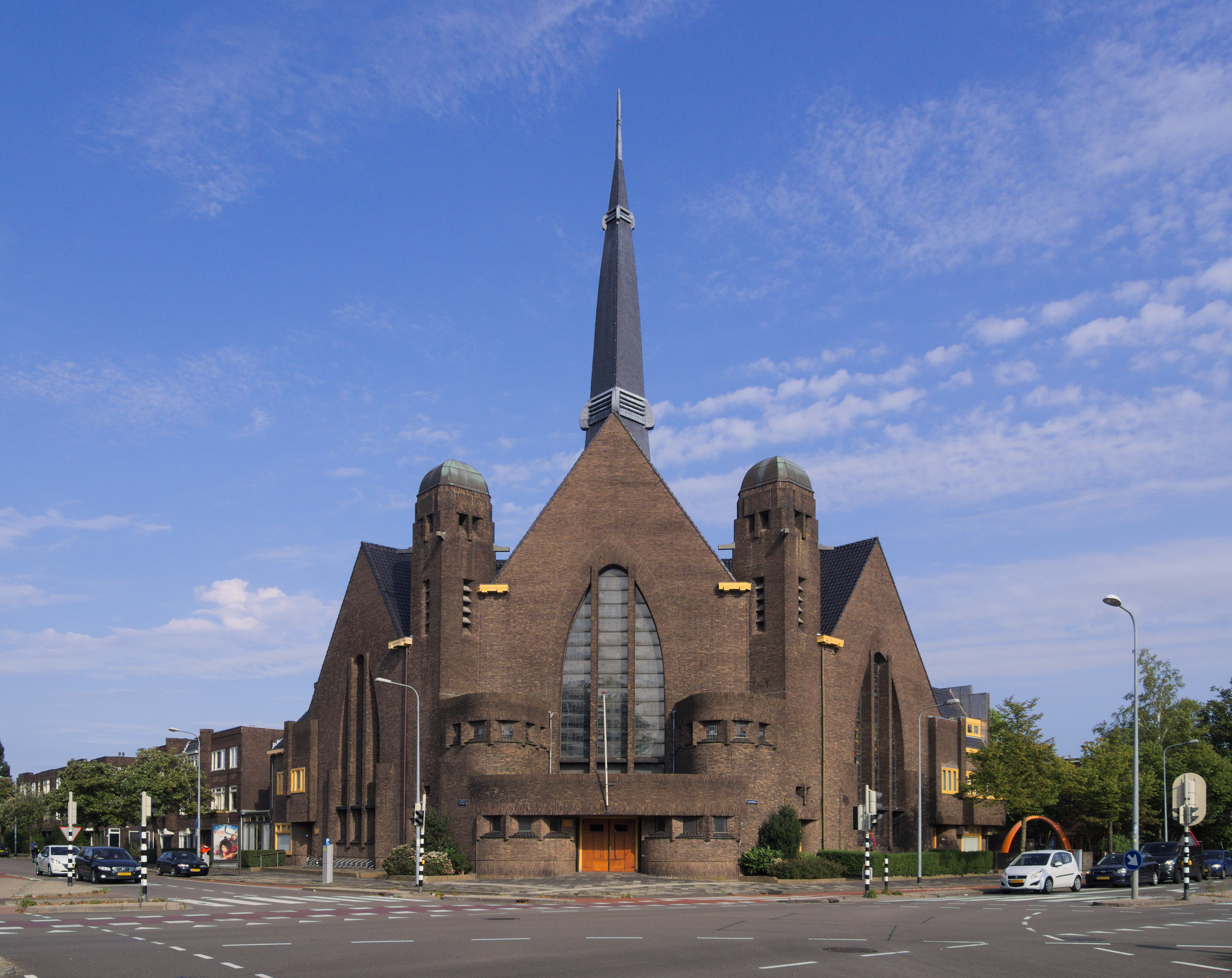
Oosterkerk, Groningen

== Elsewhere ==
Other prominent examples of Brick Expressionism include the Grossmarkthalle in Frankfurt am Main, the Technical Administration Building of Hoechst AG in Frankfurt-Höchst, and Grundtvig's Church in Copenhagen.

Examples of Brick Impressionist architecture outside the core areas

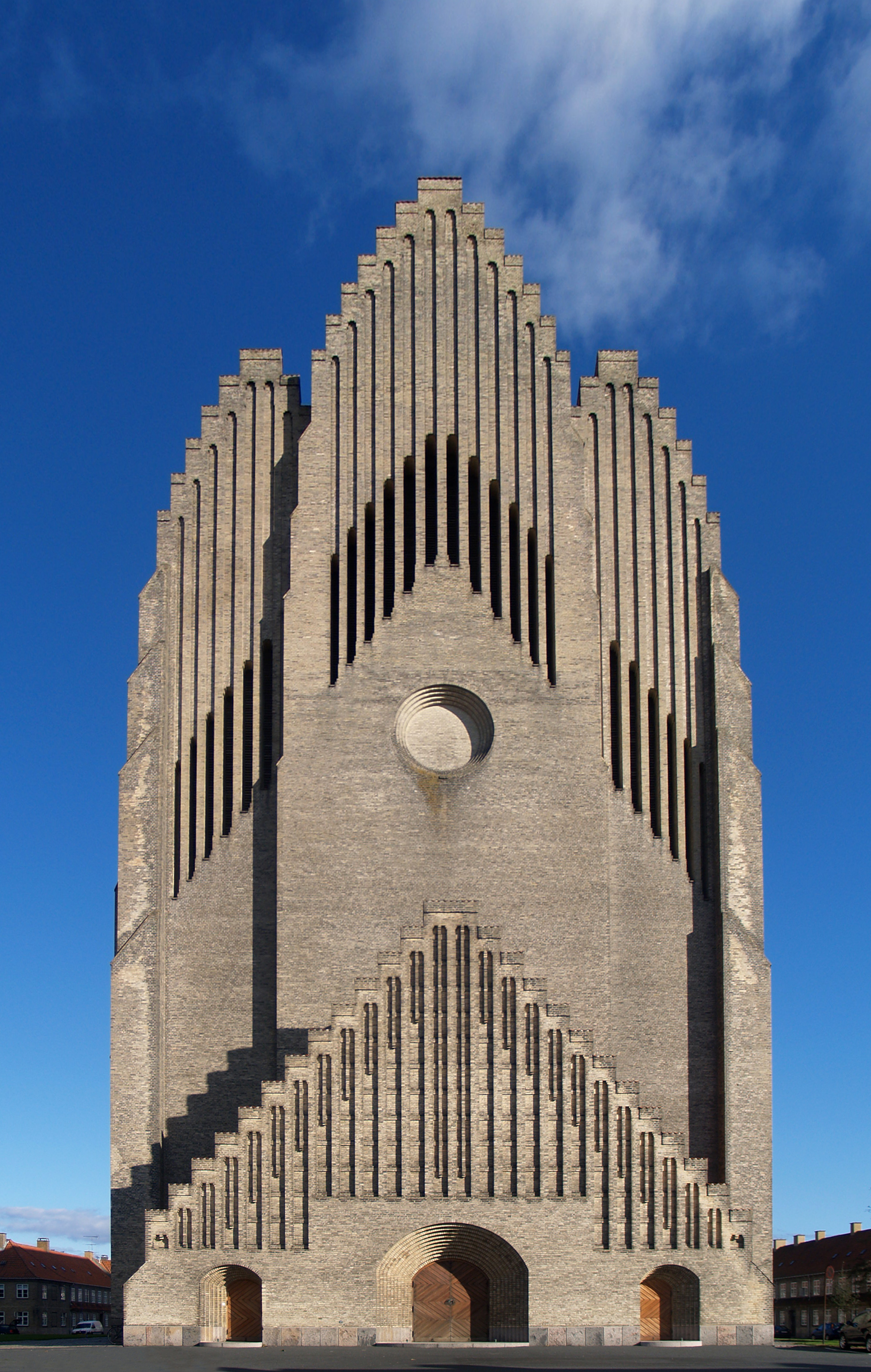
Grundtvig's Church, Copenhagen

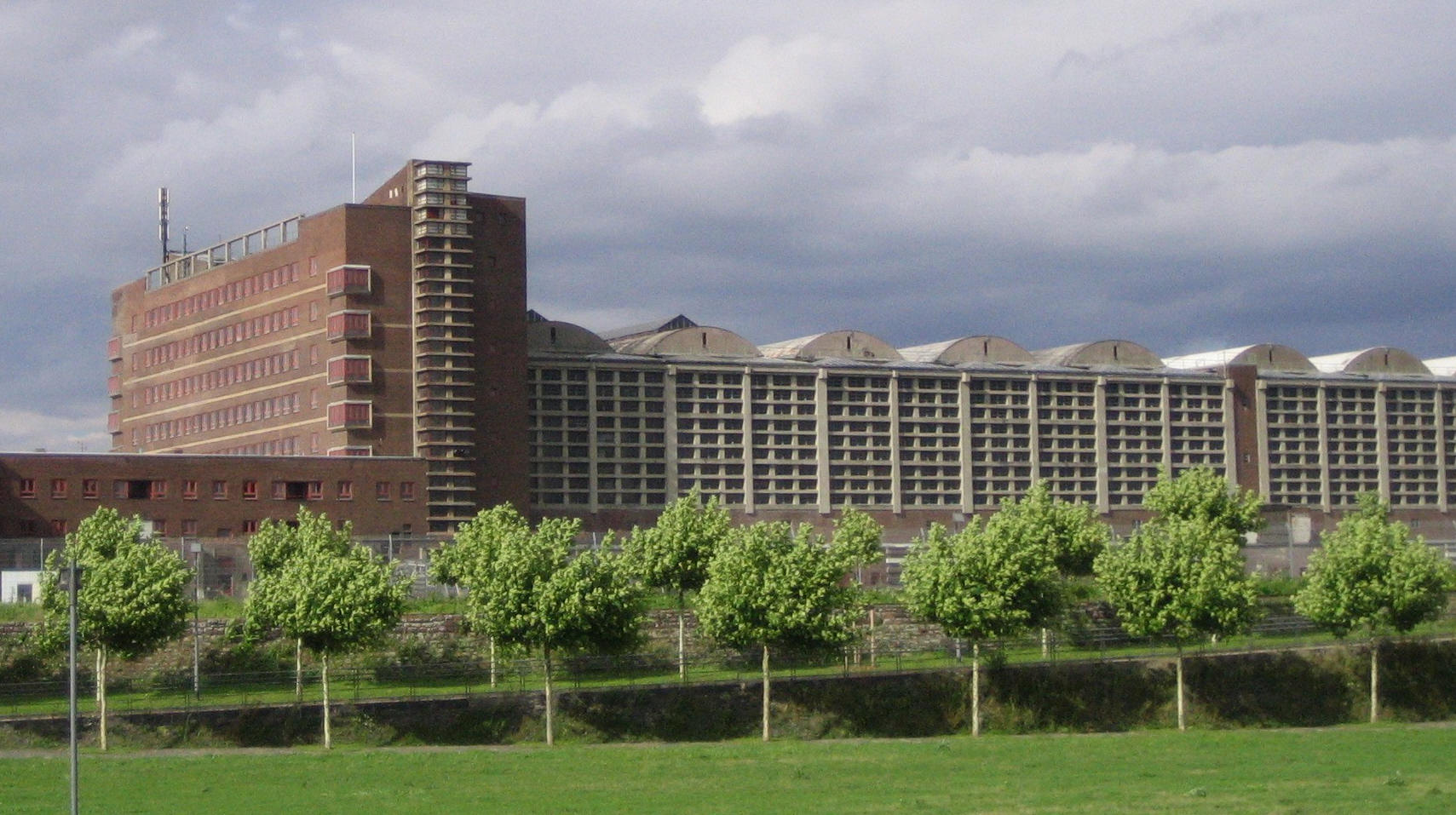
Grossmarkthalle, Frankfurt am Main

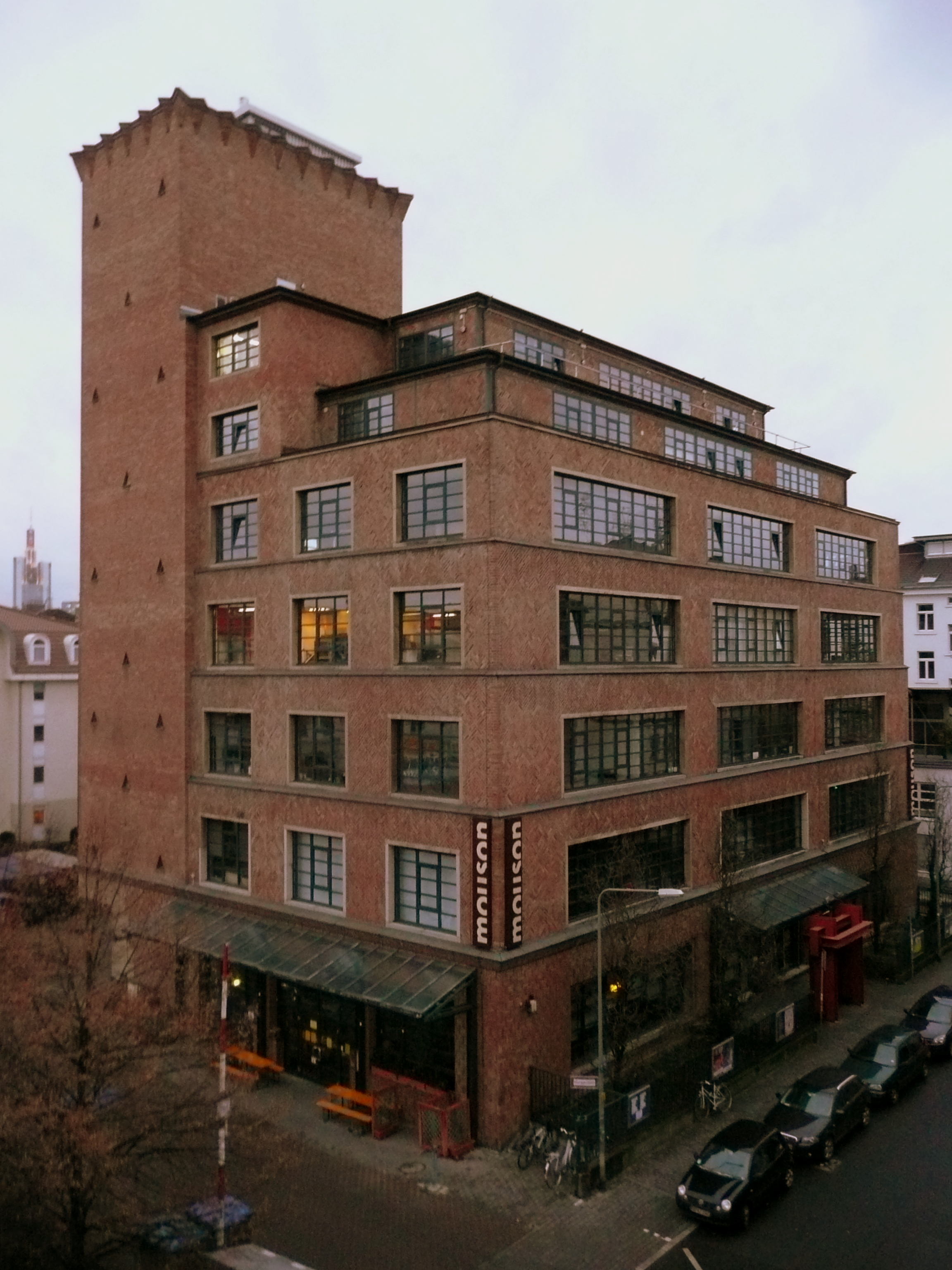
Mousonturm, Frankfurt am Main

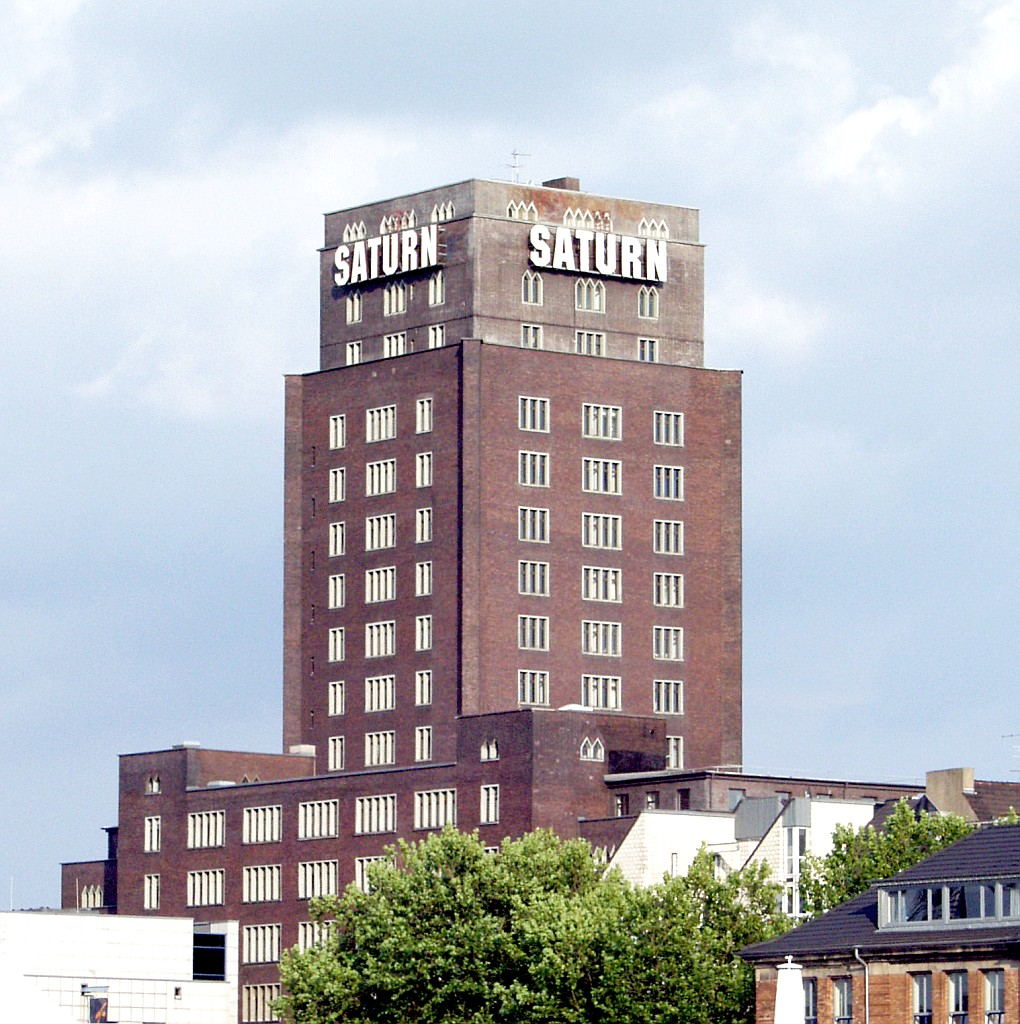
Hansahochhaus, Cologne

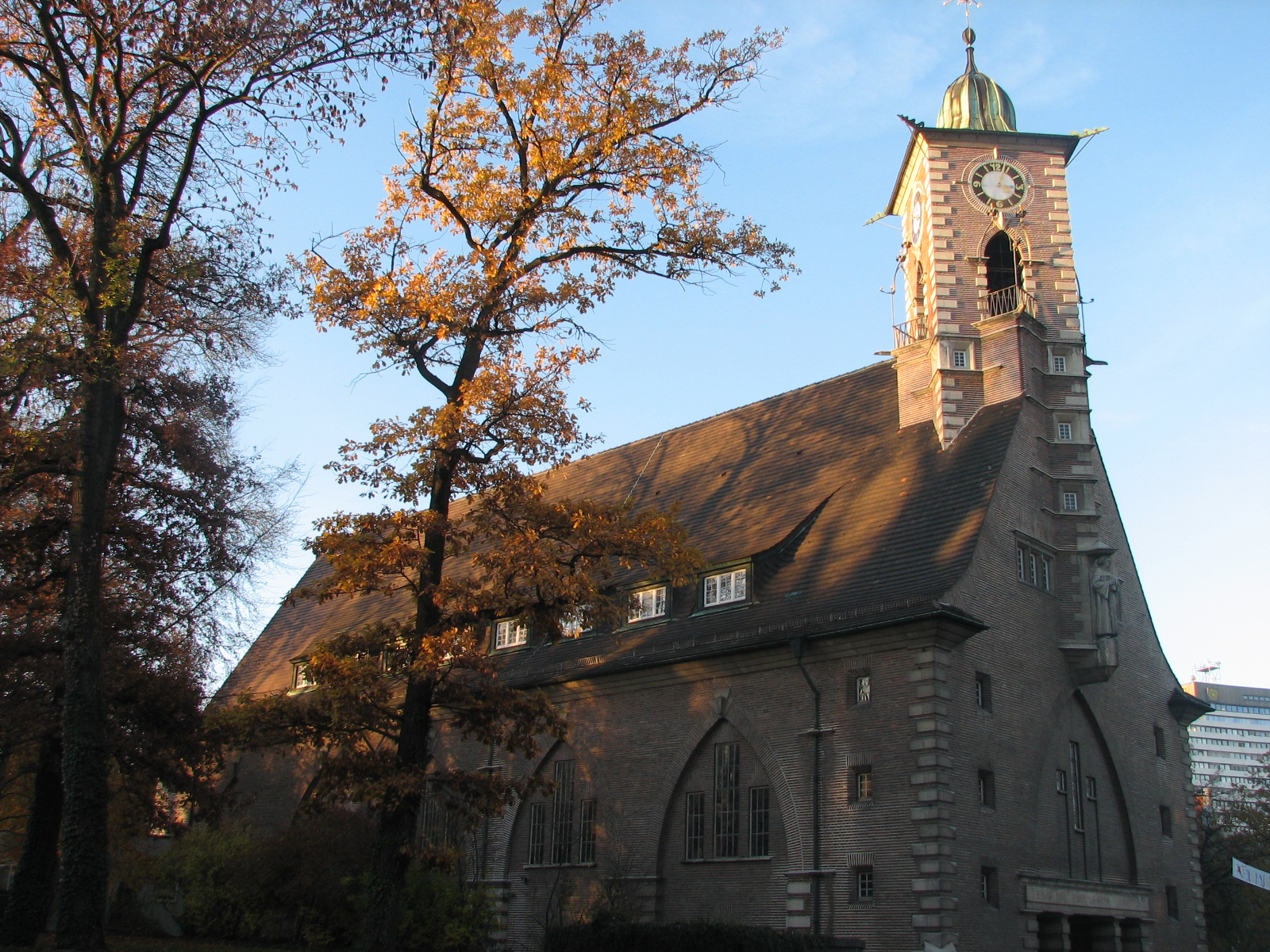
Martin-Luther Church, Ulm

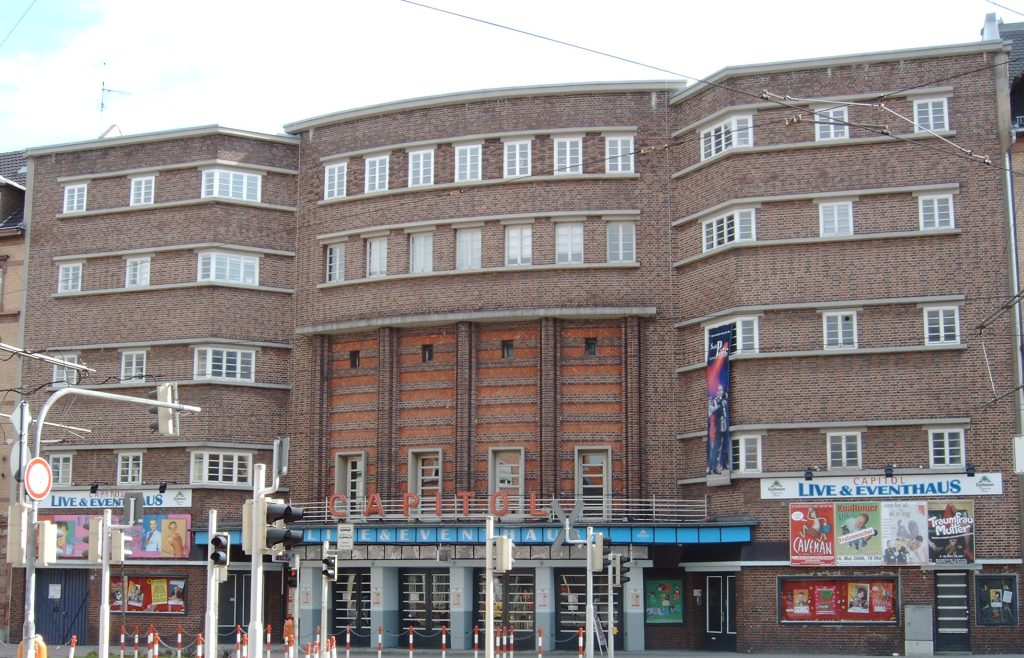
Capitol (originally a cinema), Mannheim

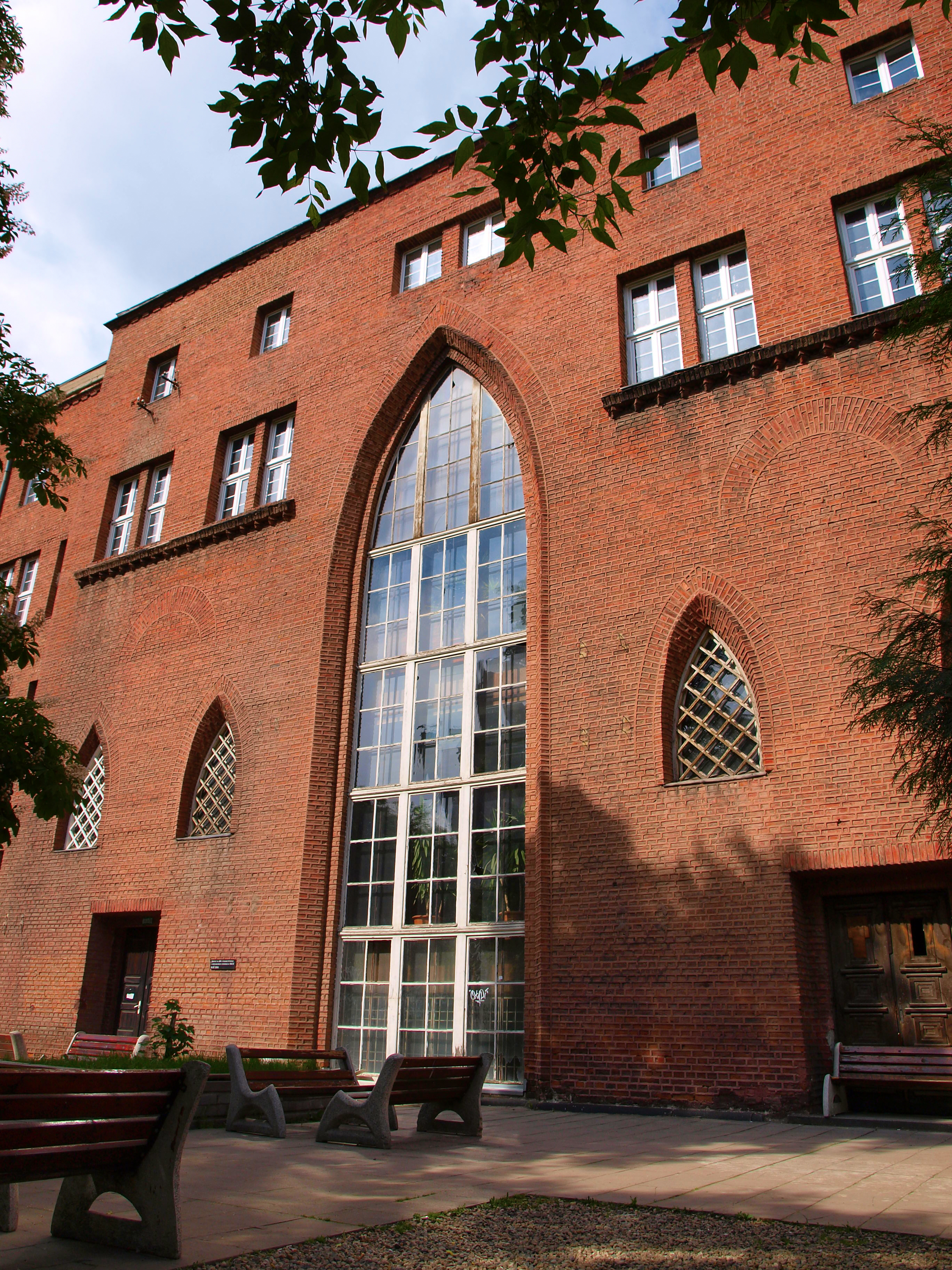
Sofia University Faculty of Biology, Sofia, Bulgaria

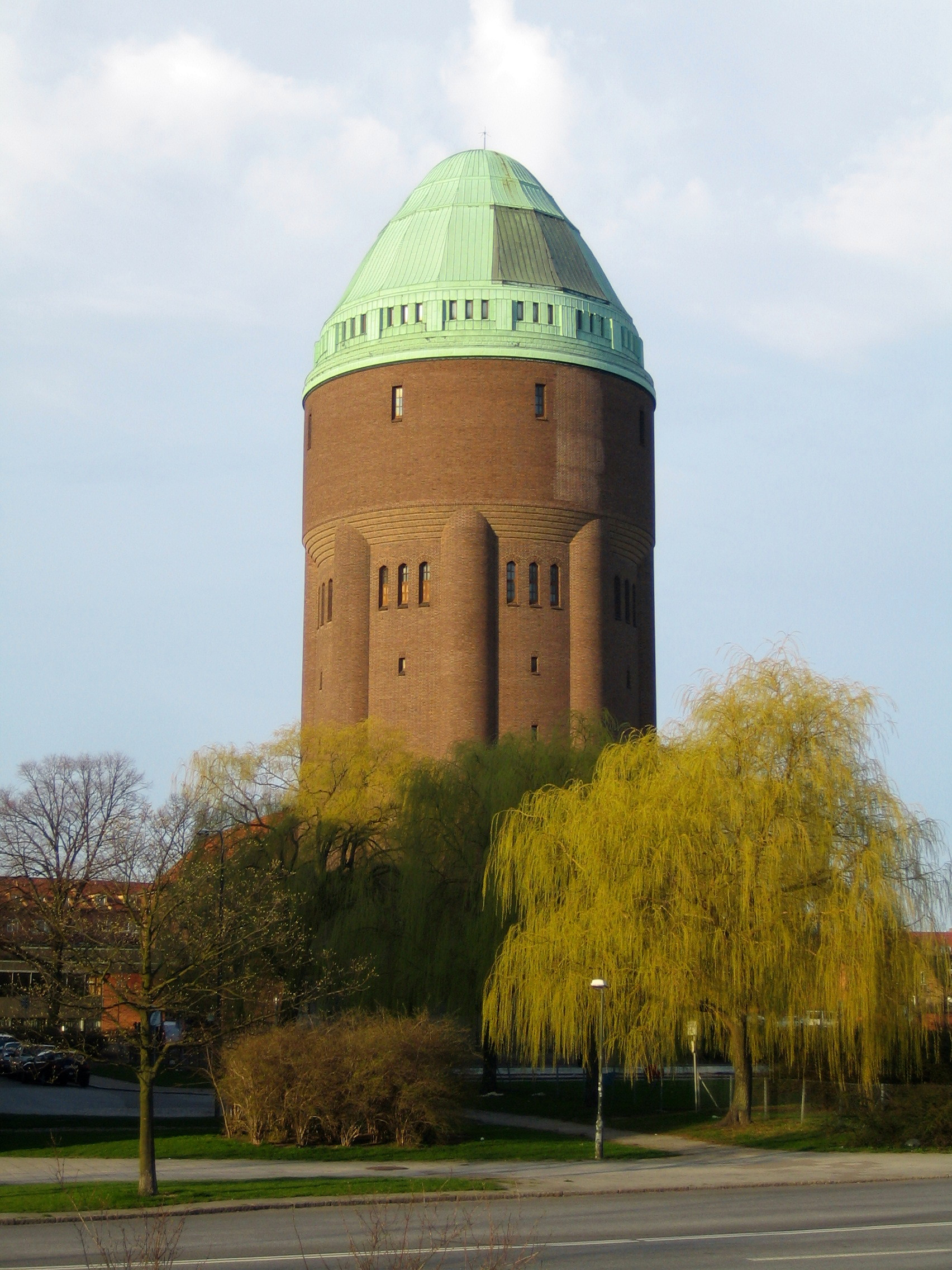
Södervärn Water Tower, Malmö, Sweden

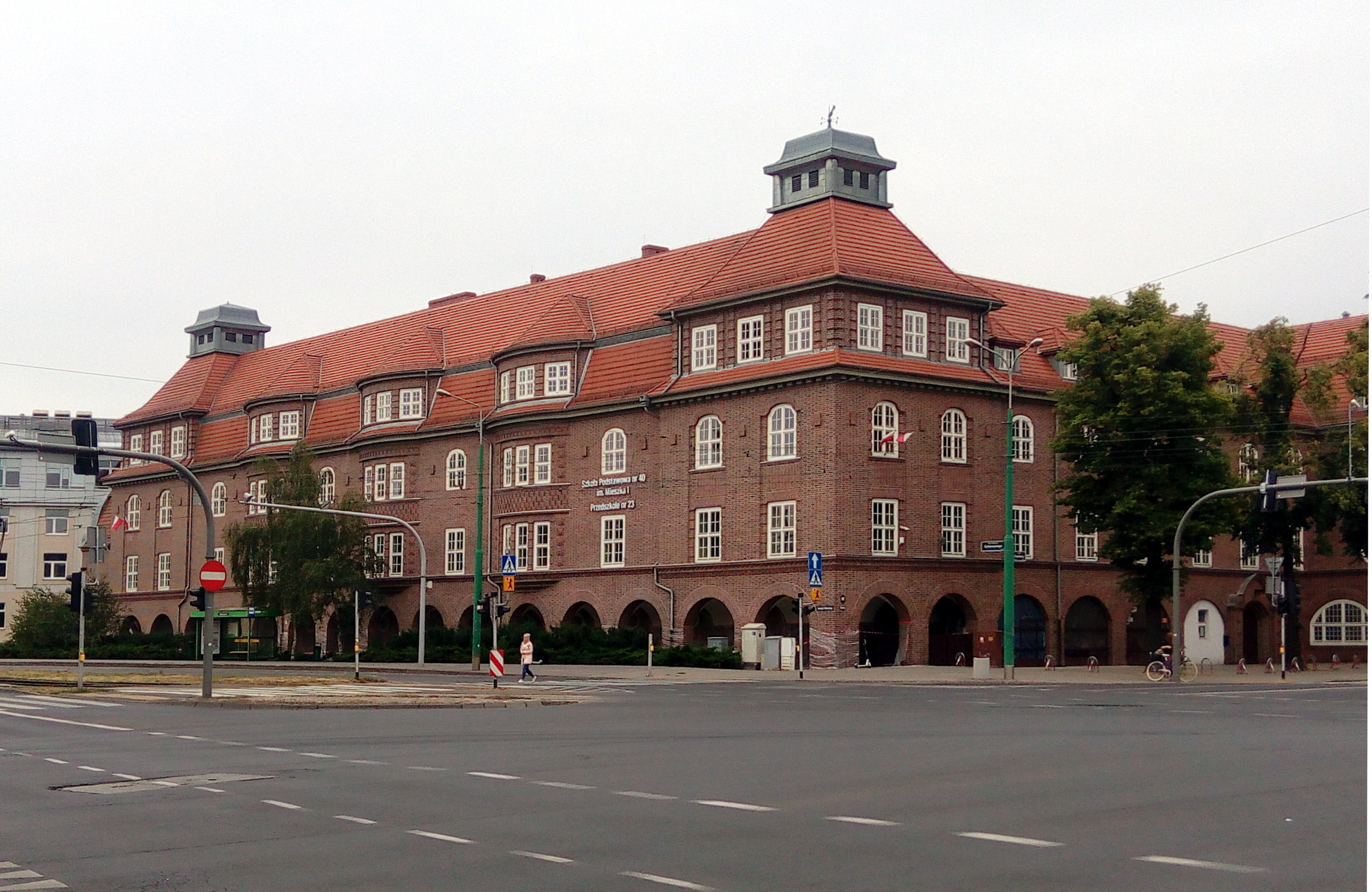
Primary School no. 40, Poznań, Poland

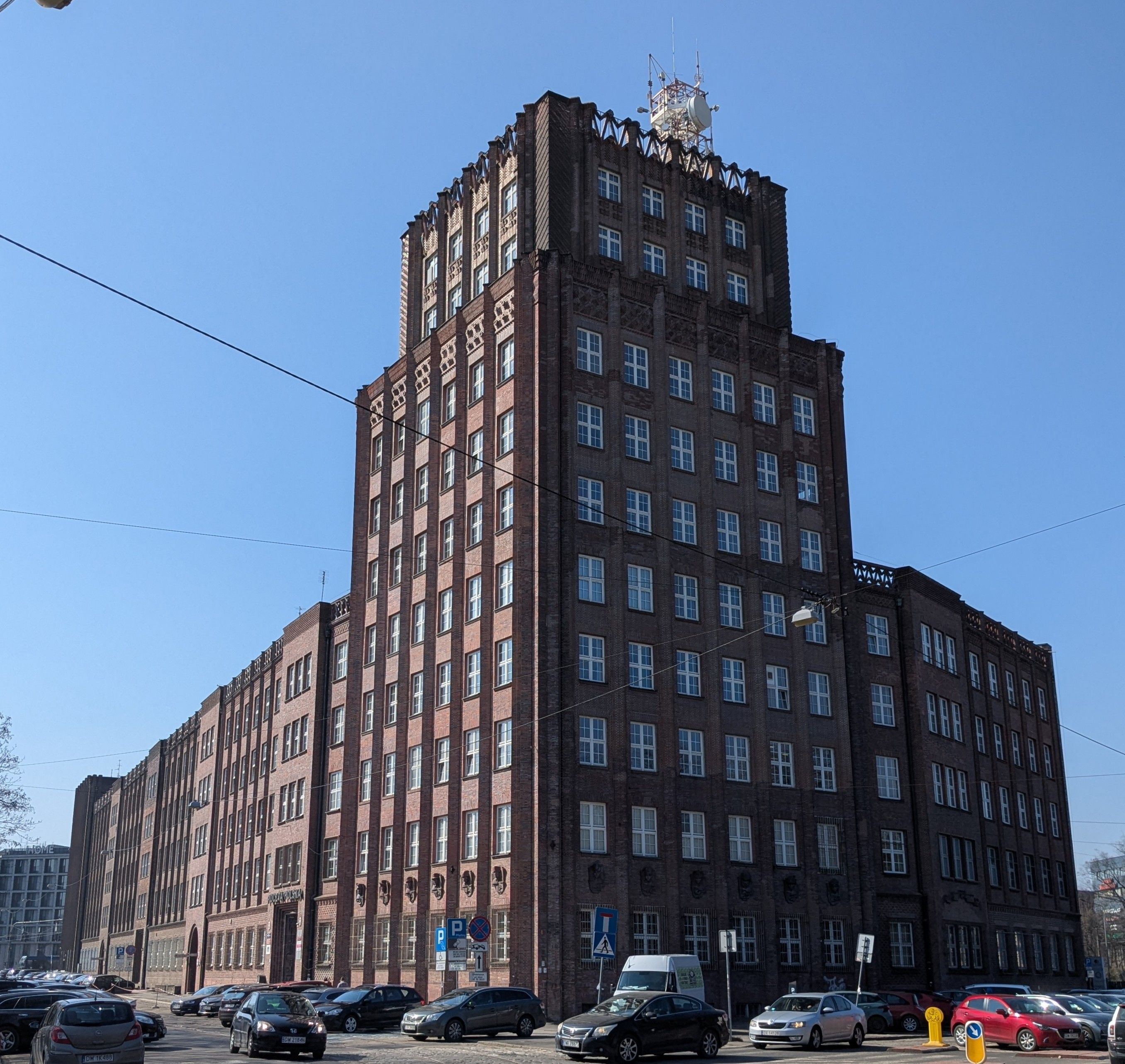
Main Post Office, Wrocław, Poland

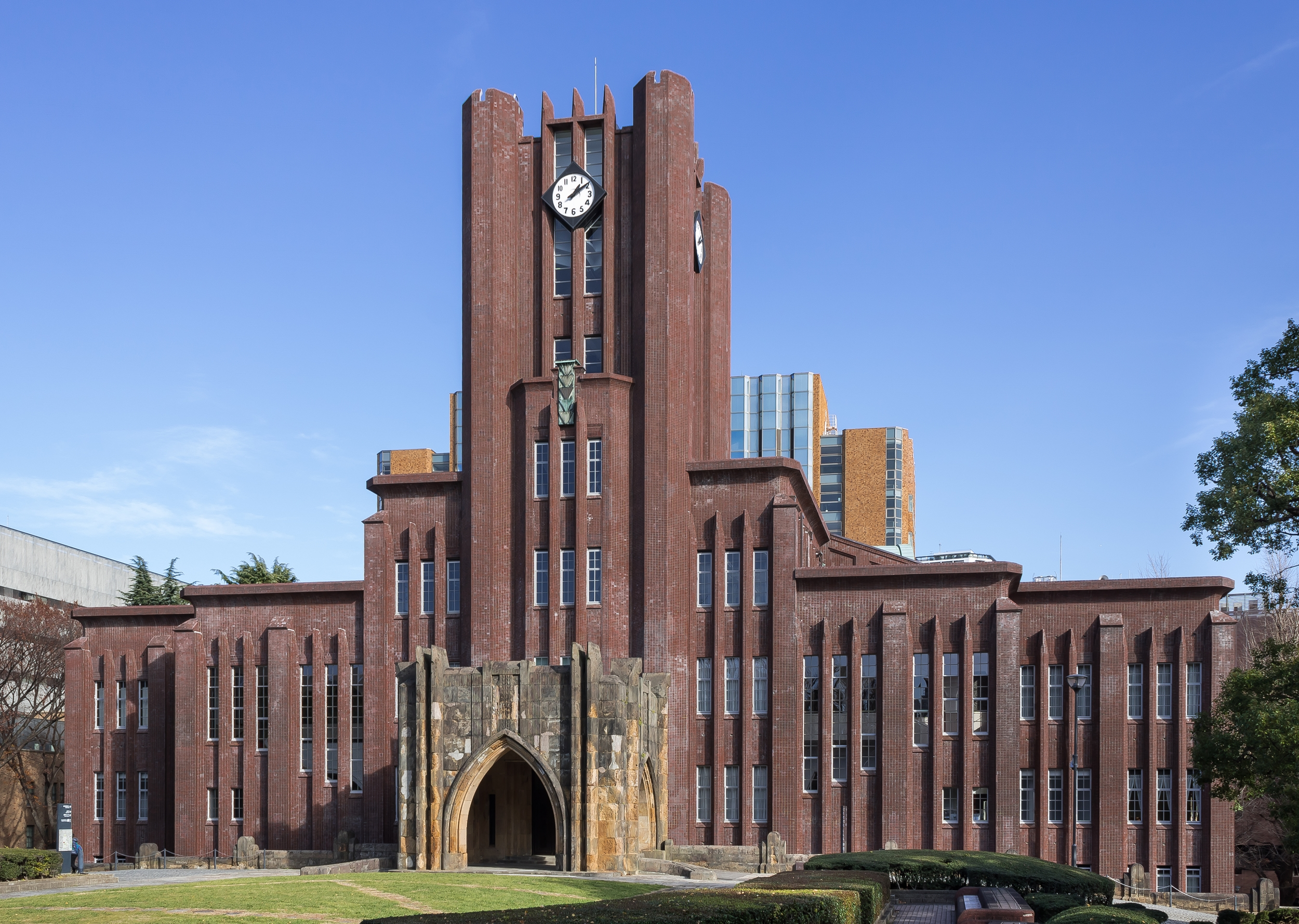
Yasuda Auditorium, Tokyo, Japan

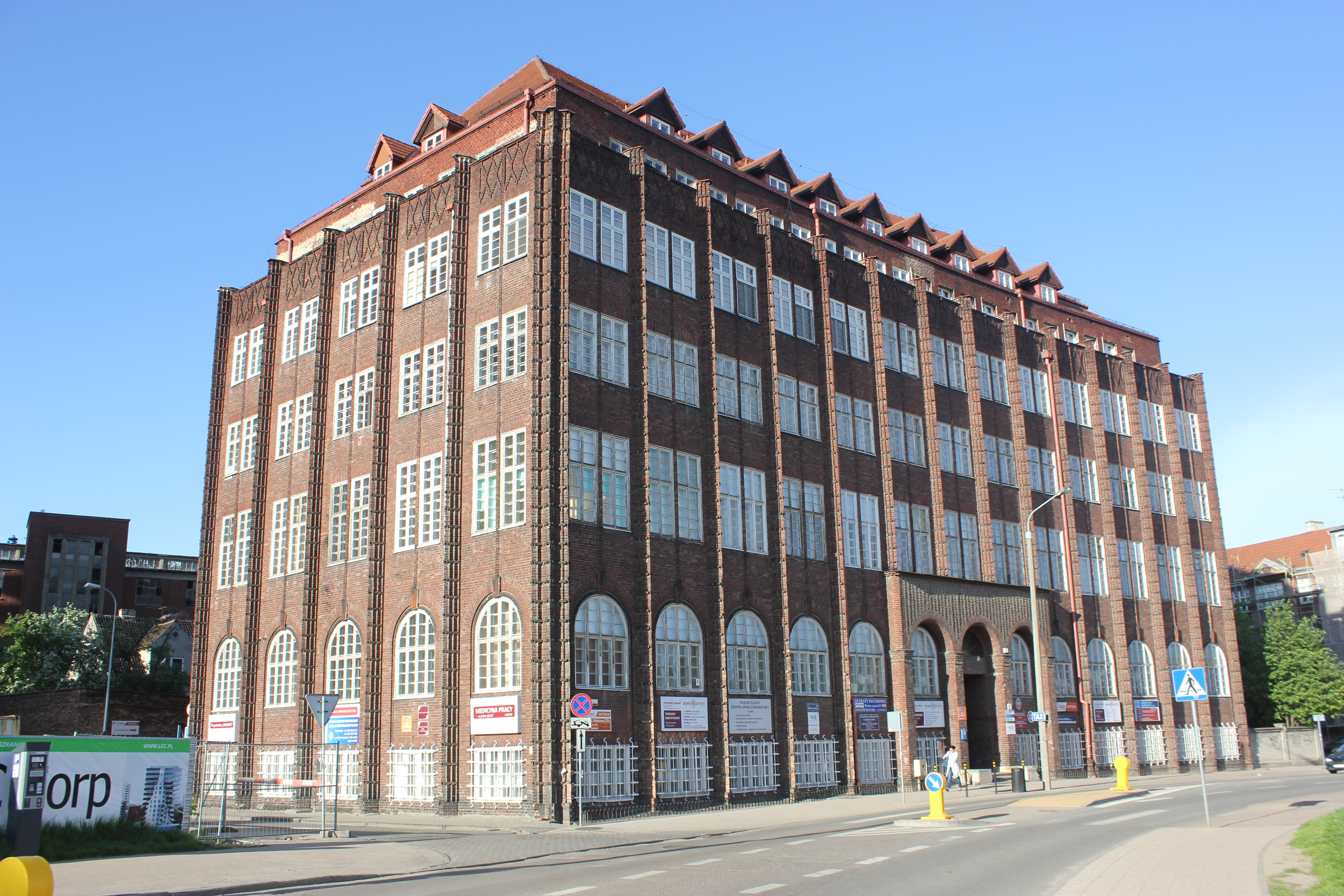
Health Fund Building, Gdańsk, Poland

== Notable architects ==
- Peter Behrens
- Dominikus Böhm (Cologne, Ruhr area, Swabia, Hesse)
- Martin Elsaesser (Southern Germany)
- Alfred Fischer (Essen, Ruhr area)
- Josef Franke (Gelsenkirchen, Ruhr area)
- Fritz Höger (Northern Germany and Hamburg, e.g. Chilehaus)
- Ossip Klarwein, chief designer (German: Hauptentwurfsarchitekt) with Höger's architecture firm (Northern Germany, Hamburg, e.g. Wichernkirche (destroyed in 1943), and Berlin, e.g. Kirche am Hohenzollernplatz)
- Michel de Klerk (Amsterdam)
- Wilhelm Kreis (Rhineland and Westphalia)
- Paul Mebes (Berlin, Eastern Germany)
- Hans Poelzig (Berlin, Breslau)
- Wilhelm Riphahn (Cologne)
- Fritz Schumacher (Hamburg)

== See also ==
- Brick Gothic
- Brick Renaissance

== Literature ==
- Rauhut, Christoph and Lehmann, Niels (2015): Fragments of Metropolis Berlin Hirmer Publishers 2015, ISBN 978-3777422909
- Backstein-Expressionismus, brochure by Gelsenkirchen City (Can be ordered free of charge) (in German)
