= Pärnu maantee 36 // Roosikrantsi 23 =

Building in Tallinn

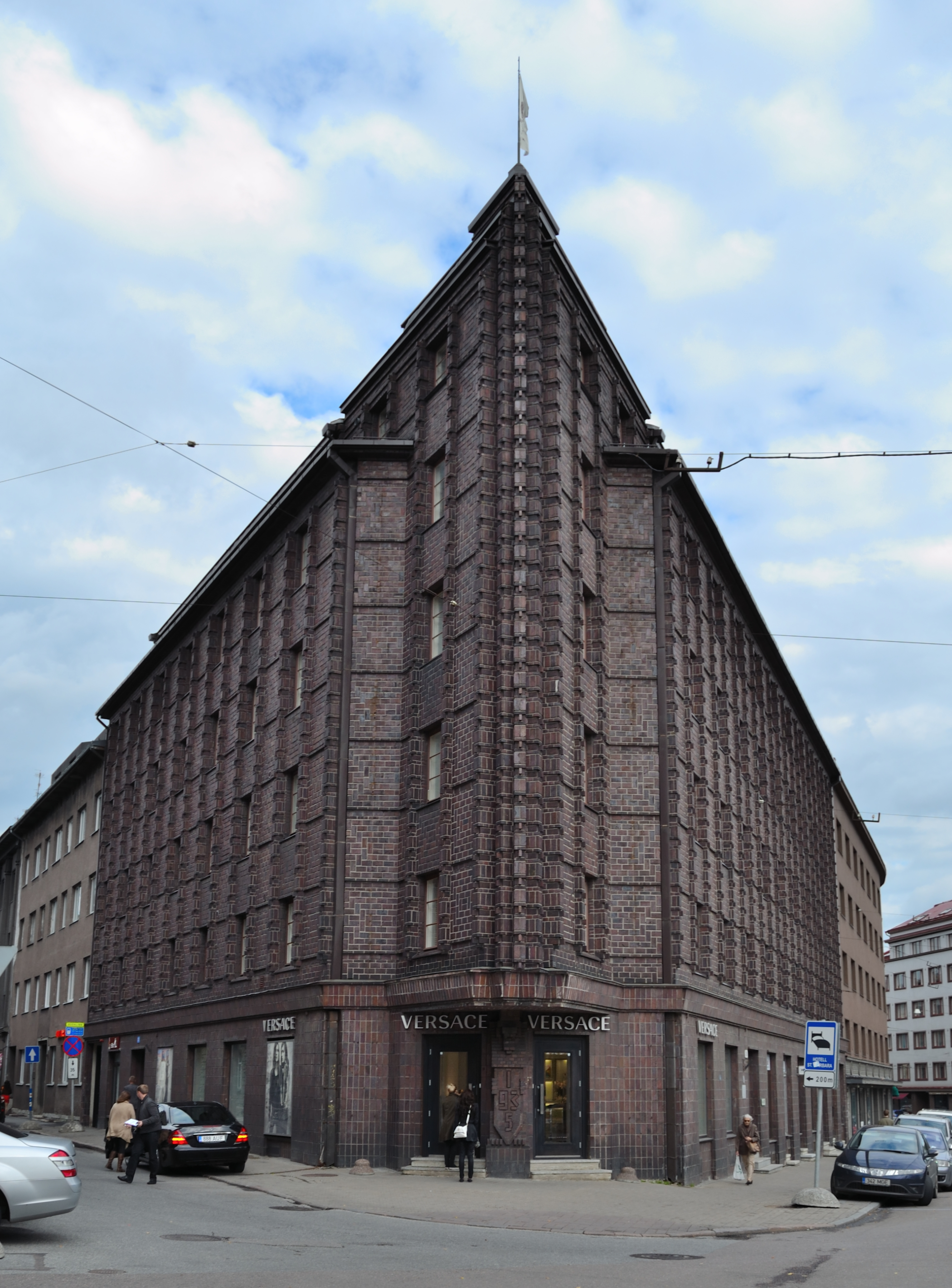
View from 2011 of the building on the sharp corner of Pärnu maantee and Roosikrantsi designed by architect Robert Natus and built in 1936.

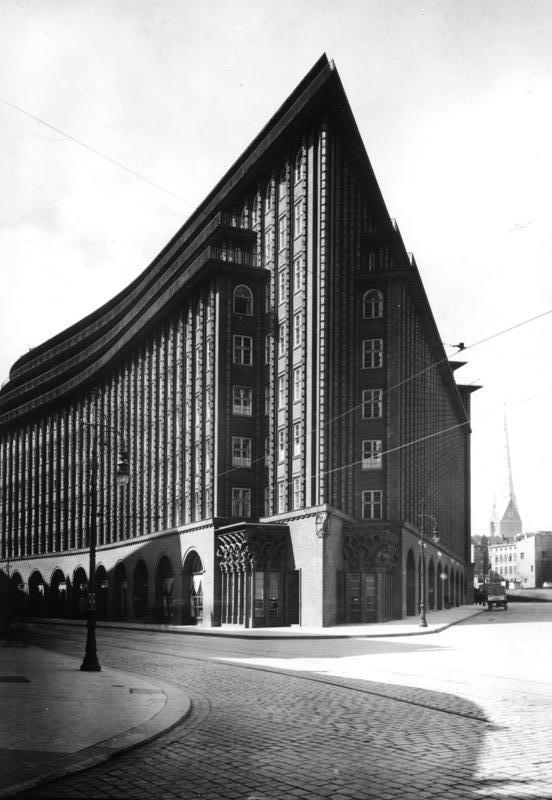
Robert Natus was inspired by the brick expressionist work of Fritz Höger in the Chilehaus in Hamburg of 1924.

Pärnu maantee 36 // Roosikrantsi 23 is a mixed-use commercial and residential building in Tallinn, Estonia, on the sharp corner of the streets Pärnu maantee and Roosikrantsi, designed by Baltic German architect Robert Natus and built between 1935 and 1936. The building has been a listed national monument since 1997.

== Choice of Brick Expressionist style ==
The facade of the building is made of clinker bricks, which is why the building is sometimes also called a "Clinker House" in other languages, like Estonian. Together with Natus' second clinker house on Vabaduse Square (now Tallinn City Hall), these two architectural works, originally designed for the same client, are the most direct expressions of expressionism in Estonian architecture, and Hamburg's Brick Expressionism in Germany is a direct ancestor of both. Natus' Baltic German heritage may have played a part in his interest in the Brick Expressionist architecture that was widely popular in northern Germany in the 1920s and '30s.

The sharp-edged plot in particular, but also the choice of materials, which proved very satisfactory with the client, the first clinker house, were the reasons why Fritz Höger's Chilehaus (1924), which is also located on a sharp-edged plot in Hamburg, was used as an example of an architectural solution.

According to architectural historian Mart Kalm, the Natus building in Tallinn could be described as Art Deco—supposedly "gentler" in style as opposed to Höger's Chilehaus' Expressionist aggression. This clinker brick building by Natus has been cited in the architectural literature as the most outstanding example of Art Deco architecture in Estonia.

== Building description ==
The residential building has five floors and its main plan is V-shaped due to the triangular plot. One wing of the building faces Roosikrantsi Street; the other faces Pärnu Maantee. Business premises are located on the ground floor of both wings. From the second floor there are 2- to 4- room apartments. There are three spiral staircases in the building, spiral staircases being the custom at the time for such apartment houses.

== Expressionist corner design ==
The primary notable feature of the house is its expressive appearance, which is achieved with a patterned clinker brick masonry and symmetrical composition. The articulation of the building's two symmetrical façades is achieved similarly to the Chilehaus. The main accent is the corner resolution with a pointed decorative tower, which establishes the building's dominant presence at the junction of two representative streets. The gradual accumulation of volumes on the street corner was a decorative design that was characteristic of Brick Expressionism.

The sculptural details that have become characteristic of Brick Expressionism are also missing from this clinker house. In the corner of the house, between the shops, there is a lion clinker figure rising on its hind legs, which holds the coat of arms with the year of construction "1935".
