= Ossip Klarwein =

German architect

Ossip (Yosef) Klarwein
- יוסף קלארווין
- Born: Ossip Klarwein; 6 February 1893; Warsaw, Russian Poland
- Died: 9 September 1970 (aged 77); Jerusalem, Israel
- Occupation: Architect
- Children: Mati Klarwein

Ossip (Yosef) Klarwein (Hebrew: יוסף קלארווין; 6 February 1893 – 9 September 1970) was a Polish-born German-Israeli architect who designed many works in Germany and Israel. Between 1921 and 1933 he was employed with Johann Friedrich Höger and became chief design architect. Klarwein was an important representative of Northern German Brick Expressionism and of modern architecture in Israel.

== Life ==
=== Germany ===
Klarwein was born in Warsaw, Poland. As Jews, the family immigrated to Germany because of the anti-Semitism growing in Poland and Russia after the failed revolution of 1905 in the Russian Empire. Klarwein studied architecture at the Technical University of Munich from 1917 to 1919, but he was not awarded a university degree. In 1920, he studied with Hans Poelzig in the master's studio for architecture of the Prussian Academy of Arts in Berlin. In 1921, Klarwein joined the architectural firm of Fritz Höger in Hamburg. Höger's office grew considerably in these years with increasing work orders, requiring additional personnel. Klarwein's designs were at the time published under Höger's name. Höger said that Klarwein was "one of the very best" employees. Between 1930 and 1933 Klarwein supervised the construction of the brick expressionist Church at Hohenzollernplatz following his designs in Berlin.

=== Mandatory Palestine / Israel ===
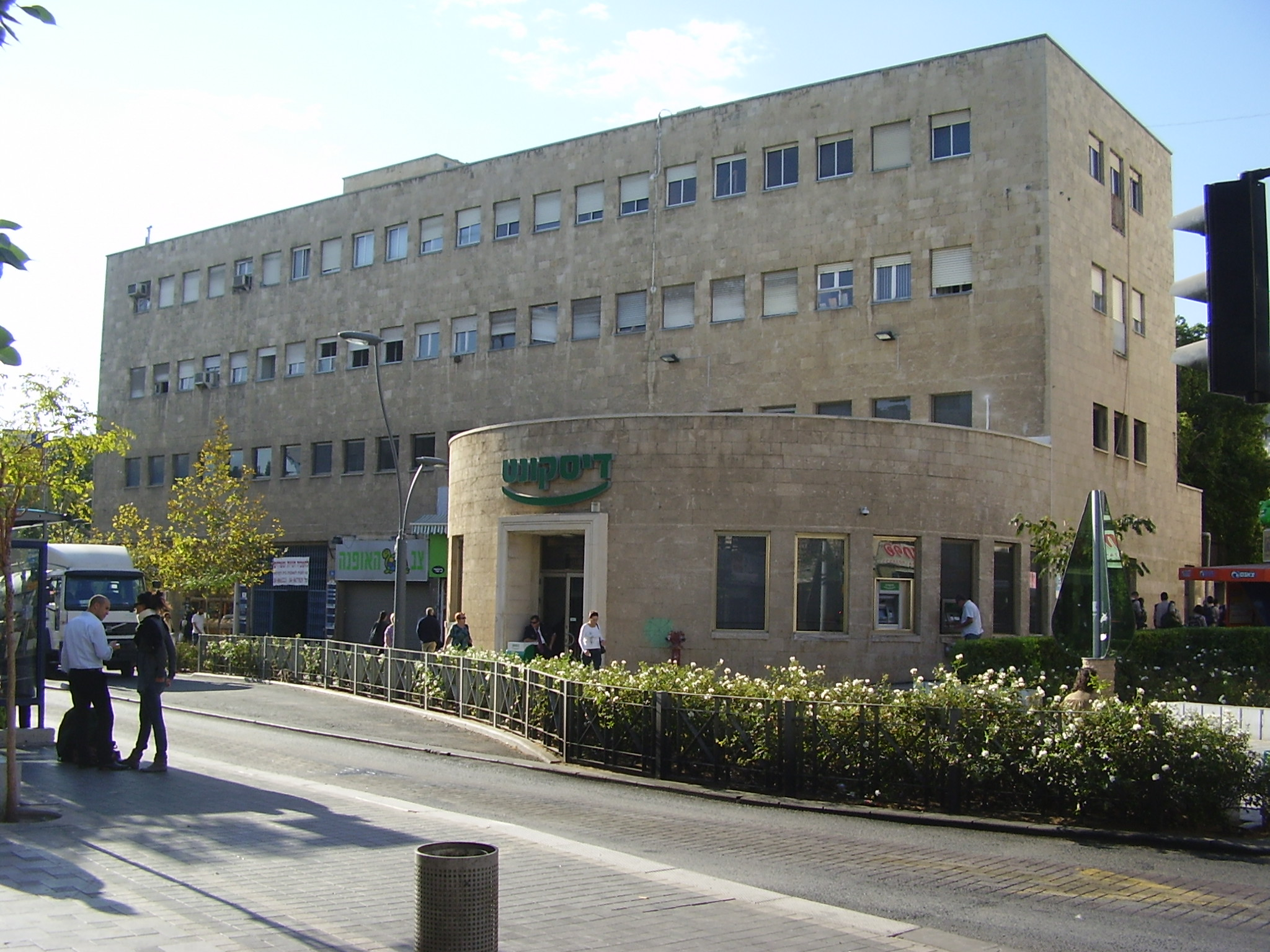
Qranot House in Haifa by Klarwein (1935–1937)

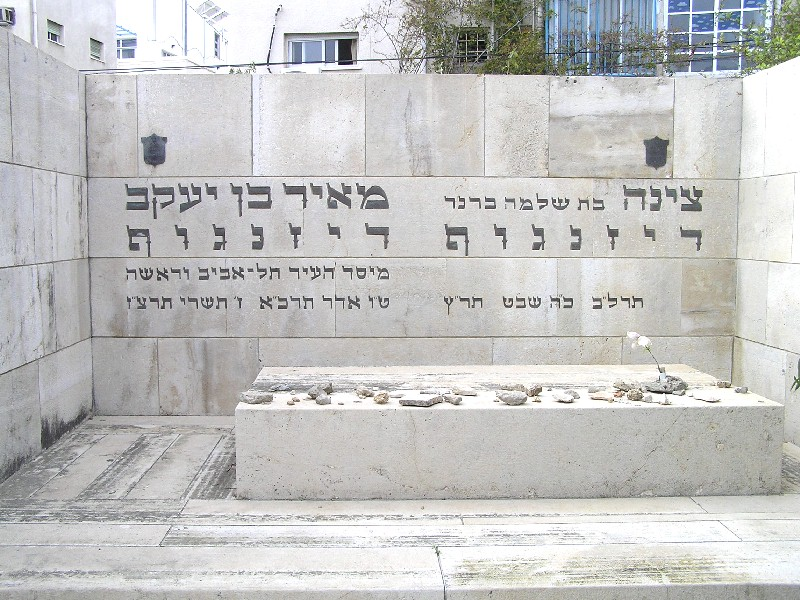
Zina Disengoff's tomb at Trumpeldor cemetery, Tel Aviv by Klarwein (1937)

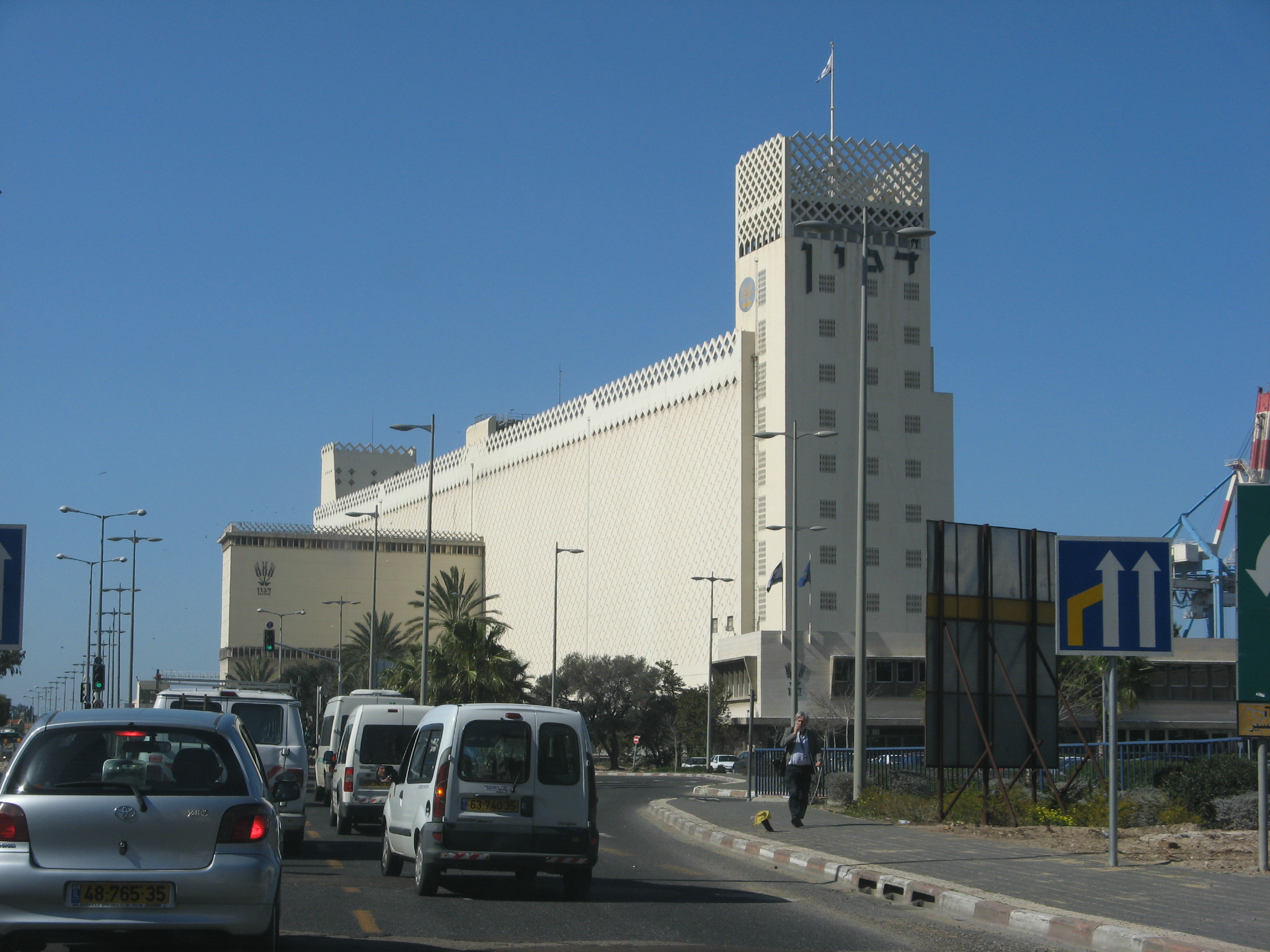
Dagon granaries in Haifa, originally designed by Klarwein (1953–1966)

In 1934, Klarwein emigrated with his non-Jewish wife Elsa (née Kühne), an opera singer, and their son Mati during the Fifth Aliyah to the British Mandate of Palestine, because they saw no future in Nazi Germany. Klarwein changed his first name from the Slavic name variant Ossip to the Hebrew form Yosseph. In Haifa, Klarwein became an independent architect.

Most of his works are public and commercial buildings, as well as development plans for cities and neighborhoods scattered throughout Israel. Klarwein's original design for the Knesset building unanimously won the 1957 architecture competition, and he continued to work on the project until completion, but some modifications were made to the plans. He designed with Richard Kauffmann and Heinz Rau, the campus of the Hebrew University.

== Works ==
- Church at Hohenzollernplatz, Berlin (1931–1933)
- Wichernkirche, Hamm, Hamburg (1933–1934)
- Qranot House, Hadar HaCarmel, Haifa (1936)
- Zina Dizengoff's tomb, Trumpeldor cemetery, Tel Aviv (1937)
- Shaul Tchernichovsky's tomb, Trumpeldor cemetery, Tel Aviv (1945)
- Kiryat HaMemshala (Government complex), Jerusalem, with Richard Kauffmann and Heinz Rau (1950)
- Mount Herzl and Theodor Herzl's tomb, Jerusalem (1951)
- Hebrew University of Jerusalem, Givat Ram campus master plan (1953)
- Dagon granaries, Haifa (1953–1966)
- The Knesset, Jerusalem (1956–1966) together with Shimon Powsner, Dov Karmi, Ram Karmi, Bill Gillitt, and Dora Gad (interior design)
- Israeli pavilion at the Brussels World's Fair (1958)
- Beit Zvi, Ramat Gan
- Tel Aviv Savidor Central railway station, Tel Aviv
- The old Jerusalem central bus station, Jerusalem (demolished)
