= Robert Natus =

Estonian architect

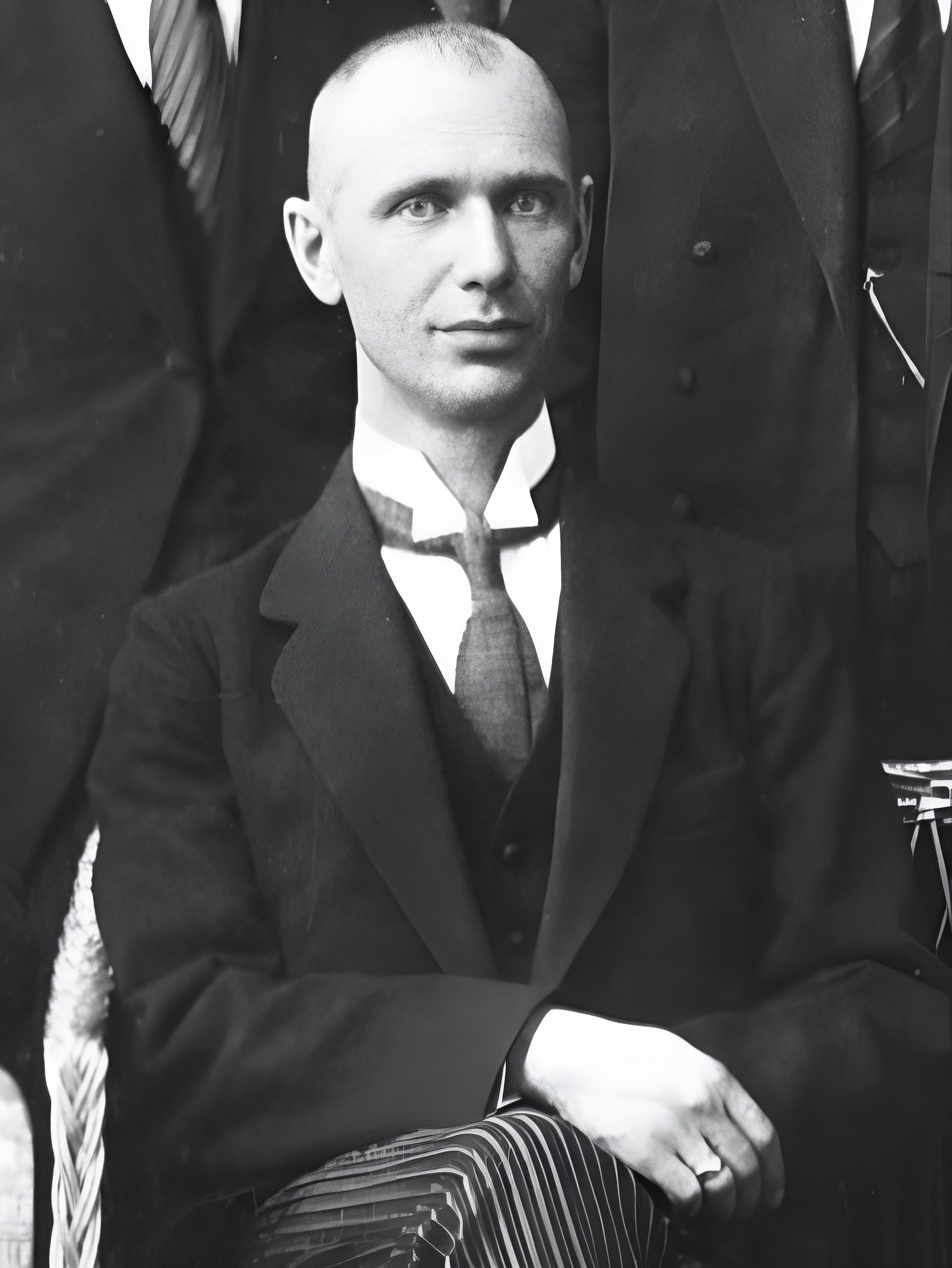
AI-upscaled image of Robert Natus (1924)

Robert Natus (16 March 1890 – 31 March 1950) was an Estonian architect of Baltic German descent.

Born in Viljandi, Estonia, Natus studied in Tallinn, and at Riga Technical University. In the 1920s, together with Ernst Gustav Kühnert, he drew the general plans for the garden cities of Merivälja and Nõmme, both just outside Tallinn (Nõmme was merged into Tallinn in 1940). His best known work is the current City Hall of Tallinn, built in 1932. With its red clinker mosaique façade and lanterns by the Estonian sculptor Jaan Koort, it is the most prominent building in Freedom Square, and the most notable example of expressionist art deco in Tallinn.

Red clinker mosaique was soon used on another of Natus' well known buildings, on the corner of Pärnu and Roosikrantsi street, only a few hundred meters from the City Hall. This building was inspired by Johann Friedrich Höger's Chilehaus in Hamburg.

Natus also created several functionalistic apartment buildings and private dwellings.

In 1939, Natus moved to Germany, later dying in Bad Wilsnack, Germany.

== Gallery ==
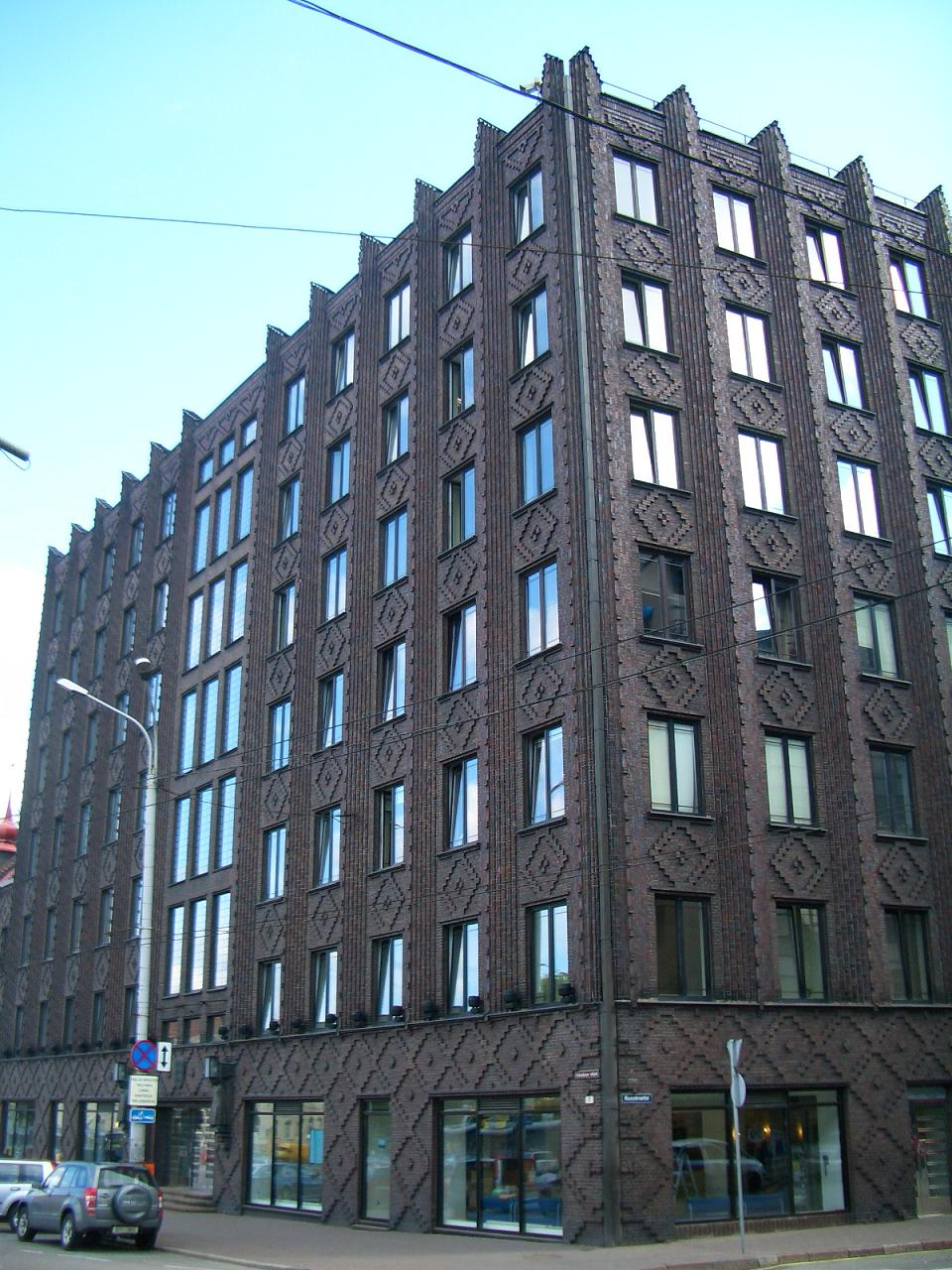
Tallinn City Hall, from 1932.

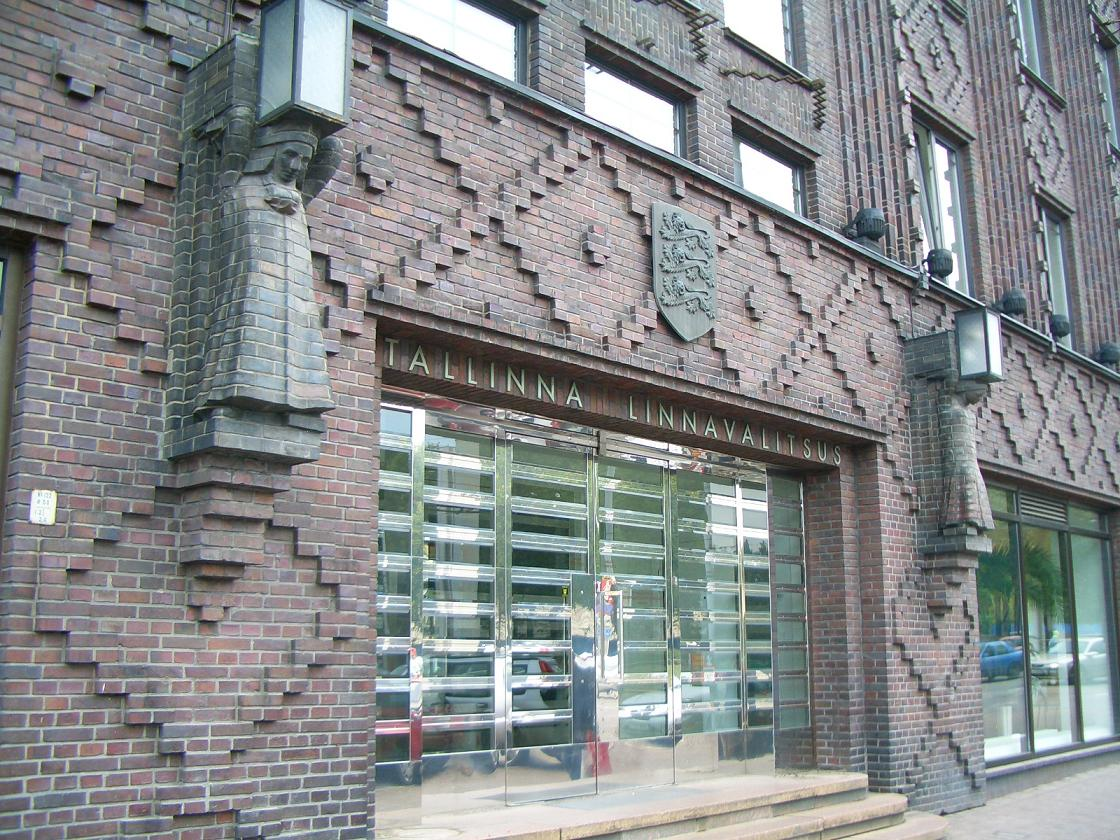
The main entrance of the City Hall.

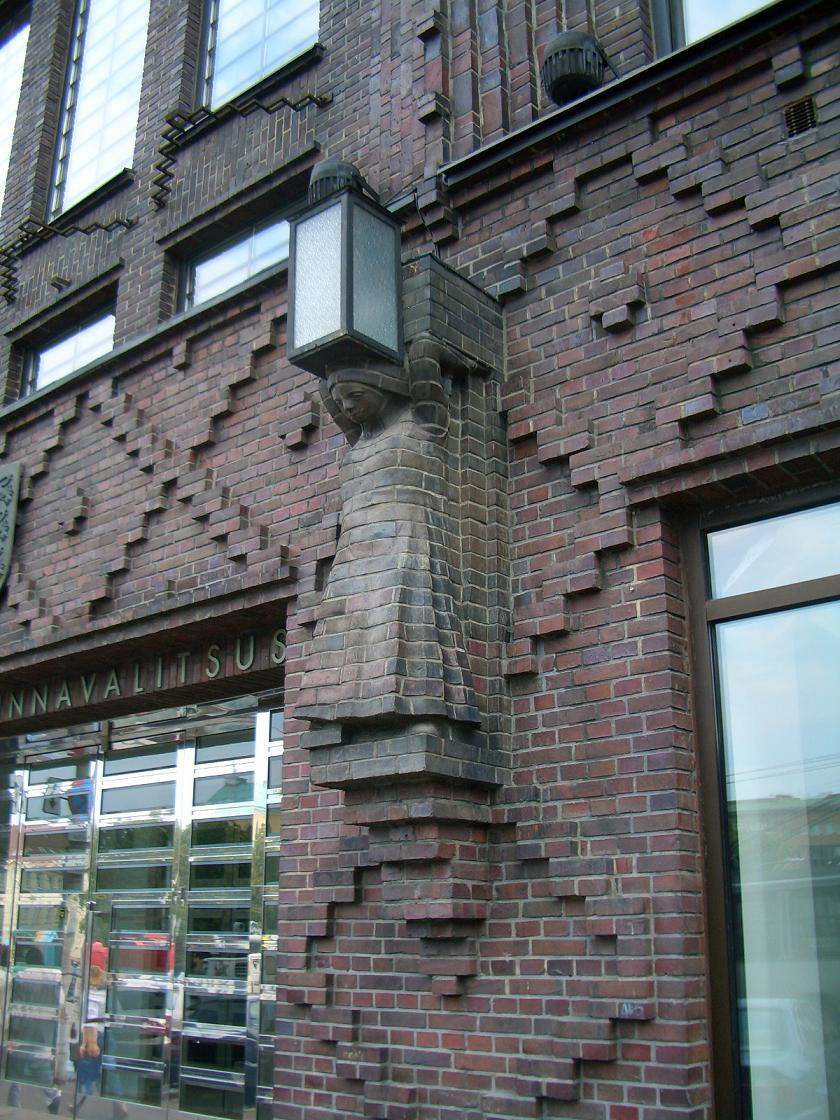
One of the two lantern holders by the sculptor Jaan Koort.

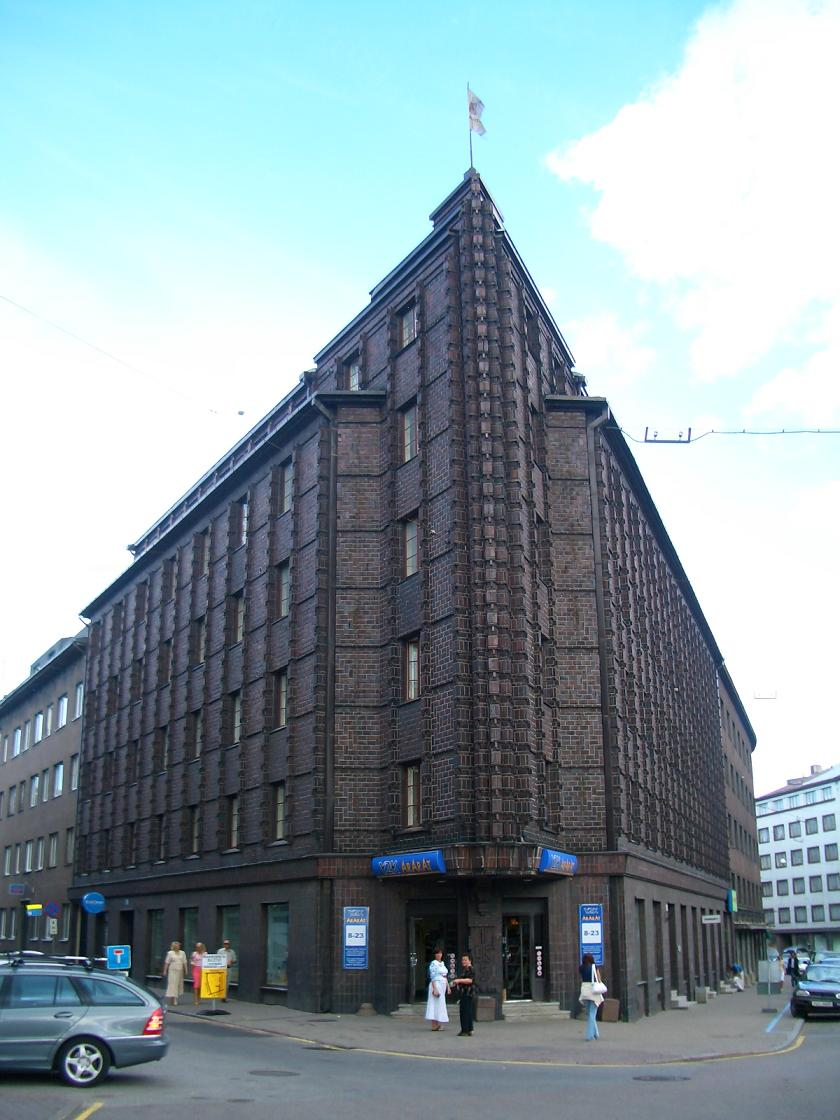
Pärnu maantee 36 // Roosikrantsi 23, built in 1935.

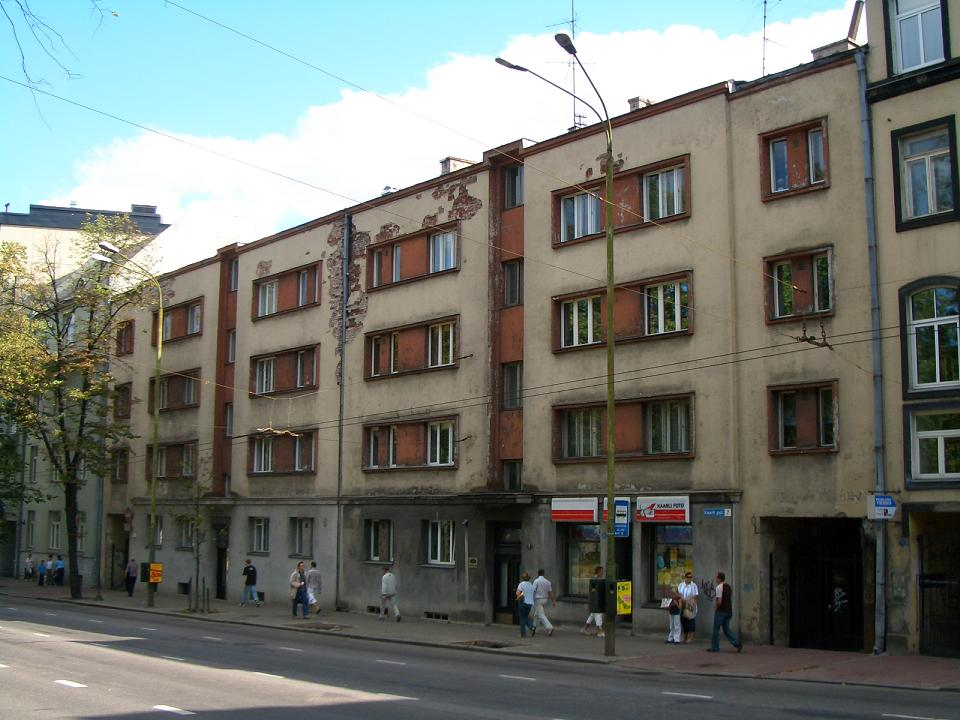
Apartment houses on Kaarli avenue, built in 1933.

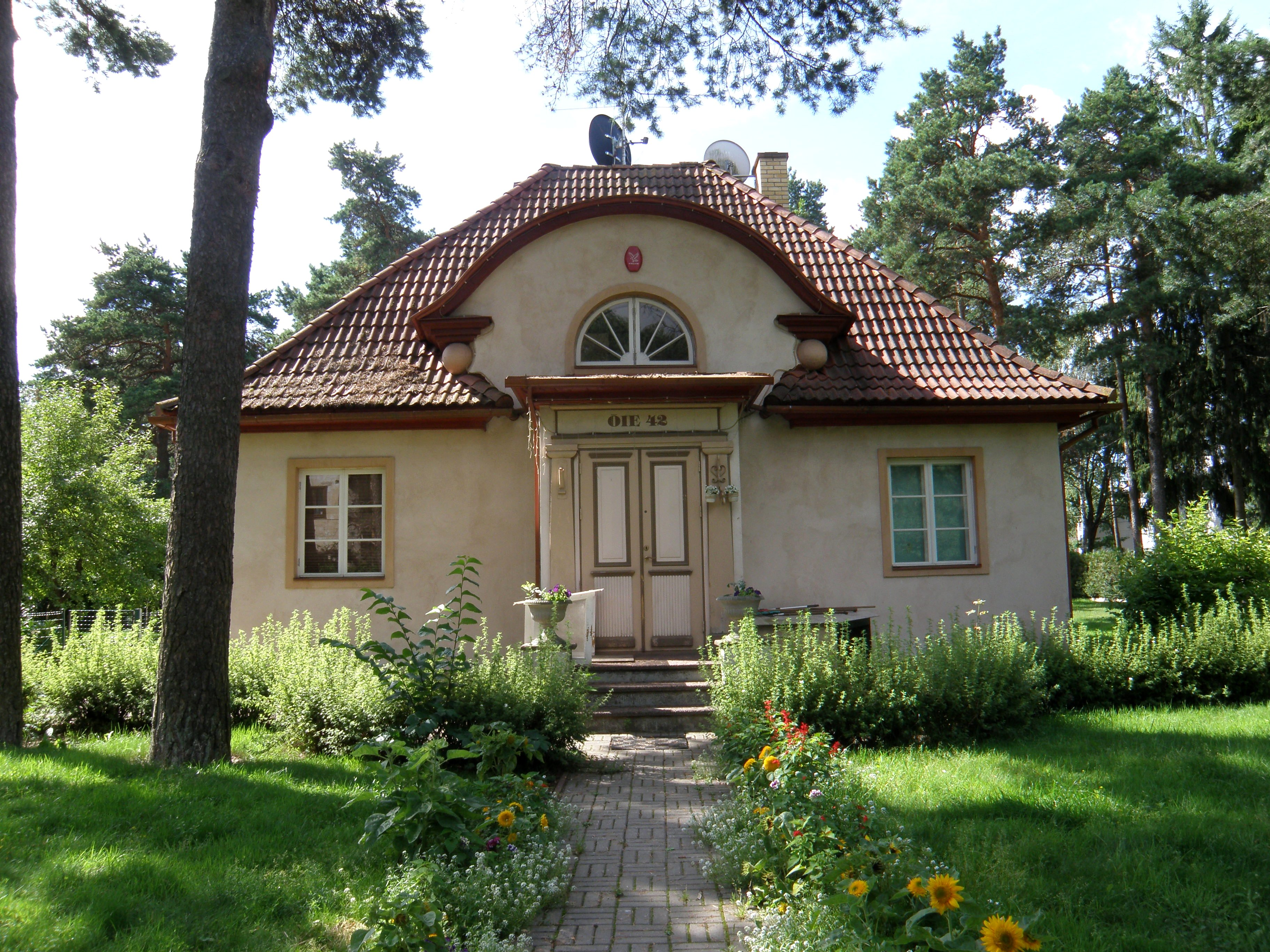
Private residence in Nõmme, built 1920s.

== See also ==
- List of Baltic German architects
