= Ernst Gustav Kühnert =

Baltic German architect

- Born: 21 January 1885; Tallinn, Governorate of Estonia, Russian Empire
- Died: 14 September 1961 (aged 76); Lübeck, West Germany
- Education: Riga Technical University, Techniche Hochschule Dresden
- Occupation: Architect

Ernst Gustav Kühnert (21 January 1885, Tallinn – 14 September 1961, Lübeck) was a Baltic German architect and art historian in Estonia.

He studied at the Riga Technical University from 1902 to 1905 and at the Techniche Hochschule Dresden from 1906 to 1908. From 1910 to 1912 Kühnert worked at a private architecture bureau in Kiel, and during the periods of 1912–1914 and 1918–1944 in Tallinn. In 1945 he moved to Lübeck.

Kühnert's most active period as an architect was in the 1920s. Most important of all works – rebuilding and renovating several buildings in the historical Old Town of Tallinn. Many of these buildings are now valued as examples of heimat style and Art Nouveau mixed with Estonian traditional architecture. Most of the buildings designed by Kühnert are small-scale dwellings. His 1930s creation can be categorised as functionalism. He also drew the general plans for garden cities of Merivälja (1924–1925) and Nõmme (1926–1927) (both with Robert Natus).

== Gallery ==
A heimat style building (with Jacques Rosenbaum) on Süda street in Tallinn. The building is from 1913.

Pikk street 4/6/8 in Tallinn, built in 1920.

Süda street 2 in Tallinn, built in 1932.
