= Kirche am Hohenzollernplatz =

Church in Berlin-Wilmersdorf

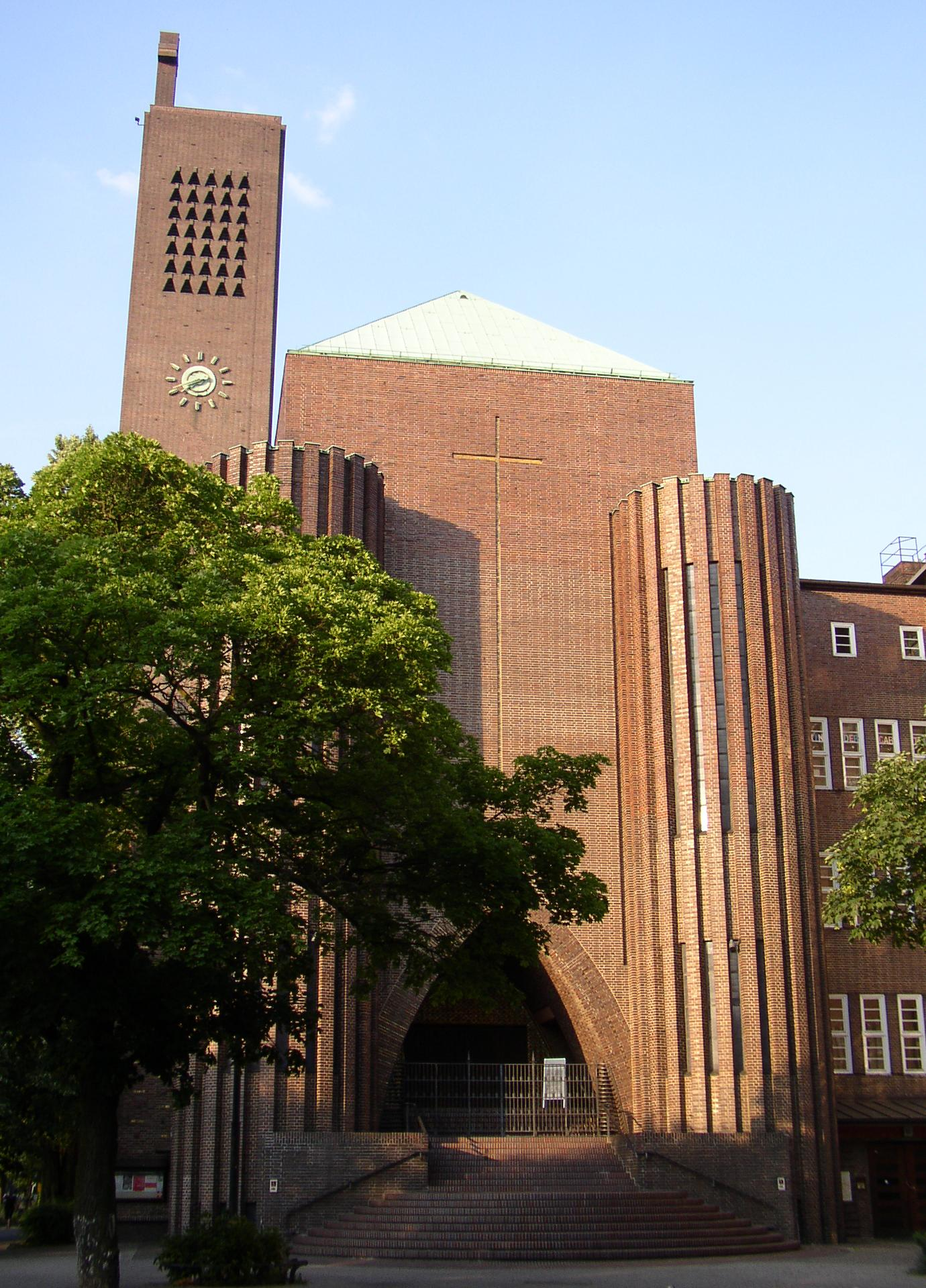
- The main entrance towards Hohenzollernplatz and the rectory built right adjacent to the church.

Religion
- Affiliation: United Protestant
- District: Sprengel Berlin (region), Kirchenkreis Wilmersdorf (deanery)
- Province: Evangelical Church of Berlin-Brandenburg-Silesian Upper Lusatia

Location
- Location: Wilmersdorf, a locality of Berlin
- Interactive map of Kirche am Hohenzollernplatz
- Coordinates: 52°29′39″N 13°19′37″E

Architecture
- Architect: Ossip Klarwein with Fritz Höger
- Style: Brick Expressionism
- Completed: 1933. Destroyed 1943. Ongoing reconstruction until 1965

Specifications
- Spire height: 66 meters
- Materials: clinker brick

Kirche am Hohenzollernplatz (Church at Hohenzollernplatz) is the church of the Evangelical Congregation at Hohenzollernplatz, a member of today's Protestant umbrella Evangelical Church of Berlin-Brandenburg-Silesian Upper Lusatia. The church is located on the eastern side of Hohenzollernplatz in the locality of Wilmersdorf, in the Berlin borough of Charlottenburg-Wilmersdorf. The building is considered a leading example of Brick Expressionism and a testimonial to the unique quality of expressionist church architecture in Berlin. The naming of the church after the city square it faces was originally considered a temporary solution until a more suitable one was chosen. The name stuck however, though the debate continues.

== Church and architect ==
Due to a high number of new parishioners moving in to the parish during the first decades of the 20th century, the existing three churches of Auenkirche, High Master Church, and Church of the Cross, were insufficient to contain the expanding Evangelical Wilmersdorf Congregation (German: Ev. Kirchengemeinde Berlin-Wilmersdorf).

In 1927, this relatively affluent congregation, whose parish then comprised the locality of Wilmersdorf, chose to build an additional church in the north of its district. The congregation tendered a competition and the architecture firms of Otto Bartning, Hellmuth Grisebach, Fritz Höger, Otto Kuhlmann (in German), Leo Lottermoser and Hans Rottmayr submitted their projects.

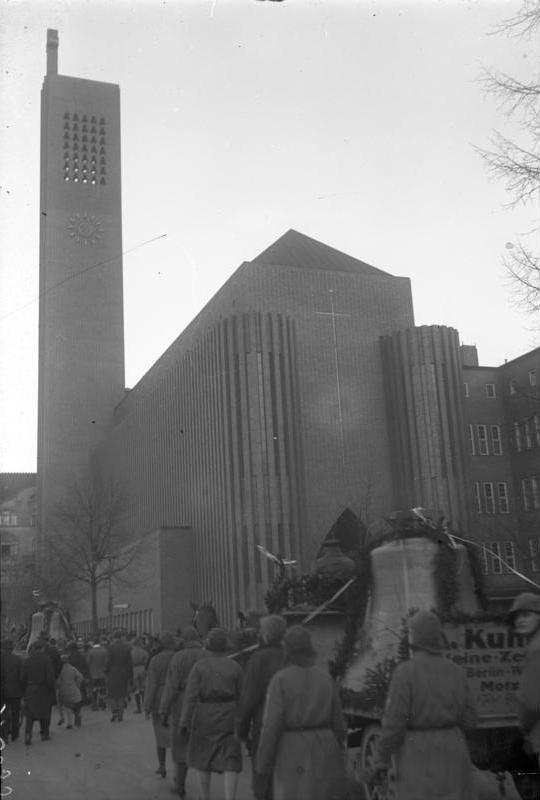
Bringing in the bells to the spire, accompanied by girls (traditionally virgins) in February 1932

The Hamburg-based firm of Fritz Höger prevailed with their design by the architect Ossip Klarwein, with his initial concept altered in part by Höger. Though Klarwein was head designer (German: Hauptentwurfsarchitekt) in Höger's firm, according to his contract, all his designs were to be issued under Höger's name.

Klarwein relocated to Berlin shortly before building began, in order to personally supervise realization of the project, residing at Joachim-Friedrich-Straße No. 47. Construction lasted from 1930 to 1933. On 19 March 1933 the church was inaugurated. Soon after its completion, Klarwein, his wife and son Mati emigrated to Mandatory Palestine to escape the Nazi takeover of Germany (Machtergreifung).

== The design of the church ==
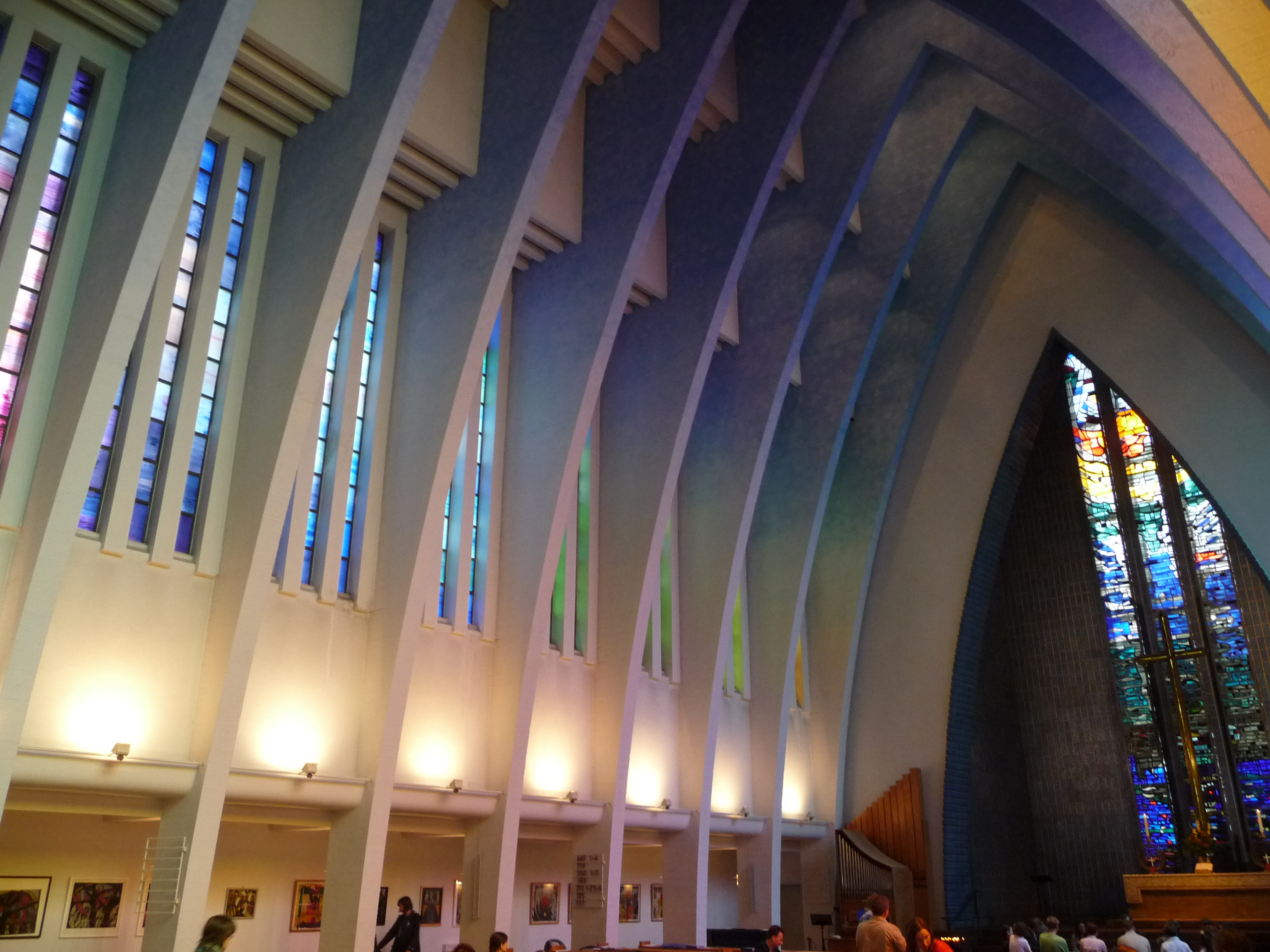
View to the northern windows and the quire

The unabashed modernism of the design was much debated prior to commencement of building work. The basic structure of the church is a concrete skeleton, clad by brick façades. The masonry of the facades is patterned in alternately raised and receded verticals along the building's sides, as well as the semi-cylindrical structures either side of the entrance, while evenly laid on the narrower east and west ends and bell tower, all done in clinker brick. Höger preferred that material. The hip roof's copper verdigris contrasts with the dark reddish brick. The slim, high bell tower became a landmark easily seen along much of Hohenzollerndamm thoroughfare and beyond.

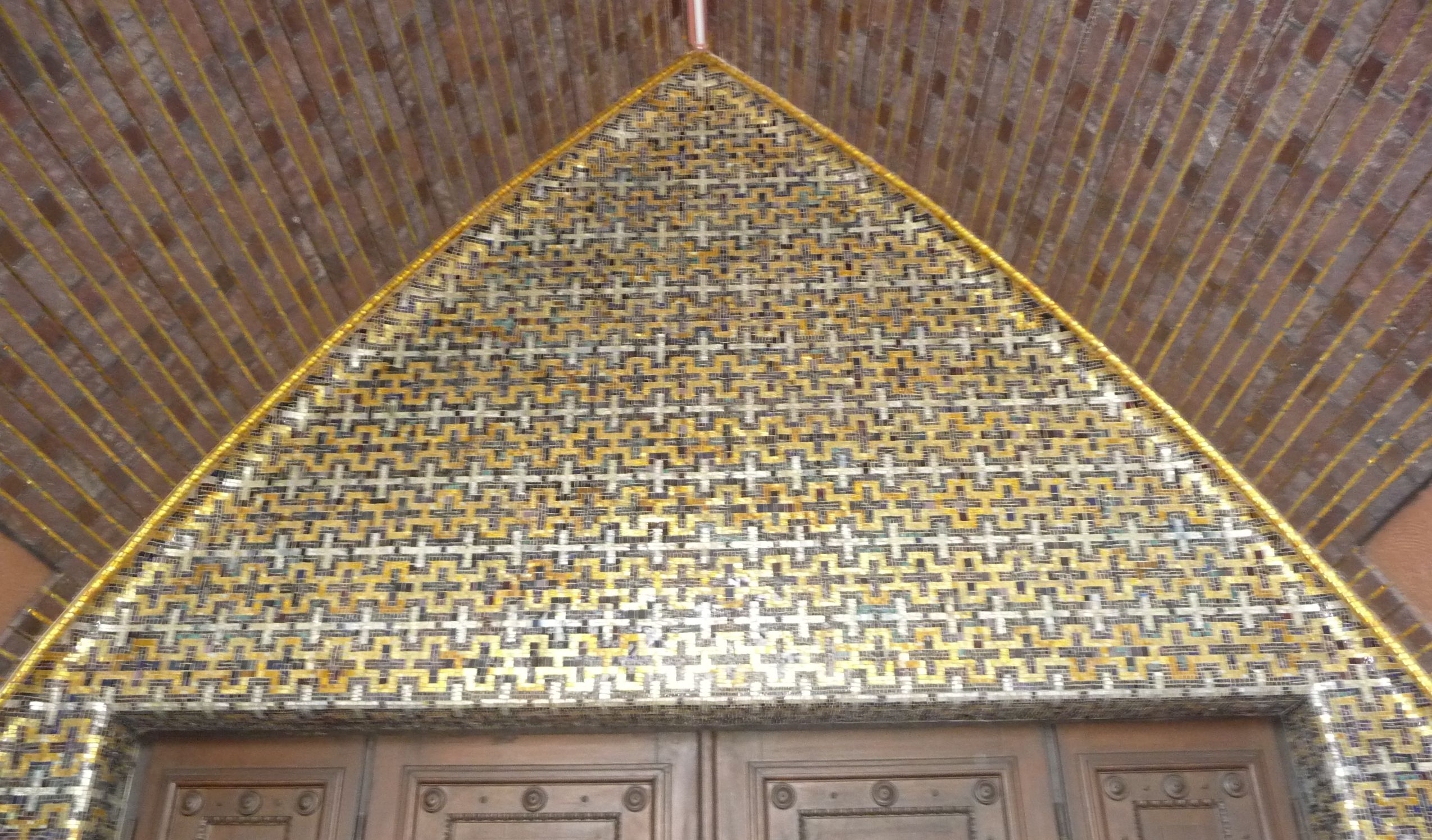
Decoration around the western main portal.

Inside, the actual main floor consisting of nave, aisles, choir and altar is elevated, above the ground-level floor housing a fellowship hall. The entrance at the building's western end is flanked on both sides by the cladding of two round staircases. The semicircular flights of stairs lead to the ogival main inner portal, which announces the dominant forms of the interior. The church's west-facing elevation, as a whole, provides an eye-catching flank to the eastern edge of Hohenzollernplatz.

The huge nave consists of 13 arched girders of ferroconcrete, which end as pilasters at the ground. Viewed from the western entrance, the girders give an impression to tapering towards the east. The pointed ogival arch of the girders grants the interior, despite its modernity, a sense of Gothic appeal, somewhat unusual for the rather sober Protestant church architecture of the time. This, combined with the building's sense of volume, earned the church the nickname Powerhouse of God (German: Kraftwerk Gottes).

The Allied bombing of Berlin in World War II inflicted severe damage on the church, and on 22 November 1943 it was gutted by fire. Following the war, reconstruction proceeded gradually until completed in 1965. From 1990-91, architect Gerhard Schlotter undertook a further renovation and rebuild, enabling its use as an exhibition space for contemporary art. Schlotter also restored the prayer hall to its original colours used before its destruction.

== Furnishings ==
The painter and art professor Hermann Sandkuhl (in German) created decorative sgraffiti displaying various figures, situated in the intermediate recessed spaces between the brick pilasters on the building's exterior. All were destroyed in the fire in 1943. The tympanon decoration by Erich Waske (in German) adorning the final, somewhat smaller, girder above the oriented quire, depicting the Sermon on the Mount and showing Jesus of Nazareth with a corona of light, was also lost in 1943. The prayer hall is illuminated by three long windows in the quire. The original windows were completely shattered during the bombing of the city. In 1962, Sigmund Hahn designed a new central quire window and during the course of the renovation of 1990/1991 Achim Freyer (in German) added colorful new windows to the left and right of the quire. Höger's original Baptismal font of clinker brick, adorned with gold paintings, survived the war intact. Regina Roskoden's abstract basalt sculpture of an angel, graphics by Max Pechstein and a painting of the crucifixion by Hermann Krauth are displayed in a by-room. Considerable offertories from parishioners enabled the purchase of a new organ of 60 registers, built by E. Kemper & Sohn and installed after 1965, which required the removal of the second western loft gallery of seats.

== Congregation today ==
On 1 April 1946 the northern section of the parish of the Wilmersdorf Congregation was constituted as today's Congregation at Hohenzollernplatz (German: Kirchengemeinde am Hohenzollernplatz), thus becoming the proprietor of the ruined church. Since 1987, the church also houses exhibitions of contemporary art, two of which take place annually. Art plays a significant role among the local congregation, to the extent that services frequently address art in their theme. In 1991, the organ builder Sauer reintonated the Kemper organ, which is regularly used in services as well as in concert performances. Since November 2008, each Saturday at 12.00 midday, the "NoonSong", a 30 minute-long liturgy sung by the professional vocal ensemble Sirventes Berlin, attracts hundreds of listeners.

== Trivia ==
The church is nicknamed "God's power station" ("Kraftwerk Gottes") by the Berlin inhabitants due to its appearance.
