= Chilehaus =

1924 office building in Hamburg, Germany

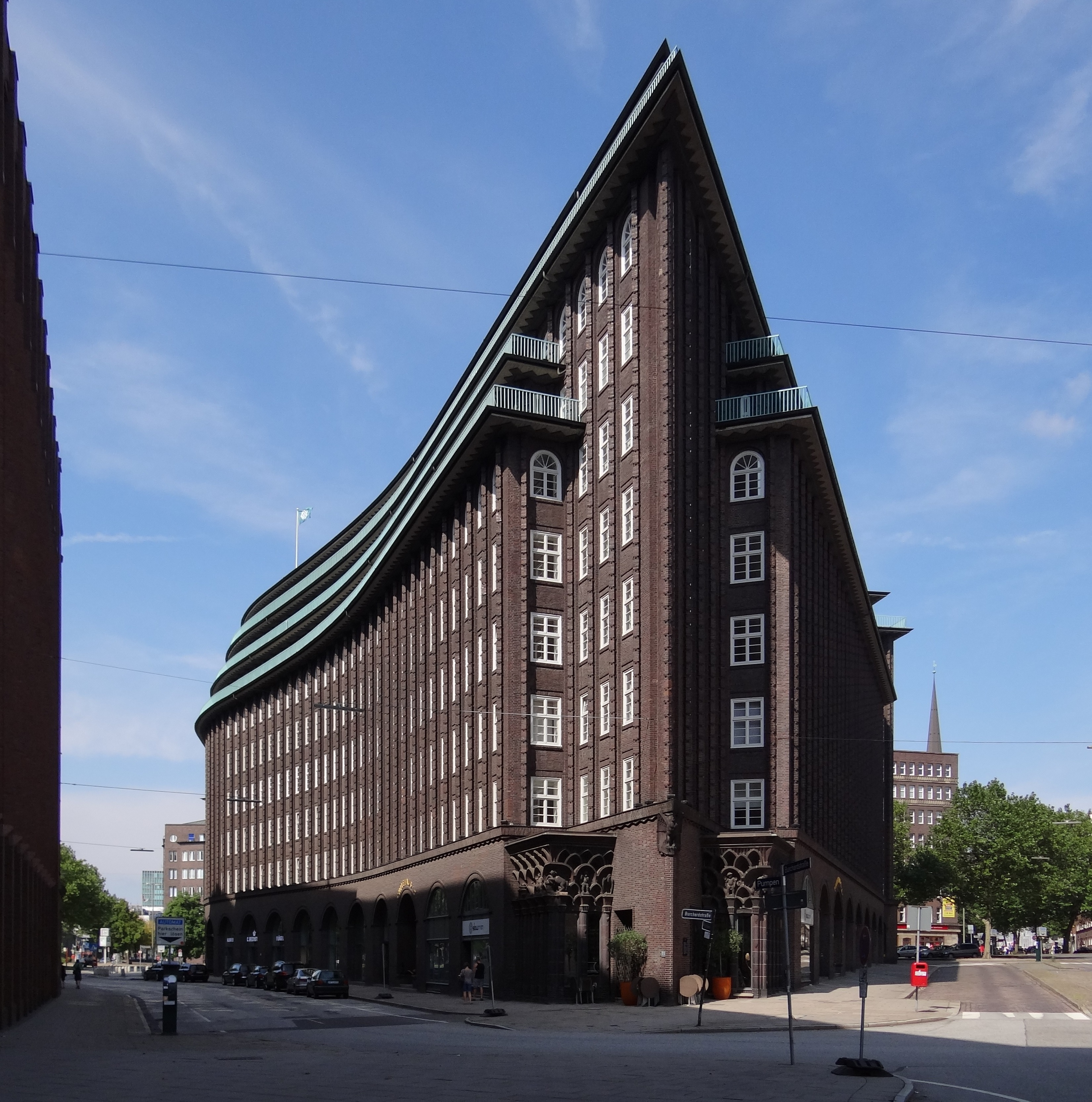
- Chilehaus in Hamburg by Fritz Höger

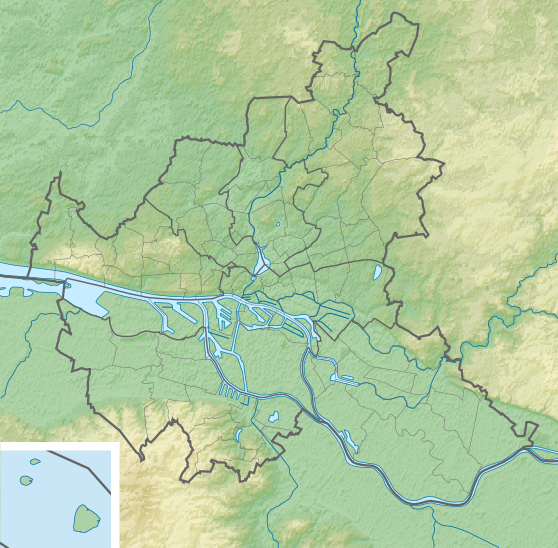
- Location within Germany Location within Hamburg

General information
- Type: Office building
- Architectural style: Brick Expressionism
- Location: Hamburg, Germany
- Coordinates: 53.5480°N 10.0016°E
- Construction started: 1921
- Completed: 1924
- Owner: Union Investment Real Estate AG

Technical details
- Floor count: 10

Design and construction
- Architect: Fritz Höger

UNESCO World Heritage Site
- Official name: Chilehaus
- Type: cultural
- Criteria: iv
- Designated: 2015
- Part of: Speicherstadt and Kontorhaus District with Chilehaus
- Reference no.: 1467

Chilehaus

The Chilehaus ([ˈt͡ʃiː.lə.haʊ̯s], "Chile House") is a ten-story office building in Hamburg, Germany in the Kontorhaus District. It is an example of the 1920s Brick Expressionism style of architecture. This large angular building is on a site of approximately 6,000 m^{2} (1.5 acres), spanning the Fischertwiete Street in Hamburg. It was designed by the German architect Fritz Höger and finished in 1924. As part of Kontorhaus District, it was inscribed as a UNESCO World Heritage Site in 2015.

== Design ==
The Chilehaus building is famed for its top, which is reminiscent of a ship's prow, and the facades, which meet at a very sharp angle at the corner of the Pumpen- and Niedernstrasse. The best view of the building is from the east. Because of the accentuated vertical elements and the recessed upper stories, as well as the curved facade on the Pumpenstraße, the building has, despite its enormous size, a touch of lightness.

The building has a reinforced concrete structure and has been built with the use of 4.8 million dark Oldenburg bricks. The building is constructed on very difficult terrain, so to gain stability it was necessary to build on 16-meter-deep reinforced-concrete pilings.

The location's close vicinity to the Elbe River necessitated a specially sealed cellar, and heating equipment was constructed in a caisson that can float within the building, so the equipment can't be damaged in the event of flooding.

The sculptural elements in the staircases and on the facade were provided by the sculptor Richard Kuöhl.

The building hosted 2 sets of paternoster lifts before being modernised in 1991.

== History ==
The Chilehaus building was designed by the architect Fritz Höger and built between 1922 and 1924. It was commissioned by the shipping magnate Henry B. Sloman, who made his fortune trading saltpeter from Chile, hence the name Chile House. The cost of construction is difficult to determine, as the Chile House was built during the period of hyperinflation that struck Germany during the early 1920s, but is estimated to have been more than 10 million reichsmark. Currently it is property of the German real-estate company Union Investment Real Estate AG. The language school Instituto Cervantes is one of the tenants.

== Gallery ==
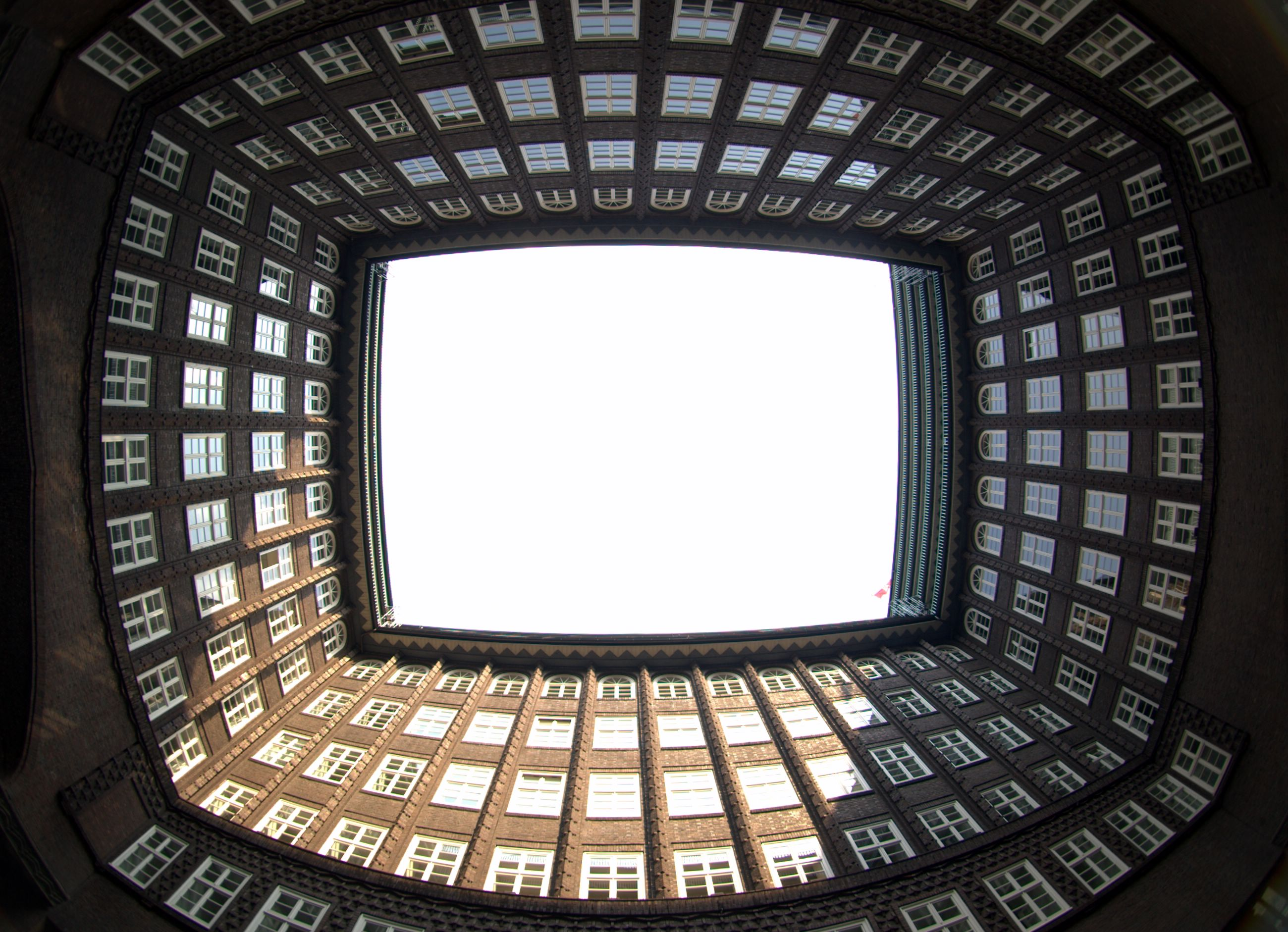
Chilehaus: Inner courtyard

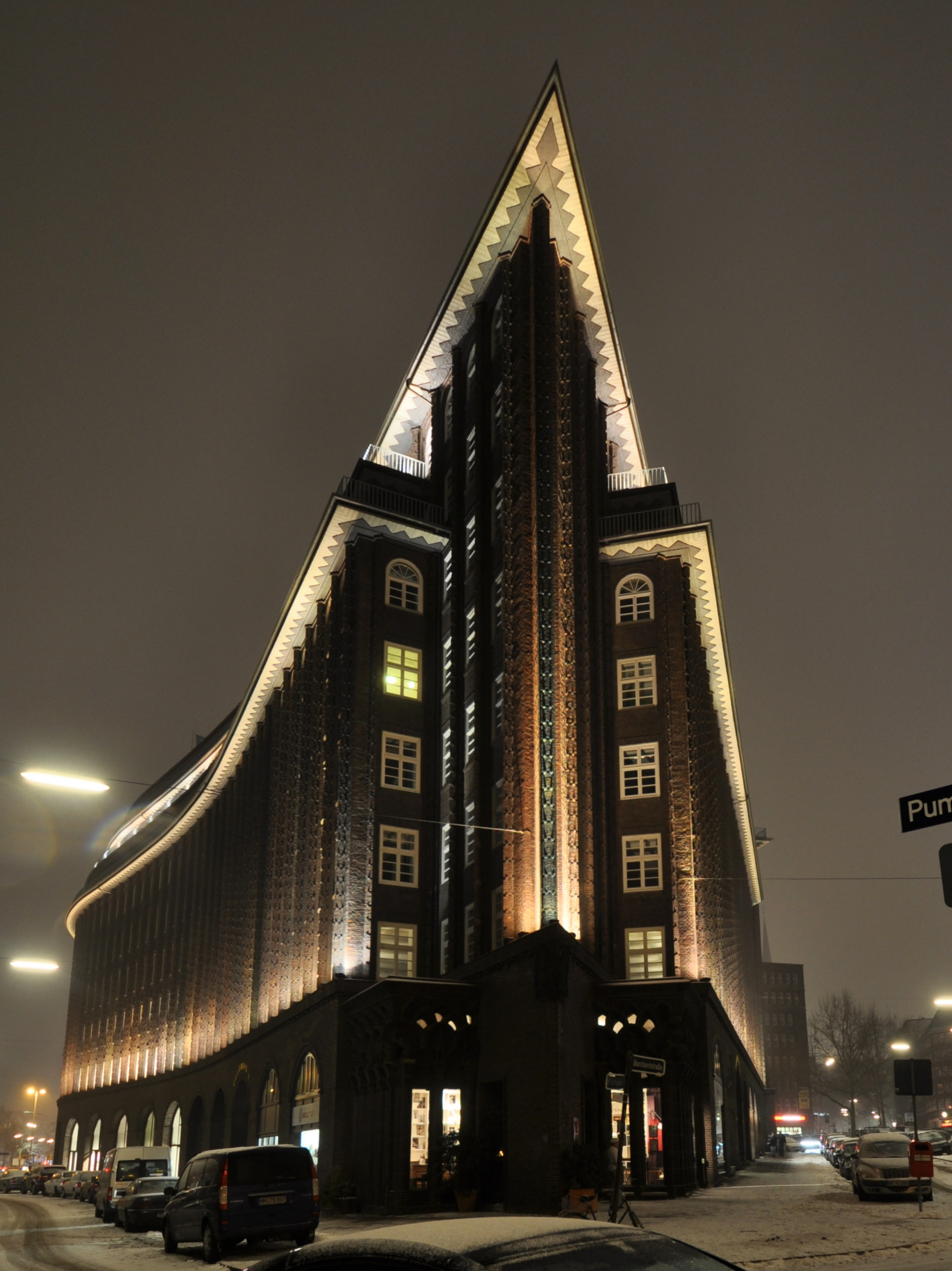
Chilehaus at night

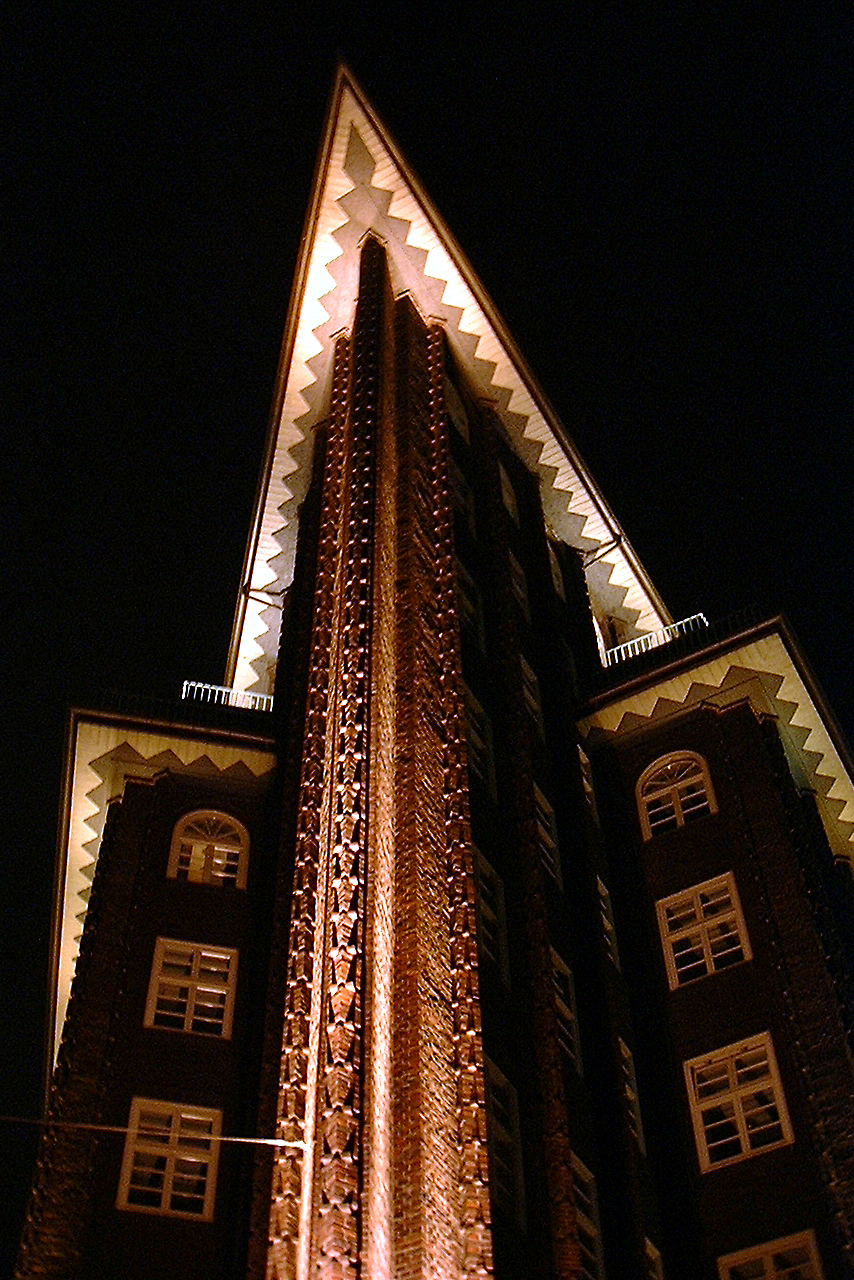

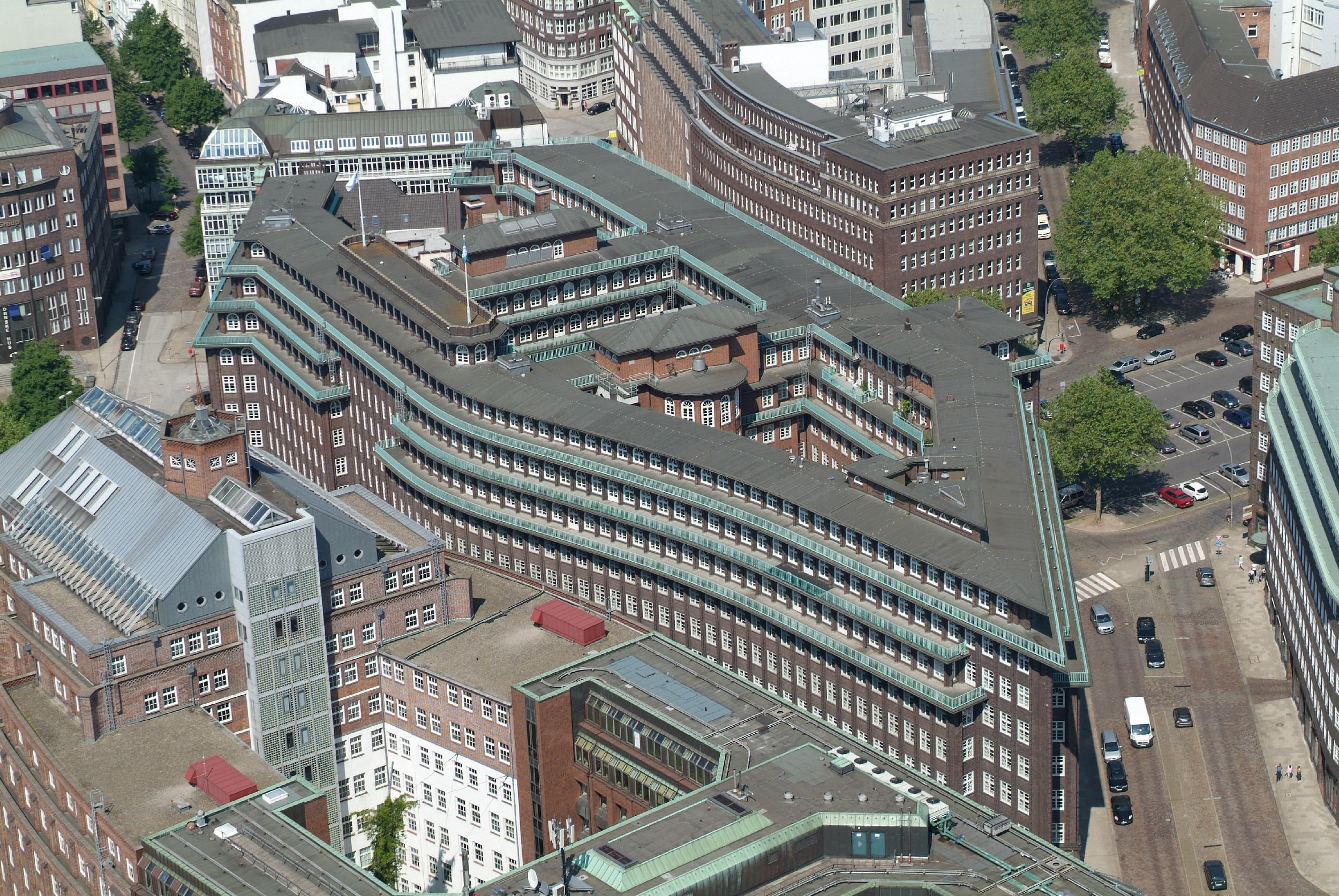
Aerial view, Kontorhausviertel

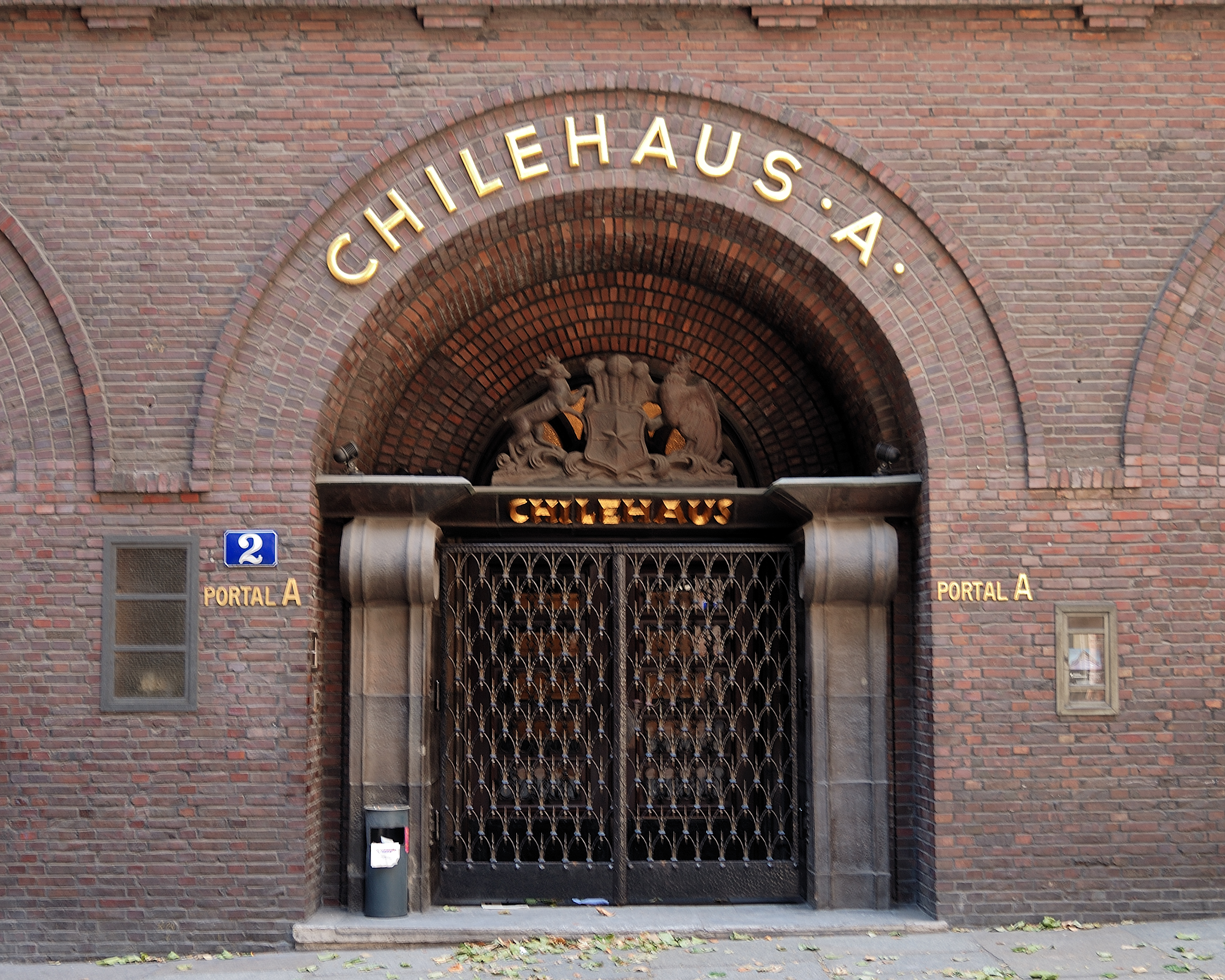
Entrance A - note the Coat of arms of Chile atop the gates.

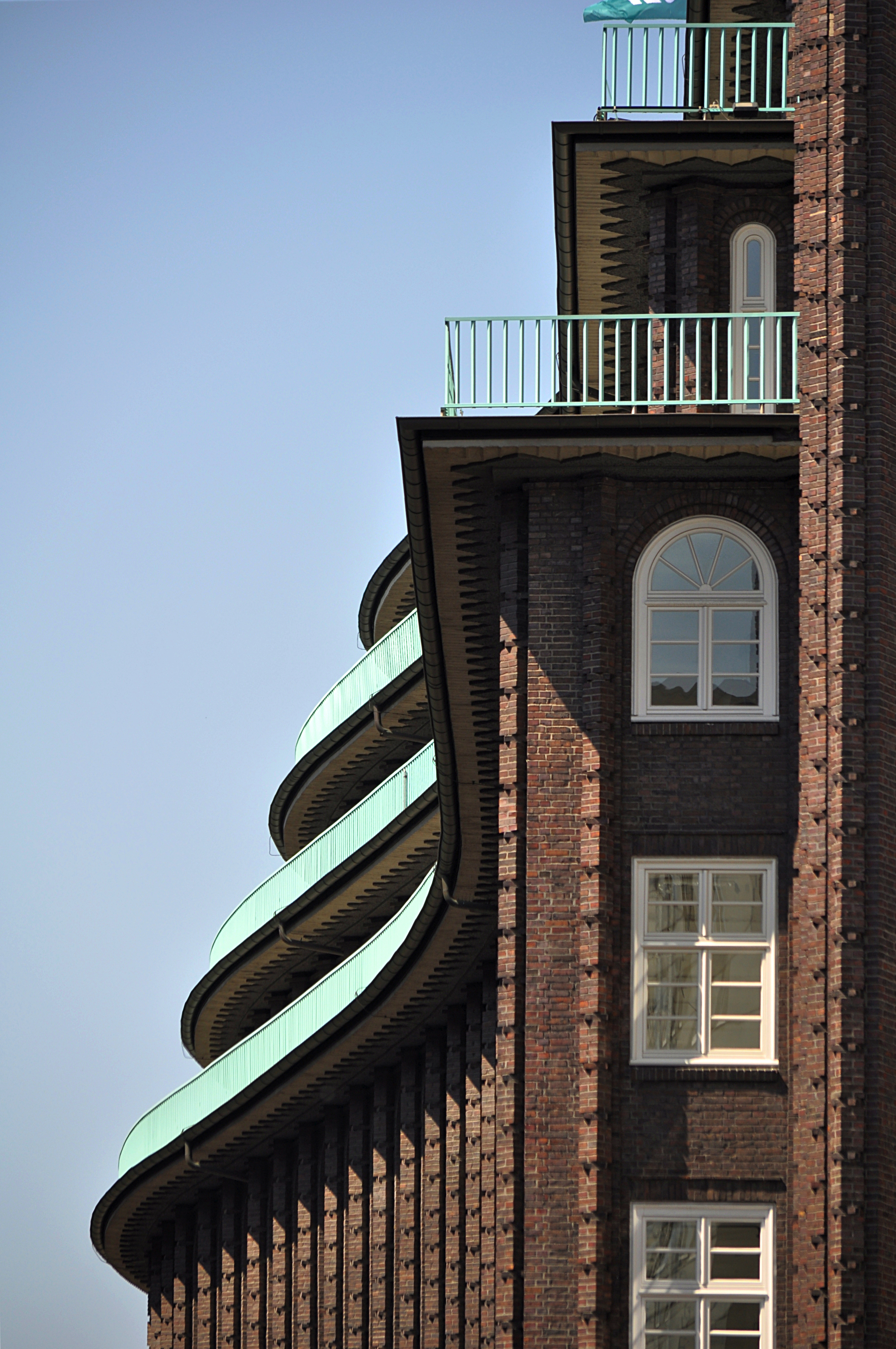
Facade details

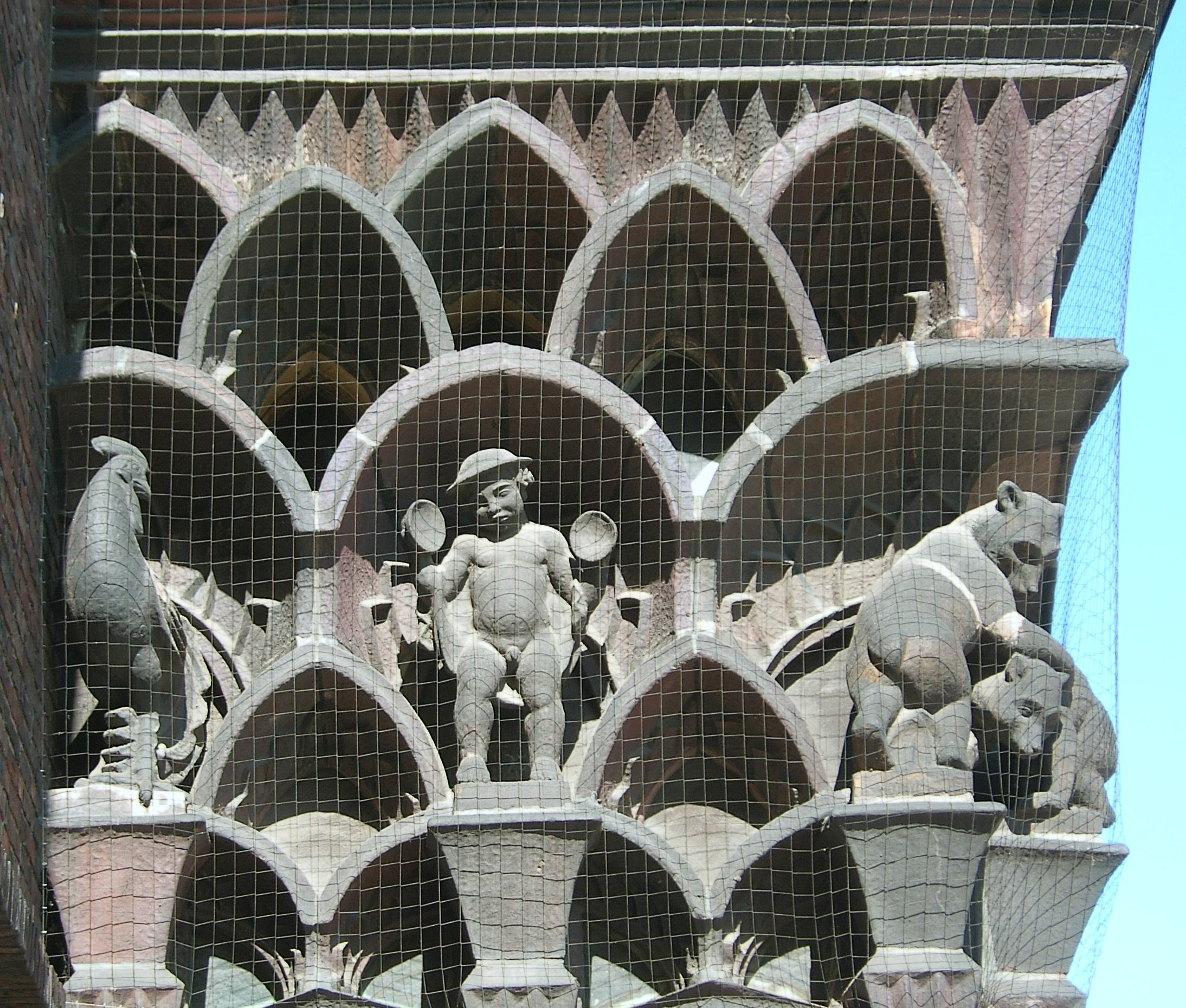

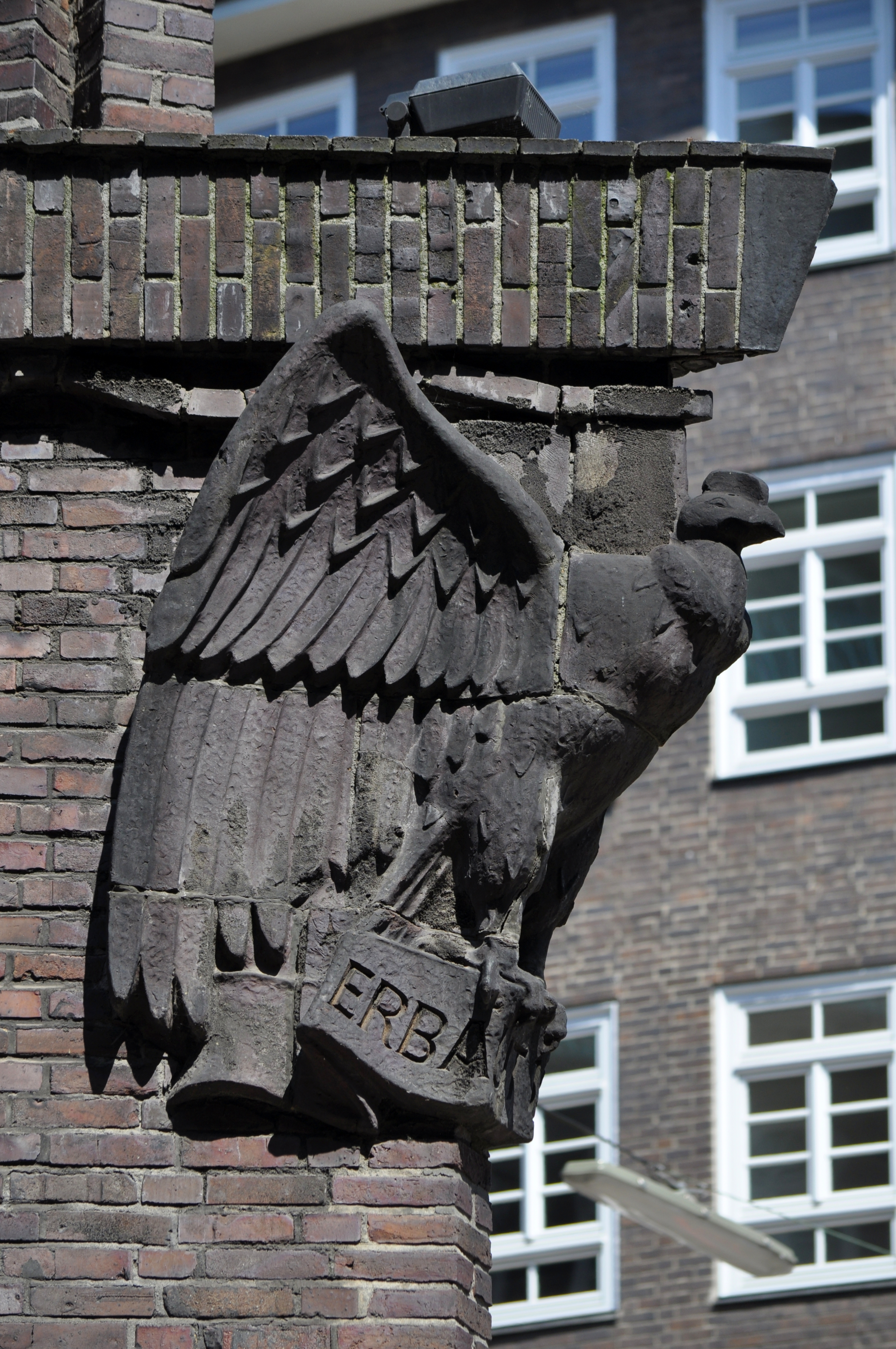
A condor, national bird of Chile.

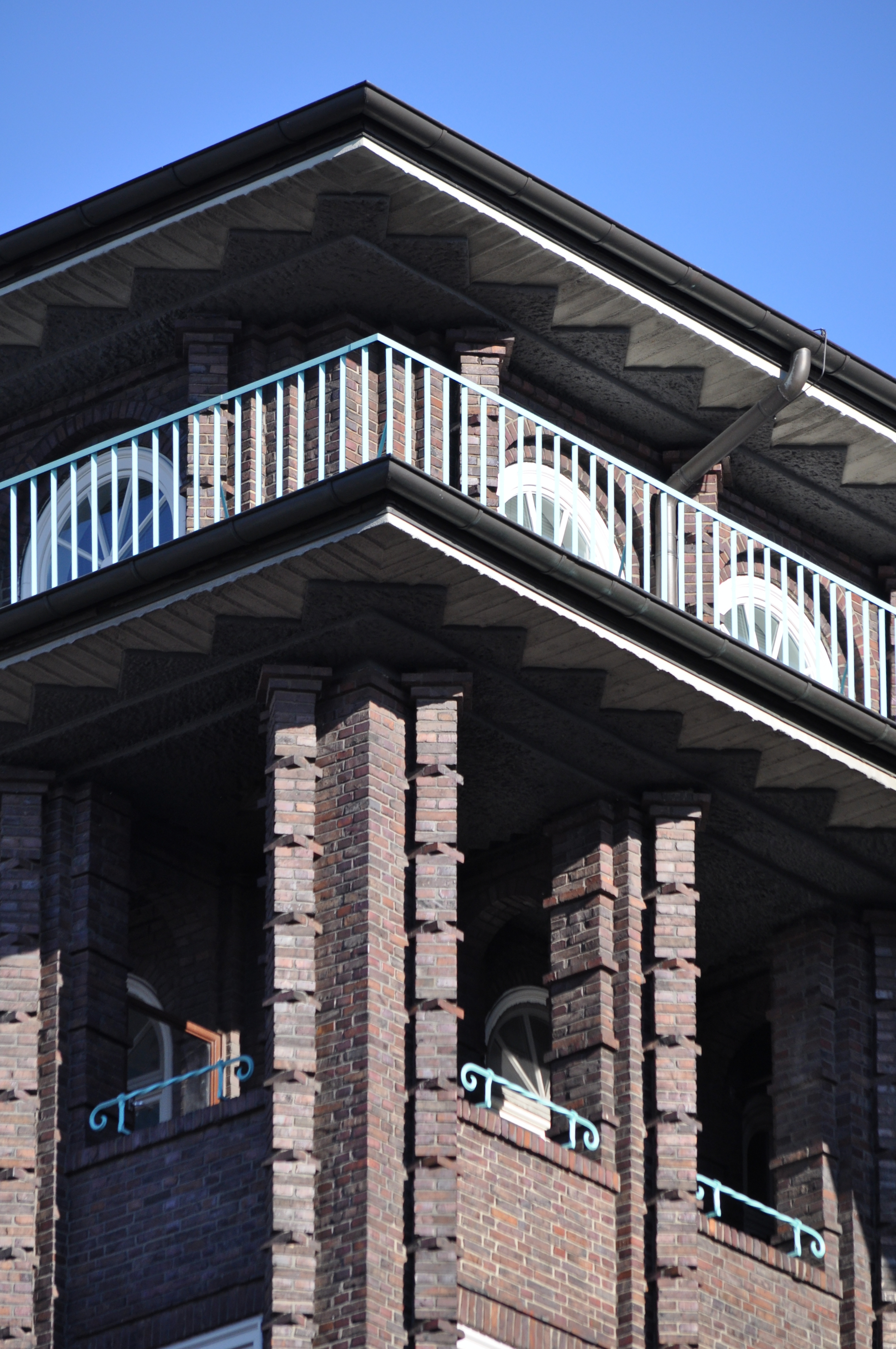

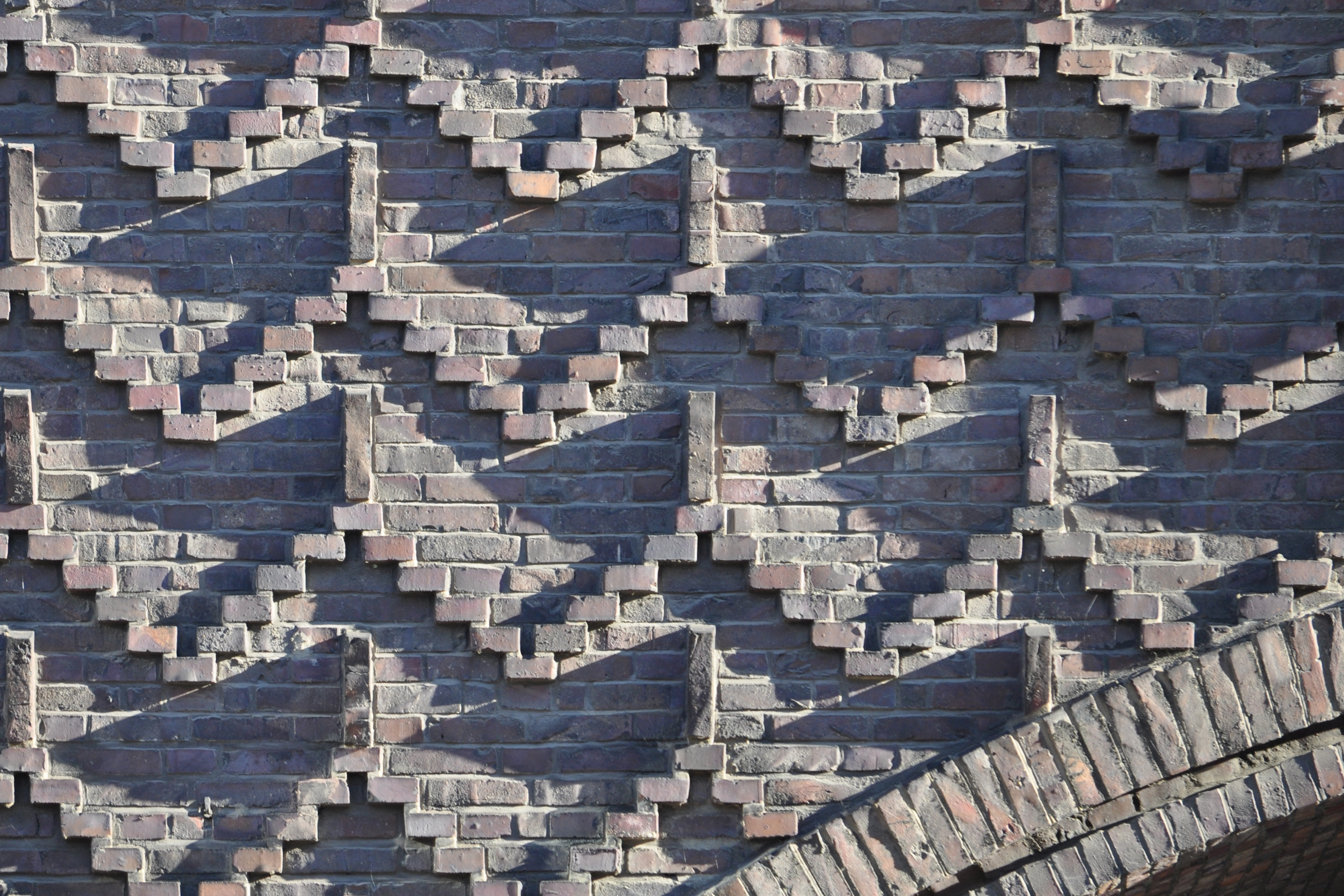

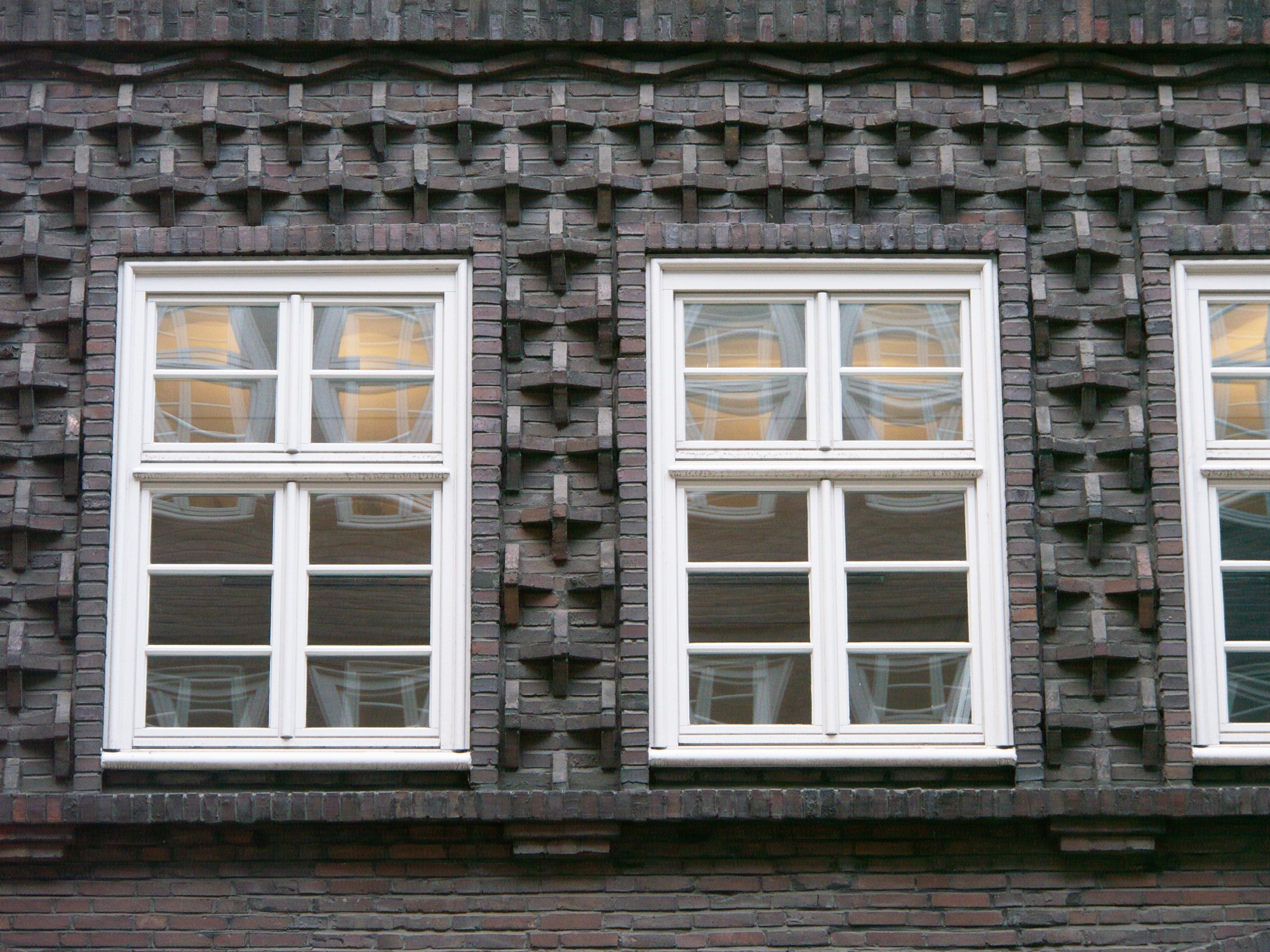

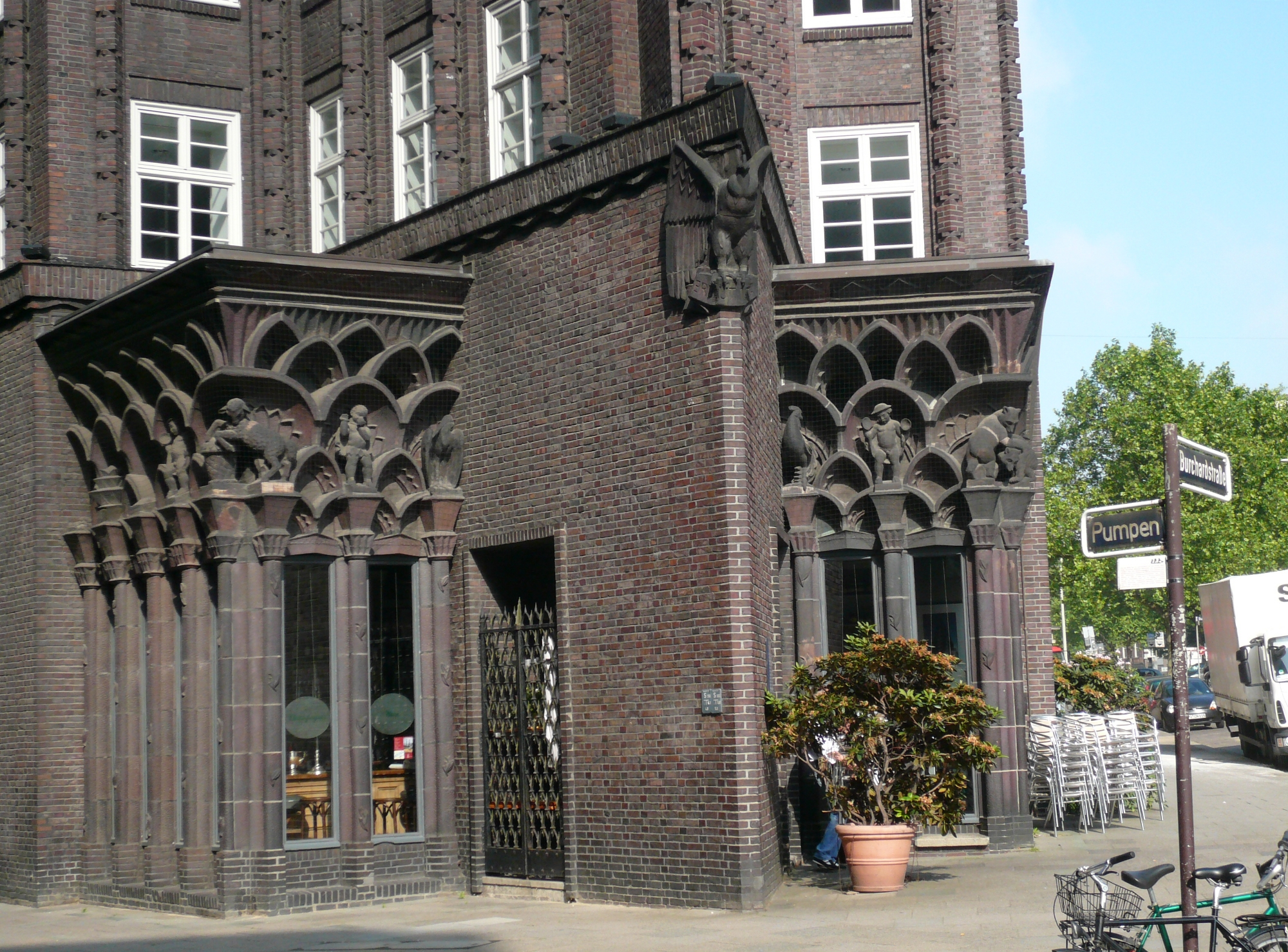
Ornaments at the tip

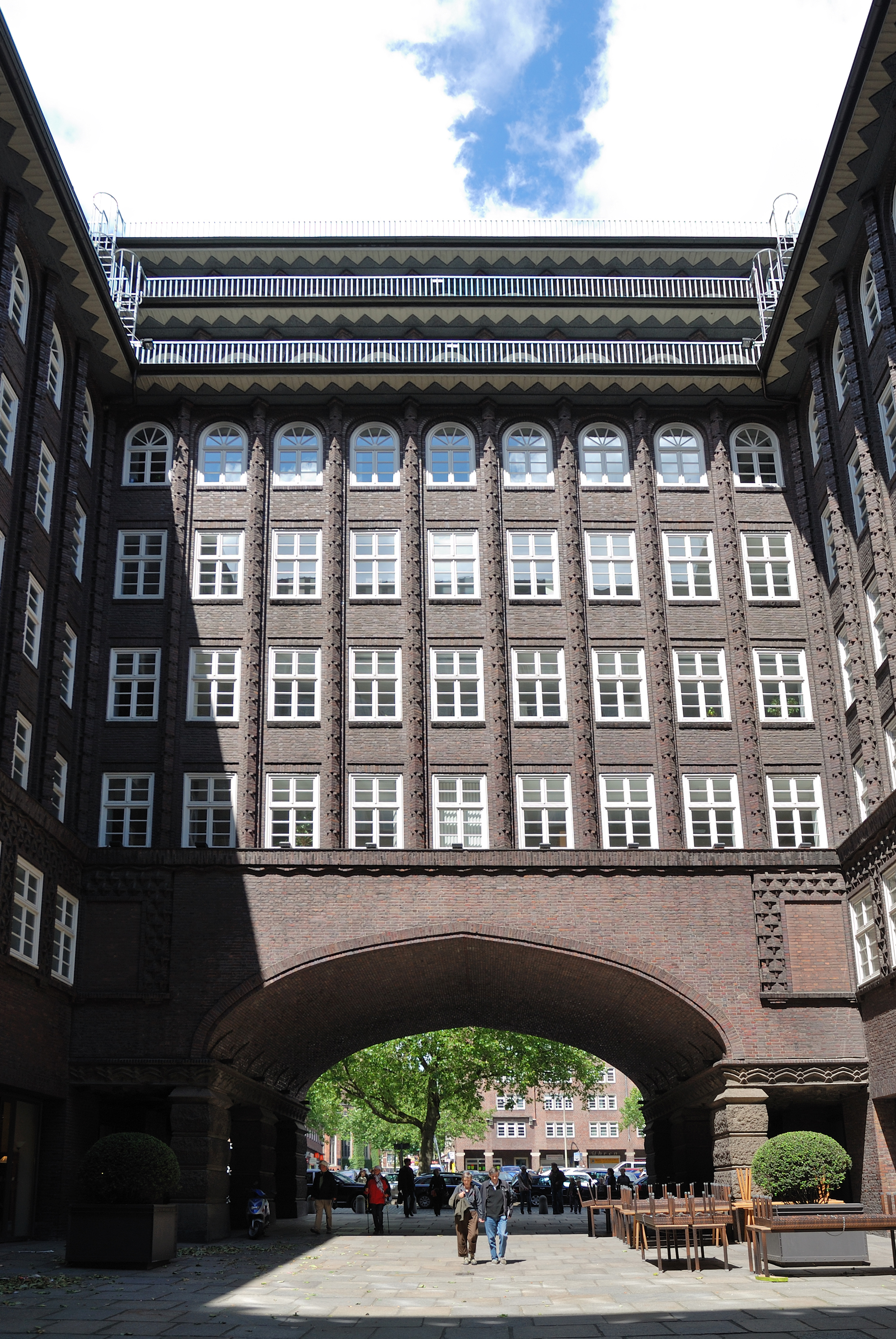
Courtyard

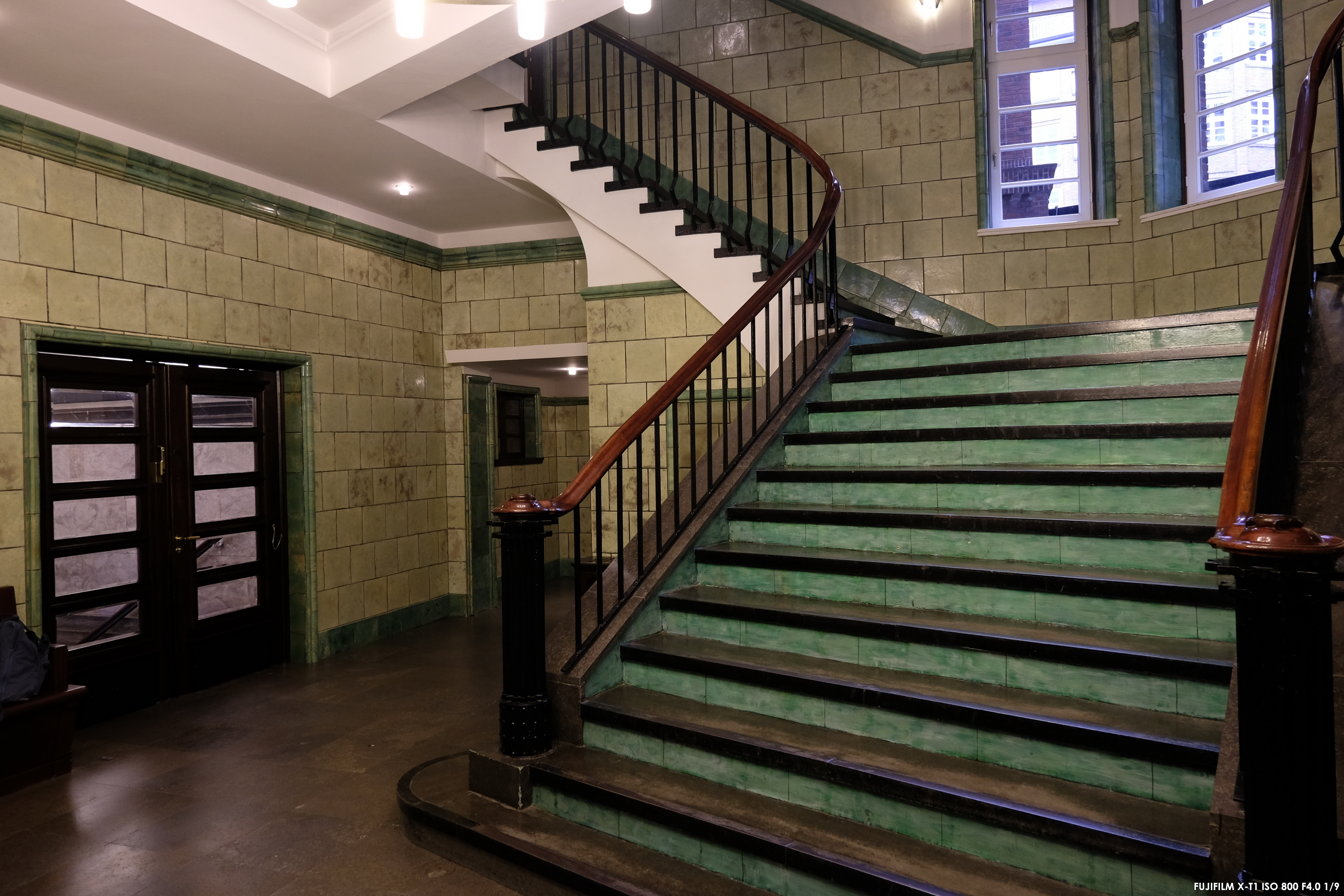

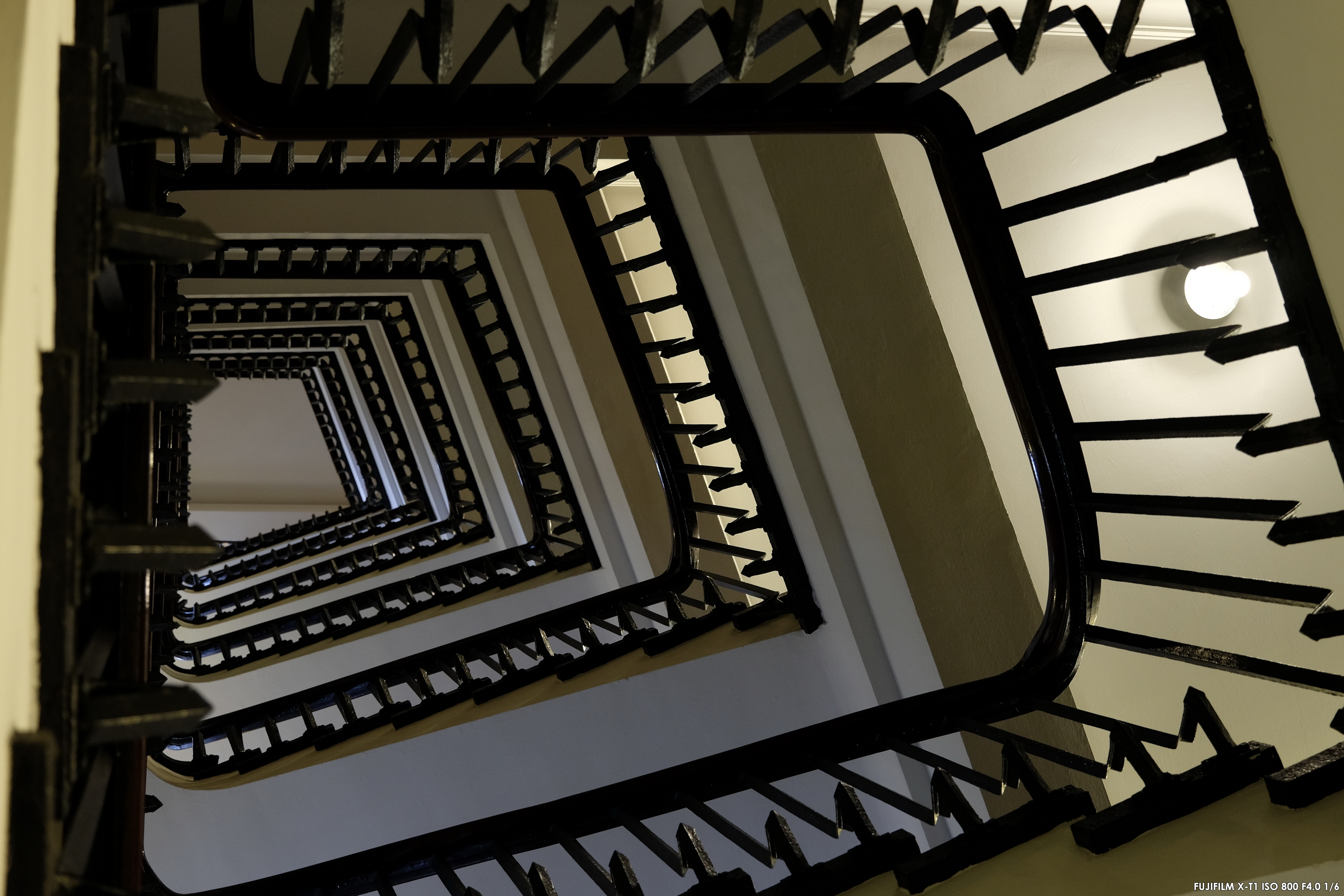

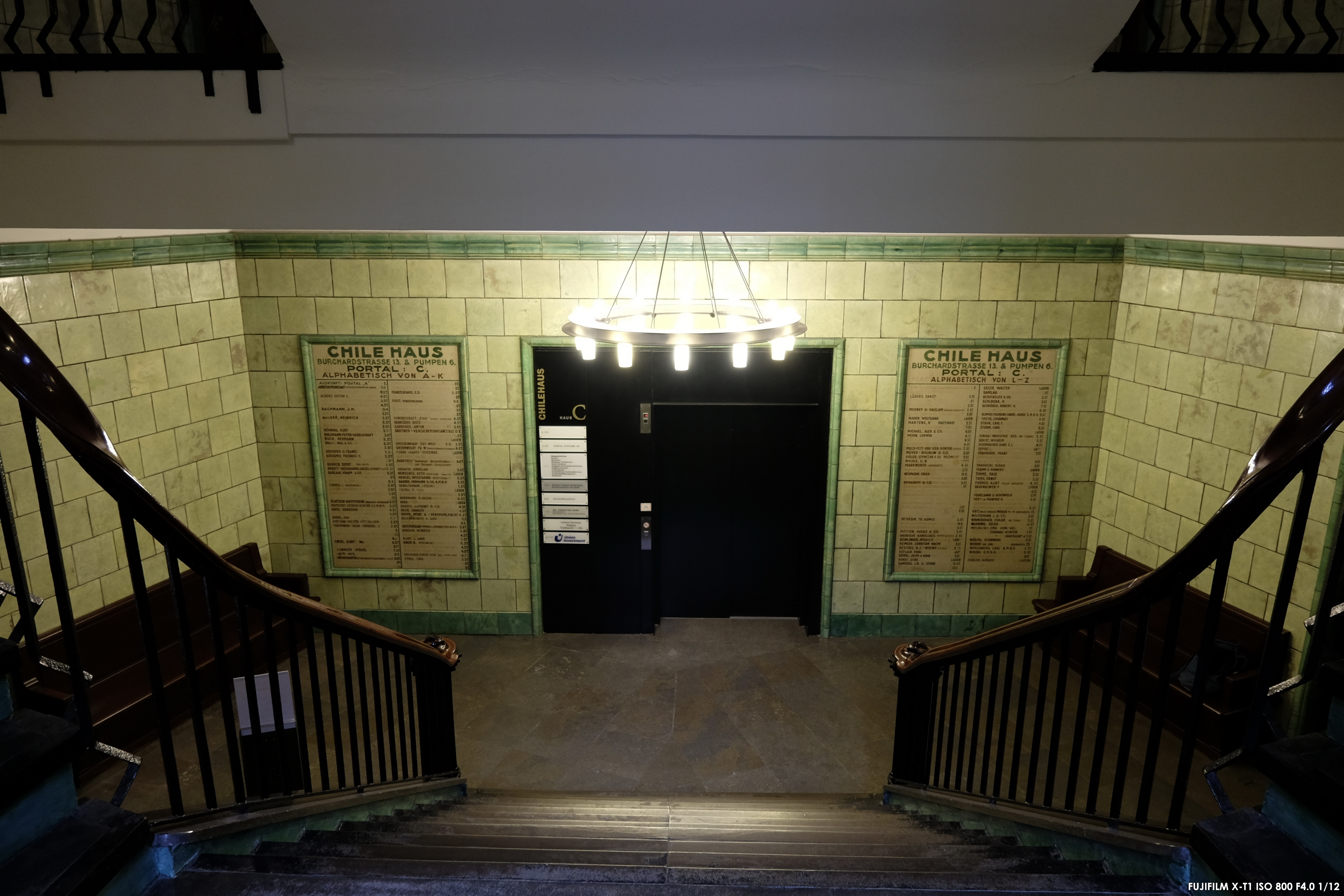
