= Fritz Höger =

German architect (1877–1949)

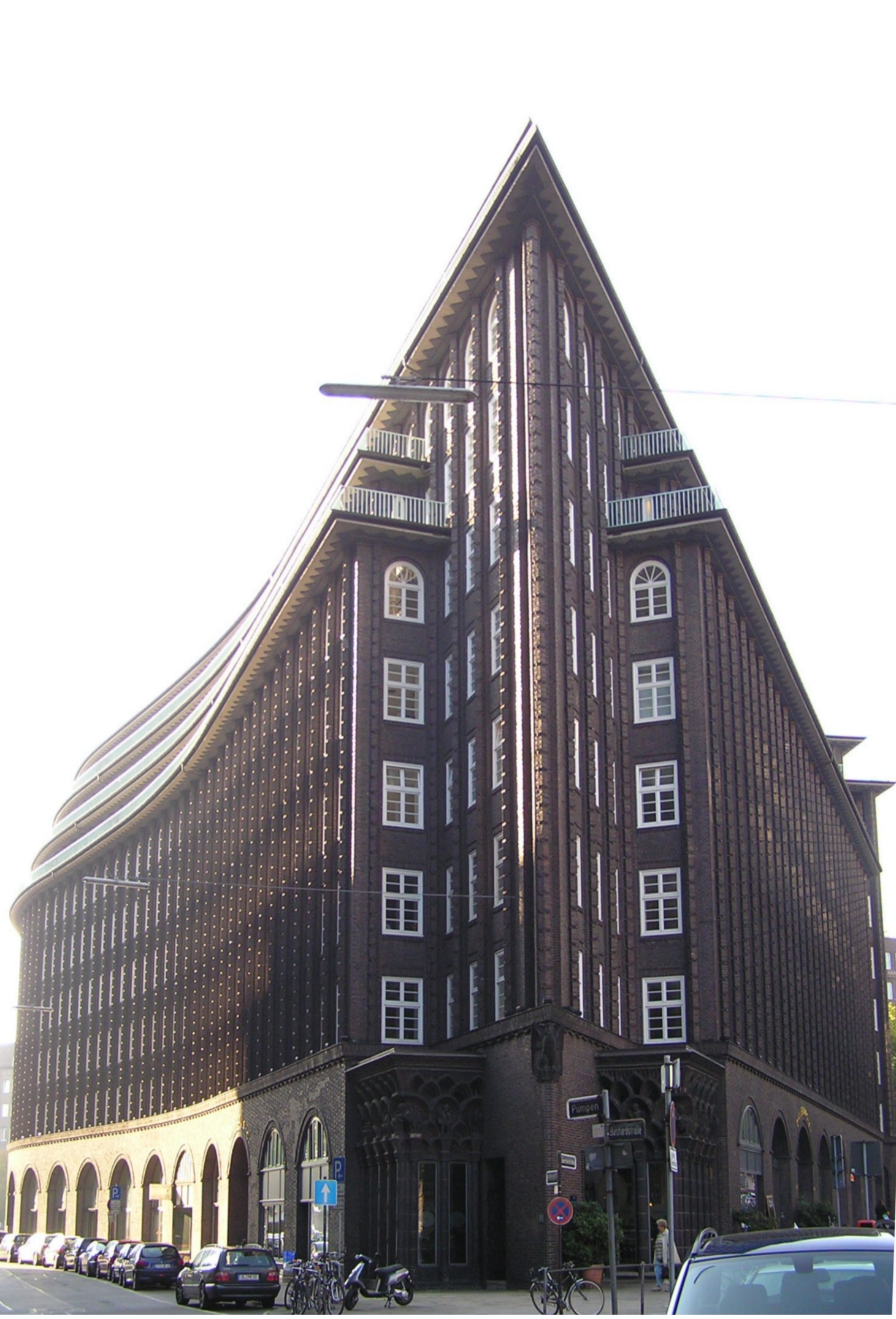
Chilehaus in Hamburg by Fritz Höger

Johann Friedrich (Fritz) Höger (12 June 1877 – 21 June 1949) was a German architect from Bekenreihe, Steinburg, Schleswig-Holstein in Northern Germany. Although never qualified as an architect, he became known for his Brick Expressionist style of architecture.

== Early life ==
Höger was the eldest of six siblings in a family who ran a small carpentry business. At the age of 14, Höger trained as a carpenter in Elmshorn and then went on to Hamburg for his masters which was completed in 1899. Following this he joined the architectural firm Lundt and Kallmorgen in Hamburg, where he worked as a technical draftsman. After his four-year stint there, Höger joined the company of his future father-in-law, Fritz Oldenburg, and married Fritz's daughter Annie in 1905.

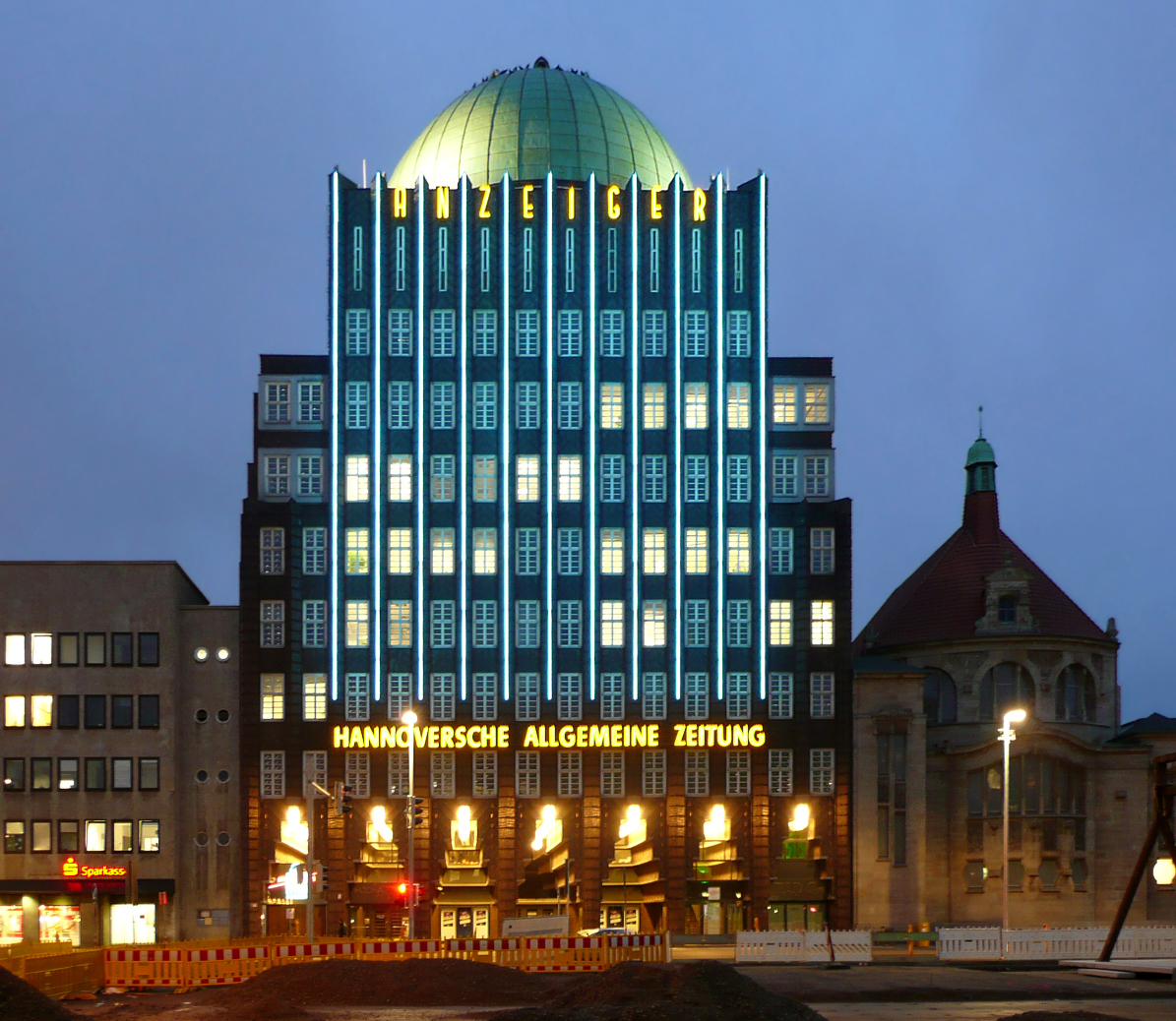
Anzeiger-Hochhaus, Hannover at night

== Architecture ==
Höger is renowned for his use of brick, in the style of Brick Expressionism. Höger opened his own architecture office in 1907, but because of his lack of higher education he was not admitted to the Association of German Architects. Regardless, he received many commissions for private homes around Hamburg. It was during this time that Höger established his style with the use of bricks, particularly clinker bricks, which are more robust and frost resistant due to the higher temperature they are fired at. Höger's style was seen in the 'dished house' which is now home to the department store Kaufhof. It features a strong vertical and horizontal layout with the placement of the eaves and stepped floors, a technique which became typical to Höger's style of building.

Höger's preference for the use of brick was along the lines of ideas espoused by Fritz Schumacher, the Hamburg chief architect beginning in 1909; Schumacher expounded his ideas in polemical writings, including the book Das Wesen des neuzeitlichen Backsteinbaues (The Essence of the Modern Brick Building), which appeared around 1920. Like Schumacher, Höger thought brick and clinker brick showed an "earthiness" that was familiar to the German people, particularly because these materials were typical for Northern Germany.

His best-known work is the Chilehaus in Hamburg, constructed between 1922–24 for saltpeter importer Henry B. (Chile) Sloman. The office block features a curving facade reminiscent of a ship's hull, coming together at a sharp angle on the corners of Pumpen and Niedernstrasse.

Höger constructed several other buildings, more prominently a publishing office which included a planetarium, the Anzeiger-Hochhaus (Gazette-Building) between 1927–1928. The 51m high building was the first skyscraper in Hannover. It features a now green copper dome and red clinker bricks offset with a decorative gold. The dome originally housed a planetarium, and is now a cinema.

Other notable works include the Kirche am Hohenzollernplatz in Berlin and the Wilhelmshaven town hall.

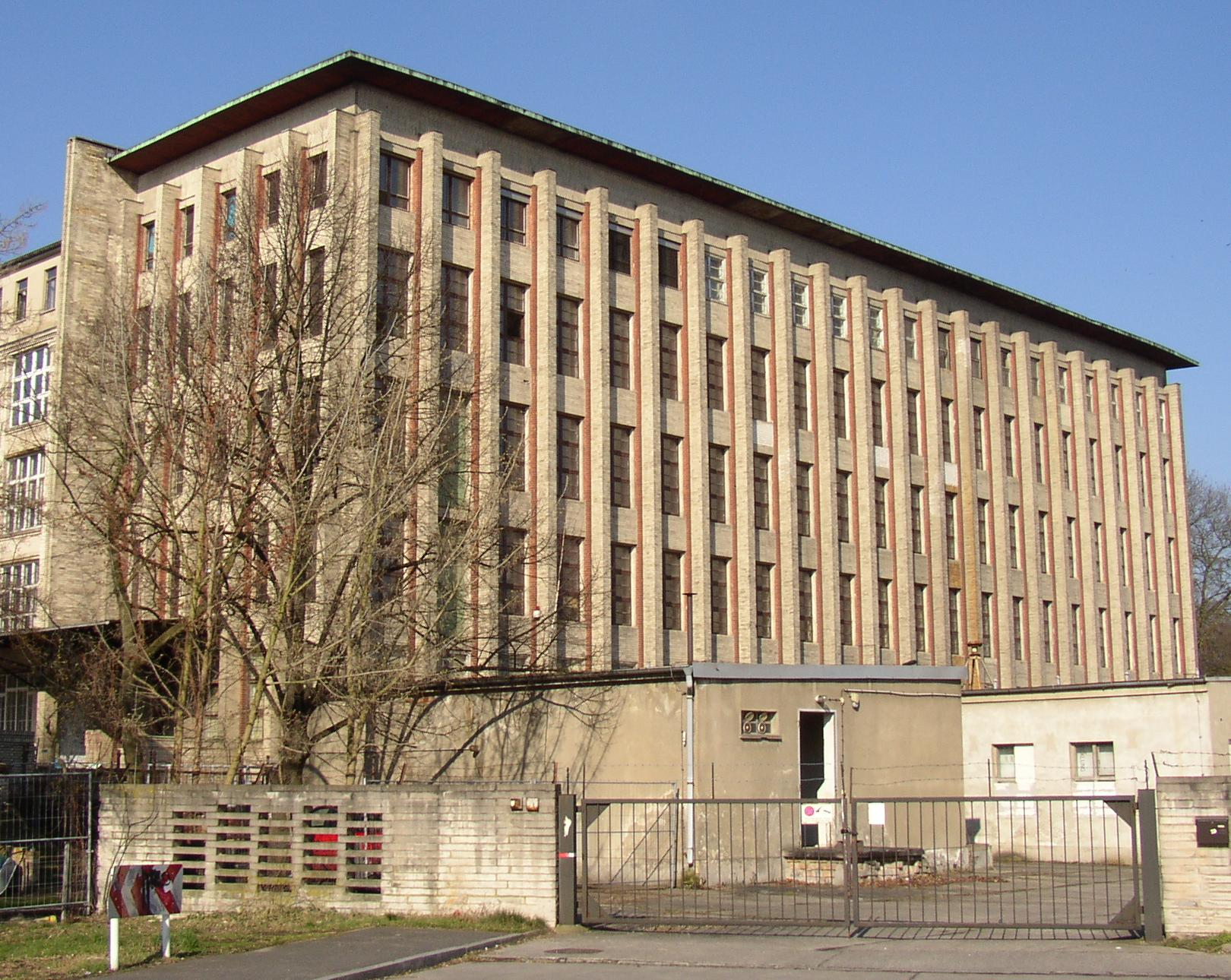
Garbáty cigarette factory in Berlin-Pankow

In 1927 Höger joined the cultural staff of the Völkischer Beobachter and joined the NSDAP in 1932.

== War ==
From 1914 to 1918 Höger completed his military duty in the first world war in Flanders, France.

Later during World War II Höger sympathized with National Socialism (Nazism) and joined the party in 1932. However his expressionistic style did not meet Hitler's taste. As Höger did not follow the preferred classicist marble style of Nazi architecture, he could not obtain a position as state architect.

== Fritz Höger Award ==
For the first time in 2008, the Fritz Höger Prize was awarded for excellence in brick architecture. The initiative goes for buildings with brick, with winners in the categories of detached or semi-detached houses, apartment buildings, office, commercial, leisure and sport, as well as public buildings. In addition, two awards for Passive House and restoration and sustainability have been awarded. The competition is endowed with 10,000 euros.

- Winners 2008 awards
- Winners 2011 awards
- Winners 2014 awards
- Winners 2017 awards
- Winners 2020 awards
