= Hans Wagner (sculptor) =

German sculptor and painter (1905–1982)

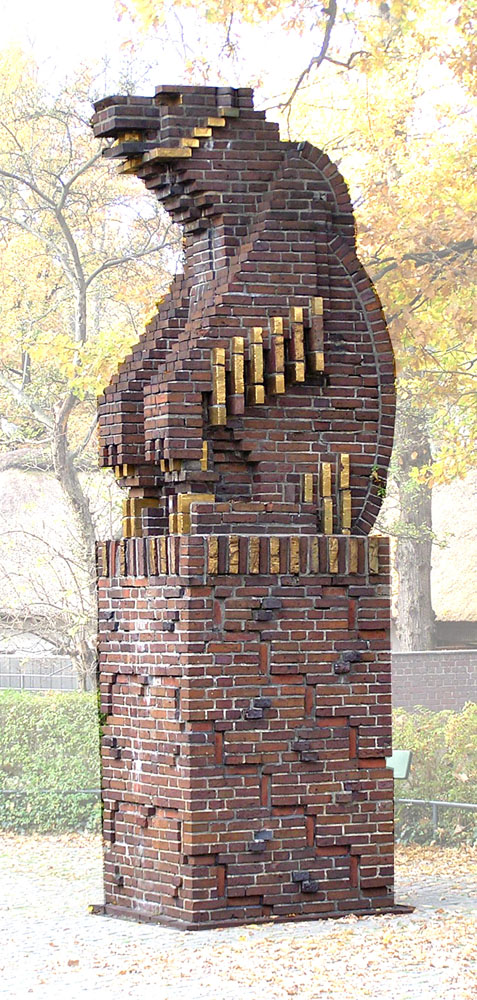
Bear sculpture in the Berlin Zoo

Hans Wagner (25 January 1905 – 15 July 1982) was a German sculptor and painter.

== Biography ==
Hans Wagner was born in Alzey on 25 January 1905 as the eldest of four sons. His father Johann Lorenz Wagner was head of the trade school in Colmar where Wagner also spent his childhood. During the First World War Hans Wagner had to change to a school in Sasbach am Kaiserstuhl. The Treaty of Versailles of June 1919 forced the Wagner family to leave Alsace and to move to Urberach in southern Hesse.

From 1921 to 1923 Wagner studied at the Städelschule in Frankfurt am Main with Friedrich Christoph Hausmann and Johann Vincenz Cissarz. Due to his unemployment after his studies Wagner moved back in with his parents. From 1924 Wagner worked as a sculptor in Eberstadt. At the end of the same year he moved to Hamburg and began an education as a theatre painter at the Deutsches Schauspielhaus. After the end of his education he went on study trips to Rome and Paris where he dealt with new techniques. After his return to Germany he worked as a freelance artist. As a freelance sculptor he specialized in building sculpture and wall painting. This also led to contact with the architect Fritz Höger, whose most important artistic advisor he became. For the Sprinkenhof in Hamburg, designed by Höger, Wagner created four large sandstone sculptures; two of which were destroyed by bombs in 1943.

In 1941 Wagner was drafted into the Wehrmacht. Many of Wagner's works were destroyed when bombs hit his studio in 1943. At the end of the 1940s he met Hans Waltenberg, director of Deutsche Bundesbahn. By him Wagner received commissions for murals, mosaics and frescoes in German railway stations.

In 1951 Wagner moved with his family to Bad Soden am Taunus. Through the construction projects of his brother Ferdinand he received many public and private commissions in the entire Frankfurt area. During the following years Wagner created numerous new works. During the last years before his death, however, he only dealt with drawings, paintings, small sculptures and reliefs, most of which remained in his family's possession.

Wagner was married twice and had one daughter. After suffering from cancer he died in Bad Soden am Taunus on 15 July 1982.

== Works ==
- Zwei Löwen (Two Lions) at the main portal of the Wilhelmshaven town hall; 1929
- Bärenskulptur (Bear sculpture) in the Berlin Zoo; 1930
- Four large sandstone sculptures for the Sprinkenhof in Hamburg (two were destroyed by a bomb in 1943); 1932
- Marienzyklus in the Catholic church in Schneidhain, oil painting on plywood cassettes in the gallery balustrade; 1949
- Karlssage on the southern Römerberg, bas-relief; 1925–1955
- Weltenrad, bas-relief in the inner courtyard and sgraffiti on the facades of the Torhaus in Frankfurt am Main; 1952–1955
- Heavenly Liturgy and Secret Revelation in the Church of the Holy Cross in Gonzenheim, four large windows, stained glass; 1954
- Throne of Christ, high altarpiece in the St. Gallus church in Urberach; 1955
- Several works in St. Catherine in Bad Soden am Taunus: Crucified Christ (glass mosaic), Baptism of Christ and Resurrection of Christ (glass mosaics), Pietà (ceramic mosaic), Archangel Gabriel and Archangel Michael (mural painting with scratching technique), I am the door (mural fresco); 1956
- Nixe mit Heilwasserschale (Mermaid with healing-water bowl) and Nixe mit Sodener Wappen (Mermaid with Soden coat of arms), bas-reliefs in the arches of the doors in the Sodener bathhouse; 1961
- Theater – Sport – Musik (Theatre – Sport – Music) Copper relief at the Hasselgrundhalle in Bad Soden am Taunus; 1974
- Löwe (Lion), large bronze sculpture on the Löwenplatz in Rüsselsheim am Main; 1974

== Gallery ==
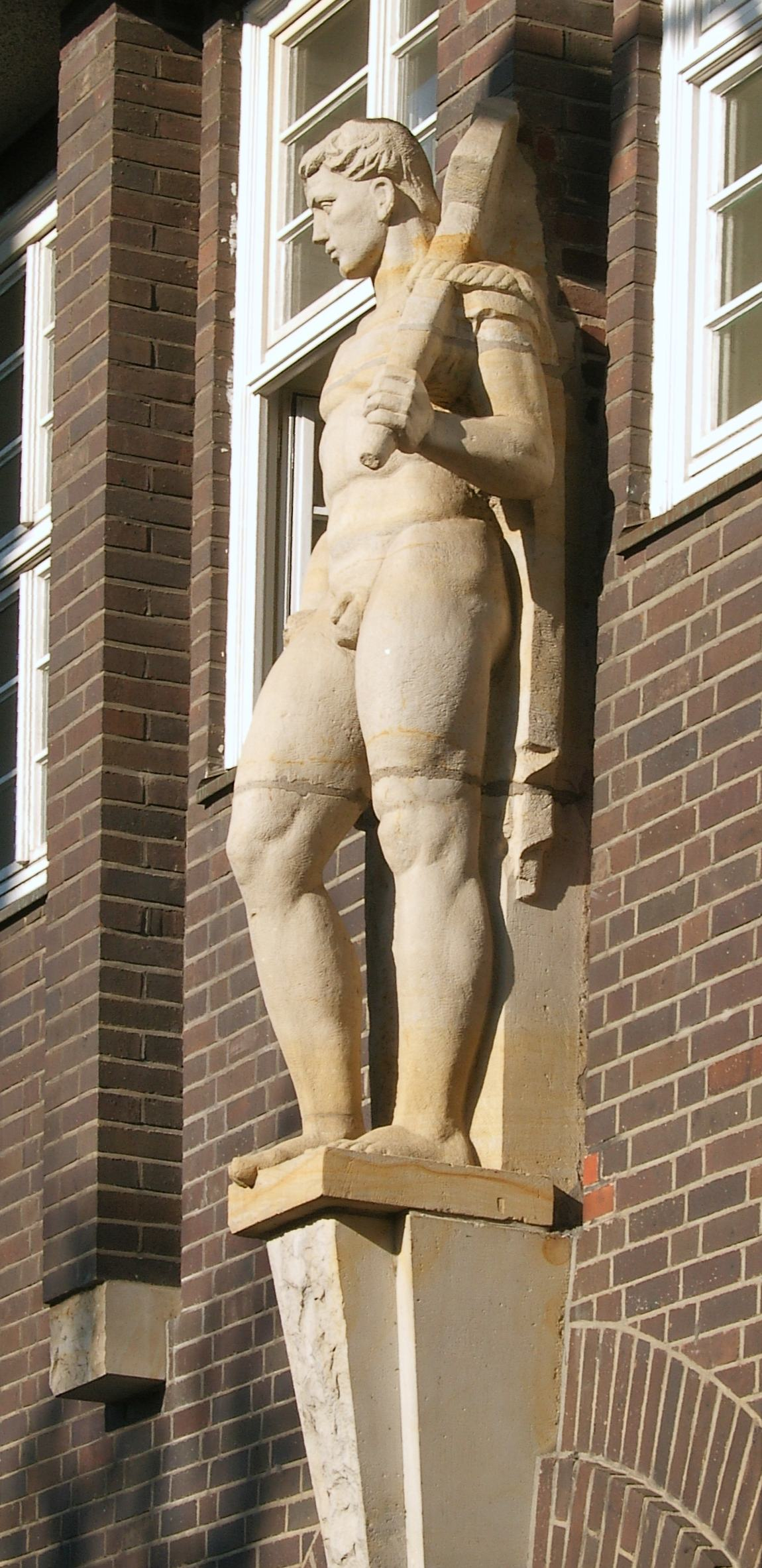
Male figure (Sprinkenhof)

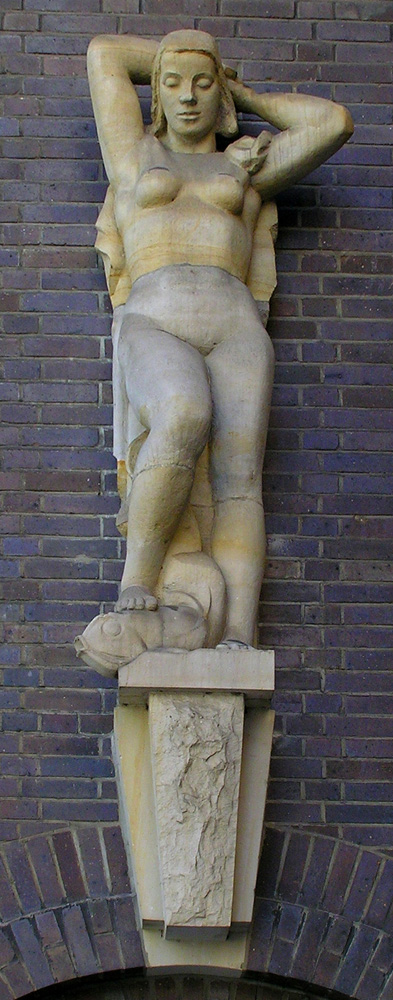
Female Figure (Sprinkenhof)

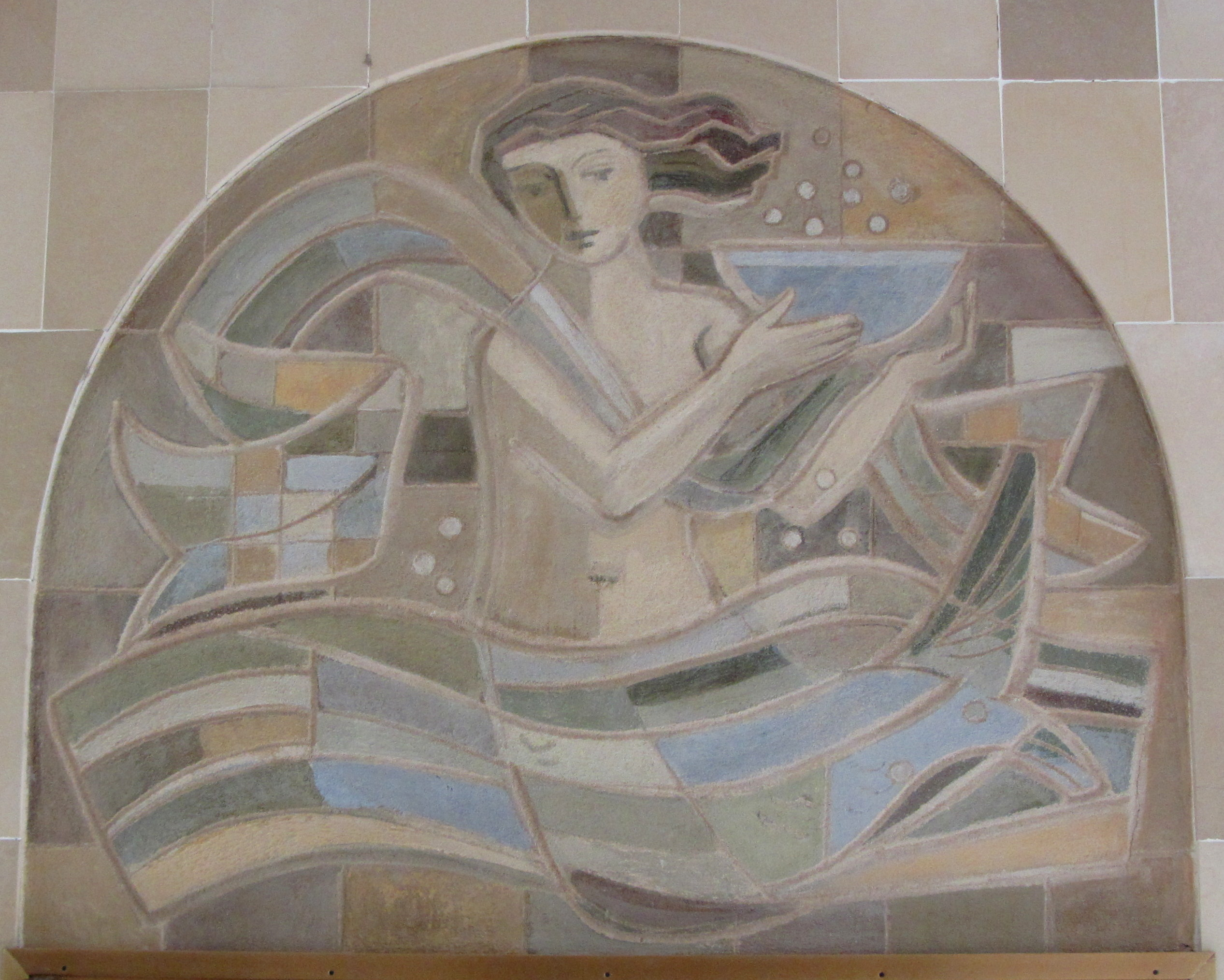
Mermaid with healing-water bowl; bathhouse Bad Soden

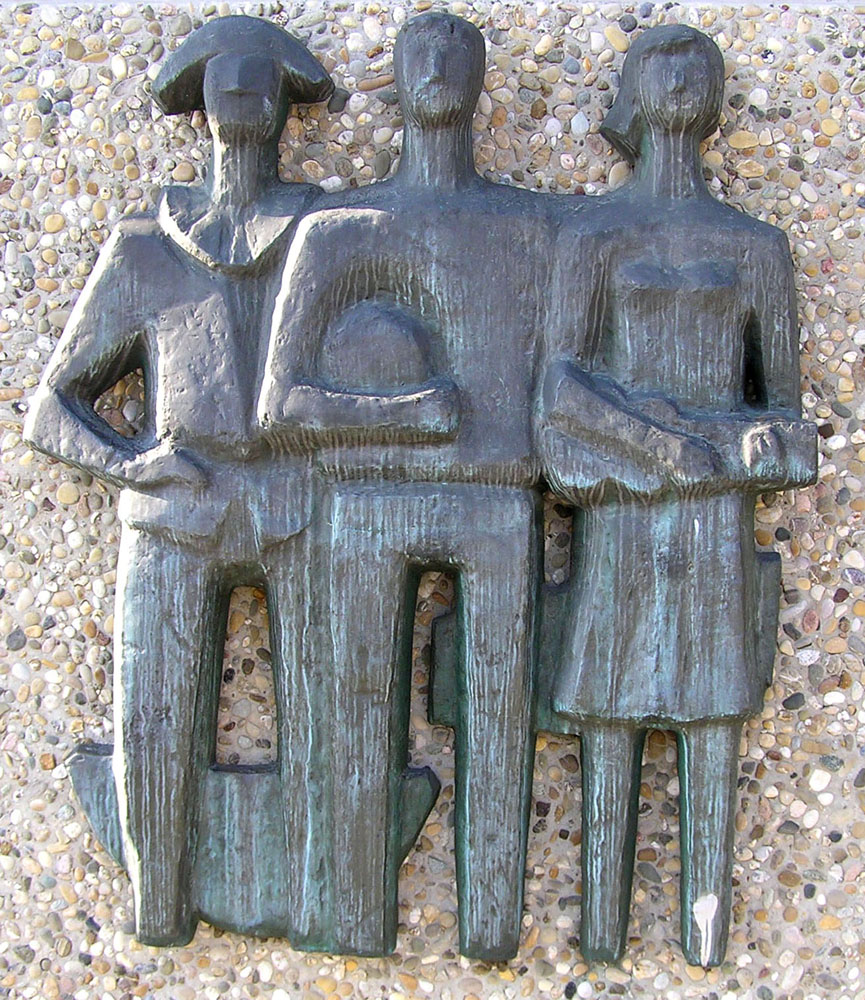
Copper relief at the Hasselgrundhalle in Bad Soden am Taunus

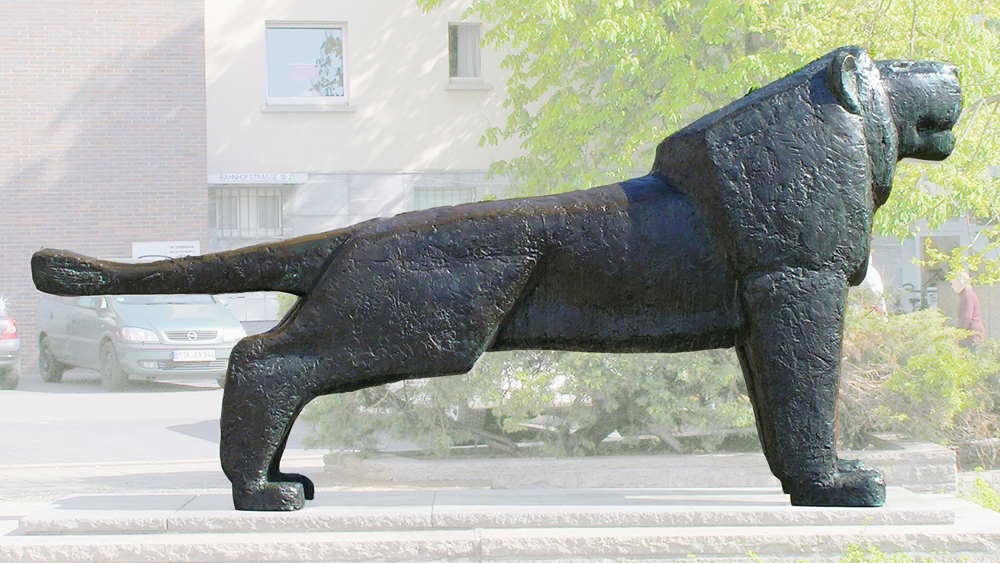
Lion on the Löwenplatz in Rüsselsheim am Main
