= Sprinkenhof =

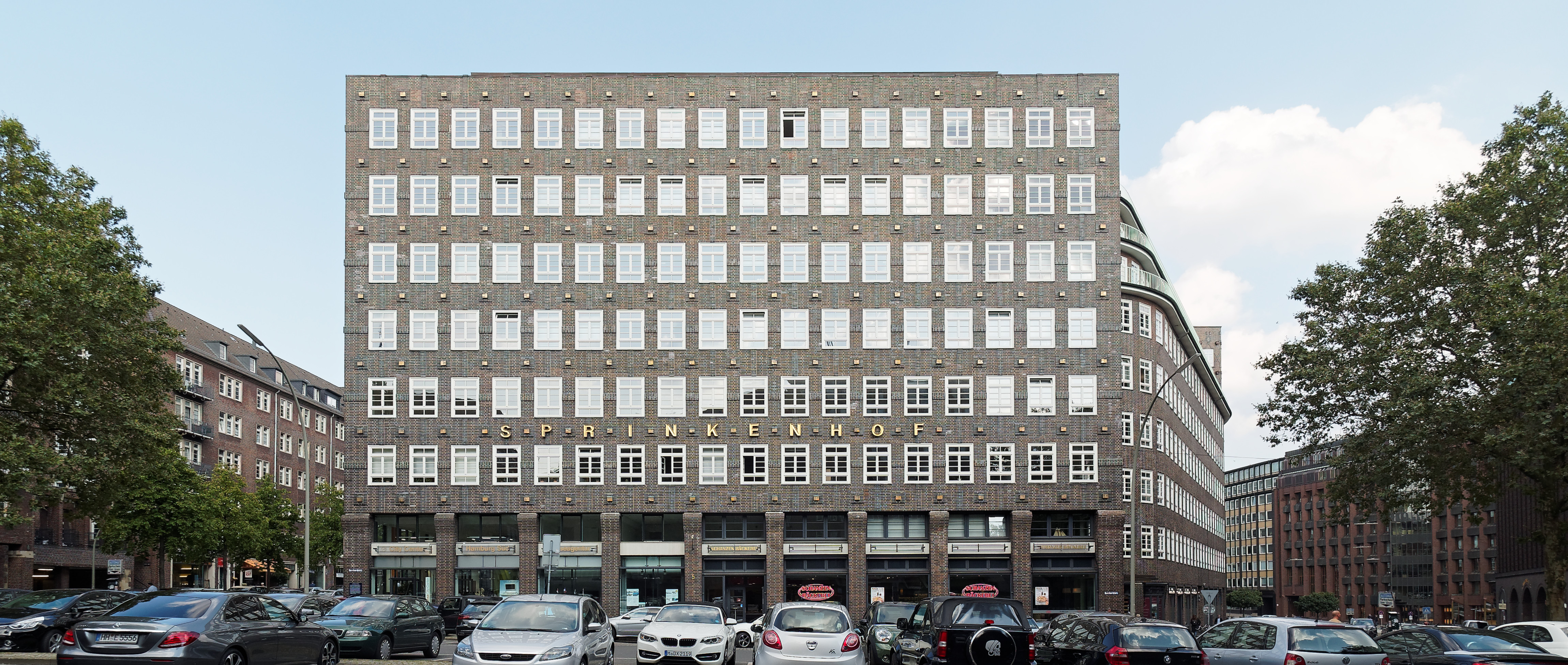
West side of the building at Burchardplatz

The Sprinkenhof is a nine-storey office building built between 1927 and 1943 in Hamburg's Kontorhaus District. The complex borders the streets Altstädter Straße, Burchardstraße and Johanniswall, and the Springeltwiete runs through the inner courtyard. The Chilehaus is located directly to the northeast, separated only by the main road. As part of Kontorhaus District, the Sprinkenhof was inscribed as a UNESCO World Heritage Site in 2015.

== History ==
The architects Fritz Höger and Hans and Oskar Gerson worked together on the planning and execution of the building. Planning began in 1925. The original design provided for 122 apartments with a total area of 10,600 m^{2}, but this was not realized. Hamburg's first underground car park was built in the basement of the Sprinkenhof. The eastern wing at Johanniswall was built by Höger alone; Hans Gerson had already died in 1931 and Oskar Gerson was no longer allowed to exercise his profession. Between 1999 and 2002 the building ensemble was partially rebuilt and comprehensively renovated.

== Architecture ==
The Gersons were inspired by both the Doge's Palace in Venice and the Casa de las Conchas in Salamanca. At the corner Niedernstraße/Johanniswall the building has a "round corner" – a typical style element of this time. The Sprinkenhof was built in skeleton construction made from reinforced concrete and is another example of Brick Expressionism. At the time of its construction it was Europe's largest office building.

The facade was decorated with rhombic clinker patterns to underline the block character. In addition, the facade was decorated with clinker and terracotta. The facade opposite the Chilehaus is covered with ornaments referencing Hamburg hanseatic history such as seagulls, the coat of arms, cogwheels or sailing ships. Numerous ornaments were designed by Ludwig Kunstmann, who also created a fist for the building, which includes a golden hammer.

Four sculptures were created by Hans Wagner, two of which were destroyed by bombs in 1943. One male and one female sculpture are still preserved.

== Gallery ==
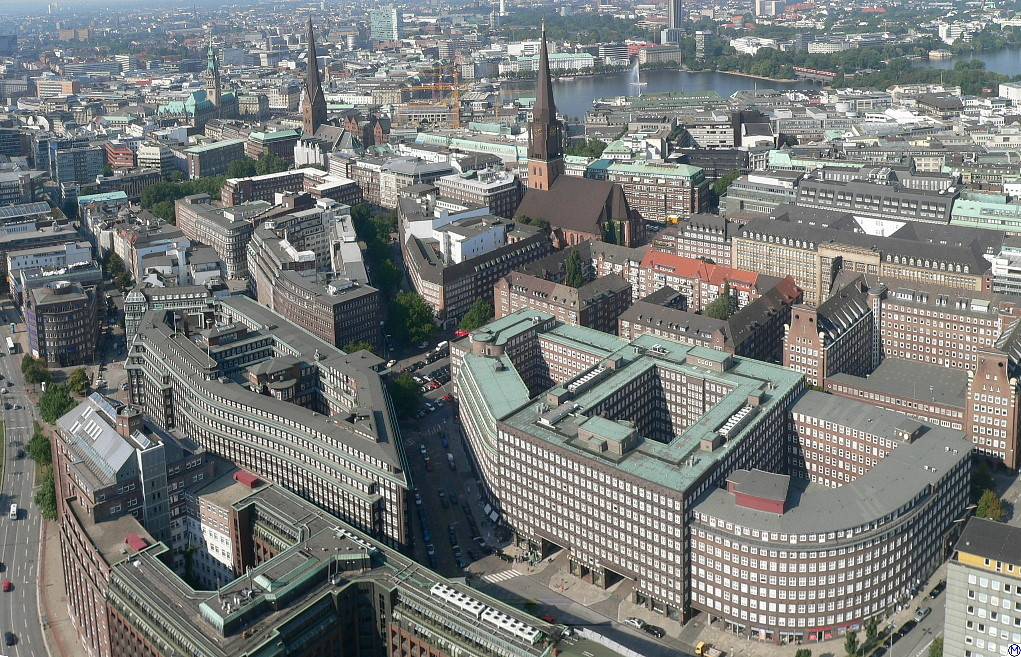
Sprinkenhof (right) and Chilehaus (left)

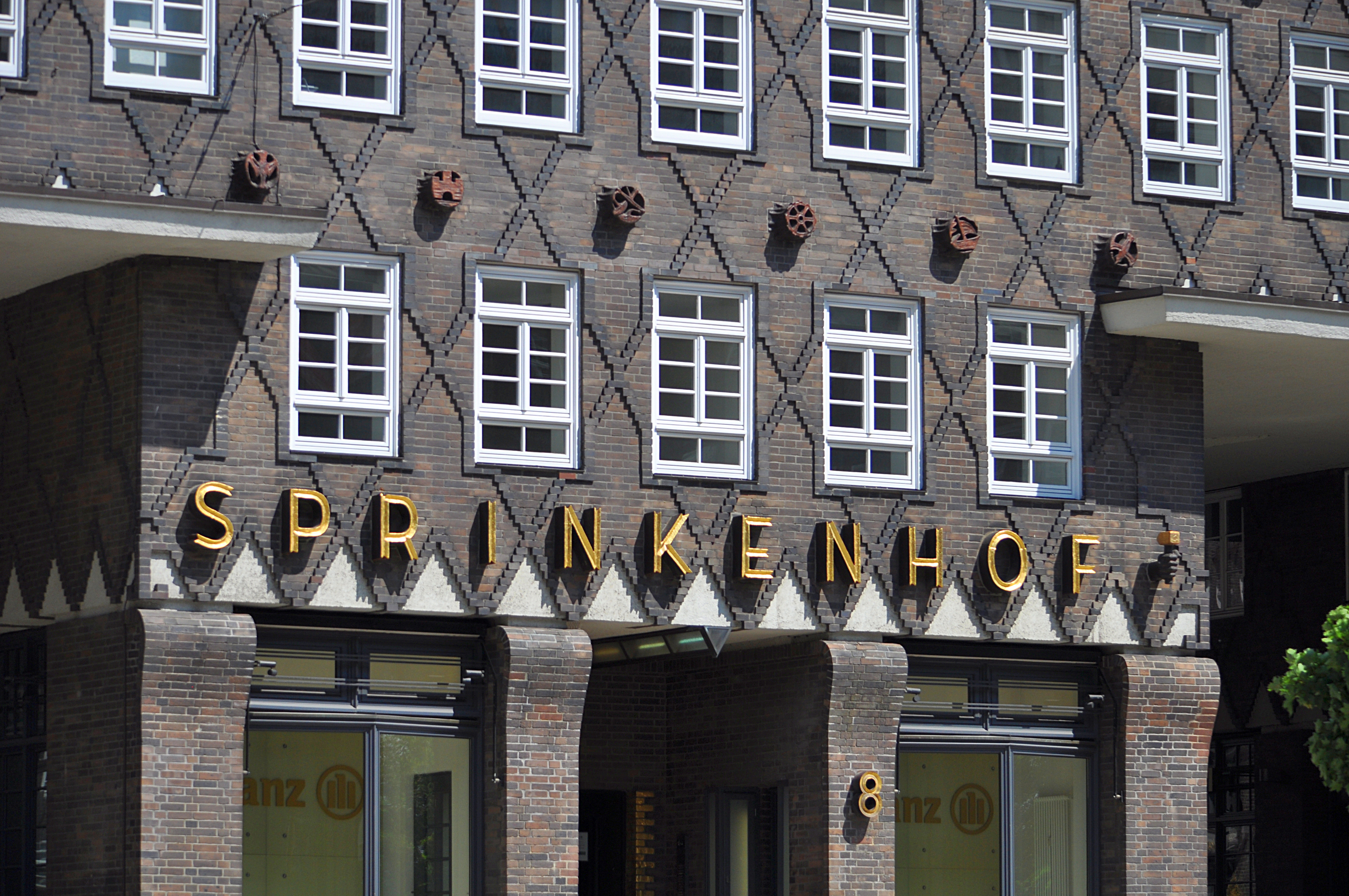
Facade details

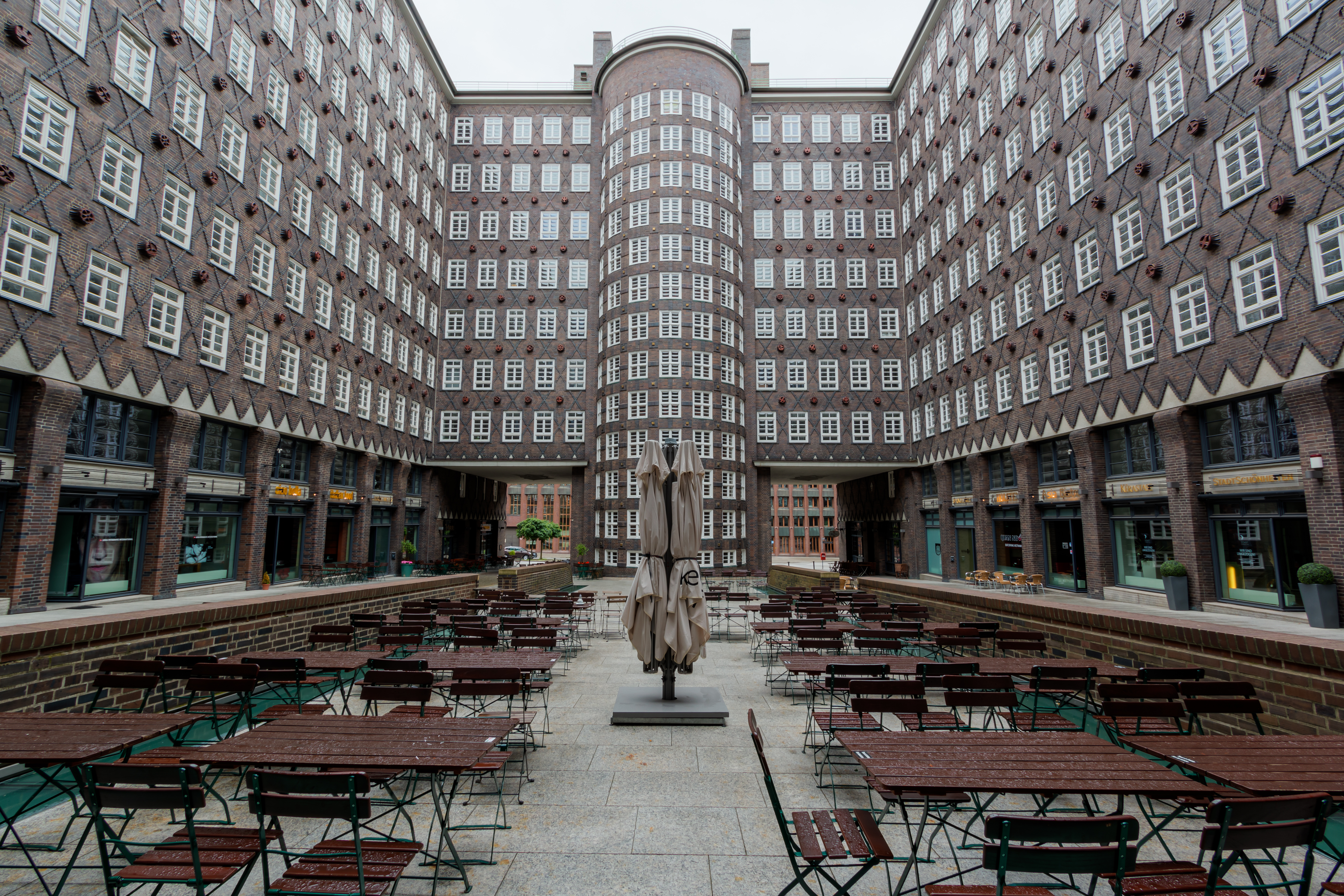
Inner courtyard

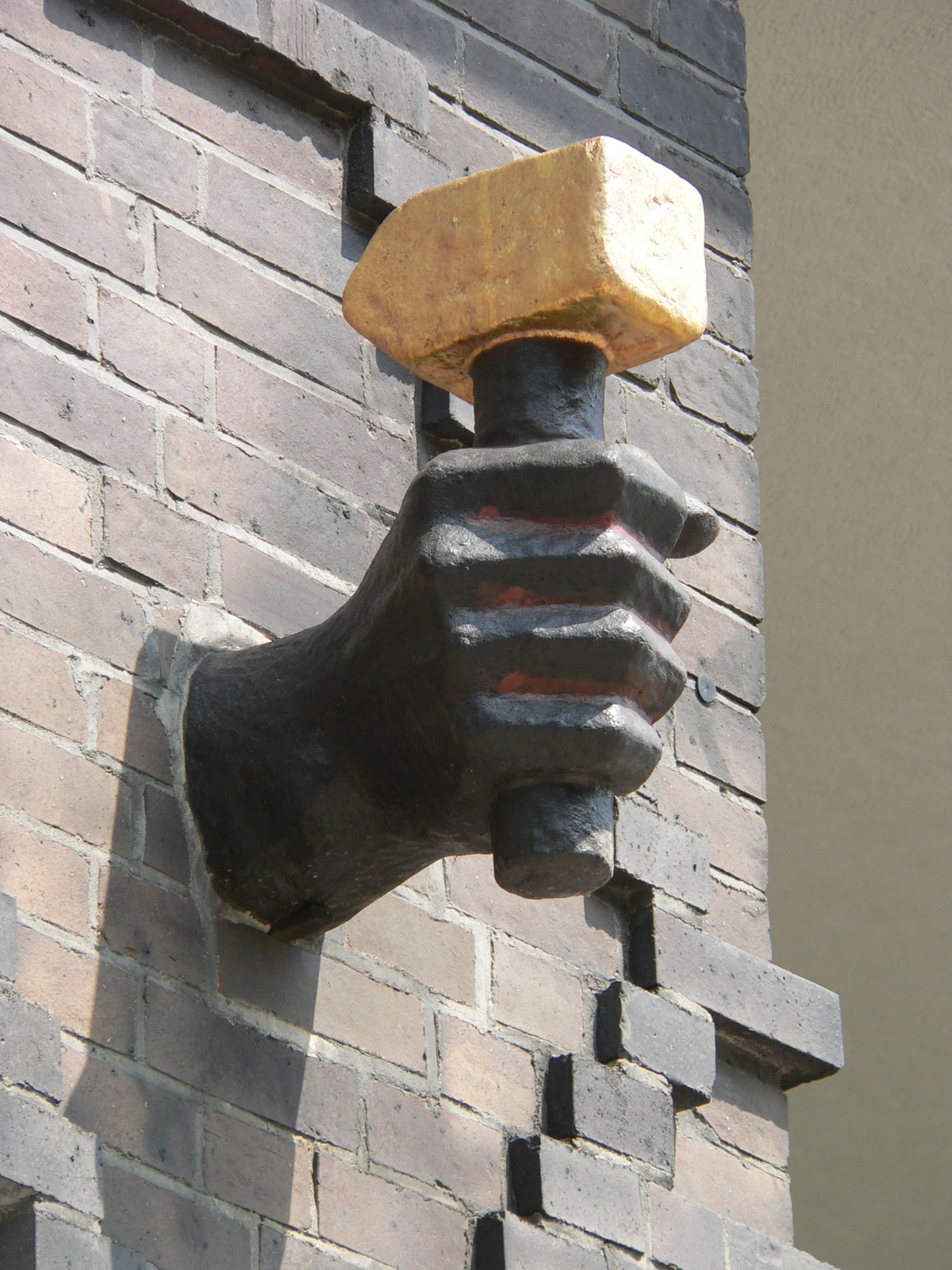
Golden Hammer by Ludwig Kunstmann

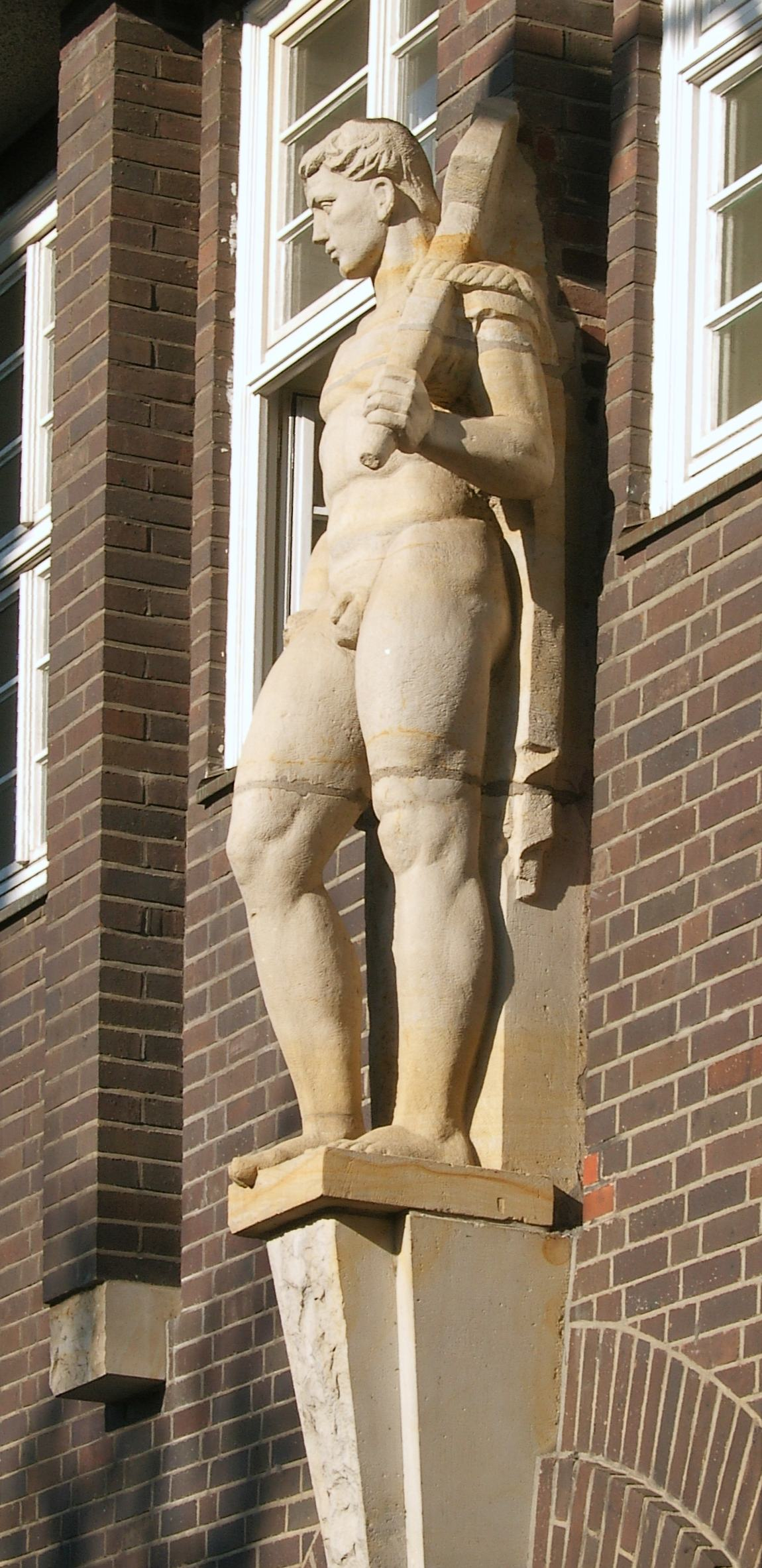
Male figure with hammer by Hans Wagner

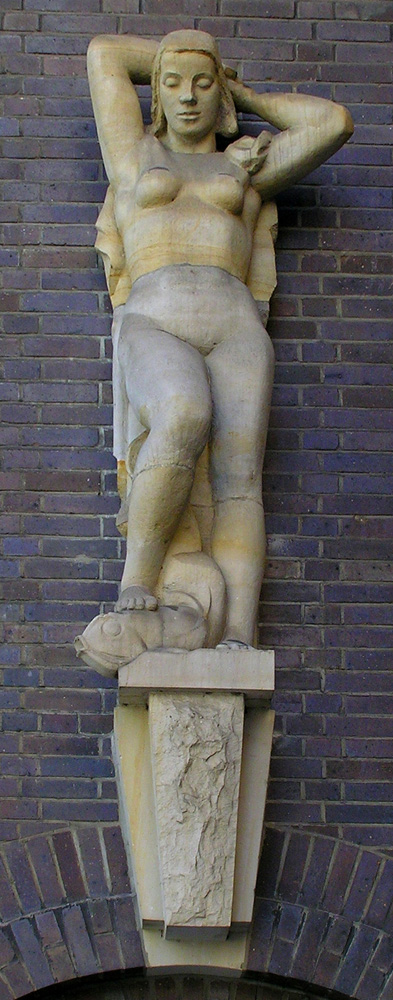
Female figure with fish by Hans Wagner

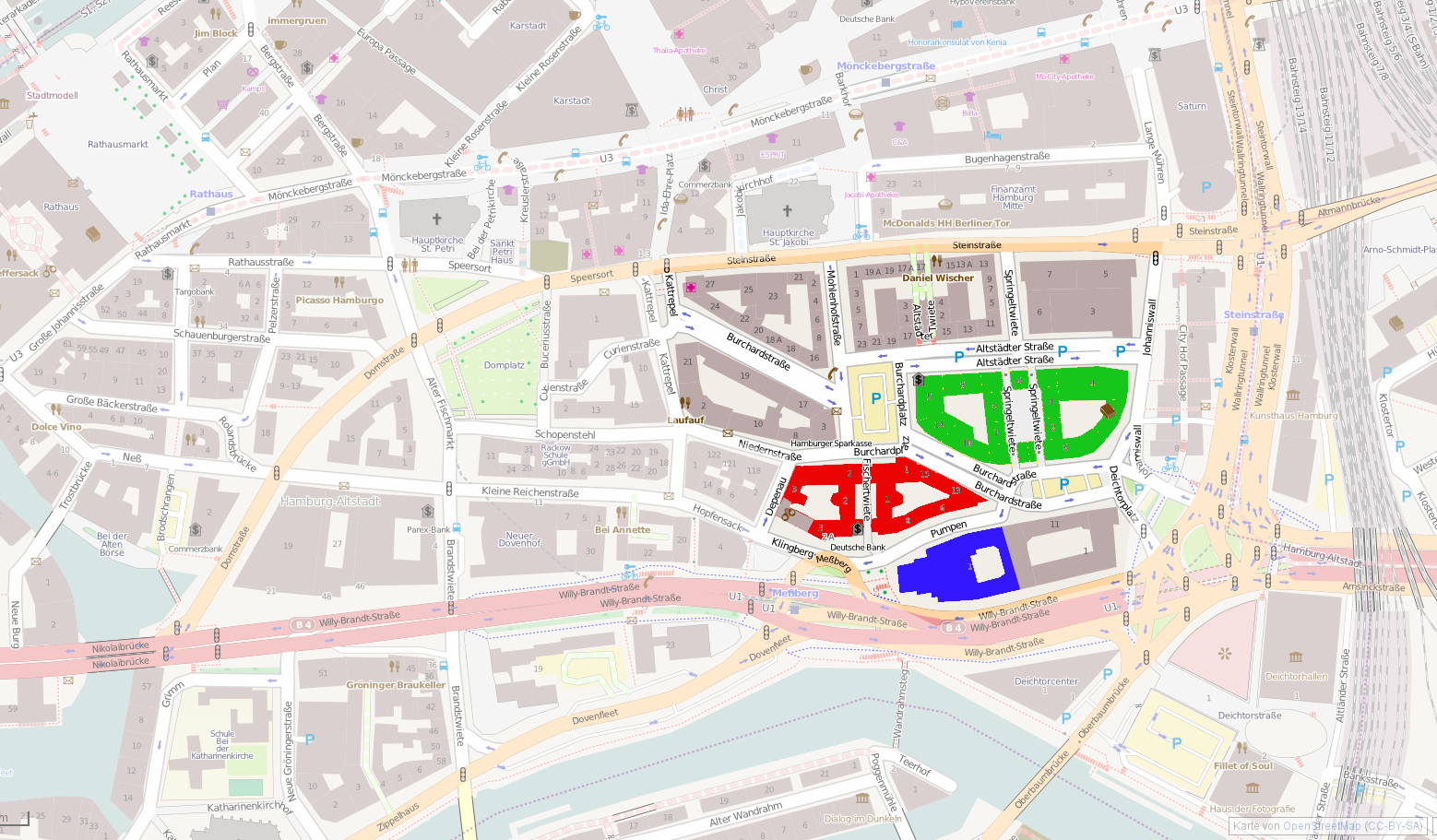
Location of the Sprinkenhof (green) within the Kontorhaus District

== See also ==
- Chilehaus
- World Heritage Site Kontorhaus District
