= Kontorhaus District =

Heritage site in Hamburg, Germany

UNESCO World Heritage Site
- Location within Germany Location within Hamburg
- Criteria: Cultural: iv
- Reference: 1467
- Inscription: 2015 (39th Session)
- Area: 26.08 ha (64.4 acres)
- Buffer zone: 56.17 ha (138.8 acres)
- Coordinates: 53°32′44″N 9°59′58″E

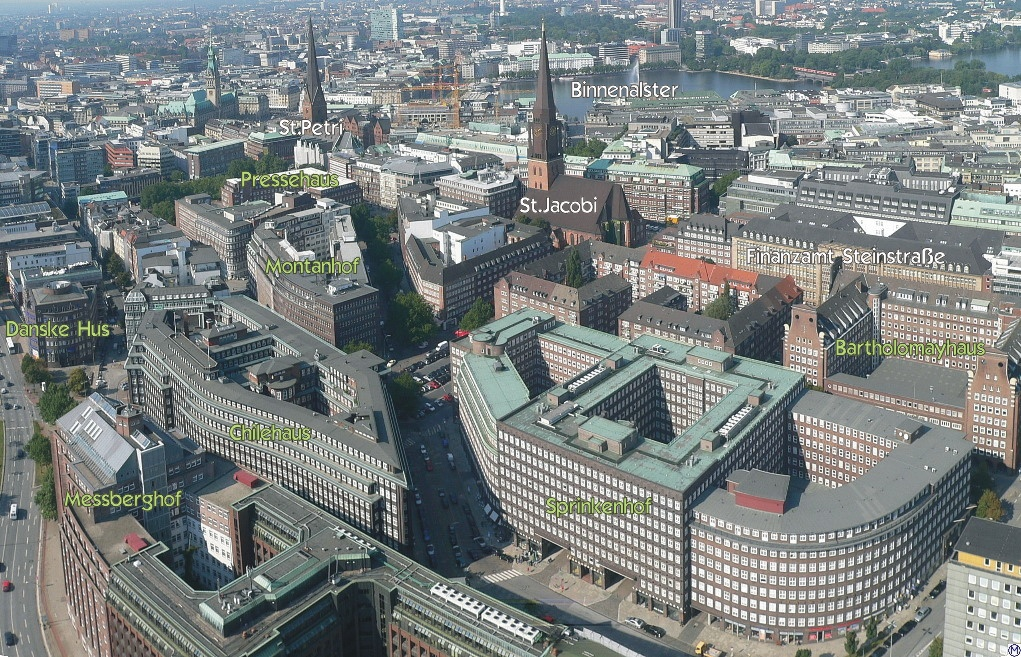
Aerial view of the Kontorhaus District

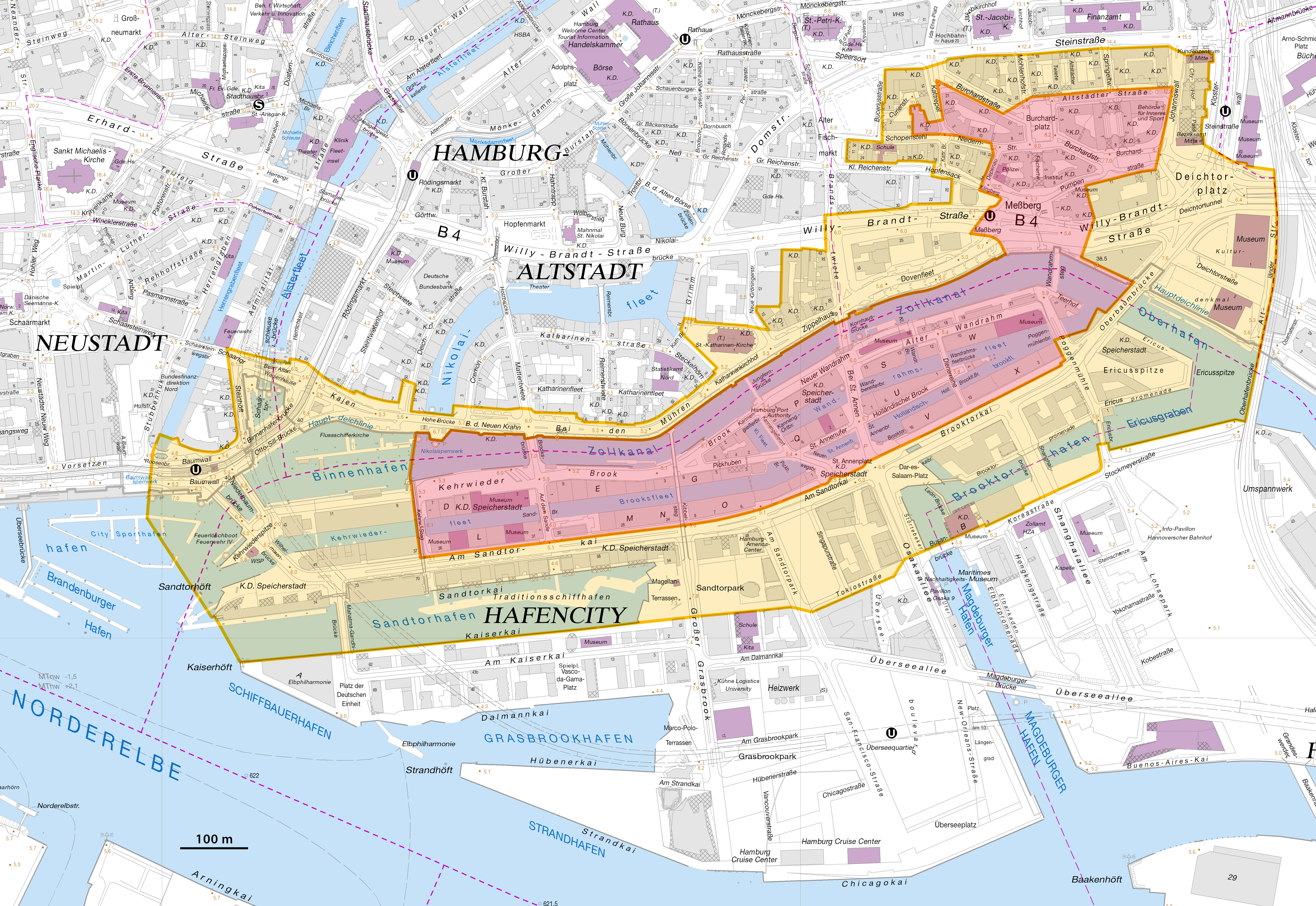
Map of Speicherstadt and Kontorhaus District

The Kontorhaus District is the southeastern part of Altstadt, Hamburg, between Steinstraße, Meßberg, Klosterwall and Brandstwiete. The streetscape is characterised by large office buildings in the style of Brick Expressionism of the early 20th century.

Since 5 July 2015, parts of the Kontorhaus district and the adjacent Speicherstadt district have been UNESCO World Heritage Sites.

== Historical background ==
Since the 17th century, the area has been densely built-up; the result was a so-called Gängeviertel ("corridor quarter") with many narrow alleys. The density of the buildings increased even more when there was a housing shortage after the Hamburg fire in 1842. In 1892, a cholera epidemic broke out and the poor hygienic conditions in the neighbourhood caused the disease to spread dramatically – it was then decided to redevelop the area. As a result, many inhabitants were resettled.

Fritz Schumacher, who had been Director of Construction and Head of Building Construction since 1909 prevailed in the replanning of the site; the increasing space requirements of the up-and-coming Hamburg merchants were to be met with the construction of large Kontorhouses, although a partial use as living space was also initially envisaged. The Burchardplatz forms the centre of the complex planned by Schumacher.

== Architecture ==
The buildings were mainly made of reinforced concrete skeleton construction. The new buildings were to be individually designed. Characteristic features are clinker brick facades and copper roofs. In order to make the street canyons more open at the top, the upper floors are often set back from the main front of the house. Decorative elements on the facade are also made of clinker brick; in addition, elements (often sculptures) of ceramics were used for the design, most of which have a connection to Hamburg trade and crafts.

== Notable buildings ==
One of the most famous and architecturally pioneering buildings, the Chilehaus, was designed by the architect Fritz Höger and built between 1922 and 1924. It owes its name to its owner, the shipowner Henry B. Sloman, who owed his fortune to trade with Chile-saltpeter. The building is considered the main work of the architect and one of the most important buildings of clinker brick expressionism.

The Miramar-House, the first completed building of the Kontorhaus District, was built in 1921/22 for the trading company Miramar. The design came from the architect Max Bach. In addition to hints of clinker brick expressionism, one of the most outstanding stylistic elements is the rounded corner of the house. Also well known are the sculptures by Richard Kuöhl in the entrance area, which represent the most important professional branches of the flourishing Hamburg economy.

The Sprinkenhof was built between 1927 and 1943 according to designs by architects Hans and Oskar Gerson and Fritz Höger. The building enclosing three inner courtyards was Hamburg's largest office complex at the time. The Sprinkenhof was one of the buildings whose design originally included apartments, but which were ultimately not realized. The decorative elements on the facade were designed by Ludwig Kunstmann.

Between 1924 and 1926 an office building for the company Dobbertin & Co. and the Reederei Komrowski was built according to the plans of the architects Distel und Grubitz. The Montanhof is characterised by the typical – and in this case repeatedly – recessed upper floors. The facade of the clinker brick building is decorated with numerous Art Deco decorations.

Hans and Oskar Gerson designed another building in the quarter, the Meßberghof. In cooperation with Fritz Wischer, Max Bach built the "Hubertushaus" office building. Two other buildings, the Altstädter Hof and the Bartholomayhaus were designed by Rudolf Klophaus. The fictitious gable of the Bartholomayhaus, a reminiscence of the old Hanseatic town houses, was already considered obsolete at the time of its construction. The sandstone sculptures at the Altstädter Hof were also designed by Richard Kuöhl, who also designed the larger-than-life Hermes sculpture at the main entrance of the "Mohlenhof", one of the few office buildings that survived the Second World War almost unscathed. Several publishers were based in the Pressehaus (press house), today Helmut-Schmidt-Haus – another work by Klophaus.

Two formative buildings were already built before Schumacher's redesign of the quarter: the house at Schopenstehl 32, a house originally built in 1780 with a rococo portal, which was integrated into a new building by Arthur Viol in 1885–1888; and the police station at Klingberg, which directly adjoins the Chile House. New buildings such as the "Danske Hus" and the "Neue Dovenhof", which were built in the 1990s, follow the style of the existing clinker brick buildings.

== Gallery ==
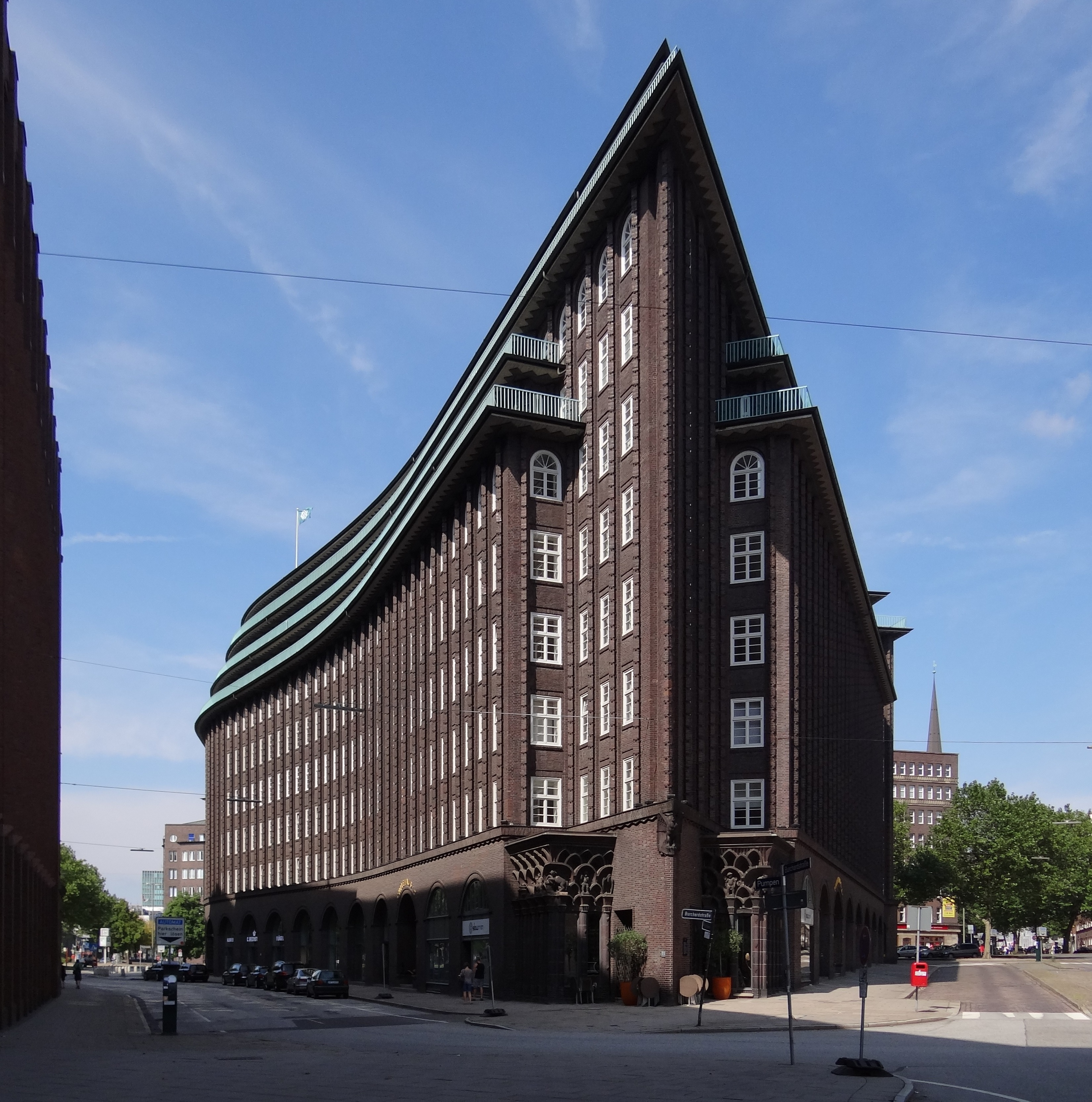
Chilehaus

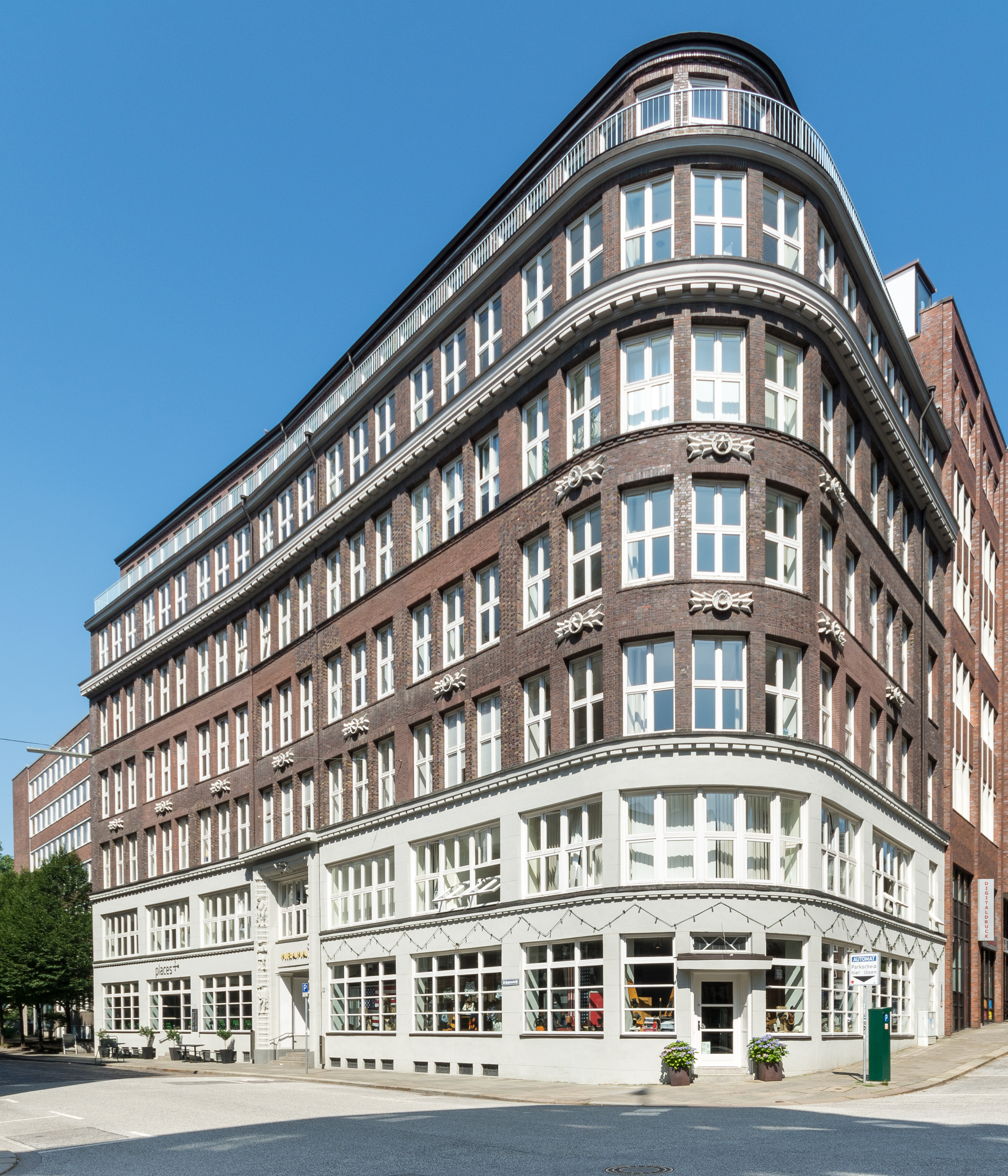
Miramarhaus

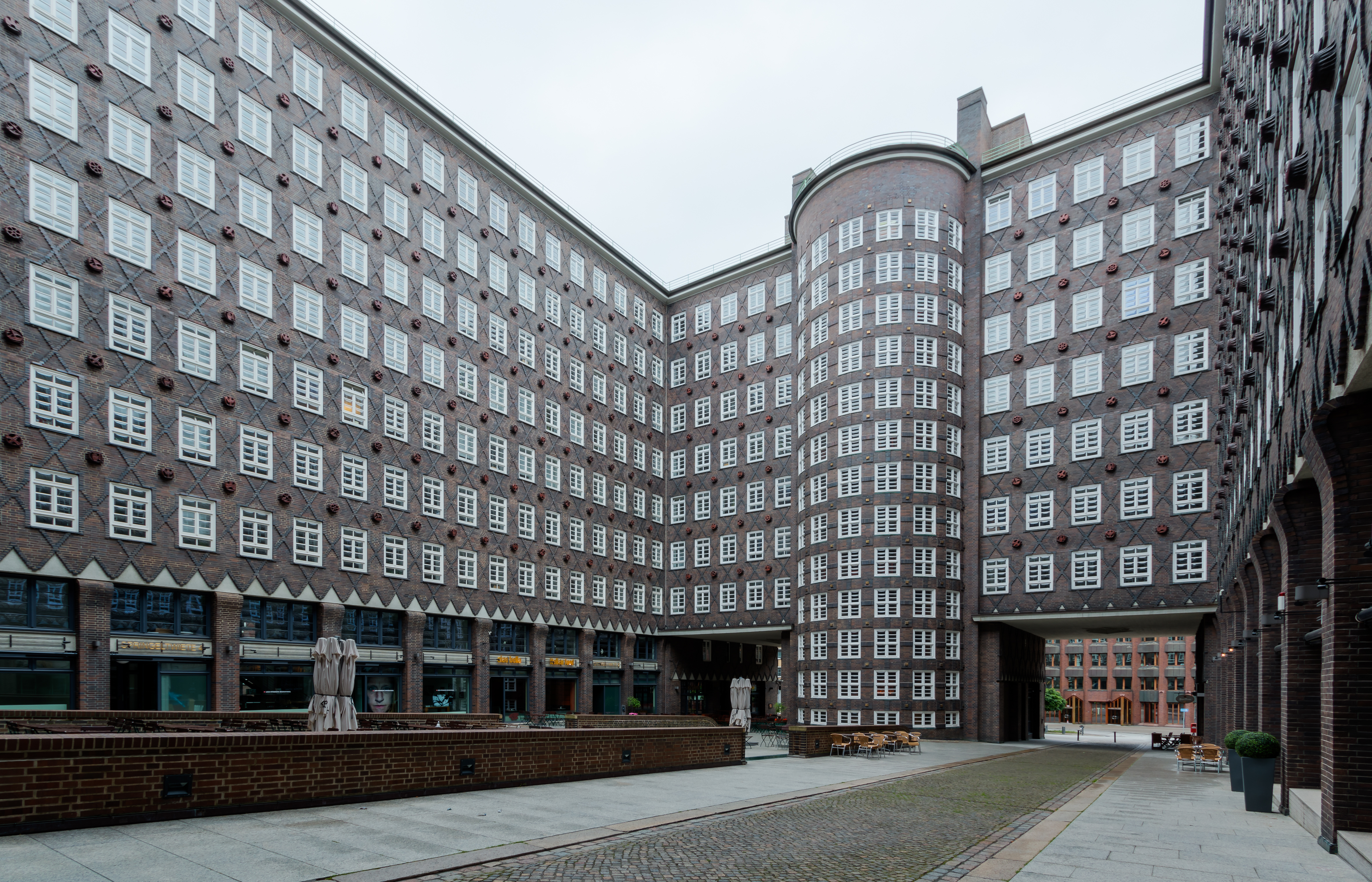
Sprinkenhof

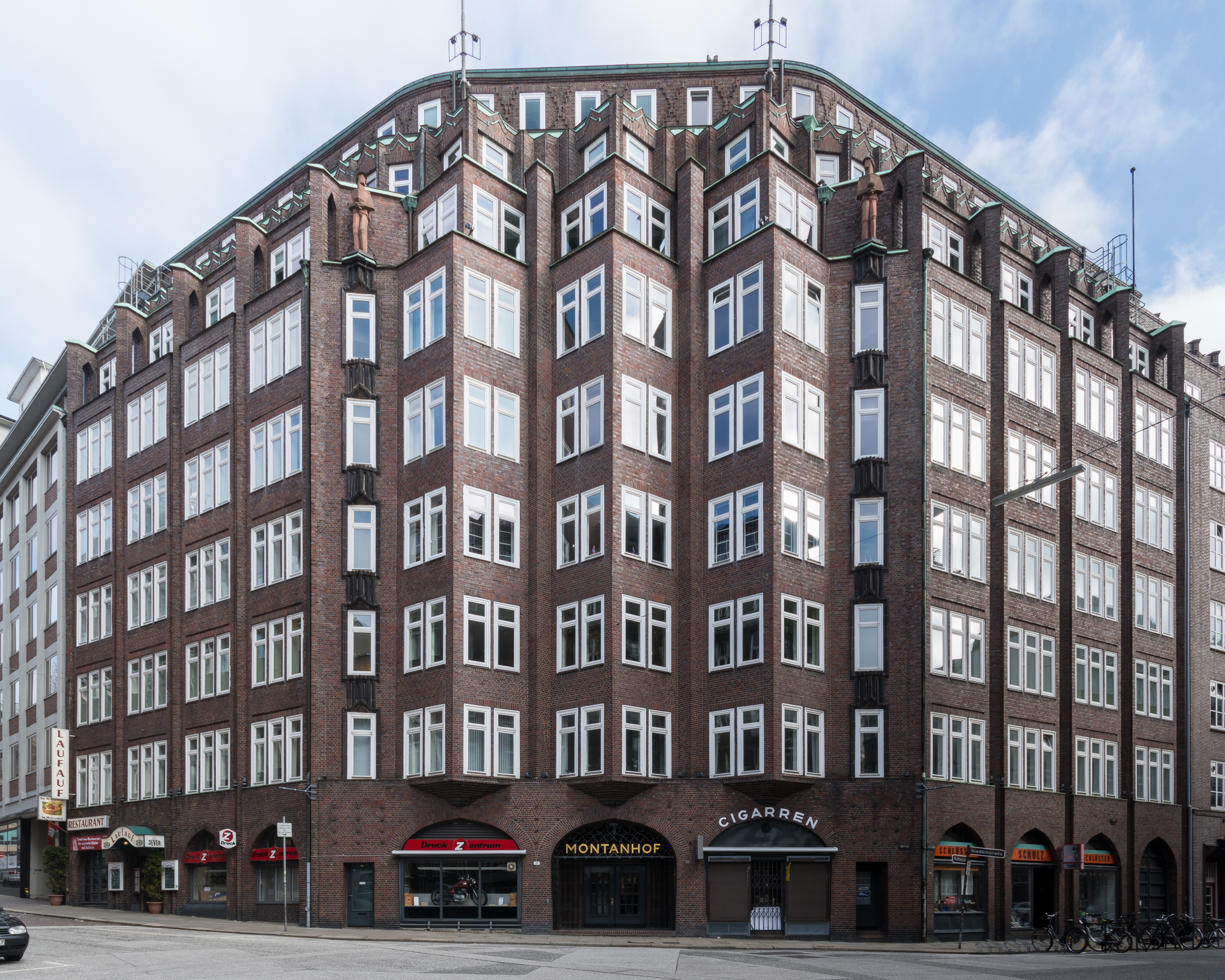
Montanhof

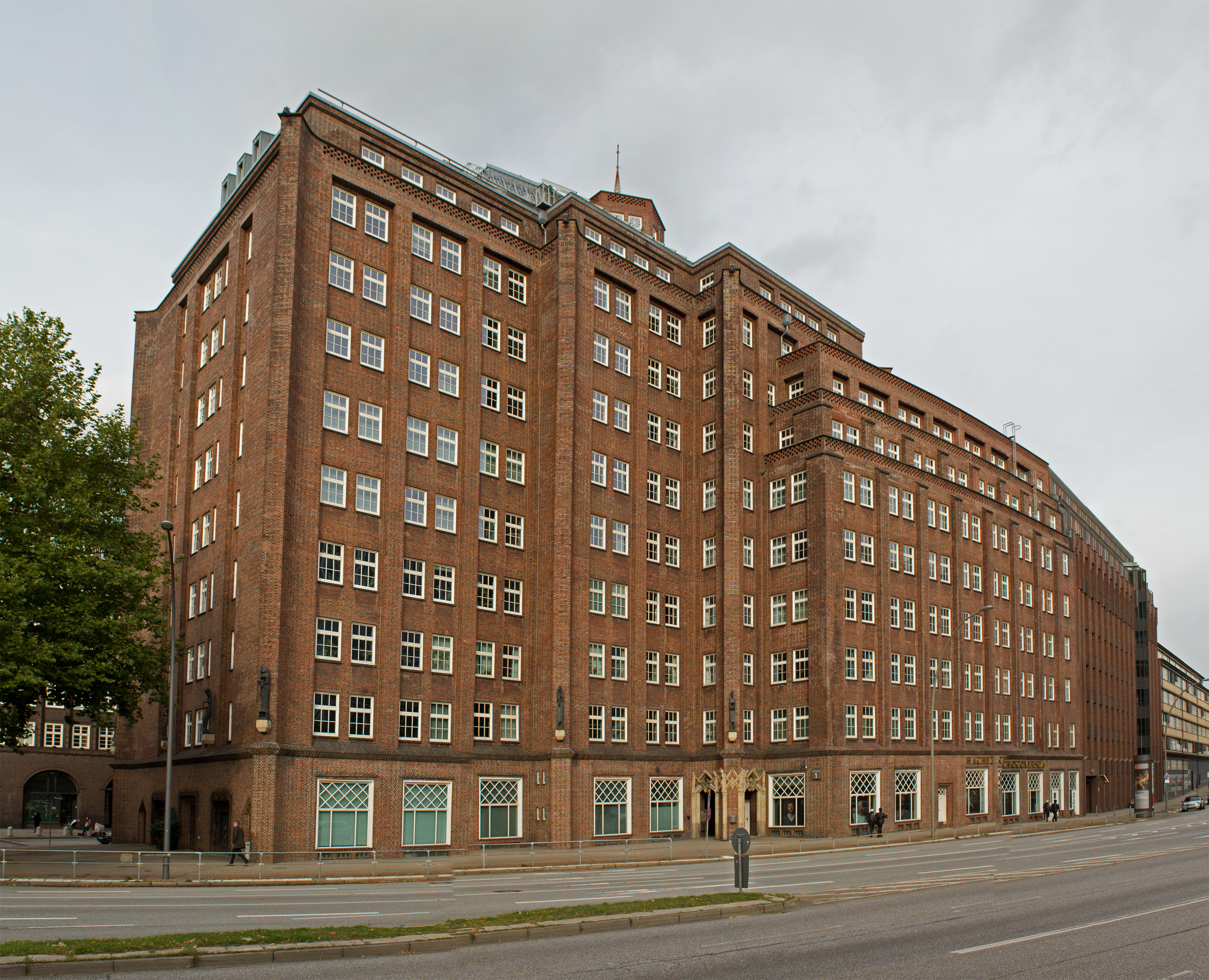
Meßberghof

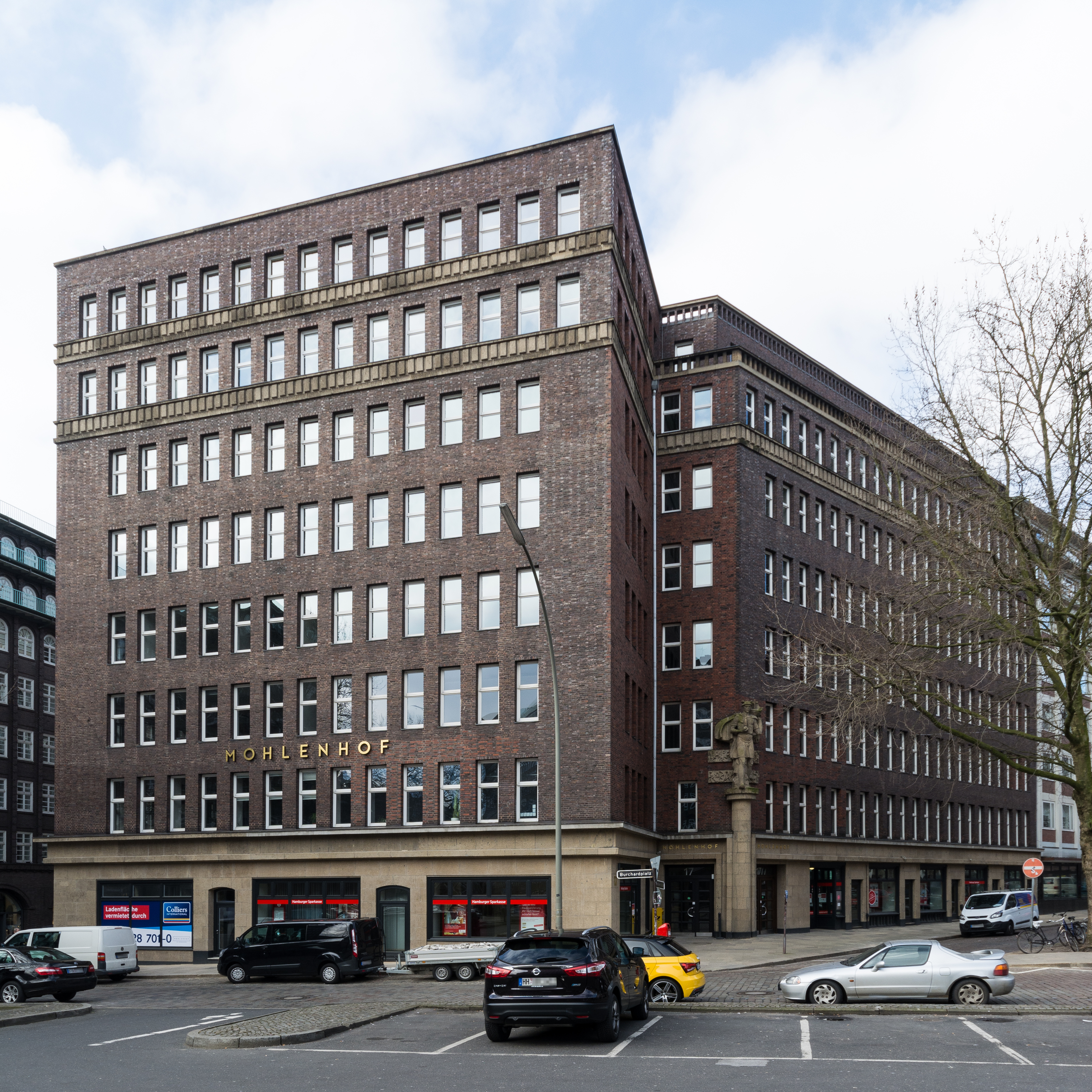
Mohlenhof

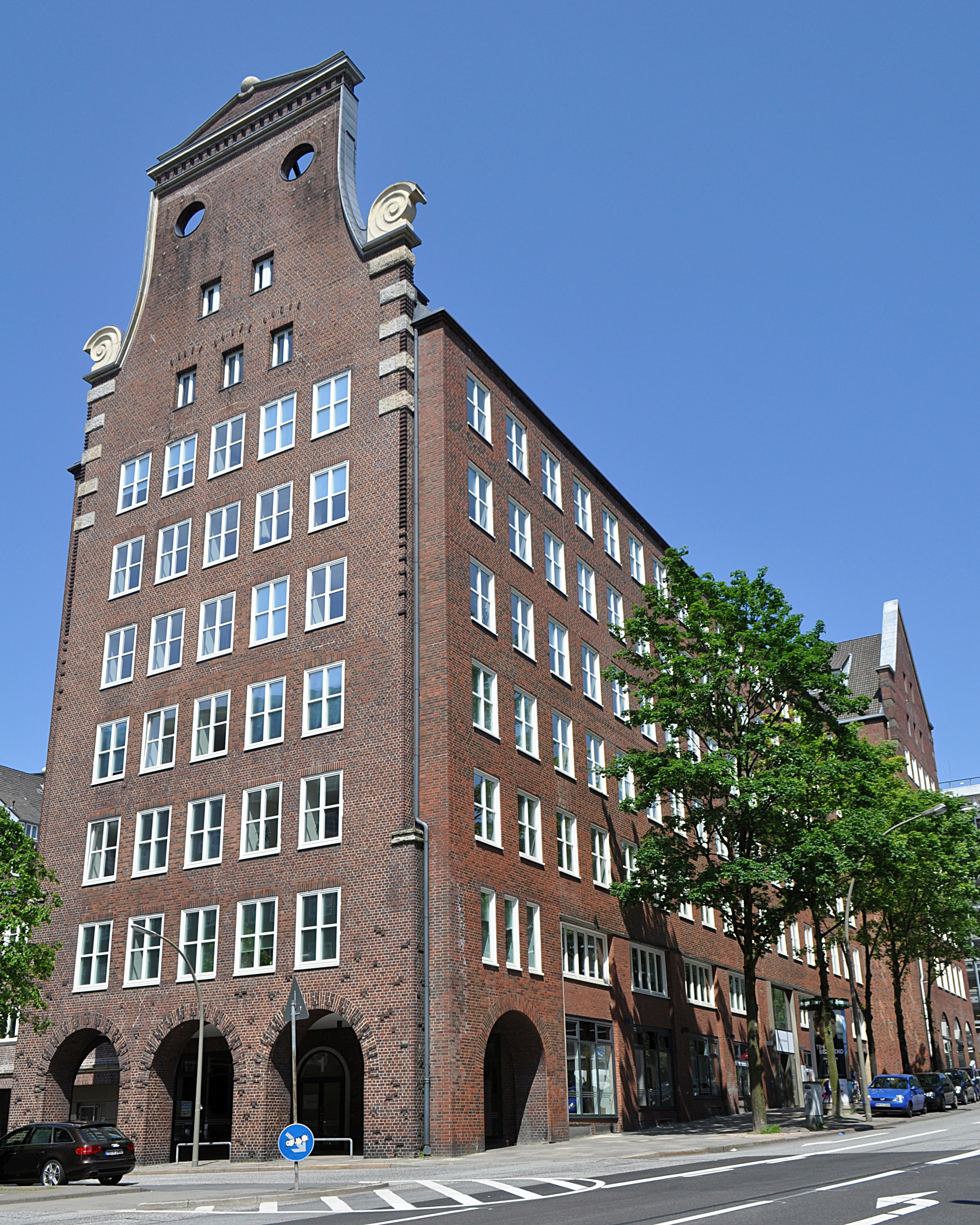
Bartholomayhaus

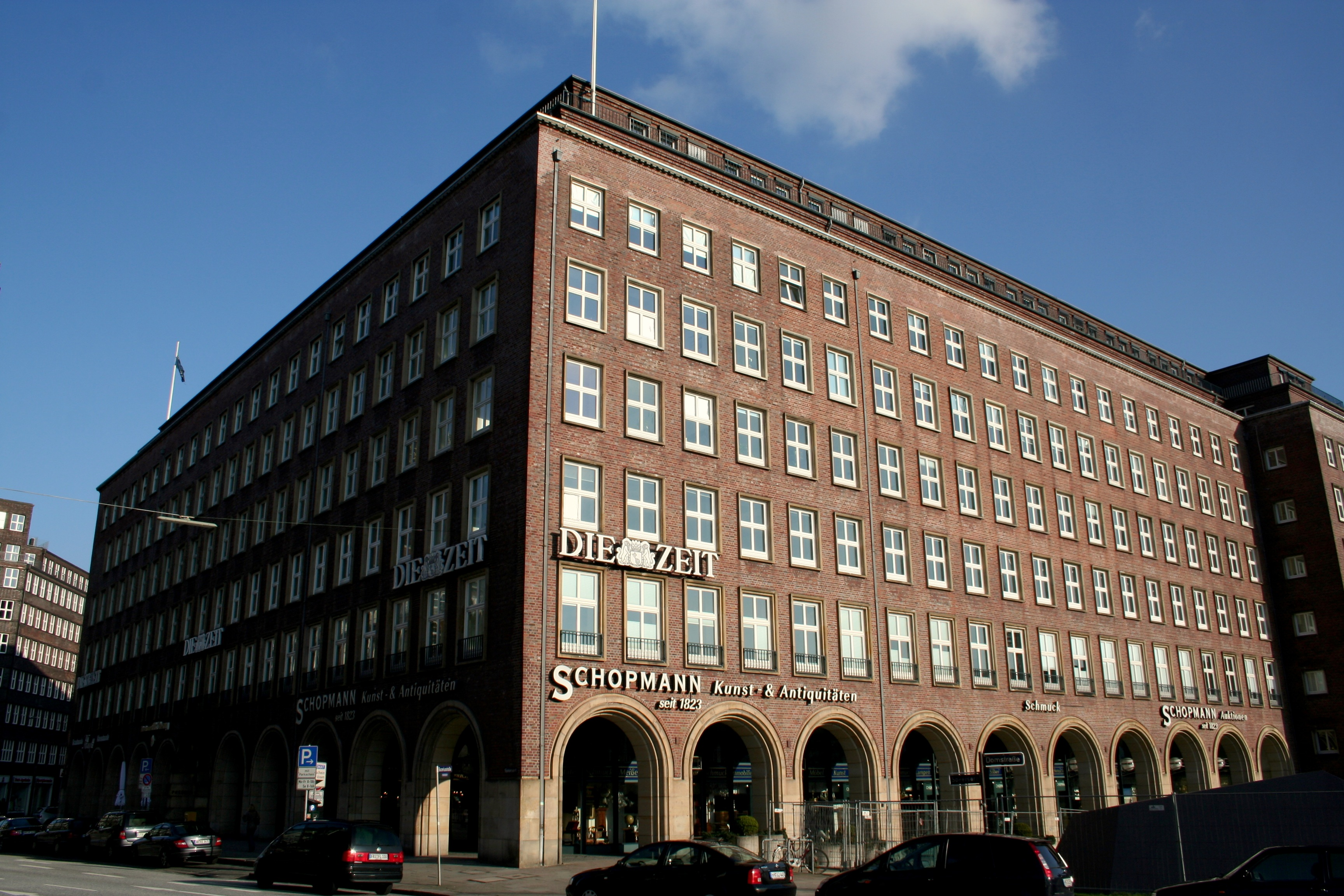
Helmut-Schmidt-Haus

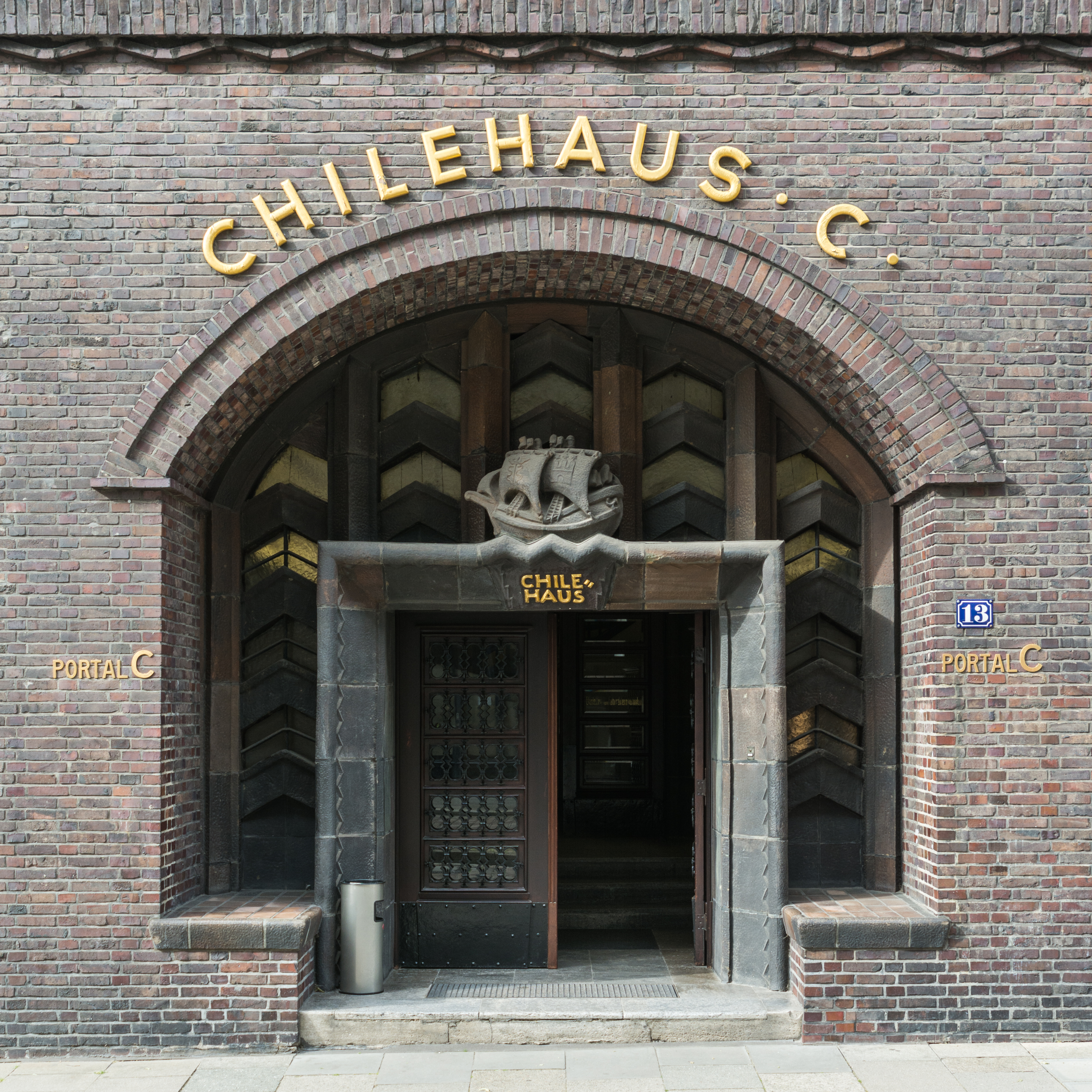
Chilehaus detail

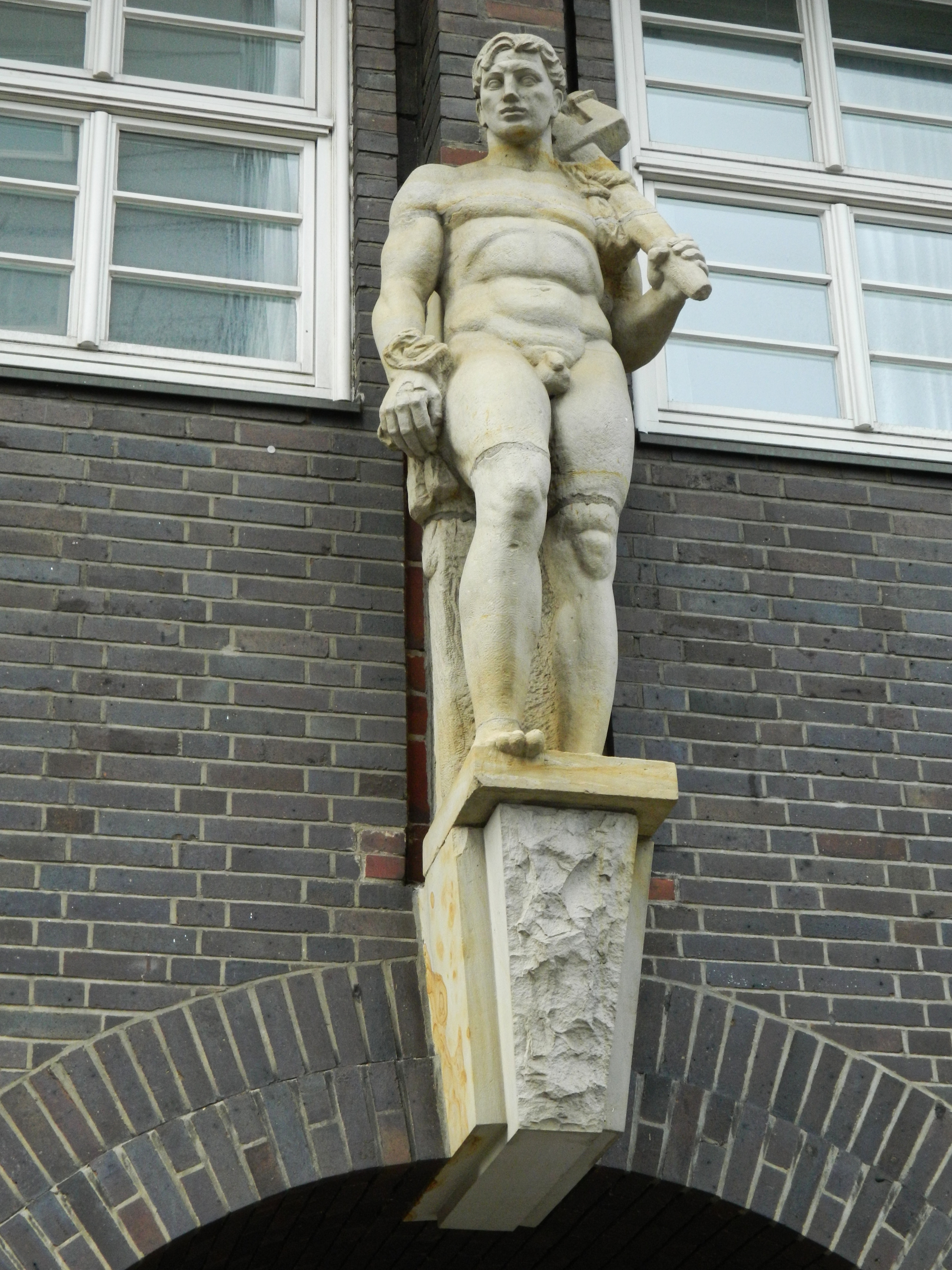
Sprinkenhof detail

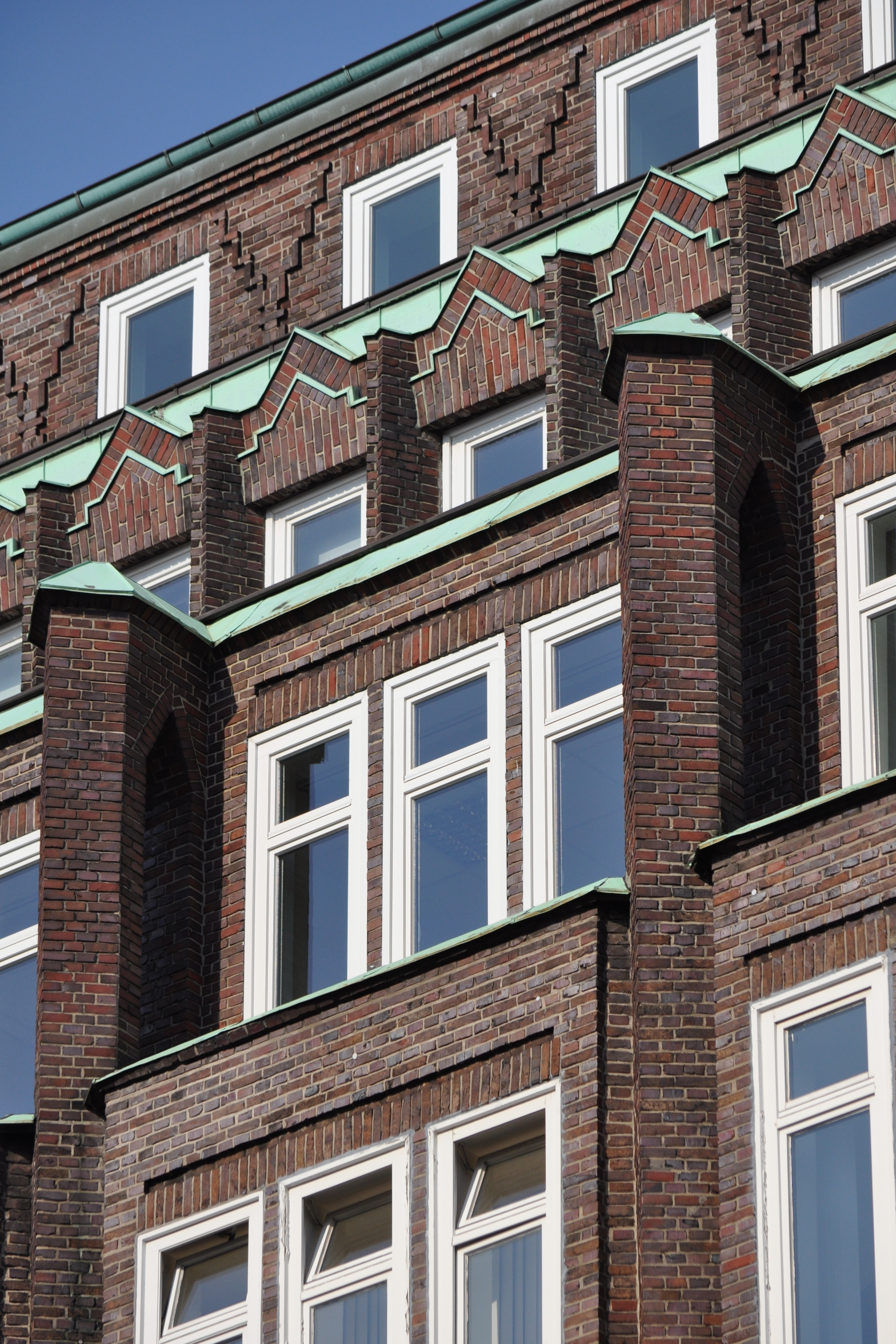
Montanhof detail

== Listed buildings and UNESCO World Heritage Site ==
Most of the buildings in the Kontohausviertel are listed buildings. At the 39th meeting of the UNESCO World Heritage Committee in Bonn on 5 July 2015, the Kontorhausviertel and the Speicherstadt were added to the list of World Heritage Sites.

== Literature ==
- Ralf Lange: Das Hamburger Kontorhaus: Architektur Geschichte Denkmal (Hamburger Kontor Houses: Architecture History Monument). Dölling und Galitz, Hamburg 2015 (in German)
- Hermann Hipp, Hans Meyer-Veden: Hamburger Kontorhäuser. (Hamburger Kontor Houses) Ernst, Berlin 1988, ISBN 3-433-02043-4 (in German)
- Rita Bake: Verschiedene Welten I. 45 historische Stationen durch das Kontorhausviertel (Different worlds I. 45 historical stations through the Kontorhaus district). Landeszentrale für politische Bildung (Agency for Civic Education), Hamburg, 2010 (in German)

== See also ==
- List of World Heritage Sites in Germany
