= Miramar-Haus =

Historic building in Hamburg

Coordinates: 53.54901°N 9.99908°E

The Miramar House is a historic Kontorhaus in Hamburg, built in the style of Brick Expressionism of the 1920s. It is located in the Hamburg-Altstadt district. The house has been a listed building since 1999. It is part of the UNESCO World Heritage Site Kontorhaus District.

The ground plan of the building adapts to the Schopenstehl and Kattrepel streets, which run at a slightly acute angle. The rounding off of the building towards the street corner was unusual for the time and became stylistically influential for many of the following buildings. The four upper floors were built in clinker brickwork. The two plinth floors are plastered. The house is divided horizontally by several cornices. The figures are by Richard Kuöhl. They represent typical professions on which the Hamburg economy is based.

== Gallery ==
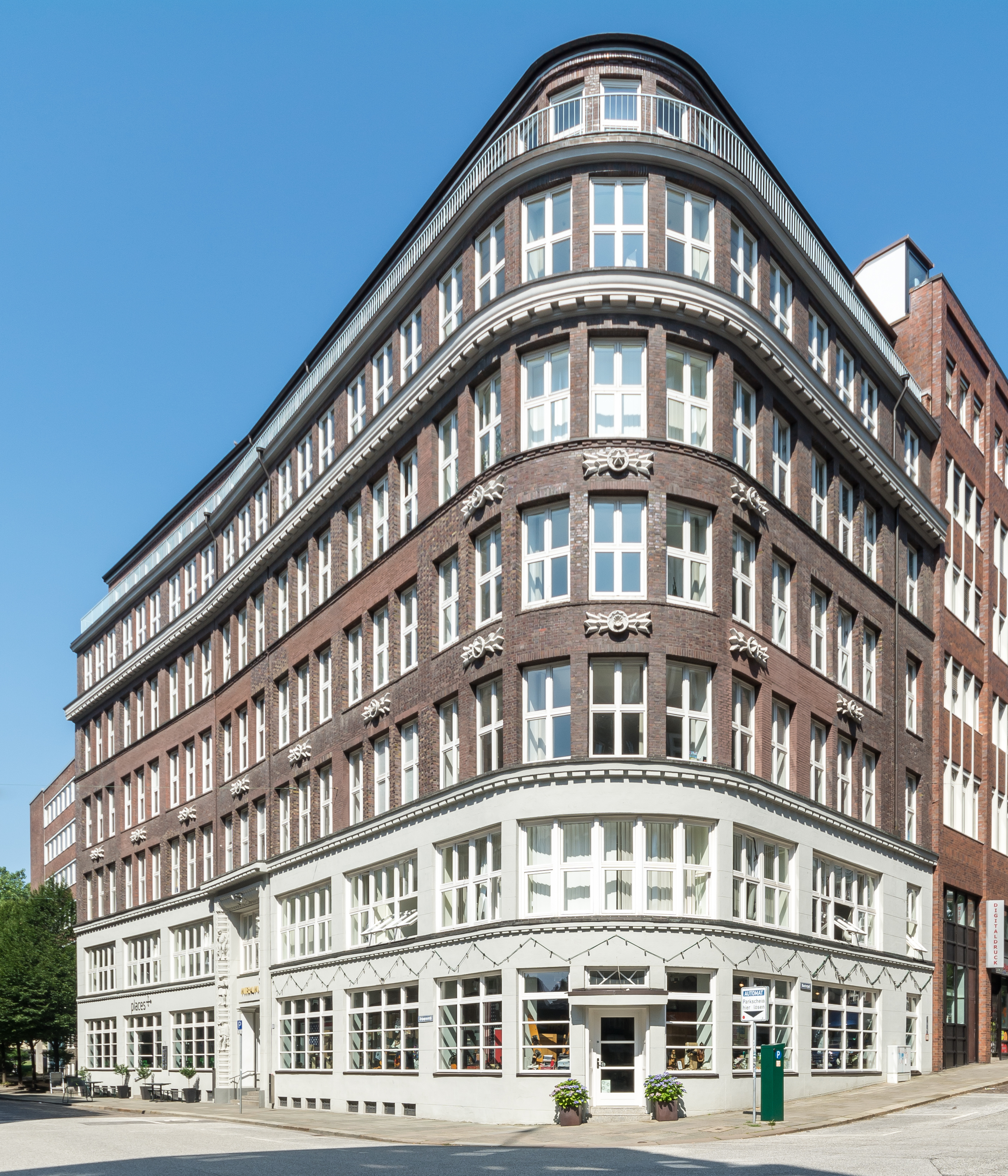
Miramar-House

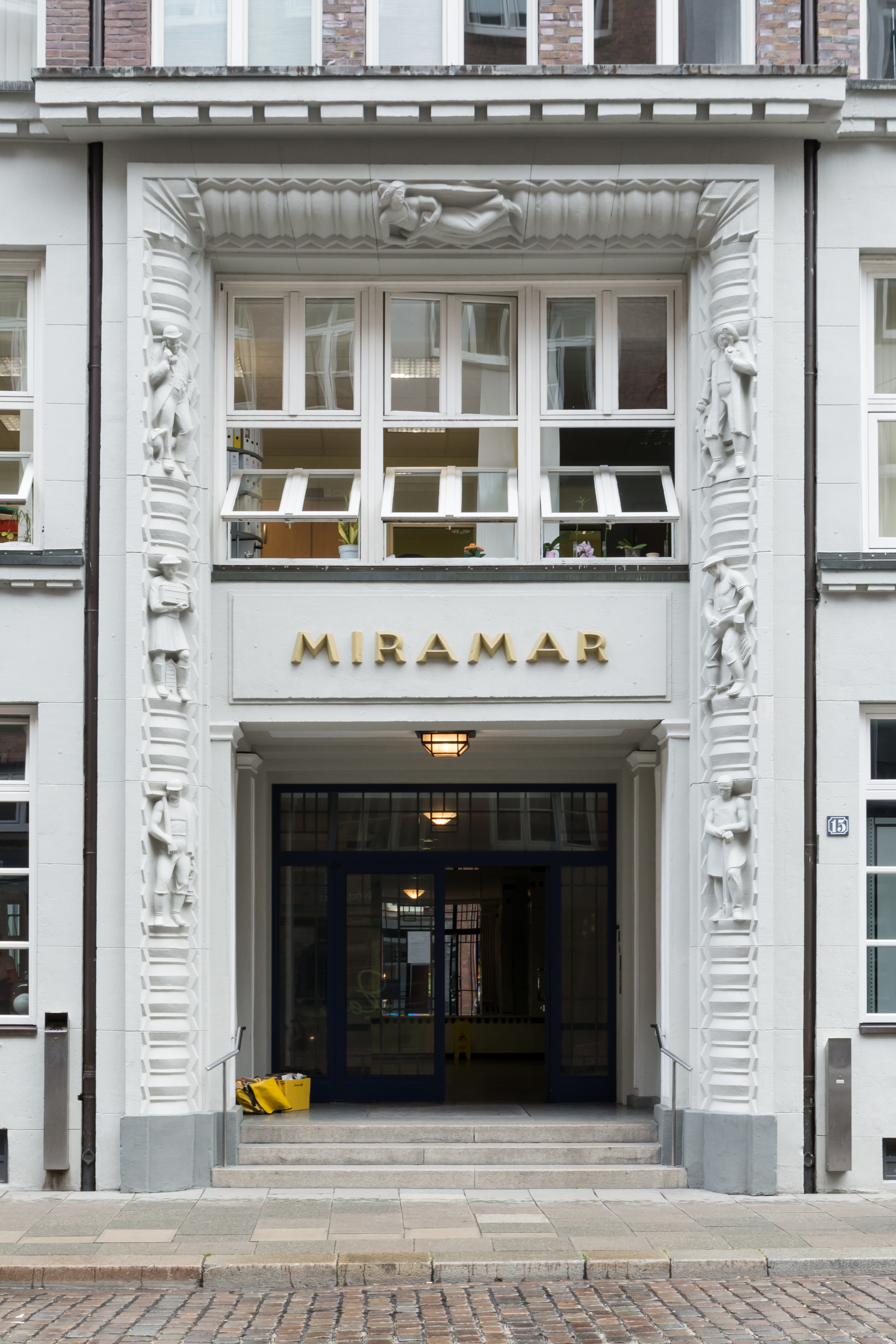
Main entrance

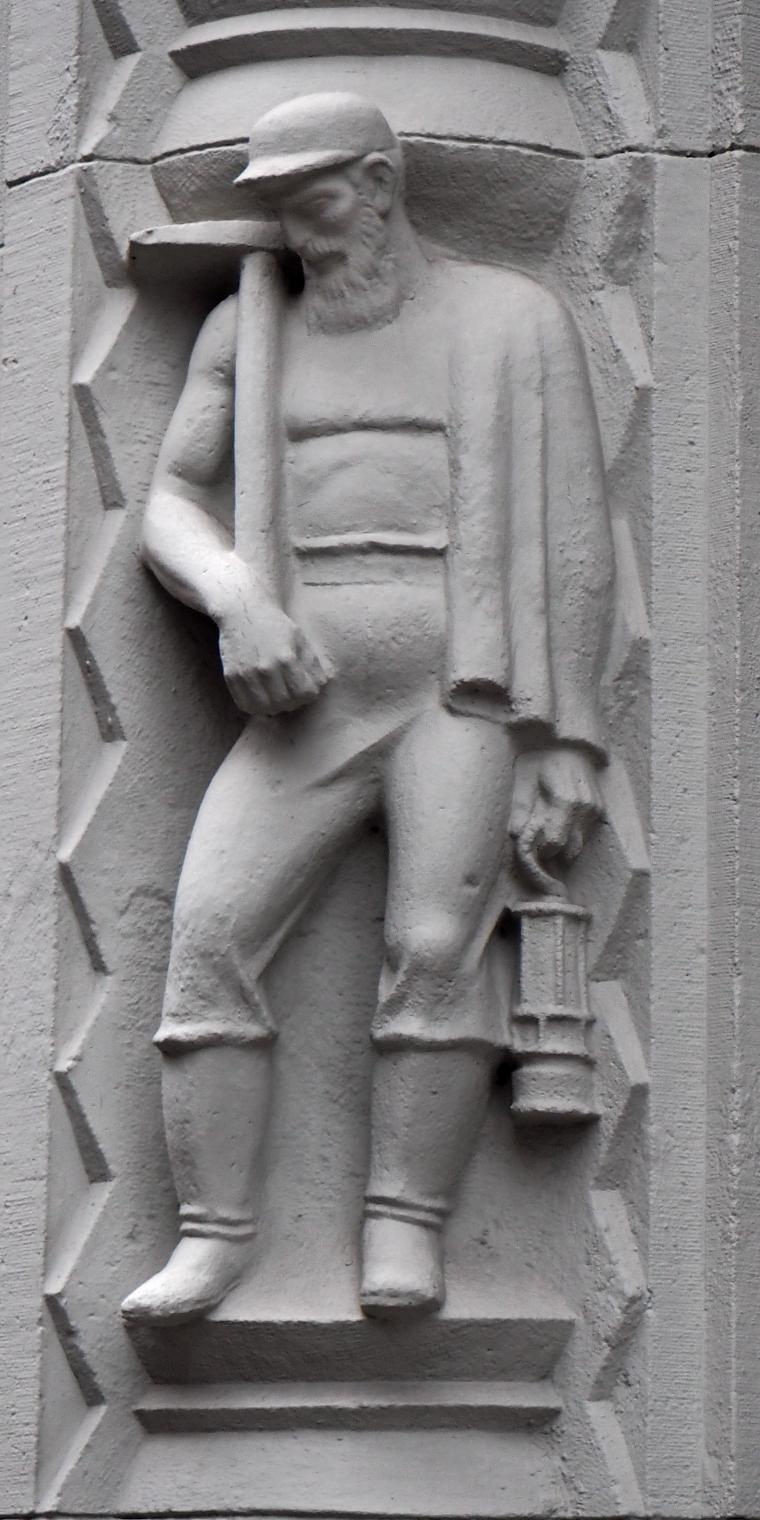
Mine worker

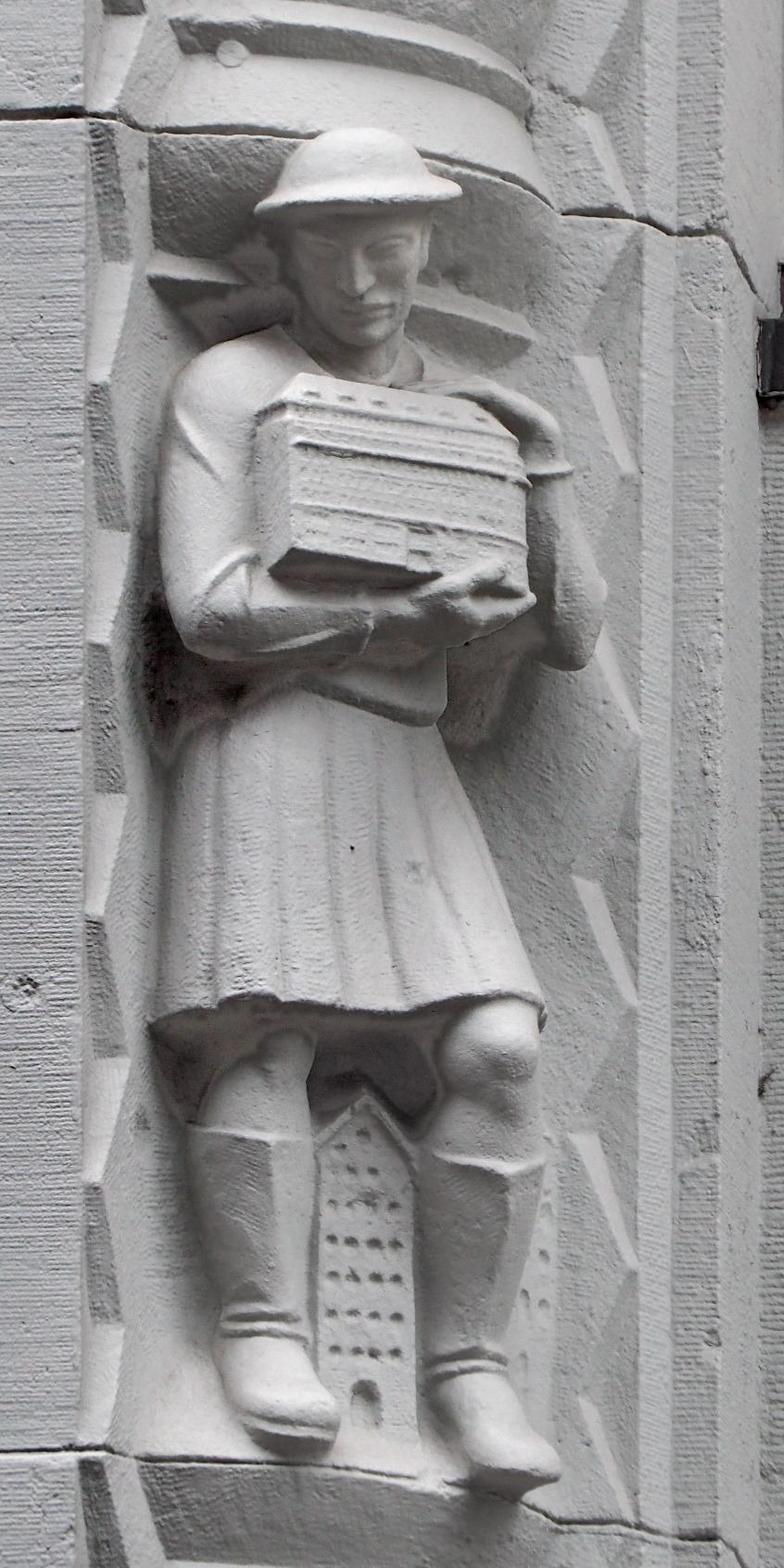
Architect

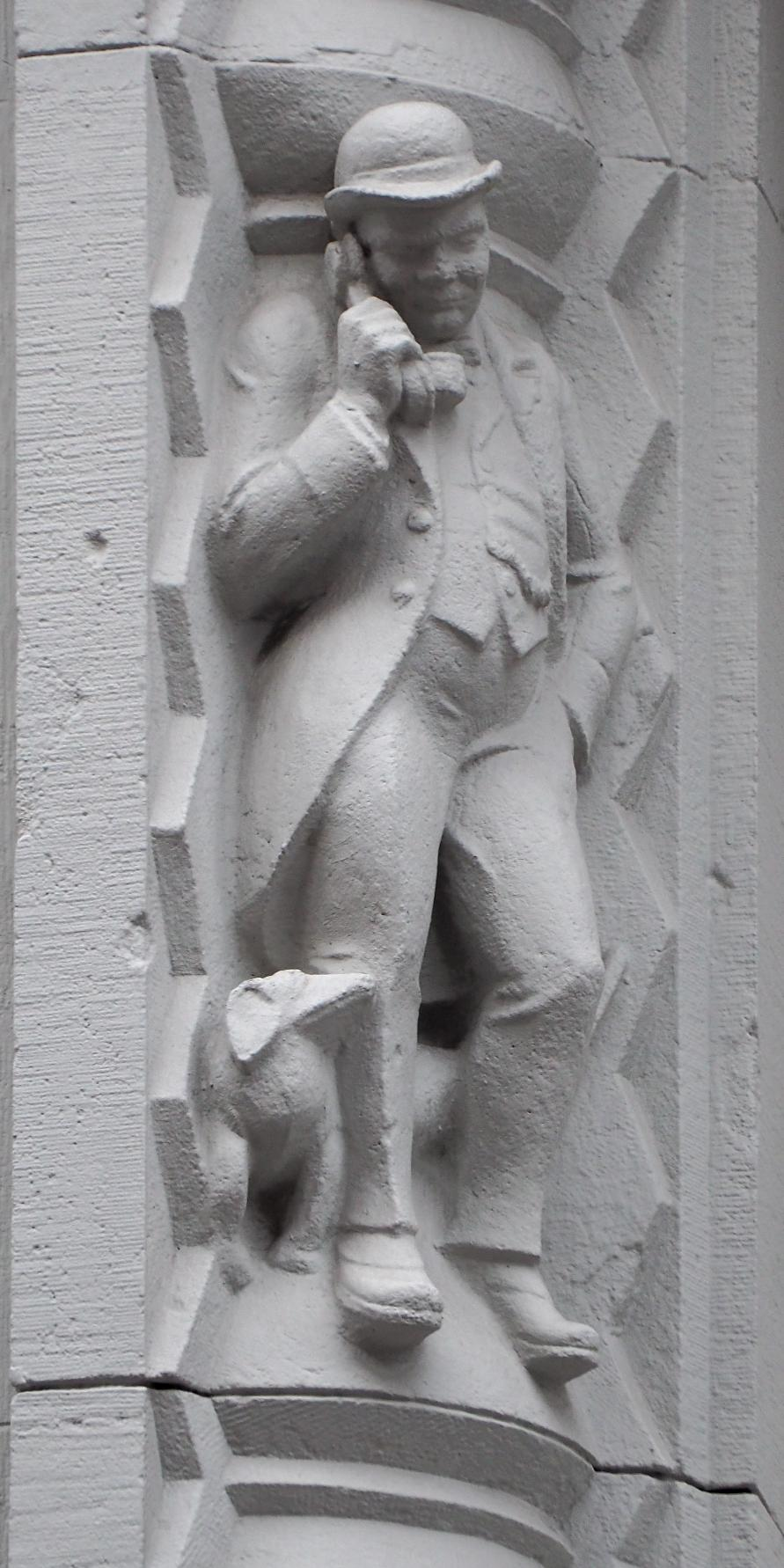
Merchant

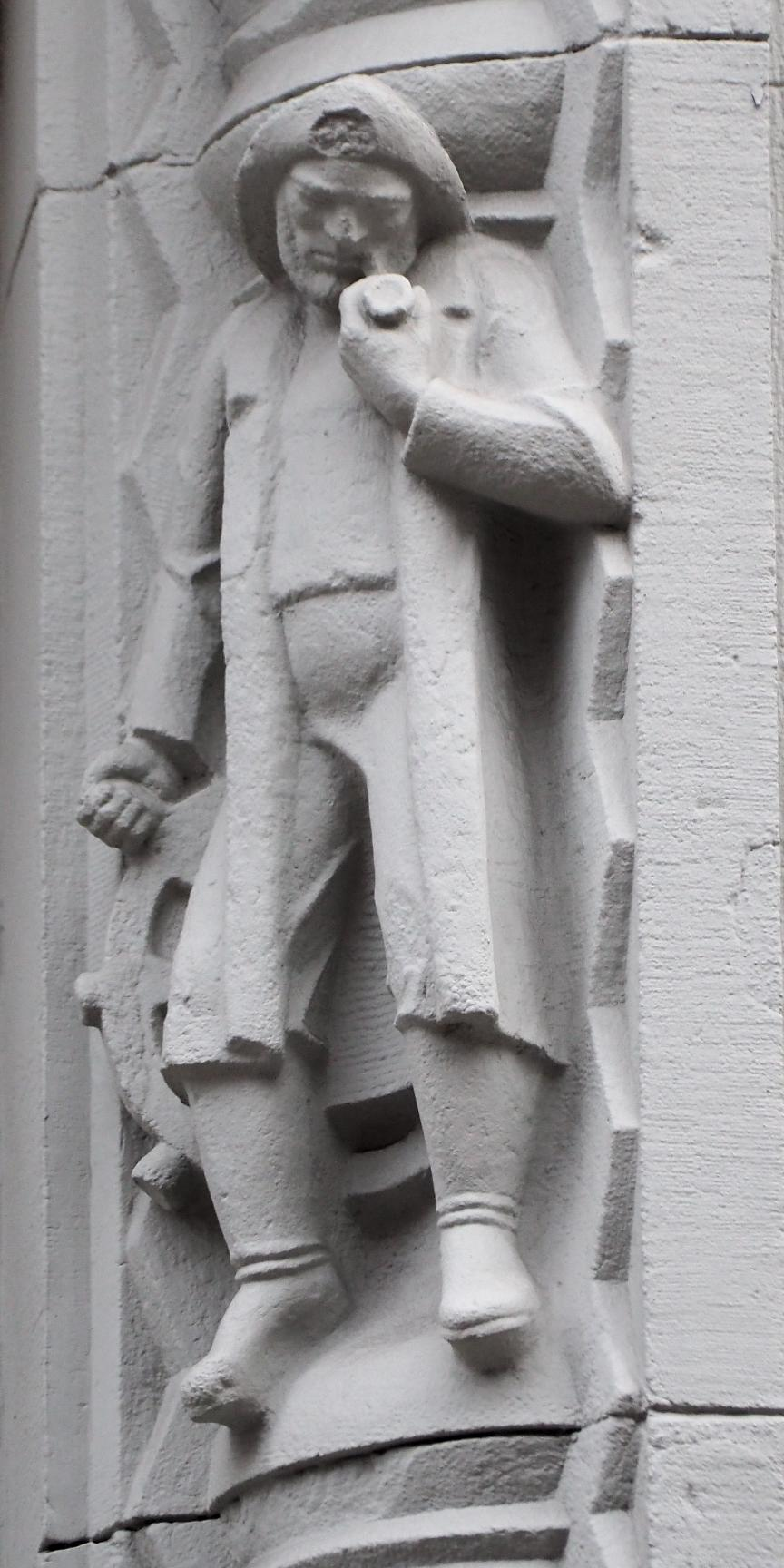
Sailor

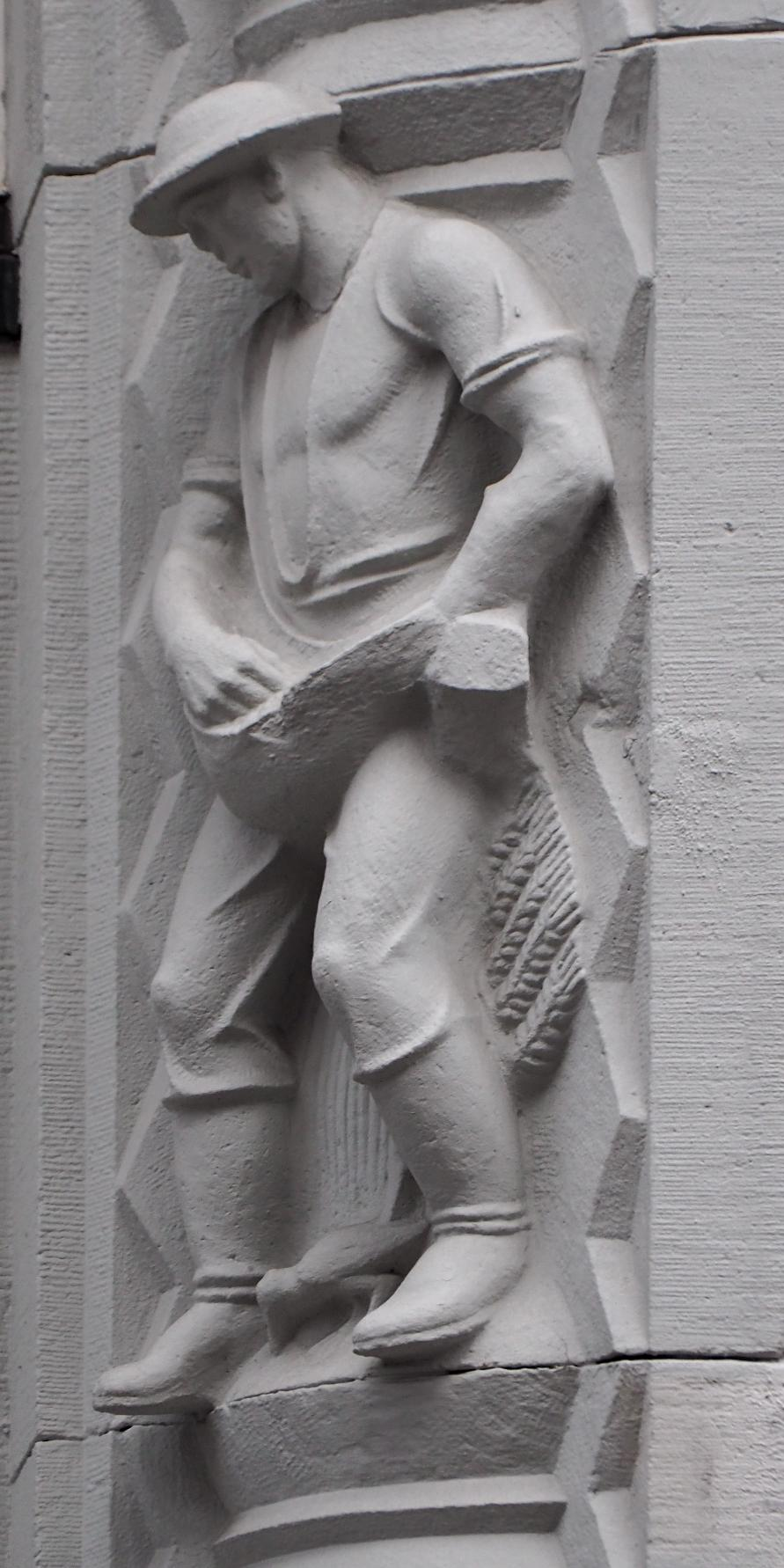
Farmer

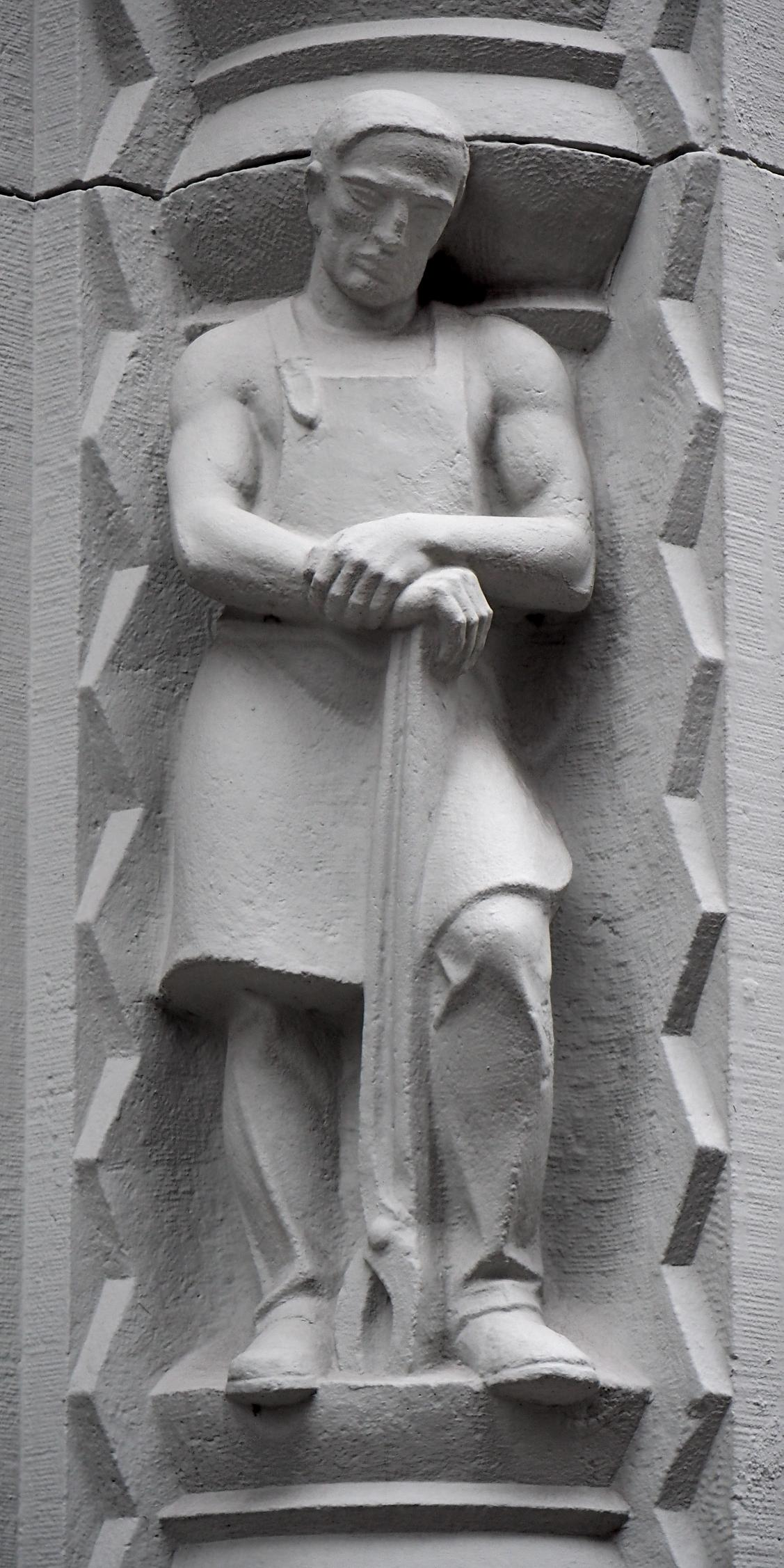
Steel worker
