= Stadttheater Minden =

Theatre in Minden, Germany

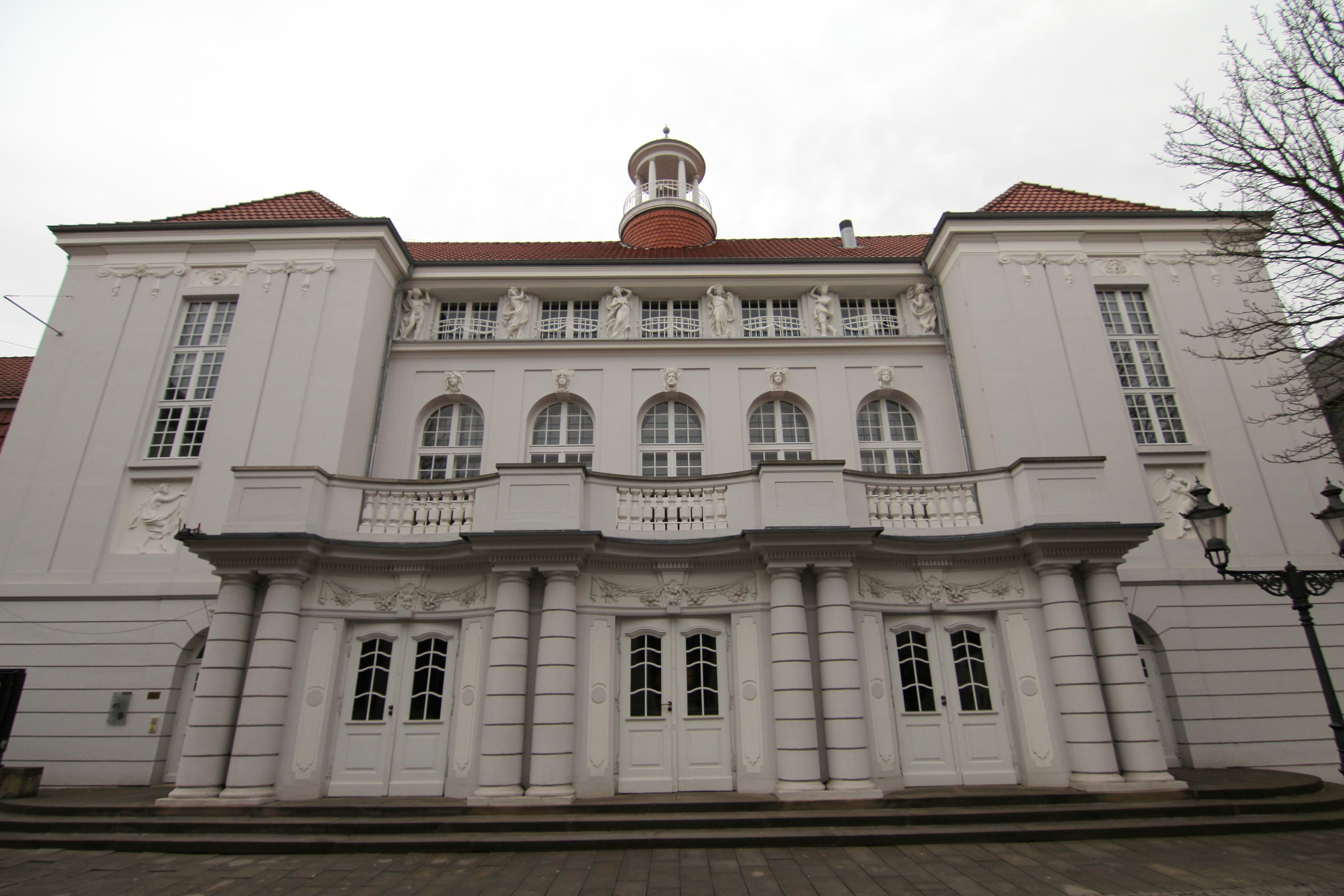

General information
- Architectural style: Baroque Revival
- Location: Minden, North Rhine-Westphalia, Germany
- Coordinates: 52°17′15″N 8°55′08″E
- Construction started: 1906
- Opened: 1 October 1908

Design and construction
- Architects: August Kersten; Paul Kanold

Website
- stadttheater-minden.de

Stadttheater Minden is a municipal theatre in Minden, North Rhine-Westphalia, Germany. The theatre has no ensemble, but stages some productions of its own. It became known for a Wagner project culminating in Der Ring in Minden.

== History ==
The building was erected from 1906 to 1908 in Baroque Revival style, on a design by the architects August Kersten (Minden) and Paul Kanold (Berlin). It seats 568 people. The theatre was opened on 1 October 1908 with a performance of Goethe's play Iphigenie auf Tauris.

The theatre has no ensemble, but stages some productions of its own. It is also used by guest ensembles and touring theatre groups, and serves as a concert hall for symphony concert series of the Nordwestdeutsche Philharmonie, and for other events.

In September 1998, to mark the 1200th anniversary of the town, the chamber opera Friedrich und Katte by Wolfgang Knuth (born 1959) was composed and premiered at the theatre.

In 1999, a project to show operas by Richard Wagner was begun by the Richard-Wagner-Verband Minden, the theatre and the Nordwestdeutsche Philharmonie. The first work presented was in 2002 Der fliegende Holländer, followed by Tannhäuser in 2005, staged by Keith Warner and conducted by Frank Beermann. Lohengrin was performed in 2009. The project of 2012 was Tristan und Isolde, staged by Matthias von Stegmann; Beermann conducted, with the title roles performed by Andreas Schager and Dara Hobbs. A production of Der Ring des Nibelungen opened in 2015 with Das Rheingold, followed a year later by Die Walküre. The Wagner project has received international recognition.

In 2014 the theatre began a professional project for young people (Jugendtheaterprojekt) with Romeo und Julia – Out With Love based on Shakespeare's Romeo and Juliet in the Shakespeare-year 2014. In a joint venture with the school Kurt-Tucholsky-Gesamtschule, the intendant Andrea Krauledat and the theatre pedagogue Viola Schneider staged the production, performed in the theatre hall. The following season, the project was continued by Schiller's Die Räuber in collaboration with the Ratsgymnasium Minden, again directed by Krauledat and Schneider, and Moritz Rinke's Die Nibelungen, in collaboration with the youth club t3.

== Wagner project ==
Beginning in 2002, stage works by Wagner were produced at the theatre, initiated by Jutta Hering-Winckler, president of the local Richard Wagner Society. The orchestra was the Nordwestdeutsche Philharmonie, conducted by Frank Beermann. The performances were reviewed internationally. Reviews by Eleonore Büning in the Frankfurter Allgemeine Zeitung (FAZ) compared the productions favourably with those of the Bayreuth Festival and noted that singers make their way to Bayreuth from Minden.

Minden Wagner project
Date	Title	Stage director	Singers	Press
2002	Der fliegende Holländer	Holger Müller-Brandes		DF NW
2005	Tannhäuser	Keith Warner	John Pierce (Tannhäuser); Anne Schwanewilms (Elisabeth)	DF
2009	Lohengrin	John Dew	John Pierce (Lohengrin); Anna Gabler (Elsa)	ON
2012	Tristan und Isolde	Matthias von Stegmann	Andreas Schager and Dara Hobbs	FAZ
2023	Parsifal	Eric Vigié		
2012	Die Meistersinger von Nürnberg	Jakob Peters-Messer	Simon Bailey (Sachs)	nmz

=== Der Ring in Minden ===
From 2015, the same team staged a yearly production of the four parts of Der Ring des Nibelungen, presenting the complete cycle twice in 2019.

Der Ring in Minden
Date	Title	Stage director	Singers	Press
2015	Das Rheingold	Gerd Heinz	Heiko Trinsinger (Alberich), Renatus Mészár (Wotan), Kathrin Göring (Fricka), Julia Bauer (Freia), Thomas Mohr (Loge), Tijl Faveyts (Fasolt)	OMM
2016	Die Walküre	Gerd Heinz	Mohr (Siegmund), Hobbs (Brünnhilde), Faveyts (Hunding), Mészár (Wotan), Göring (Fricka, Waltraute),	FAZ
2017	Siegfried	Gerd Heinz	Jeff Martin (Mime), Mohr (Siegfried), Mészár (Wanderer), Janina Baechle (Erda), Hobbs (Brünnhilde)	Merker
2018	Götterdämmerung	Gerd Heinz	Mohr (Siegfried), Hobbs (Brünnhilde), Mészár (Gunter), Andreas Hörl (Hagen), Göring (Waltraute)	NMZ
2019	Der Ring des Nibelungen	Gerd Heinz		
