= Tijl Faveyts =

Belgian operatic bass

- Education: Royal Conservatory of Brussels; University of Music and Performing Arts Vienna
- Occupation: Operatic bass
- Organizations: Theater St. Gallen; Aalto Theatre; Komische Oper Berlin
- Website: www.faveyts.info

Tijl Faveyts is a Belgian operatic bass who made an international career. He has performed leading roles such as Mozart's Sarastro and Hunding in Wagner's Die Walküre and Gurnemanz in Parsifal at major opera houses, concert halls and festivals, and made recordings.

== Life and career ==
Born in Belgium, Faveyts studied voice at the Royal Conservatory of Brussels and the University of Music and Performing Arts Vienna, with Ralf Döring and Robert Holl.

Faveyts was engaged at the Theater St. Gallen from 2005 to 2012, where he appeared in roles such as Don Basilio in Rossini's Il barbiere di Siviglia, Oroveso in Bellini's Norma, and the Doctor in Alban Berg's Wozzeck. In 2006, he appeared as Sarastro in Mozart's Die Zauberflöte at the Aix-en-Provence Festival, conducted by Daniel Harding, which won him international attention. In 2012, he made his U.S. debut as the Doctor in Wozzeck in Berkeley, Los Angeles and New York, with the London Philharmonia Orchestra conducted by Esa-Pekka Salonen.

In 2013, Faveyts became a member of the ensemble at the Aalto Theatre in Essen, where he appeared in roles such as Hunding in Wagner's Die Walküre, Kezal in Smetana's Die Verkaufte Braut, Ramfis in Verdi's Aida, Oroveso in Bellini's Norma, and Lodovico in Verdi's Otello alongside Gaston Rivero in the title role. In 2019 he joined the ensemble of the Komische Oper Berlin, where he will be seen as Sarastro, Gremin in Tchaikovsky's Jewgeni Onegin, Commendatore in Mozart's Don Giovanni and Sparafucile in Verdi's Rigoletto. His roles also include Osmin in Mozart's Die Entführung aus dem Serail, Daland in Wagner's Der fliegende Holländer, Marke in Tristan und Isolde, Fasolt and Hunding in Der Ring des Nibelungen, the title role in Donizetti's Don Pasquale, Roi de Trèfle in Prokofiev's L'amour des trois oranges, Comte des Grieux in Massenet's Manon and Orest in Elektra by Richard Strauss. From 2026 he will join the ensemble of the Oper Köln

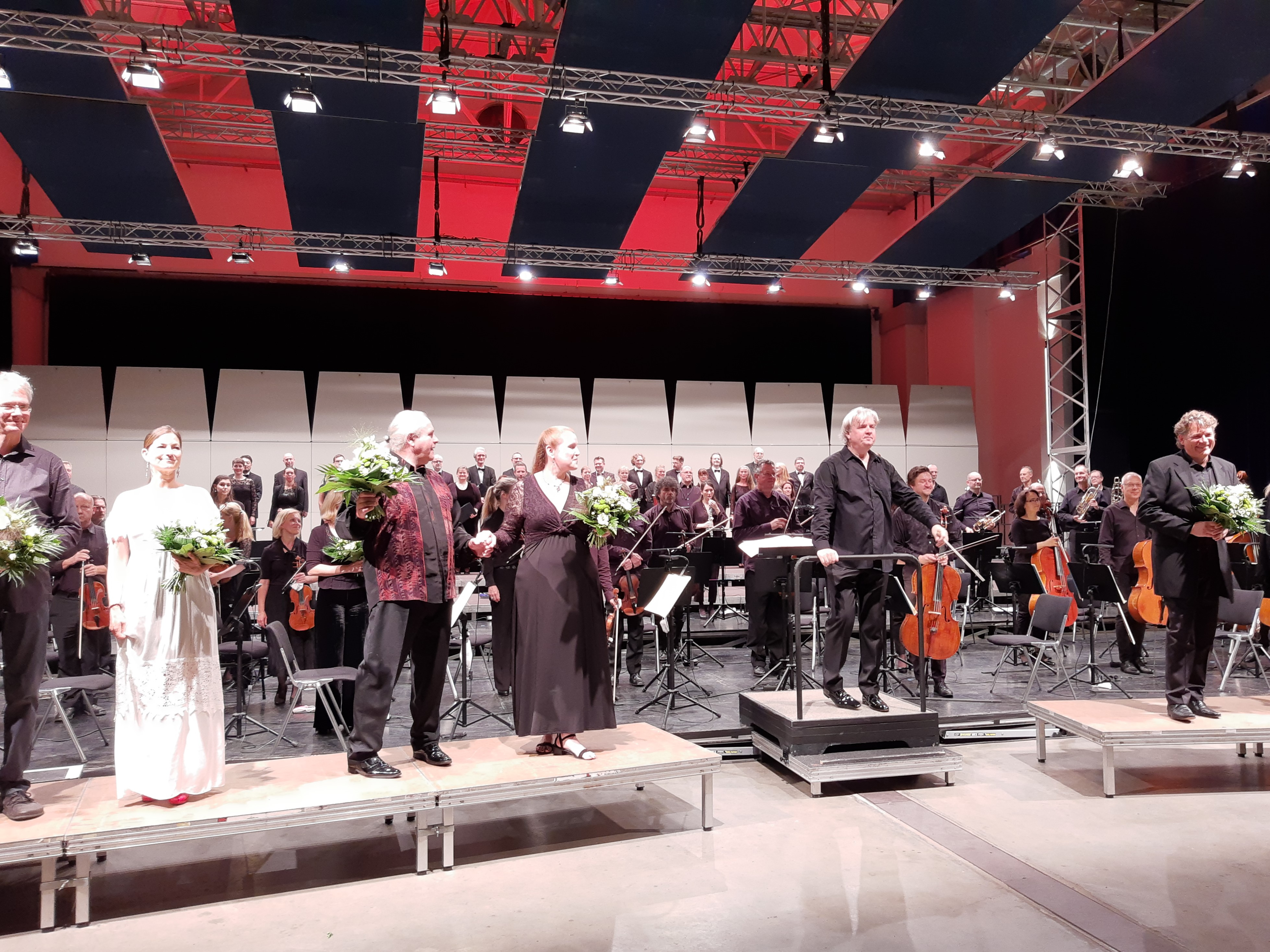
As Rocco, left, after a concert performance of Fidelio, 2021

From 2015, Faveyts appeared as Fasolt and Hunding in Der Ring in Minden, Wagner's Ring cycle at the Stadttheater Minden conducted by Frank Beermann, which was completed in 2019. A reviewer noted his interpretation as convincingly lyrical in voice and action. Hunding is portrayed as a person with a certain social background, not an evil character, with a striking low vocal register.

On 10 July 2021, he appeared as Rocco in Beethoven's Fidelio in a concert performance at the Alfred Fischer Hall in Hamm as part of the KlassikSommer Hamm festival. Beermann conducted the Nordwestdeutsche Philharmonie, choir and soloists. In January 2022 he made his house debut in the Bayerische Staatsoper München as Vanuzzi in Die schweigsame Frau. In March 2022, he performed as the King in Aida at the Semperoper in Dresden conducted by Christian Thielemann. In November 2022 he made his Italian operatic debut at the Teatro Pavarotti-Freni Modena and the Teatro Communale Reggio Emilia as Landgraf Hermann in Tannhäuser, conducted by Marcus Bosch. In September 2023 he made his role debut as Gurnemanz in Parsifal at the Theater Minden conducted by Beermann and directed by Eric Vigié. In June 2024 he made his Hungarian debut as Fasolt in Das Rheingold at the Müpa conducted by Ádám Fischer. In 2025 he made his debut at the Bayreuth Festival as Hans Schwarz in Die Meistersinger von Nürnberg and Second Knight in Parsifal. In 2026 he made his Norwegian debut as Arkel in Debussy's Pelléas et Mélisande, returned to La Monnaie as Balducci in Benvenuto Cellini by Berlioz, and to the Oper Köln as Hunding. and Fasolt Das Rheingold and Gurnemanz Parsifal at the Müpa Budapest.

Faveyts appeared as a guest at the Vlaamse Opera in Ghent and Antwerp, Grand Théâtre de Luxembourg, Theater an der Wien in Vienna, Staatsoper Stuttgart, Oper Leipzig, the opera of Bilbao, Staatstheater am Gärtnerplatz in Munich, Teatro Cervantes Malaga, Theater Bonn, Opera de Lille, Oper Köln, Grand Théâtre de Genève, St. Galler Festspiele, Macao cultural center, NCPA Kaoshiung, National Centre for the Performing Arts in Beijing and the Israeli Opera in Tel Aviv. He has worked with conductors such as Antonino Fogliani, Kent Nagano, Fabio Luisi, Kazushi Ōno, Giacomo Sagripanti, Konstantin Trinks, Marc Albrecht, Daniel Harding, Christophe Eschenbach, Antonello Manacorda, Daniele Gatti, Pablo Heras-Casado and Carlo Rizzi. Stage directors with whom he worked have included Stéphane Braunschweig, Barrie Kosky, Vincent Broussard, Mariame Clément, Frank Castorf, Stefan Herheim, Kasper Holten and Guy Joosten.

In concert, Faveyts has performed at the Lincoln Center in New York City with the Philharmonia Orchestra in 2012, repeated at the Zellerbach Hall in Berkeley and the Disney Concert Hall in Los Angeles. He also appeared at the Wiener Festwochen and the Musikverein Vienna, Elbphilharmonie Hamburg, Concertgebouw in Amsterdam, Konzerthaus Berlin and the Tchaikovsky Concert Hall in Moscow, among others. He has performed as a soloist in Bach's St Matthew Passion and St John Passion, Handel's Messiah, Haydn's Die Jahreszeiten and Die Schöpfung, and Mozart's Requiem. In recital, he has performed Schubert's Die Winterreise.

== Recordings ==
Faveyts recorded the role of the King in Schreker's Der Schatzgräber in 2012 and the role of the Pfleger des Orest in Strauss' Elektra with the Nederlandse Opera in Amsterdam and the Netherlands Philharmonic Orchestra conducted by Marc Albrecht. He performed the role of the Old Man in a 2014 recording of Martinů's Ariane from the Aalto Theatre, conducted by Tomáš Netopil. In a 2017 production from the Aalto of Meyerbeer's Le Prophète conducted by Giuliano Carella, he appeared as Zacharie, and in 2020 he recorded the role of the Hermit in Tatjana Gürbaca's production of Weber's Der Freischütz at the Aalto conducted by Tomáš Netopil. In 2018 he performed the role of Arkel in the studiorecording of Impressions de Pélleas from Marius Constant. In 2010 he recorded a DVD of Puccini's La fanciulla del West and in 2011 Saint-Saëns' Samson et Dalila with the Vlaamse Opera.
