= Der Ring in Minden =

Stage production

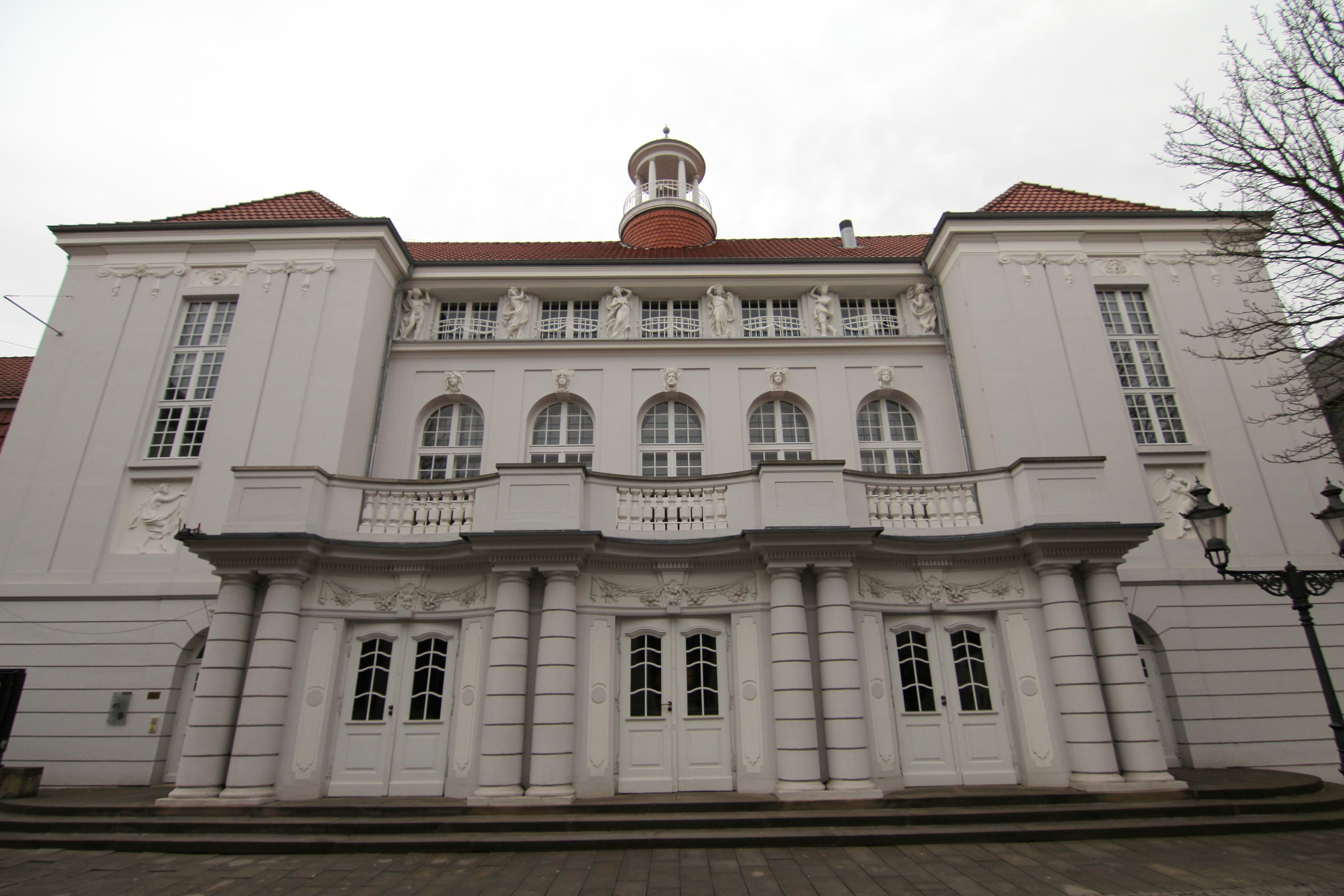
- Stadttheater Minden
- Time: 2015 Das Rheingold; 2016 Die Walküre; 2017 Siegfried; 2018 Götterdämmerung; 2019 Der Ring des Nibelungen
- Location: Minden, North Rhine-Westphalia, Germany
- Website: www.ring-in-minden.de

Der Ring in Minden was a project to stage Richard Wagner's cycle Der Ring des Nibelungen at the Stadttheater Minden, beginning in 2015 with Das Rheingold, followed by the other parts in the succeeding years, and culminating with the complete cycle performed twice in 2019. The stage director was Gerd Heinz, and Frank Beermann conducted the Nordwestdeutsche Philharmonie, playing on the stage of the small theatre. The singers acted in front of the orchestra, making an intimate approach to the dramatic situations possible. The project received international recognition and was compared favourably to the Bayreuth Festival.

== History ==
In 1999, a project to show stage works by Richard Wagner was begun by the Richard-Wagner-Verband in Minden, the Stadttheater Minden and the Nordwestdeutsche Philharmonie. Jutta Hering-Winckler, the president of the Richard-Wagner-Verband, was the driving force of the Wagner project, and particularly the Ring in Minden. The first work presented was Der fliegende Holländer in 2002, followed by Tannhäuser in 2005, staged by Keith Warner and conducted by Frank Beermann. After Lohengrin in 2009 and Tristan und Isolde in 2012, the Ring project, aiming to present the complete Der Ring des Nibelungen, opened in 2015 with Das Rheingold. It was followed a year later by Die Walküre, in 2017 by Siegfried, and in 2018 by Götterdämmerung. In 2019, the complete cycle was presented twice.

In 2019, the Rheingold production was presented in a concert version as the opening of the Kissinger Sommer festival supported by the state of Bavaria.

== Stage and team ==
As the pit of the theatre is too small for a Wagner opera, the orchestra was positioned at the back of the stage, separated by a gauze curtain from the singers acting in front. Depending on the lighting, the orchestra and the conductor could be visible or hidden. The singers acted close to the audience as in a play, many of them playing several roles.

Throughout the Wagner project, Frank Beermann conducted the Nordwestdeutsche Philharmonie, a symphony orchestra which normally plays no operas. The stage and costumes were designed by Frank Philipp Schlößmann, who was the stage director for Tankred Dorst's presentation of the Ring Cycle at the Bayreuth Festival from 2006 to 2010. In Minden, he had designed the set for Tristan und Isolde.

Schlößmann designed a large ring, illuminated in different colours, as a portal to the stage, with a smaller ring appearing at times in the background. A spiral staircase on the left made the balcony accessible from the stage, and sparsely used elements such as stylized tree trunks suggested scenery. The director of the Ring was Gerd Heinz, who focused on the psychological relations between the characters. He had the funeral march for Siegfried played without a background, as a symphonic poem on violence. In his version of the final music, all performers return to the stage, turning their back to the audience and listening to the music, which has the last word ("das letzte Wort"), leaving questions of resignation, end of the world or hope for renewal open.

== Reception ==
The performances were attended and reviewed internationally, including by the Austrian Online Merker. Reviews by Eleonore Büning in the Frankfurter Allgemeine Zeitung (FAZ) compared the productions favourably with those of the Bayreuth Festival and noted that singers made their way to Bayreuth from Minden. Reviews also appeared in the Neue Musikzeitung (NMZ) and the Online Musik Magazin (OMM), among others.

The project was described as meeting Wagner's thought of the "birth of drama from the spirit of music" ("Geburt des Dramas aus dem Geist der Musik"), by singers who cultivate a "German belcanto" with clear diction. The project has been summarized as "Das Wunder Minden" (Minden Miracle).

== Parts, roles and performers ==
The following table shows the four parts of the tetralogy Der Ring and some singers of leading roles. Most were the same in the first performance and in the complete Ring in 2019, but changes are shown in a second column, as listed on the project's website and in the summary reviews in the FAZ and the Merker.

Der Ring in Minden
Title	Singers	Alternative singer in 2019	Reviews
Das Rheingold	Heiko Trinsinger (Alberich), Renatus Mészár (Wotan), Kathrin Göring (Fricka), Julia Bauer (Freia), Thomas Mohr (Loge), Tijl Faveyts (Fasolt)	Jeff Martin (Mime), Janina Baechle (Erda)	Merker, OMM
Die Walküre	Mohr (Siegmund), Magdalena Anna Hofmann (Sieglinde), Faveyts (Hunding), Dara Hobbs (Brünnhilde), Mészár (Wotan), Göring (Fricka, Waltraute)		FAZ OMM
Siegfried	Dan Karlström (Mime), Mohr (Siegfried), Mészár (Wanderer), Bauer (Waldvogel), Baechle (Erda), Hobbs (Brünnhilde)	Martin (Mime)	Merker
Götterdämmerung	Bauer (Third Norn / Woglinde), Mohr (Siegfried), Hobbs (Brünnhilde), Mészár (Gunter), Hofmann (Gutrune), Andreas Hörl (Hagen), Göring (Waltraute)		NMZ OMM Schott
