= Jutta Hering-Winckler =

German lawyer (born 1948)

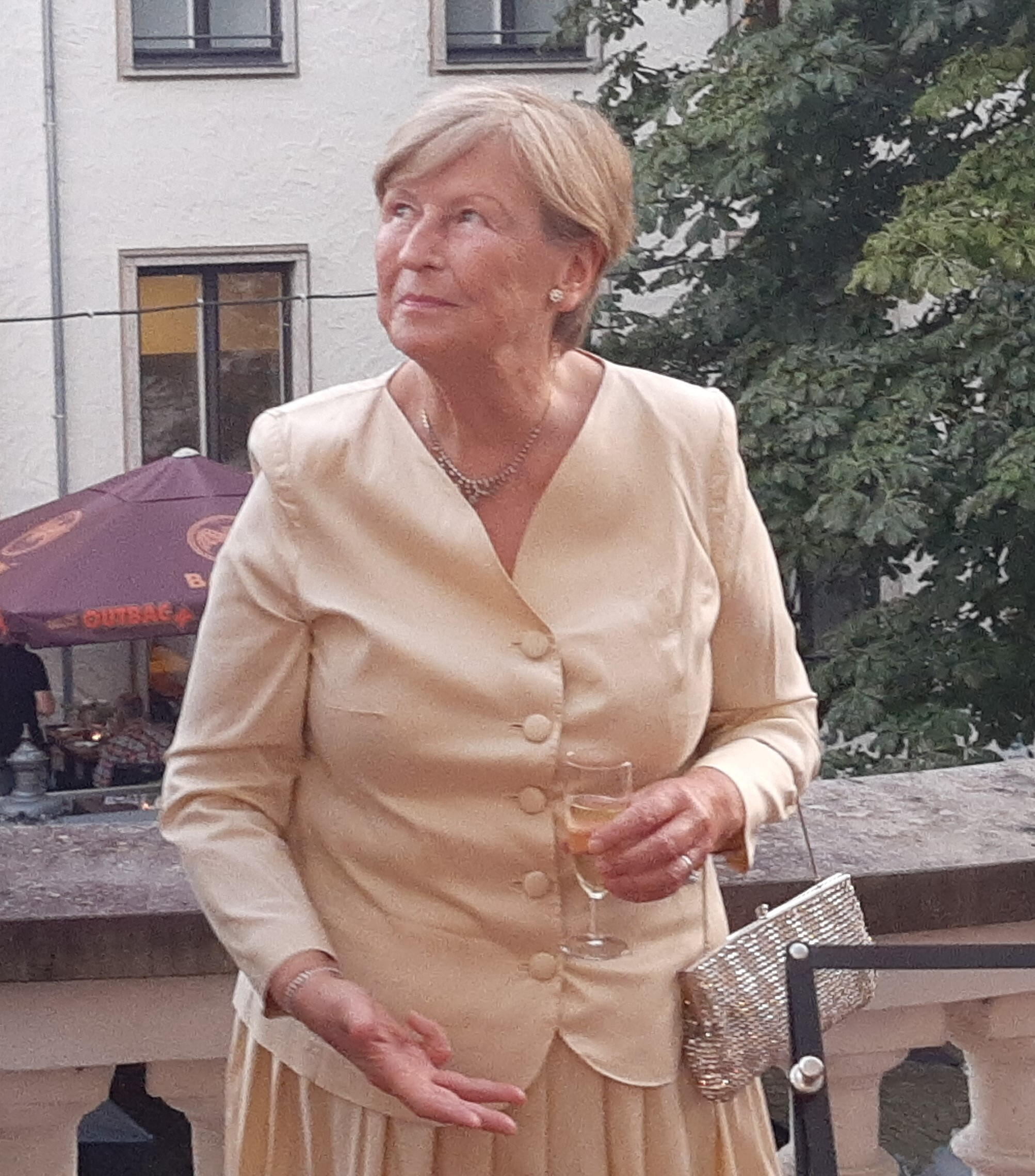
- Hering-Winckler at Stadttheater Minden in 2023
- Born: Jutta Hanna Edith Hering; 21 November 1948 (age 77)
- Occupations: Lawyer; Cultural manager
- Organizations: Richard Wagner Society Minden
- Known for: Der Ring in Minden

Jutta Hanna Edith Hering-Winckler (born 21 November 1948) is a German lawyer and patron of music. Since 1977, she has been head of a law firm in Minden as a lawyer and notary. Since 1999, she has been president of the Richard Wagner Society in Minden. She received awards for her civic engagement as the driving force of the Wagner project at the Stadttheater Minden, particularly Der Ring in Minden, which brought her hometown to international recognition.

== Life ==
Hering-Winckler's family was interested in Richard Wagner's work. Her grandfather had attended the premiere of the full Ring cycle, performed at the first Bayreuth Festival in 1876, and her mother, Eva Hering, was a long-term treasurer of the Richard Wagner Society in Minden. Hering-Winckler has run a law firm in Minden since 1977.

Beginning in 1999, when she became president of the Society, she initiated a series of productions of stageworks by Richard Wagner at the Stadttheater Minden in collaboration with the conductor Frank Beermann and the Nordwestdeutsche Philharmonie. The orchestra was positioned at the back of the stage of the small theatre, while the singers acted at the front of the stage, making an intimate approach to the dramatic situations possible. The first work presented was Der fliegende Holländer in 2002, on the occasion of the Society's 90th anniversary. Wolfgang Wagner was the patron of the performance and attended it. It was followed by Tannhäuser in 2005, Lohengrin in 2009 and Tristan und Isolde in 2012. Hering-Winckler worked towards raising interest among the younger audience by supporting performances at schools and extending invitations to students to visit rehearsals.

Hering-Winckler in conversation before Die Meistersinger

In 2015 the project known as Der Ring in Minden was launched, aiming to present the complete Der Ring des Nibelungen. It opened with Das Rheingold, followed a year later by Die Walküre, in 2017 by Siegfried, and in 2018 by Götterdämmerung. In 2019, the complete cycle was presented twice. Throughout the Wagner project, Frank Beermann conducted the Nordwestdeutsche Philharmonie, a symphony orchestra which normally does not play for operas. The performances were attended and reviewed internationally, including by the Austrian Online Merker. Reviews by Eleonore Büning in the Frankfurter Allgemeine Zeitung (FAZ) compared the productions favourably with those of the Bayreuth Festival and noted that singers made their way to Bayreuth from Minden. The project was described as meeting Wagner's thought of the "birth of drama from the spirit of music" ("Geburt des Dramas aus dem Geist der Musik"), by singers who cultivate a "German belcanto" with clear diction. The project has been summarised as "Das Wunder Minden" (Minden Miracle). Hering-Winckler is regarded as the driving force who made it all possible, with contacts in the musical scene and to sponsors.

In 2026, a production of Wagner's Die Meistersinger von Nürnberg premiered on 11 September.

== Awards ==
Hering-Winckler received the Ehrenring (Ring of Honour) of the City of Minden in recognition of her promotion of high-quality operatic events. The mayor said that she had made the impossible possible ("Sie haben das Unmögliche möglich gemacht"); she received congratulations from the Minister of Culture of North Rhine-Westphalia, Isabel Pfeiffer-Poensgen, and Wagner's great-granddaughter Eva Wagner-Pasquier, who represented the Bayreuth Festival.
