= Heiko Trinsinger =

Belgian operatic bass

- Education: Dresdner Kreuzchor; Musikhochschule Dresden
- Occupation: Operatic baritone
- Organization: Aalto Theatre
- Website: www.trinsinger.de

Heiko Trinsinger is a German operatic baritone. A member of the Aalto Theatre in Essen, he has performed leading roles at major houses, such as Mozart's Papageno and Wagner's Alberich.

== Life and career ==
From 1979 to 1987, Trinsinger was a member of the Dresdner Kreuzchor. He studied voice at the Musikhochschule Dresden and took several master classes.

Trinsinger was first engaged at the studio of the Bavarian State Opera, then at the Theater Würzburg. He appeared there as Papageno in Mozart's Die Zauberflöte alongside Diana Damrau, who first sang Pamina and then the Queen of the Night.

Trinsinger has been a member of the Aalto Theatre in Essen since 1999, where he appeared in roles such as Amonasro in Verdi's Aida. He went on to sing more roles in the Italian repertoire, but also Wagner characters such as Orsini in Rienzi, Kurwenal in Tristan und Isolde, and Wolfram in Tannhäuser. In 2010, he appeared as Dr. Schön in Alban Berg's Lulu, alongside Julia Bauer in the title role.

He appeared as a guest at major German opera houses, such as Hamburg, the Bavarian State Opera, the Staatstheater Kassel, Bonn and the Hessisches Staatstheater Wiesbaden. In 2016 he appeared at the Komische Oper Berlin as Lord Ruthven in Marschner's Der Vampyr.

Trinsinger first performed as Wolfram at the Stadttheater Minden, where he also portrayed Telramund in Wagner's Lohengrin. From 2015, he appeared as Alberich in Der Ring in Minden, Wagner's Ring Cycle at the Stadttheater Minden conducted by Frank Beermann, which was completed in 2019. A reviewer noted his spectacular expressiveness in every situation. Another reviewer mentioned his thunderous curse of the ring in Das Rheingold.

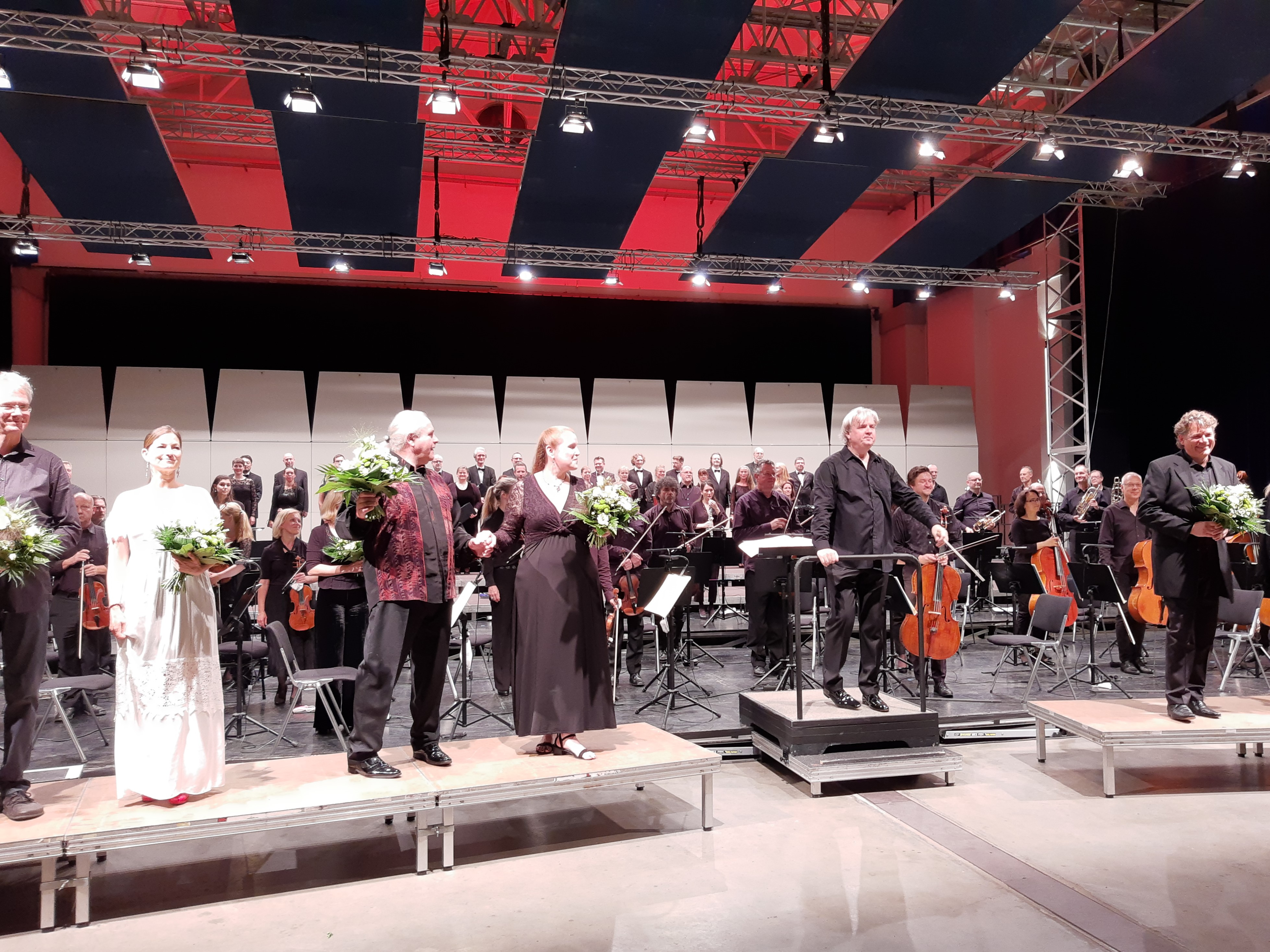
As Pizarro, right, after a concert performance of Fidelio, 2021

On 10 July 2021, Trinsinger appeared as Pizarro in Beethoven's Fidelio in a concert performance at the Alfred Fischer Hall in Hamm as part of the KlassikSommer Hamm festival. Beermann conducted the Nordwestdeutsche Philharmonie, choir and soloists.

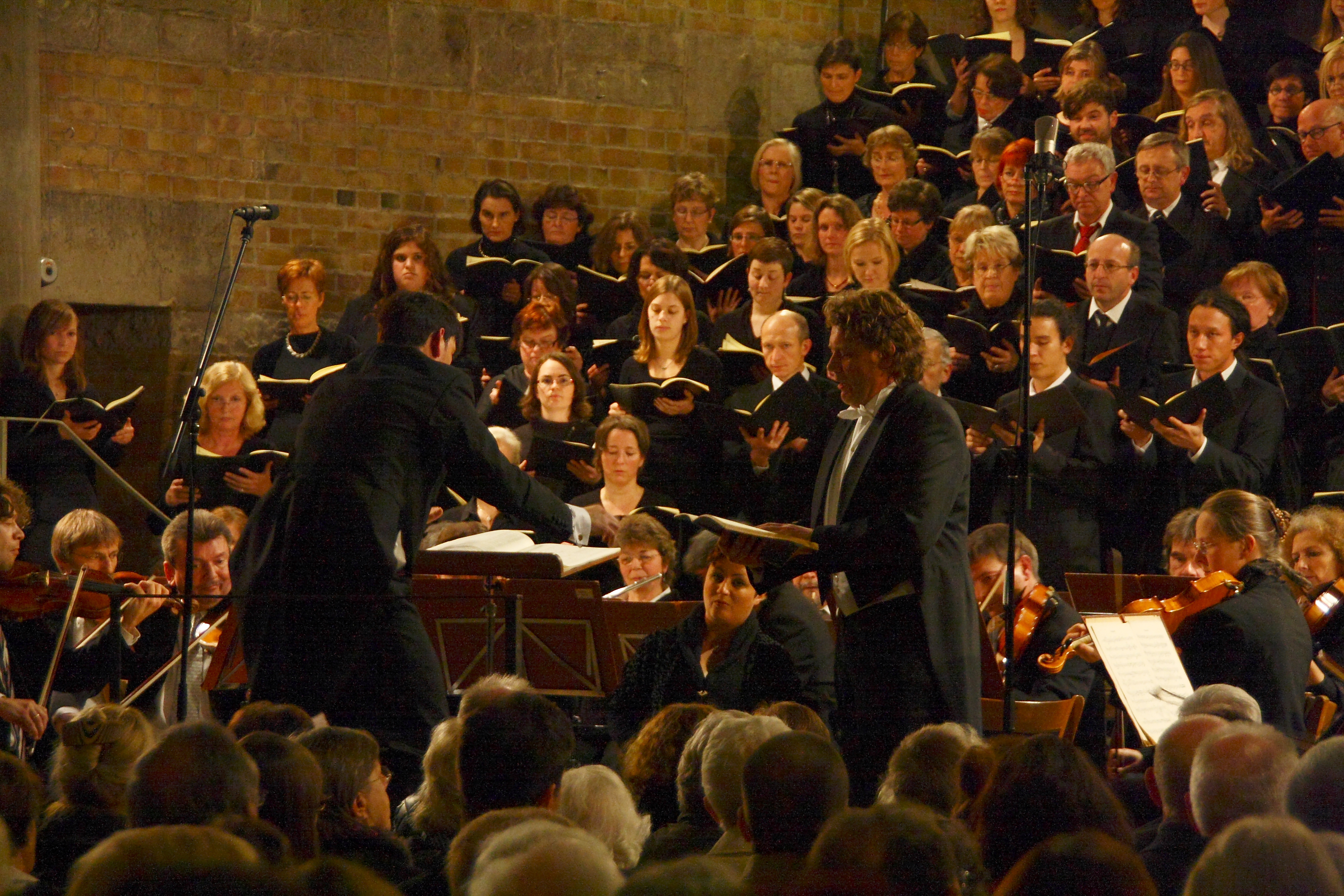
Trinsinger in the Brahms Requiem, 2012

In concert, he appeared as the baritone soloist in Ein deutsches Requiem by Johannes Brahms at the St. Johannis church in Würzburg in 2012, among others.
