= Thomas Mohr (tenor) =

German opera singer (born 1961)

- Born: 17 October 1961 (age 64); Neumünster, Germany
- Education: Musikhochschule Lübeck
- Occupations: Operatic tenor; Operatic baritone; Academic teacher; Festival manager
- Organization: Hochschule für Künste Bremen
- Website: thomasmohr.eu

Thomas Mohr (born 17 October 1961) is a German operatic tenor and academic voice teacher. He began his career as a baritone, but moved on to heldentenor and has performed roles in all tenor parts of Wagner's Der Ring des Nibelungen at Der Ring in Minden. He has appeared at major international opera houses and concert halls, and made recordings. Mohr is a professor of voice at the Hochschule für Künste Bremen. He also runs an agricultural estate where he founded a music festival.

== Career ==
Born in Neumünster, Mohr studied voice at the Musikhochschule Lübeck from 1980 with Karl Heinz Pinhammer, and graduated in 1985 with distinction in the Konzertexamen (concert exam). He won prizes at international competitions already during his studies, such as the International Vocal Competition 's-Hertogenbosch, the VDMK competition in Berlin and the Walther Gruner Competition in London. He further studied with Anna Reynolds.

=== Baritone ===
Mohr made his operatic debut at the Lübeck Opera in 1984 as Silvio in Leoncavallo's Pagliacci. He was engaged as a baritone at the Theater Bremen (1985 to 1997) and Nationaltheater Mannheim, and then moved to the Oper Bonn in 1990, where he collaborated with notable directors such as Giancarlo del Monaco, Jürgen Rose, Werner Schroeter, András Fricsay and Andreas Homoki. His roles there included Luna in Verdi's Il trovatore, Germont in Verdi's La traviata, Eisenstein in Die Fledermaus by Johann Strauss, Peter in Humperdinck's Hänsel und Gretel, Almaviva in Mozart's Le nozze di Figaro and Papageno in Die Zauberflöte. He took part in the world premiere of Manfred Trojahn's Enrico at the 1991 Schwetzingen Festival with the ensemble of the Bavarian State Opera. He appeared as a guest at the Opernhaus Zürich, the Semperoper in Dresden, and the Liceu in Barcelona, among others.

In concert, he performed the solo parts in Carl Orff's Carmina burana, Ein deutsches Requiem by Brahms, and Britten's War Requiem. Mohr has worked freelance since 1997. He collaborated with the Boston Symphony Orchestra and performed at the Schleswig-Holstein Musik Festival and Ludwigsburg Festival, among others.

=== Tenor ===
Mohr turned to roles of the tenor and heldentenor repertoire, performing the title role of Mozart's Idomeneo and Siegmund in Wagner's Die Walküre directed by Robert Carsens in the 2005/06 season at the Cologne Opera. He appeared as Wagner's Parsifal at the Theater Erfurt in 2006. In operetta, he was Danilo in Lehar's Die lustige Witwe in Cologne, and Eisenstein in Die Fledermaus at the Bavarian State Opera. Mohr performed the role of Max in Weber's Der Freischütz in both Cologne and at the Theater St. Gallen.

Mohr appeared as Loge in Wagner's Das Rheingold at the Oper Leipzig in 2013. A review noted: "Thomas Mohr as Loge was a standout, his tenor full of colour and flexibility, revealing the complex character of a trickster who is also a sympathetic demigod. He infused meaning to every word, whispering intrigues and plotting schemes. His clear and ringing high notes cut through the orchestra; his legato made me realize that Wagner could be sung as Mozart." Mohr also performed the title role of Siegfried in Götterdämmerung there in 2016. In the project Der Ring in Minden, he sang Loge in 2015, Siegmund in 2016, then the title role of Siegfried in 2017, with a review noting good declamation, rhythmic precision, tender legato, and brilliance in the final duet, and finally Siegfried in Götterdämmerung in 2018. In the complete cycle in 2019, Der Ring in Minden, he sang all four roles.

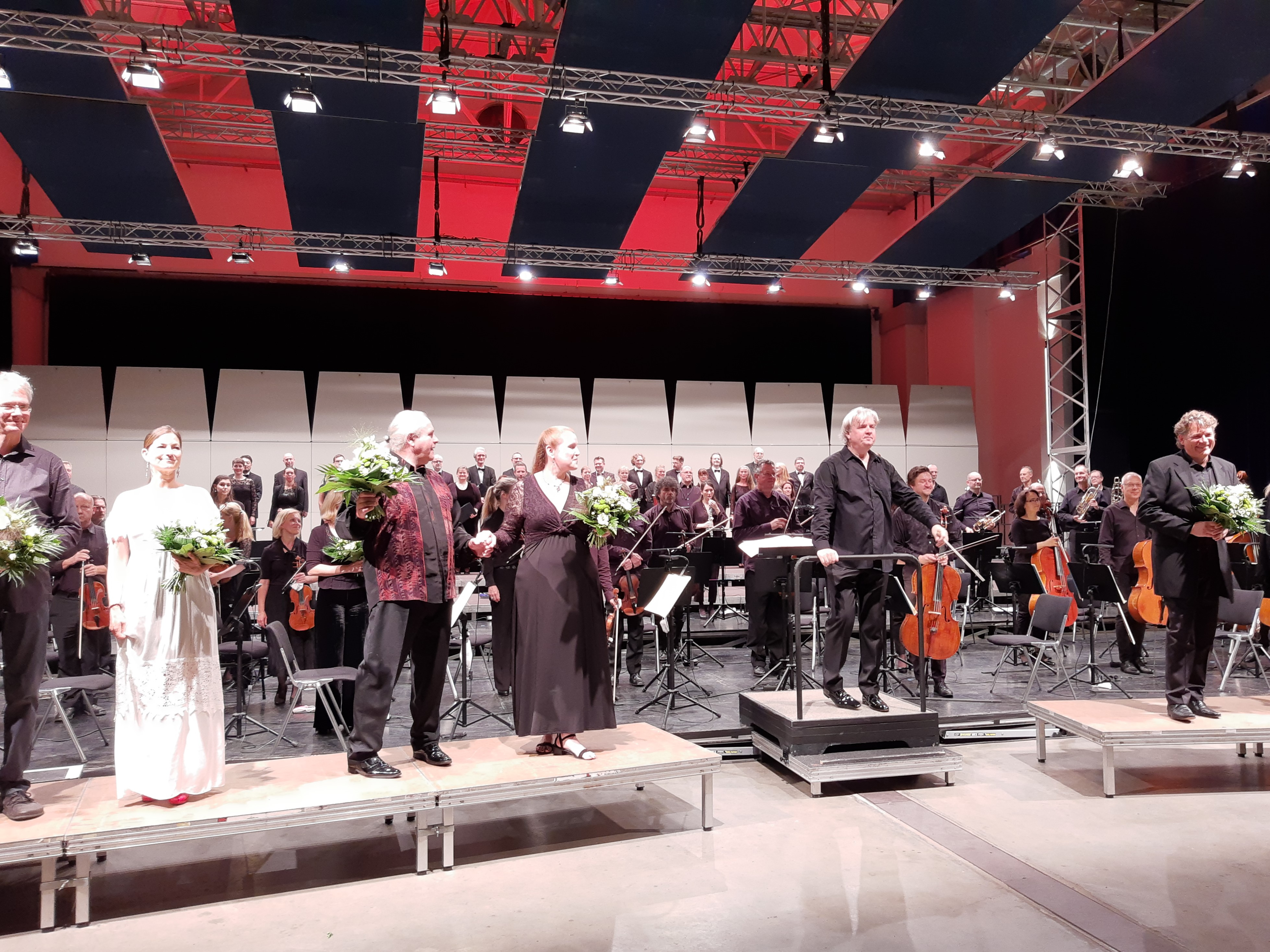
As Florestan, third from left, after a concert performance of Fidelio, 2021

On 10 July 2021, Mohr appeared as Florestan in Beethoven's Fidelio in a concert performance at the Alfred Fischer Hall in Hamm as part of the KlassikSommer Hamm festival. Frank Beermann conducted the Nordwestdeutsche Philharmonie, choir and soloists.

=== Teaching ===
Mohr has been professor of voice at the Hochschule für Künste Bremen since the 2002/03 semester. Among his students is tenor Mirko Ludwig.

=== Agriculture and festival ===
Mohr also runs an agricultural estate, Isemohr, in Kleinkummerfeld near Neumünster. He founded a festival there in 1996, named KKKK, which is short for Klein Kummerfelder Kuhstall Konzerte (Kleinkummerfeld cow stables concerts). It features concerts of a wide repertoire from Baroque to Pop, held in the open air (weather permitting) and in the whitewashed cowshed.

== Recordings ==
In 1993, Mohr was part of a complete recording of Busoni's opera Arlecchino, conducted by Kent Nagano, in the role of Ser Matteo del Sarto. He took part in a recording of Kienzl's opera Don Quixote in 1998, conducted by Gustav Kuhn, performing the title role.
