= Frank Philipp Schlößmann =

German theatre director and theatre manager

- Born: 1963 (age 61–62); Bad König, Germany
- Education: Mozarteum
- Occupations: Scenic designer; Costume designer

Frank Philipp Schlößmann (born 1963) is a German scenic designer focused on operas who has worked at major opera houses and festivals internationally. He staged Janáček's Jenůfa at the Metropolitan Opera, Wagner's Der Ring des Nibelungen at both the Bayreuth Festival and Der Ring in Minden, and the world premiere of Heinz Holliger's Lunea at the Opernhaus Zürich.

== Career ==
Born in Bad König, Odenwald, Schlößmann studied design of stage and costumes (Bühnen- und Kostümgestaltung) at the Salzburg Mozarteum from 1985 to 1989.

He has worked freelance since 1991, collaborating with directors such as Philipp Himmelmann, Harry Kupfer and Olivier Tambosi. In Germany, he worked for the Komische Oper, Hamburgische Staatsoper, Cologne Opera, the Semperoper in Dresden and the Bavarian State Opera. In Europe, he staged for the Royal Opera House in London, in Dublin, in Amsterdam, Antwerp, in Strasbourg, Bologna and Catania, at La Fenice in Venice and the Liceu in Barcelona, in Oslo, Helsinki and Basel. In the Americas, he designed stages and costumes for the Houston Grand Opera and the Teatro Colón in Buenos Aires, among others. He has also worked in Beijing, Tokyo, and for the Mariinsky Theatre in Saint Petersburg.

Schlößmann designed stages for Puccini's Tosca at the English National Opera, Manon Lescaut at the Lyric Opera in Chicago and the San Francisco Opera, where he also created designs for Janáček's The Makropulos Case and Jenůfa and Verdi's Falstaff, and Janáček's Jenůfa at the Metropolitan Opera in New York City and the Los Angeles Opera.

Schlößmann designed stages for festivals including the Innsbruck Festival of Early Music and the Handel Festival Halle. He designed the set for Wagner's Der Ring des Nibelungen directed by Tankred Dorst at the Bayreuth Festival, presented from 2006 to 2010. He also designed the set for Katharina Wagner's 2015 production of Tristan und Isolde there.

At the Bregenz Festival of 2016, Schlößmann directed a revival of Franco Faccio's opera Amleto from 1865, which had been forgotten for 140 years. He staged Donizetti's L'elisir d'amore at the Staatsoper Berlin and Verdi's La traviata for the Oper Leipzig, Staatstheater Saarbrücken, the Deutsche Oper Berlin and the Deutsche Oper am Rhein. He created sets for Wagner's Der fliegende Holländer at the Volksoper in Vienna, and Puccini's Madama Butterfly at the Opernhaus Dortmund.

Schlößmann was the designer of stage and costumes for Der Ring in Minden, presenting Wagner's Ring cycle staged by Gerd Heinz from 2015 to 2019. He framed the stage there by a large ring illuminated in changing colours. For the world premiere of Heinz Holliger's opera Lunea at the Opernhaus Zürich on 18 February 2018, scenes after Lenau, he designed the stage for the production staged by Andreas Homoki with Christian Gerhaher in the title role and the composer conducting.
