= John Pierce (tenor) =

American operatic tenor

- Born: John Charles Pierce; January 11, 1959 (age 66); Woodstock, Illinois, U.S.
- Education: University of Illinois at Urbana-Champaign
- Occupations: Operatic tenor; Academic teacher
- Organizations: Staatstheater Cottbus; University of Michigan School of Music; University of Minnesota Duluth

John Charles Pierce (born January 11, 1959) is an American operatic tenor and academic voice teacher. He made an international career based in Germany, and focused on Wagner roles such as Tannhäuser, Lohengrin and Tristan.

== Career ==
Pierce was born in Woodstock, Illinois, to parents who were both music professionals. He studied at the University of Illinois at Urbana-Champaign to 1982, with William Warfield, Grace Wilson and John Wustman, graduating as a Master of Music. He began his career as a baritone, but turned to the heldentenor repertoire, and won the Wagner-Preis of the Liederkranz Foundation Competition in New York City in 1992.

In 1992, he moved with his family to Germany where he became a member of the Staatstheater Cottbus. In 2002, he turned to freelance singing. He appeared at international opera houses. In 2004, he appeared in the title role of Friedrich Cerha's Der Rattenfänger at the Wiener Festwochen. He performed the title role of Wagner's Tannhäuser at the Stadttheater Minden in October 2005, and of Lohengrin in 2009. He appeared as Tristan first at the Opernhaus Dortmund in 2000, and performed the role internationally, including in Prague, Rio de Janeiro, Innsbruck, Rotterdam, La Plata-Argentina and at the 2010 Richard Wagner Festival Wels.

Pierce has also been active as a concert singer, performing oratorios such as Handel's Messiah, Mozart's Requiem, Beethoven's Ninth Symphony, Dvořák's Requiem and Verdi's Requiem. He has performed lieder, such as Schubert's Die Winterreise with accompanist John Wustmann.

Pierce was extraordinary professor of voice at the University of Michigan School of Music. He has lectured at the Department of Music at the University of Minnesota Duluth.

In 2015, Pierce opened Duluth Fine Pianos, serving the community with pianos and piano service. www.DuluthFinePianos.com. He continues to sing with the Lyric Opera of the North (LOON Opera) title role of Rigoletto among others, and as a member of the Twin Ports Tenors.

== Repertoire ==
Pierce has appeared in operatic roles including:

- Florestan – Fidelio (Beethoven)
- Tony – West Side Story (Bernstein)
- Don José – Carmen (Bizet)
- Peter Grimes – Peter Grimes (Britten)
- Laca Klemeň/Števa Buryja – Jenůfa (Janáček)
- Boris – Katja Kabanowa (Janáček)
- Hoffmann – Hoffmanns Erzählungen (Offenbach)
- Samson – Samson et Dalila (Saint-Saëns)
- Bursche – Das Spielwerk (Franz Schreker)
- Herman – Pique Dame (Tchaikovsky)
- Otello – Otello (Verdi)
- Loge – Das Rheingold (Wagner)
- Erik – Der fliegende Holländer (Wagner)
- Lohengrin – Lohengrin (Wagner)
- Parsifal – Parsifal (Wagner)
- Tannhäuser – Tannhäuser (Wagner)
- Tristan – Tristan und Isolde (Wagner)
- Max – Der Freischütz (Weber)

== Awards ==
- 1999 Max-Grünebaum-Preis of the Tuchfabrikanten in Cottbus
- Honorary member of the Internationale Hans-von-Bülow-Gesellschaft
