= Konzerthalle Bad Salzuflen =

Concert hall of Bad Salzuflen, North Rhine-Westphalia, Germany

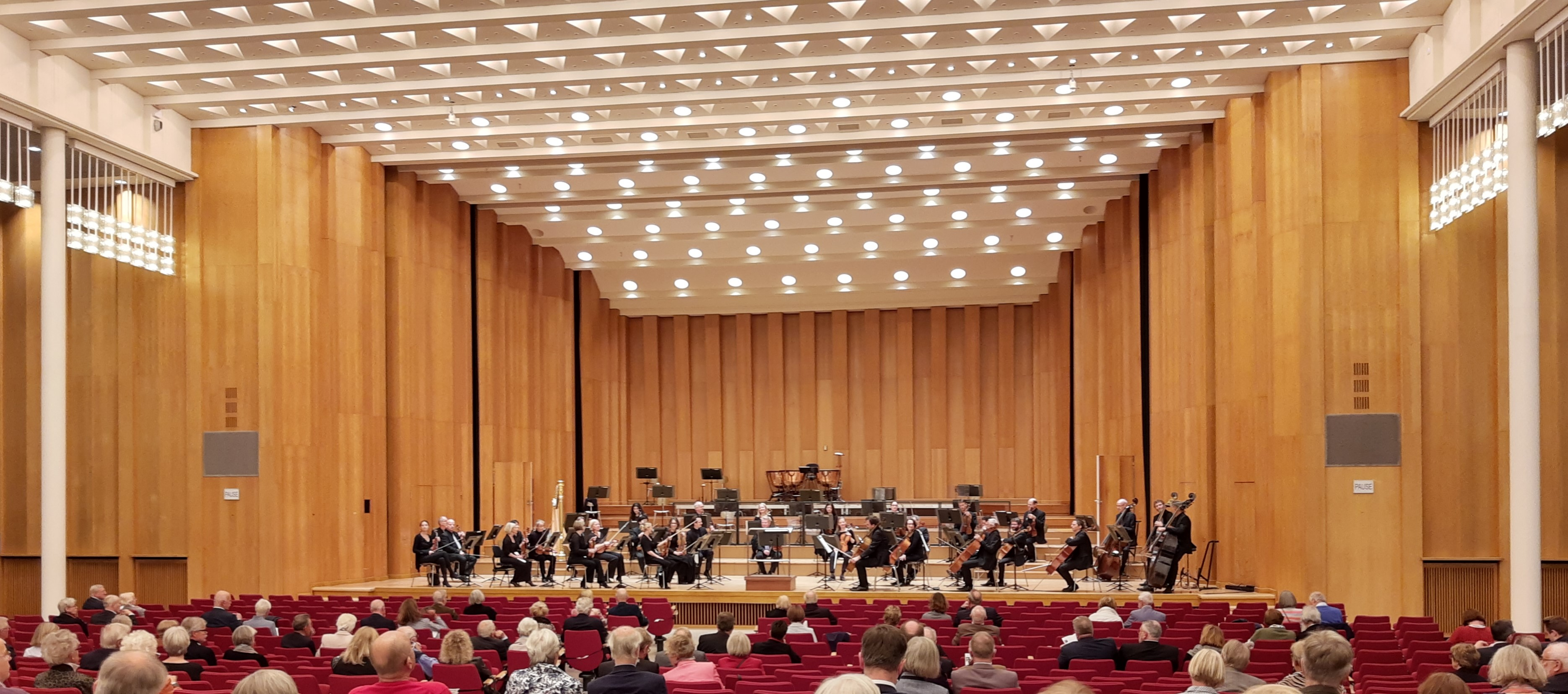
- Nordwestdeutsche Philharmonie In concert in 2020, the orchestra and audience reduced because of the COVID-19 pandemic
- Interactive map of Konzerthalle Bad Salzuflen
- Location: Bad Salzuflen, North Rhine-Westphalia, Germany
- Coordinates: 52°05′14″N 08°44′58″E
- Capacity: 1,200

Construction
- Opened: 1963
- Architect: Wilhelm Müller

The Konzerthalle Bad Salzuflen, also referred to as Konzerthalle, is the concert hall of Bad Salzuflen, a spa town in North Rhine-Westphalia, Germany. It was built from 1960 to 1963 after designs by Wilhelm Müller in connection with the Wandelhalle at the entrance to the Kurpark. It became a listed monument in 2005 and was modernized to meet environmental requirements in 2009/10. The hall is one of the regular venues of the Nordwestdeutsche Philharmonie.

== History ==
The Konzerthalle in Bad Salzuflen was designed, together with the connected Wandelhalle, by Wilhelm Müller in 1960. Müller was Oberbaurat, chief officer of the building department of the Landesverband Lippe. The buildings are steel skeleton structures with flat roofs and have broad glass fronts and walls covered with stone. The complex was built from 1960 to 1963, and opened on 17 May 1963. The hall and the Wandelhalle form an ensemble at the entrance to the Kurpark. It is an example of the spa architecture of the 1960s. The hall seats 1,200 listeners and became known for good acoustics. The foyer is also used for events such as art exhibitions. It was declared a listed historic building on 29 March 2005.

The Konzerthalle was restored in 2009 and 2010 with improved technical installations. To meet environmental goals, the lighting system was modernized, the glass windows were replaced, barrier-free access was established, and fire protection was improved.

The Nordwestdeutsche Philharmonie symphony orchestra holds regular symphony concerts, including a festival for Pentecost. The hall is also a venue for the Oratorienchor Detmold, a choir of the Musikhochschule Detmold.
