= Renatus Mészár =

German operatic bass

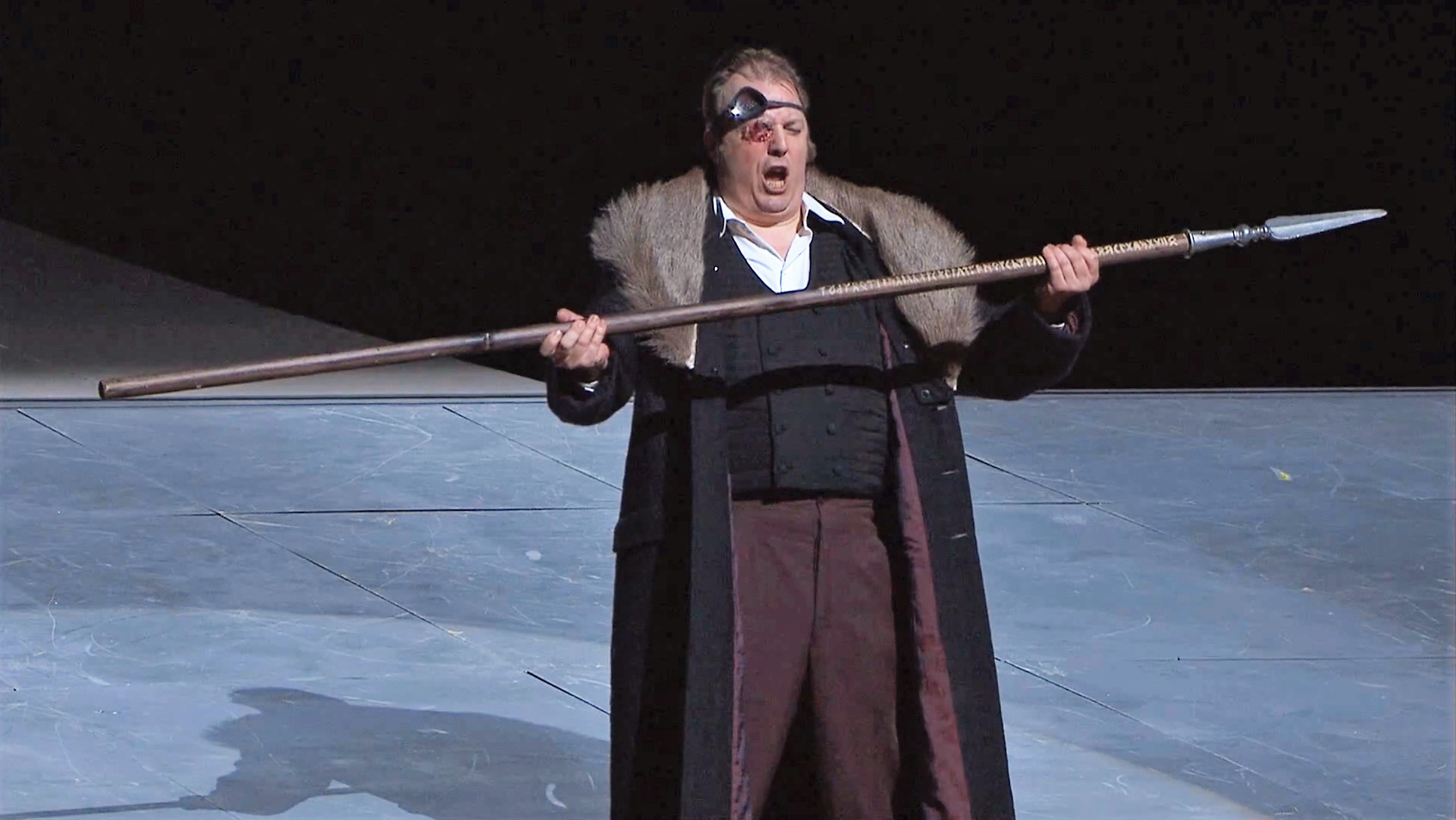
- Renatus Mészár as Wotan in Die Walküre, in 2008
- Born: Laubach, Hesse
- Education: Musikhochschule Hamburg; Musikhochschule München
- Occupation: Operatic bass
- Organizations: NDR Chor; Staatstheater Braunschweig; Badisches Staatstheater Karlsruhe
- Website: renatusmeszar.com

Renatus Mészár is a German operatic bass who has performed leading roles such as Wotan in Wagner's Der Ring des Nibelungen at major opera houses and festivals. Now a member of the Badisches Staatstheater Karlsruhe, he appeared in the world premiere of Avner Dorman's Wahnfried and the first recording of Bruno Maderna's Requiem.

== Career ==
Born in Laubach, Hesse, Mészár first learned piano and was a member in the local boys' choir. He studied church music at the Musikhochschule Hamburg, and then focused on voice at the Musikhochschule München, with teachers including Brigitte Fassbaender, Irmgard Hartmann-Dressler and Annie Schoonus. During his studies, he made his operatic debut at the Munich Biennale in 1990. He was a member of the NDR Chor from 1992 to 1995.

Mészár was engaged at the Staatstheater Braunschweig in 1995, where he appeared as Sarastro in Mozart's Die Zauberflöte, Don Alfonso in Così fan tutte and Don Basilio in Rossini's Il barbiere di Siviglia, among others. In 1998, he moved to the Theater Münster and in 2007 to the Nationaltheater Weimar. In the production of Wagner's Der Ring des Nibelungen there, he appeared as Fasolt in Das Rheingold, Wotan in Die Walküre, and Hagen in Götterdämmerung. The performances were recorded on DVD in 2008. In 2010, he appeared as Orest in Elektra by Richard Strauss. From 2010, Mészár was a member of the Oper Bonn, and from 2012 the Badisches Staatstheater Karlsruhe, where he appeared as Levi in the world premiere of Avner Dorman's Wahnfried. He performed leading roles, also as a guest at German and Austrian opera houses.

Since 2015, he has performed the roles of Wotan, Wanderer and Gunther in Der Ring in Minden, Wagner's Ring Cycle at the Stadttheater Minden. A reviewer noted how he portrayed the different characters in voice and acting.

In concert, he performed and recorded in 2007 Liszt's oratorio St. Elisabeth about Saint Elisabeth, with Melanie Diener in the title role, other soloists, choirs, and the Staatskapelle Weimar conducted by Carl St. Clair. In 2013, he recorded the first performance in Germany of Bruno Maderna's Requiem, which had been assumed lost for decades. He sang with other soloists, including Kathrin Göring, the MDR Rundfunkchor and the Robert-Schumann-Philharmonie, conducted by Frank Beermann.
