= Gerhard Röthler =

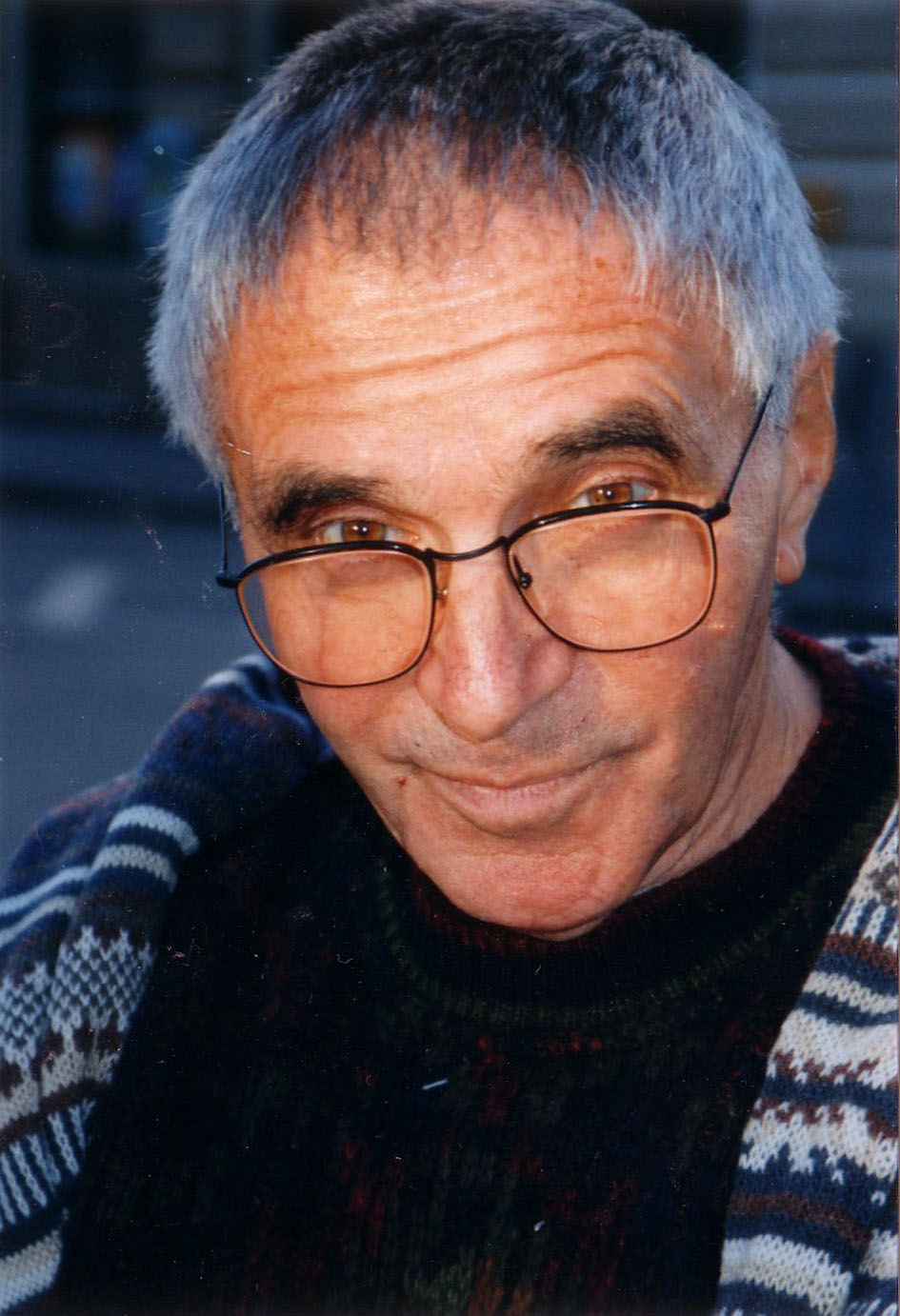
Gerhard Röthler

Gerhard Röthler (29 October 1920 – 18 October 1999) was a professor at the Mozarteum University of Salzburg.

== Biography ==
Röthler was born in Breslau (Wrocław) in the Prussian Province of Lower Silesia. He was given piano lessons from Professor Hirsch-Kaufmann and violin lessons from Elishewath Szépazsy. In 1939 he immigrated to Palestine. He worked as a farm worker as well as gardener and studied double bass.

After engagements at the opera of Tel Aviv and at the Yemenite theatre INBAL, Röthler finished his degree at the conservatories in Cologne and Berlin in 1963. In Berlin he worked as a music therapist at the psychiatric clinic. In 1968 he started teaching at the Mozarteum Salzburg. In 1981 he was appointed to a professorship for cembalo/harpsichord and music theory.

In 1983, Röthler translated the book Playing the Harpsichord. He died in Salzburg.

His son David Röthler worked in Yad Vashem 1993/94 with the Austrian Holocaust Memorial Service.
