= Mozarteum University Salzburg =

University in Salzburg, Austria

Coordinates: 47°48′14″N 13°02′36″E

- Universität Mozarteum Salzburg
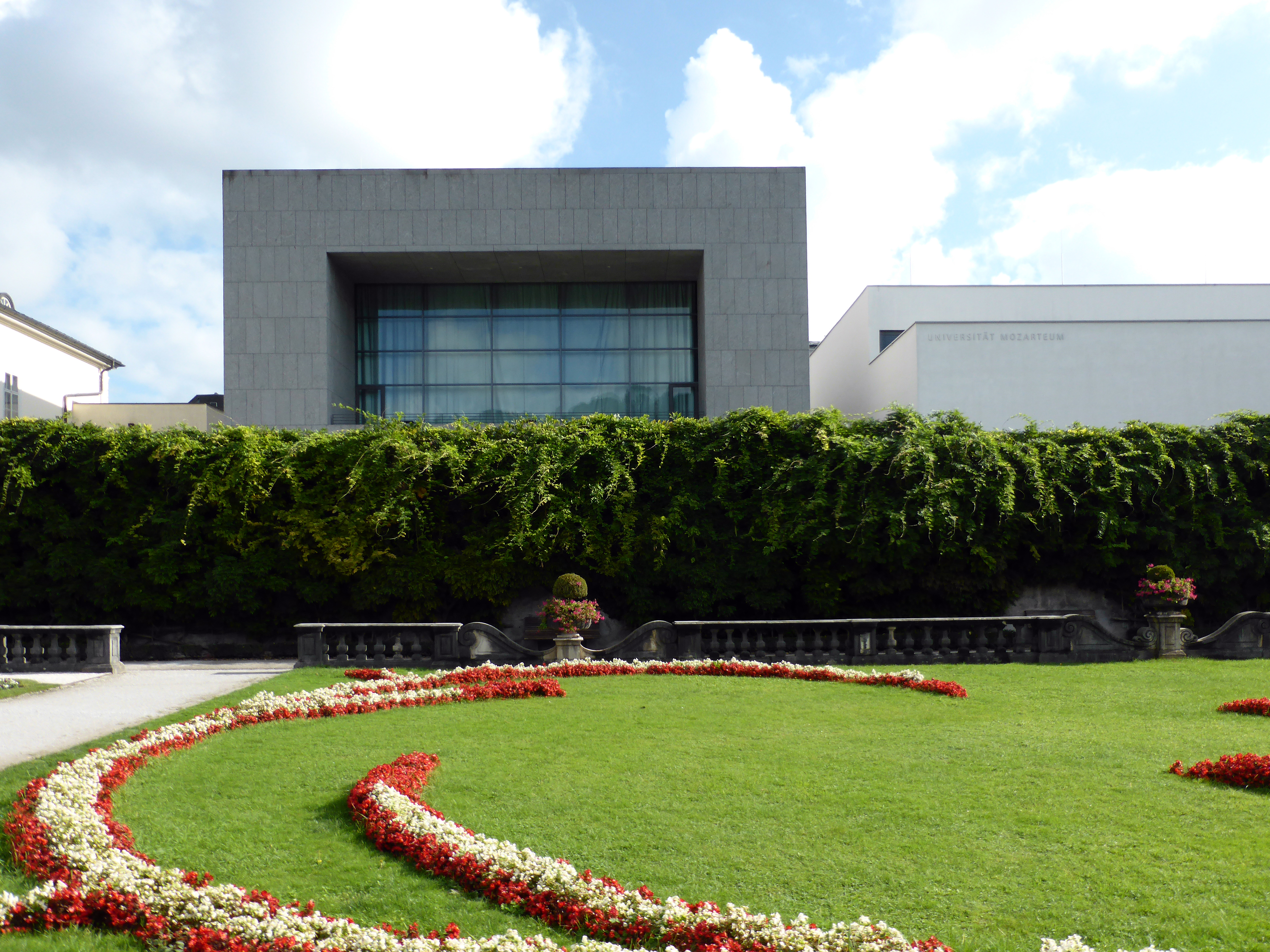
- Main building
- Type: Public art school
- Established: 1841; 185 years ago
- Vice-Chancellor: Elisabeth Gutjahr
- Location: Salzburg municipality, Salzburg State, Austria
- Website: moz.ac.at
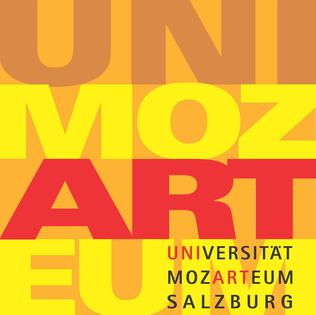

Mozarteum University Salzburg (German: Universität Mozarteum Salzburg), commonly known as the Mozarteum, is a university in Salzburg, Austria specialising in music, drama and directing, music and dance pedagogy, and art education. The term Mozarteum also refers to its predecessor institutions, which existed from 1841 onwards.

It is one of three affiliated but separate entities under the "Mozarteum" name in Salzburg; the others are the International Mozarteum Foundation and its concert hall, and the Mozarteum Orchestra Salzburg. The International Mozarteum Foundation is not part of the University but an independent association that, among other things, organises concerts, archives Mozart autographs, and maintains Mozart museums in Salzburg.

Like its affiliates the University was established in honour of Salzburg-born musician Wolfgang Amadeus Mozart.

== History ==
On 22 April 1841, the "Dommusikverein und Mozarteum" (Cathedral Music Society and Mozarteum) was founded in Salzburg as a conservatory and for the collection of old Mozart documents. In 1880, the initially simple school evolved into the more ambitious Public Music School Mozarteum, the forerunner of today's University. In 1914, the music school was recognised as the "Mozarteum" Conservatory with public rights. Subsequently, after the annexation of Austria, in 1939 the conservatory was called the Reich University Mozarteum, and from 1945, the University of Music and Performing Arts.

In 1953, the institution became the Academy of Music and Performing Arts "Mozarteum" in Salzburg. In 1970, the academy was renamed a university again, this time the University of Music and Performing Arts "Mozarteum" in Salzburg. Since 1998, the institution has been known as the Mozarteum University Salzburg. The more recently rebuilt university main building is at Mirabellplatz 1.

== Training programmes ==
The Mozarteum University offers instruction in playing musical instruments (string, plucked, wind, percussion, and keyboard), voice, Catholic and Protestant church music, conducting, composition, and music theory, each within the fields of performance and music education (teacher training). The teacher training programme includes music education (instrumental/vocal pedagogy studies), as well as music and movement education, art education, crafts, and textile design. Furthermore, there are training programmes in acting, directing, and stage design.

The Mozarteum University has the right to award doctoral degrees (Doctor of Philosophy, PhD). The corresponding doctoral programme is located in the departments of Musicology and Music Education (in Salzburg and Innsbruck).

== Buildings ==
The University's main building is the New Mozarteum at Mirabellplatz 1 in the right half of Salzburg's Old Town (Altstadt). The Mirabell Gardens are directly adjacent. The first New Mozarteum was built in 1978 by adapting Paris von Lodron's Primogeniturpalast and constructing a new building. Due to suspected carcinogenic pollutants, the building was closed in 1998. Extensive renovations began in 2004. The New Mozarteum was reopened in a completely new form in September 2006.

Frohnburg Castle houses a student residence and the Orff Institute for Orff Schulwerk. A branch office with the Department of Music Education has been located in Innsbruck in the House of Music since 2018.

In October 2025, the building in Salzburg's spa gardens next to the Paracelsus Baths (Mozarteum University at the Spa Gardens, UMAK) was opened. Of the total costs of nearly €23 million, more than half came from the federal government.

== University orchestra ==
In the Mozarteum University Symphony Orchestra, students experience renowned conductors, including in the past Nikolaus Harnoncourt, Michael Gielen, Peter Schneider, André Previn, and Cornelius Meister. Since October 2015, Bruno Weil, Reinhard Goebel, and Johannes Kalitzke have led the orchestra and are responsible for conducting students' training.

The current university orchestra should not be confused with the Mozarteum Orchestra Salzburg, the symphony orchestra of the city and state of Salzburg. The latter was originally the orchestra of students from the music school and later the Mozarteum Academy. In 1939, it became an independent orchestra of professional musicians.

== Notable alumni ==
- Barbara Bonney (soprano)
- Marios Joannou Elia (composer and artistic director)
- David Frühwirth (violinist)
- Saskia Giorgini (pianist)
- Ingrid Haebler (pianist)
- Leopold Hager (conductor)
- Angelika Kirchschlager (mezzo soprano)
- Herbert von Karajan (conductor)
- Christiane Karg (soprano)
- Genia Kühmeier (soprano)
- Marjon Lambriks (soprano)
- Giorgi Latso (pianist)
- Erich Leinsdorf (conductor)
- Igor Levit (pianist)
- Kerstin Meyer (mezzo-soprano)
- Nils Mönkemeyer (violist)
- Pier Giorgio Morandi (conductor)
- Alexander Mullenbach (composer and pianist)
- Camilla Nylund (soprano)
- Karola Obermueller (composer)
- Carl Orff (composer)
- Wolfgang Rennert (opera conductor)
- Alice Sara Ott (pianist)
- Irmin Schmidt (conductor)
- Frank Philipp Schlößmann (born 1963), scenic and costume designer
- Rosl Schwaiger (1918–1970), coloratura soprano
- Sarah Traubel (soprano)
- Norma Wendelburg (1918–2016), composer, pianist and academic teacher
- Herbert Willi (born 1956), composer
- Tabea Zimmermann (violist)

== Notable teachers ==
- Barbara Bonney (voice)
- Reinhard Febel (composition)
- Eliot Fisk (guitar)
- Vittorio Ghielmi (viola da gamba)
- Michael Gielen (conducting)
- Pavel Gililov (piano)
- Reinhard Goebel (barock violin, conducting)
- Rico Gulda (piano)
- Veronika Hagen-Di Ronza (viola)
- Leopold Hager (conducting)
- Sheila Jones Harms (voice)
- Nikolaus Harnoncourt (conducting)
- Adriana Hölszky (composition)
- Wolfgang Holzmair (lied and oratorio)
- Josef Maria Horváth (composition and music theory)
- Johannes Kalitzke (conducting of contemporary music)
- Karl-Heinz Kämmerling (piano)
- Angelika Kirchschlager (voice)
- Wilma Lipp (voice)
- Tristan Murail (composition)
- Felix Petyrek (composition)
- Ildikó Raimondi (voice)
- Ruggiero Ricci (violin)
- Gerhard Röthler (harpsichord)
- Jacques Rouvier (piano)
- Heinrich Schiff (cello)
- Otmar Suitner (conducting)
- Laurence Traiger (composition)
- Bruno Weil (conducting)
- Gerhard Wimberger (conducting, composition)
- Duo Tal & Groethuysen (piano)
