= Julia Bauer =

German soprano

- Born: Berlin
- Education: Berlin University of the Arts
- Occupation: Operatic coloratura soprano
- Website: julia-bauer.com

Julia Bauer is a German operatic coloratura soprano who has appeared at major opera houses and also in concert and recital. She has had leading roles such as Zerbinetta and Lulu, and was Freia, Helmwige, Forest Bird, Woglinde and Third Norn in Der Ring in Minden.

== Career ==
Born in Berlin, Bauer studied voice at the Berlin University of the Arts, graduating with distinction. She made her stage debut in the 1999/2000 season at the Staatstheater Cottbus. She has performed freelance since 2003, appearing as Adele in Die Fledermaus by Johann Strauss at the Volksoper in Vienna, and at the Semperoper in Dresden, the Staatsoper Hannover, and the Staatsoper Berlin, among others. She performed at the Tyrolean State Theatre as Blonde in Mozart's Die Entführung aus dem Serail and at the Oregon Bach Festival as Lisette in the world premiere of Mendelssohn's Der Onkel aus Boston, conducted by Helmuth Rilling. In 2008, she appeared as Ännchen in Weber's Der Freischütz at the New National Theatre Tokyo. She was the Queen of the Night in Mozart's Die Zauberflöte at the Oper Leipzig, the Komische Oper Berlin, and the English National Opera. In 2009, she appeared as the 12-year-old Maria in the first German production of Love and Other Demons by Peter Eötvös at the Oper Chemnitz, conducted by Frank Beermann. A review noted her coloratura voice, at times childlike and then angelic, and her convincing acting. In her debut as Lakmé at the Lausanne Opera, Bauer was praised as a "Lakmé to remember" and as a "high class Lakmé".

At the Aalto Theatre in Essen, she appeared as Aminta in Die schweigsame Frau and as Zerbinetta in Ariadne auf Naxos, both by Richard Strauss, and in the title role of Alban Berg's Lulu. A review described her performance as a tender and elegant woman, with a girlish speaking voice as often prescribed by the composer, and a light agile soprano, with ethereal moments when the character seems not real but an artwork ("ganz Kunst").

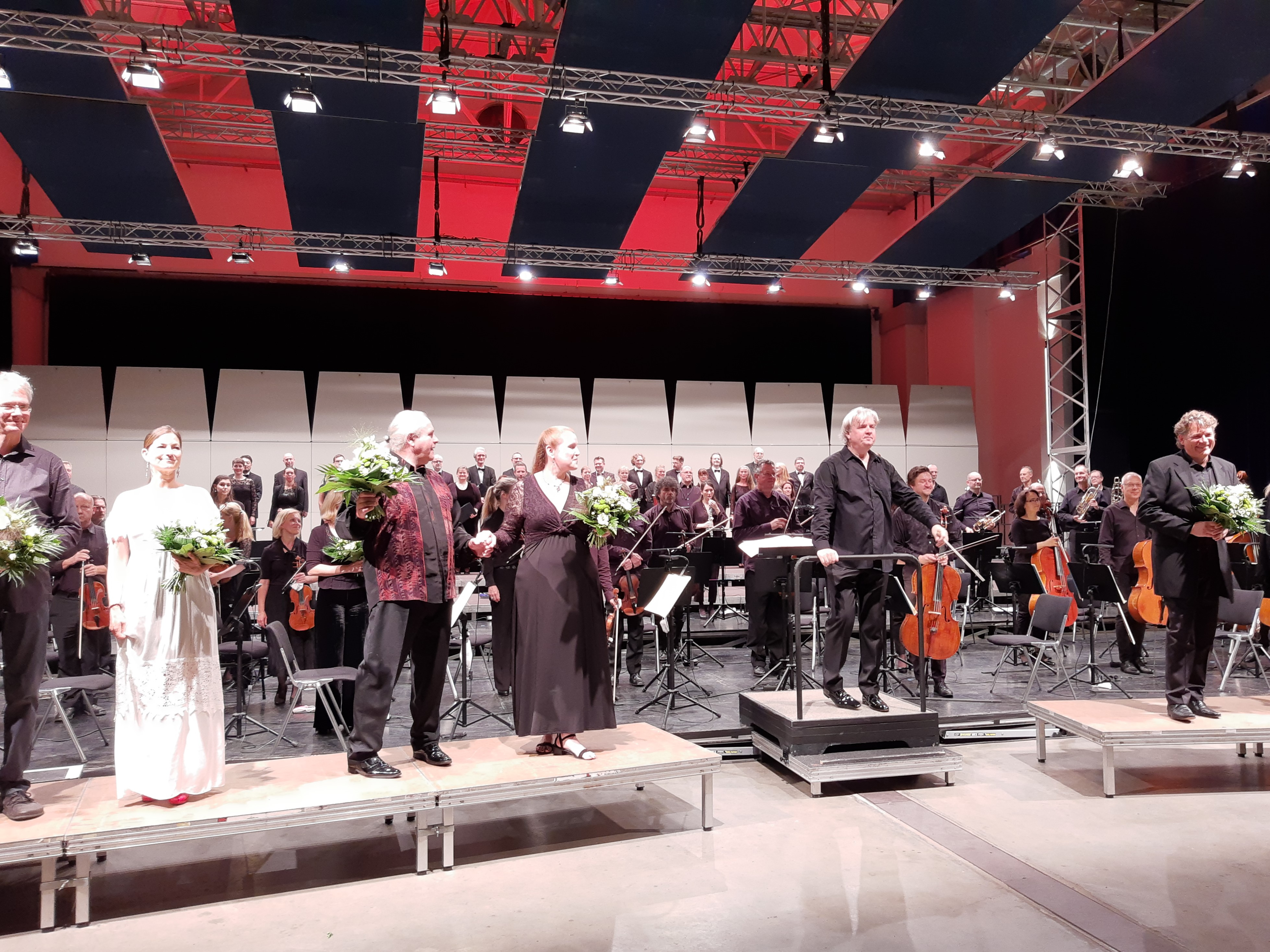
As Marzelline, in white dress, after a concert performance of Fidelio, 2021

She appeared as Maria in the world premiere of Wunderzaichen by Mark Andre at the Staatsoper Stuttgart. In the project Der Ring in Minden, she performed as Freia, Helmwige, Forest Bird, Woglinde and Third Norn. Her bird-like movements as the Forest Bird were noted by critics, as well as her portrayal of Freia with a bright voice.

On 10 July 2021, Bauer appeared as Marzelline in Beethoven's Fidelio in a concert performance at the Alfred Fischer Hall in Hamm as part of the KlassikSommer Hamm festival. Frank Beermann conducted the Nordwestdeutsche Philharmonie, choir and soloists.

Bauer also sings a broad repertoire of lieder and oratorios, including Handel's Messiah in Budapest and the soprano part in Beethoven's Ninth Symphony at the Liceu in Barcelona conducted by Riccardo Chailly. She took part in a performance of Stockhausen's Momente with the Ensemble interconteporain conducted by Péter Eötvös.
