= Die schweigsame Frau =

1935 opera by Richard Strauss

- Opera by Richard Strauss
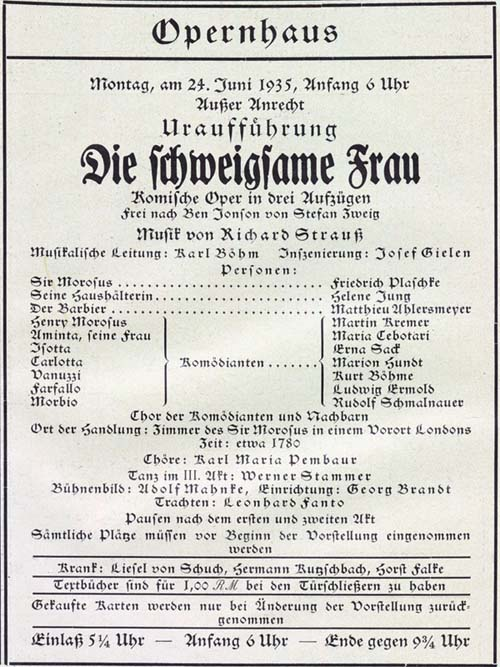
- Playbill of the world premiere
- Librettist: Stefan Zweig
- Language: German
- Based on: Ben Jonson's Epicœne, or The Silent Woman (1609)
- Premiere: 24 June 1935; Semperoper, Dresden

Die schweigsame Frau (The Silent Woman), Op. 80, is a 1935 comic opera in three acts by Richard Strauss to a libretto by Stefan Zweig after Ben Jonson's 1609 comedy Epicœne, or The Silent Woman.

== Composition history ==
Since Elektra and Der Rosenkavalier, with only the exception of Intermezzo, all previous operas by Strauss were based on libretti by Hugo von Hofmannsthal, who died in 1929. Stefan Zweig, who was then a celebrated author, had never met Strauss, who was his senior by 17 years. In his autobiography The World of Yesterday, Zweig describes how Strauss got in touch with him after Hofmannsthal's death to ask him to write a libretto for a new opera. Zweig chose a theme from Ben Jonson.

== Politics of the opera ==
Strauss was seen as an important icon of German music by the Nazis, who had seized power in Germany in April 1933. Strauss himself co-operated with the Nazis and became the president of the Reichsmusikkammer in November 1933. Zweig knew Strauss well through their collaboration and later wrote:

to be co-operative with the national socialists was furthermore of vital interest to him, because in the national socialist sense he was very much in the red. His son had married a Jewess and thus he feared that his grandchildren, whom he loved above all else, would be excluded as scum from the schools; his earlier operas tainted through the half-Jew Hugo von Hofmannsthal; his publisher was a Jew. Therefore, to him it seemed more and more imperative to create support and security for himself, and he did it most perseveringly.

The fact that Zweig was a Jew was causing potential problems for the performance of the opera: in the summer of 1934 the Nazi press began to attack Strauss on this issue. Zweig recounts in his autobiography that Strauss refused to withdraw the opera and even insisted that Zweig's authorship of the libretto be credited; the first performance in Dresden was authorized by Hitler himself. Subsequent research has shown that Zweig's account is largely correct. We now know that there was an internal power struggle going on within the Nazi government. Joseph Goebbels wanted to use Strauss's international reputation and was willing to relax the rule against works with non-Aryan artists. However, Alfred Rosenberg was more critical of Strauss's unsoundness on the "Jewish question" and wanted to remove Strauss from his position and replace him with party member Peter Raabe. Goebbels took the matter to Hitler, who initially ruled in his favour. However, the Gestapo had been intercepting the correspondence between Strauss and Zweig, in which Strauss had been candid about his critical views of the Nazi regime and his role in it. This letter was shown to Hitler, who then changed his mind. The opera was allowed to run for three performances and then banned. On 6 July 1935, Strauss was visited at his home by a Nazi official sent by Goebbels and told to resign from his position as president of the Reichsmusikkammer on grounds of "ill health", less than two years after he had taken up the post. He was replaced by Peter Raabe, who remained in place until the fall of the Nazi regime. Although banned in Germany, the opera was performed a few times abroad, including in Milan, Graz, Prague and Zürich. This would not be the first time one of his operas had been banned: Kaiser Wilhelm had banned Feuersnot in 1902. Indeed, the propensity of totalitarian regimes to ban operas was not limited to Germany: a few months later in early 1936 Dmitri Shostakovich's opera Lady Macbeth of Mtsensk was banned by the Soviet regime. Zweig and Strauss continued to work together secretly (with Joseph Gregor), mainly on the libretto for the opera Friedenstag which was premiered in 1938. The story was almost wholly Zweig's, but the ideal of pacifism which it embodied was dear to both.

Strauss outlived the Nazi regime by four years and was happy when the opera was revived shortly after the end of the war. He wrote to Joseph Keilberth, the director of the Dresden Opera House where the opera was first revived: "Now, after ten years, the honorable Sir Morosus has been liberated from the concentration camp of the Reichstheaterkammer and has returned to his native town, where twelve years ago I had a lot of trouble to get the name of the librettist on the program". Stefan Zweig never heard the opera performed. He had moved from his native Austria to England in 1934 after the Nazis came to power in Germany (although he did visit Austria until the Anschluss in 1938). In 1940, soon after the outbreak of war, he moved to the US and then to Brazil. Depressed by the growth of intolerance, authoritarianism, and Nazism, feeling hopeless for the future for humanity, he committed suicide on 23 February 1942.

== Performance history ==
It was first performed at the Dresden Semperoper on 24 June 1935, conducted by Karl Böhm. After the fall of the Nazi regime, the opera was revived in Dresden (1946) followed by Berlin, Munich and Wiesbaden.

Outside Germany, the work was produced in February 1936 at Graz in Austria (attended by his son and daughter-in-law, Franz and Alice), in Prague on 8 June conducted by George Szell and in Zürich in October 1942 (with Strauss attending the performance on 18 October). The work had its United States premiere at the New York City Opera on 7 October 1958. It was performed at the Santa Fe Opera in 1987 and 1991, and also at Garsington Opera in 2003. In Britain, the Royal Opera House, London, presented the work in English with the UK premiere on 20 November 1961 and the opera formed part of the Glyndebourne festival in 1977 and 1979. More recently, there were productions at the Dresden Semperoper in 2010 and the Bavarian State Opera, Munich, in 2010, 2014, 2015, and 2017. On 22–24 July 2016 Pittsburgh Festival Opera put on two performances sung in English. In July 2022, the Richard B. Fisher Center for the Performing Arts at Bard College presented five performances in the original German, Leon Botstein conducting the American Symphony Orchestra.

== Roles ==
Roles, voice types, premiere cast
Role	Voice type	Premiere, 24 June 1935 Conductor: Karl Böhm
Sir Morosus, a retired admiral	bass	Friedrich Plaschke
Widow Zimmerlein, his housekeeper	contralto	Helene Jung
Schneidebart, a barber	high baritone	Mathieu Ahlersmeyer
Henry Morosus, nephew of the admiral	high tenor	Martin Kremer
Aminta, his wife	coloratura soprano	Maria Cebotari
Isotta, opera singer	coloratura soprano	Erna Sack
Carlotta, opera singer	mezzo-soprano	Maria Hundt
Morbio, opera singer	baritone	Rudolf Schmalnauer
Vanuzzi, opera singer	basso profondo	Kurt Böhme
Farfallo, opera singer	basso profondo	Ludwig Ermold
The parrot	spoken	
Other actors, neighbors

== Synopsis ==
Setting: a room in Sir Morosus' house in a London suburb, around 1760.

=== Act 1 ===
Retired naval captain Sir John Morosus is very intolerant of noise after having survived an explosion on his ship. For some years he has been retired and living with his housekeeper who looks after him well, although he finds her chatter annoying. His barber arrives and after an argument with the housekeeper that disturbs Morosus, tries to calm down the Captain. He tells Captain Morosus that he should take a quiet young woman. At first Morosus is skeptical: is not a quiet woman like sea without salt? The barber assures him that he knows a dozen "quiet doves" who would want to marry an honorable man like him. Morosus starts to warm to the idea, when suddenly his long-lost nephew Henry appears. He is warmly welcomed: Morosus dismisses the idea of marriage and makes Henry his "son and heir". However, when Henry reveals that he, his wife Aminta and his friends are an opera troupe, Morosus reacts in horror particularly to the idea that Aminta is an opera singer. The captain throws the opera troupe out of his house and disinherits Henry. He instructs the barber to seek a silent woman for him to be his wife the very next day and then retires to bed. The barber reveals to the troupe how rich Morosus is ("sixty, seventy thousand pounds"). Aminta says that she will not come between Henry and his inheritance and offers to leave Henry. Henry tells Aminta that he cannot live without her even if it means losing his inheritance. The Barber has an idea. What if the opera troupe acts out a drama in which the ladies of the troupe have the roles of the prospective brides and they enact a sham marriage? The Bride will then become very noisy and they will act out the divorce. Henry likes the idea: his uncle has insulted the troupe, so they will show him their abilities "and who is the fool shall be fooled". The scene ends with a glorious celebration of the wonderful plan.

=== Act 2 ===
The housekeeper helps Morosus put on his finest dress-jacket. The Barber arrives and reassures the captain that he has arranged all of the details for the marriage ceremony. He then introduces the three potential brides. Carlotta stands forward acting as "Katherine" a simple country girl. Morosus is not keen: she has spent too much time with calves and become one herself. The Barber next introduces Isotta, playing the role of noble lady educated in a wide range of subjects. Morosus is not impressed by this and is suspicious of her ability to play the lute. Lastly, the Barber introduces Aminta acting as the modest and shy "Timidia". Morosus is quite captivated by "Timidia" and tells the barber "she is the one" and orders him to get the priest and notary for the marriage ceremony. Vanuzzi and Morbio act out the roles of parson and notary and the sham marriage takes place. Farfallo arrives with the rest of the troupe playing sailors who have come to celebrate the marriage, making a lot of noise. Morosus is driven mad by the noise and ejects them from the house. Aminta has become quite touched by the genuine love of Morosus, who wants to know why she seems troubled. Eventually, she has to carry out the barber’s plan and starts shouting at Morosus in feigned anger. She wreaks havoc in the house pulling down the curtains and throws some of the captains most precious possessions onto the floor ("away with this junk"). Then Henry arrives to save the day. He forcefully deals with Timidia, and assures his uncle that he will deal with everything. A grateful Morosus thanks Henry: he has survived many sea battles and hurricanes, but would not stand a chance against someone like Timidia. Henry sends the captain off to bed, where he dozes off. Now alone, Aminta and Henry then sing of their love for each other. Morosus awakes and calls down: "is everything all right?" "Yes", says Henry. Morosus falls back asleep with a deep sigh which counterpoints with Aminta’s sighs of love as the scene closes.

=== Act 3 ===
The next day Aminta has hired "craftsmen" who make noises as they hammer nails and slam doors. There is a noisy parrot who squawks. In addition, she has appointed a pianist (Farfallo) and a singing teacher (Henry) who practice Monteverdi’s "L’incoronaziane di Poppea" with her. The captain appears and is completely devastated. The Barber walks in and introduces a "Lord Chief Justice" (Vanuzzi) and "Two lawyers" (Morbio and Farfallo) who discuss the prospective divorce. However, "Timidia" contests the divorce and they reject every case for divorce. The barber argues that she has had relations before the marriage to Sir John and the two "honorable ladies" (Isotta and Carlotta) attest to this. The Barber also introduces a "witness" (Henry) who attests that he has had carnal relations with Timidia. Morosus scents victory and is about to celebrate when the lawyers raise a further barrier to divorce: the marriage agreement did not stipulate the virginity of the bride, so "you will have to keep her now". Morosus is close to a nervous breakdown. Henry calls an end to the charade and all stop acting and all are revealed as their true characters. Aminta asks the captain's pardon. After the captain realizes he has been fooled his initial anger turns to laughter as he sees the funny side of a troupe of actors outwitting him. Overjoyed, he makes peace with the troupe of actors as they leave and gives his blessing to Henry and Aminta’s union and proclaims Henry again as his heir. He is pleased with himself and the world after his narrow escape and has at last found the peace he has longed for. The opera ends with a monologue of Morosus: " A rare delight it is to find a silent, beautiful girl, but it is more delightful when she belongs to another man".

== Stefan Zweig's adaptation of Ben Jonson ==
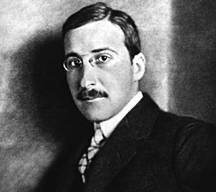
Stefan Zweig

The story line of an old man marrying a young woman who turns out rather differently to what he expected has its roots in classical antiquity: the play Casina by Plautus (251–184 B.C.) being an early example. Perhaps the closest progenitor is from the Declamatio Sexta, a Latin translation of mythological themes from the Greek sophist Libanius.

Jonson's comedy had been used before as the basis for an opera: in 1800 Antonio Salieri's Angiolina ossia Il Matrimonio, and in 1810 Stefano Pavesi wrote the opera Ser Marcantonio which in turn formed the basis for Donizetti's Don Pasquale with characters based upon the Commedia dell'arte (thus Morose becomes Don Pasquale who is based on Pantalone). Later still, in 1930 there was Mark Lothar's Lord Spleen (in German).

Zweig had discovered Ben Jonson sometime earlier, and had successfully adapted Jonson's Volpone for the German stage prior to being approached by Strauss for a libretto. Zweig used a German translation of Epicœne by Ludwig Tieck in 1800, with the subtitle Das stumme Mädchen or Das stille Frauenzimmer depending on the edition.

Zweig's libretto makes several major changes to Jonson's play. The most important is perhaps the character of Sir Morosus. In Jonson, "Morose" is not a sea captain, but merely a rich old man with a dislike of noise. Furthermore, Morose dislikes his nephew (Sir Dauphine) and plans to disinherit him through the marriage. Zweig on the other hand develops a much more sympathetic character. Sir Morosus is a retired naval captain with a distinguished career: the Barber explains to the others that an explosion on ship caused his aversion to noise (and his capture of Spanish galleons the source of his wealth). Sir Morosus also dismisses the barber's initial suggestion of marrying a younger woman: he is too old and besides, he doubts the existence of a "silent woman". However, the Barber's arguments do lead him to see the emptiness of living alone:

Every Day, every night with oneself at home,
No son, no heir, no nephew, no friend,
No-one in the world on whom to attend.
Yes that would be good.
To know there is someone for whom one is real, for whom one breathes, to whom one confesses,
Someone for whom one lives and for whom one dies,
And is there when one grows cold to close one's eyes and fold one's hands,
Yes that would be good.

Morosus also loves his nephew Henry (whom he had thought dead): he would be happy to live with Henry and treat him as his son. When Henry arrives, Sir Morosus says: "My house, my fortune are his. Everything. Now I do not need a bride...neither mute or silent."

He disinherits Henry in a fit of anger when he realizes Henry is married to an opera singer and decides to follow the Barber's earlier advice and marry a silent woman. However, even after he falls in love with "Timidia", he asks her if she really wants marriage: he is too old for her. Midway in act 2 before the "marriage" he advises Aminta to think carefully:

Child, listen to me!
An old man is only half a man. His best half is in the past.
His eye has long become sated with what he has seen, his heart is tired and beats softly.

There is a frost deep in his blood and it lames the joy of living,
And because he himself is stiff and cold, the entire world seems old.
There is only one thing he has over youth: An old man is better able to be thankful."

After the marriage, he displays such tenderness and concern that Aminta is very moved and wishes she did not have to go through the charade.

The second major change is that in Jonson, the silent woman "Epicœne" is in fact a boy. Zweig has the silent woman as Henry's wife Aminta. Aminta herself is a major character in the opera. She shows her love and devotion to Henry by offering to leave Henry so that he can inherit his uncle's wealth. She also wants to love Sir Morosus as a father-in-law and finds it difficult to treat him badly. At the heart of act 2, just before the sham marriage, "Timidia" speaks to Morosus:

Oh Lord, I swear by the holy sacrament: I feel I could be truly fond of you
As one piously loves and honours a father, as one who has given me the best in life.
Whatever I do, even if at first it seems strangely hostile
I swear to you: I am doing it solely for your own good,
And if I can free you from ill-humor,
I will be the happiest wife on earth.

Henry himself is also very different from Jonson's heartless nephew: he loves his uncle, seeking his approval and is the one who calls the charade to an end when he sees how much his uncle is suffering. The Barber is also very different: in Jonson he is an accomplice of the nephew. For Zweig, the Barber is a good person who thinks well of Sir Morosus and is a benign schemer who drives the plot along, much like Mozart's barber Figaro. After the disinheritance scene in act 1, he explains to Henry and the others "He (Morosus) is a thoroughly honest fellow with the best heart in the country." The planned deception of the marriage comes about as a way to "wean Sir John from his taste for marriage and return [Henry's] inheritance to [him] ... it's going to take a lot of effort to soap him up and ... cut this tuft of foolishness off".

Zweig also introduces a whole new dimension into the dialogue which is the play on truth, perception and illusion. For the whole of act two and three until the charade ends, Morosus is in a world of illusion. The words spoken by the "characters" such as "Timidia" have a double layer of meaning: the meaning within the charade and the truthful meaning in reality which is hidden from Morosus (the audience can appreciate both). Thus for example, in the divorce case in act 3, the issue is raised of "Timidia" having had relations with men other than Sir Morosus. Carlotta and Isotta are brought in as witnesses and swear that "Timidia" has had such relations. Aminta responds "Never have I disgraced the honor of my marriage." Likewise when the gentleman (Henry in disguise) is bought in as a witness, he says he has had "carnal relations" with Timidia, to which she again replies "I have belonged to no other man than my husband." These statements are all true when applied to Aminta, but appear to mean something else when spoken by Timidia.

The ending is rather different from Jonson's, where when Epicœne is revealed to be a boy, where a shamed Morose exits and his nephew Dauphine remarks dismissively "I'll not trouble you, till you trouble me with your funeral, which I care not how soon it come." In Zweig's libretto, the charade has served a benign purpose: Morosus realizes his folly and states "You did the right thing, rag a fool and thrash his stupidity." Morosus now has all he wants: a loving nephew as his heir, an admiring "daughter in law" and most of all the peace and quiet he has been seeking. Thus the comedy is more about the transformation of the old man rather as in Charles Dickens's A Christmas Carol where the fantastical events transform Scrooge. Sir Morosus has the final word in an aria which has become the best known part of the opera "Wie schön ist doch die Musik".

== Instrumentation ==
The opera uses a large orchestra with the following instrumentation:

- 3 flutes, piccolo, 2 oboes, English horn, D-clarinet, 2 clarinets in B-flat and A, bass clarinet, 3 bassoons, contrabassoon
- 4 French horns, 3 trumpets, 3 trombones, tuba
- Timpani, glockenspiel, xylophone, 4 large bells, 1 set of small bells, snare drum, bass drum, 1 pair of crash cymbals, suspended cymbal, tam-tam (gong), triangle, tambourine, rattle, 1 pair of castanets
- Celesta, harp, harpsichord
- 14 1st violins, 12 2nd violins, 8 violas, 8 cellos, 6 double basses
- Stage band: 2 bagpipes, 3 trumpets, 2 snare drums, organ

== Recordings ==
All the recordings are of cut versions of the opera except for the 1977 one led by Marek Janowski. In staged performances cuts of 25 to 30% of the music are not uncommon. The full running time is about 3 hours.

Year	Cast: Aminta, Housekeeper, Henry, Schneidebart, Morosus	Conductor, chorus and orchestra	Label
1959, August 8 (not August 6 as shown), live in Salzburg	Hilde Güden, Georgine von Milinkovič, Fritz Wunderlich, Hermann Prey, Hans Hotter	Karl Böhm, Chorus of the Vienna State Opera, Vienna Philharmonic	CD: Deutsche Grammophon; Cat: DG 445 335–2
1971, July 14, live in Munich	Reri Grist, Martha Mödl, Donald Grobe, Barry McDaniel, Kurt Böhme	Wolfgang Sawallisch, Chorus of Bavarian State Opera, Bavarian State Orchestra	CD: Orfeo, Cat: C 516992 I
1976 and 1977, studio recording in Lukaskirche, Dresden	Jeanette Scovotti, Annelies Burmeister, Eberhard Büchner, Wolfgang Schöne, Theo Adam	Marek Janowski, Dresden State Opera Chorus, Staatskapelle Dresden	CD: Testament; Cat: CMS 566033–2
2012, May 7–12, studio recording in Opernhaus Chemnitz	Julia Bauer, Monika Straube, Bernhard Berchtold, Andreas Kindschuh, Franz Hawlata	Frank Beermann, Chorus of Chemnitz Opera, Robert-Schumann Philharmonie	CD: CPO; Cat: CPO 777 757–2

The closing monologue "Wie schön ist doch die Musik" has been recorded by many basses and bass baritones, including Hans Hotter, Kurt Moll, Thomas Quasthoff, and Matti Salminen. The last three notes of this aria are three sustained B flats (B♭_{2}). When this aria is performed in recital, basses who have the note sometimes sing the last of the three down an octave, which is B♭_{1} (e.g., Matti Salminen). However, this is not indicated as an option in the score.
