= Kathrin Göring =

German singer

- Occupation: Operatic mezzo-soprano
- Organizations: Oper Leipzig
- Website: www.kathrin-goering.de

Kathrin Göring is a German operatic mezzo-soprano, a member of the Oper Leipzig who has appeared at other major opera houses, also in concert and recital, and made recordings. She has appeared in Leipzig in leading roles such as Bizet's Carmen and Wagner's Parsifal. She sang both Fricka and Waltraute in Der Ring in Minden.

== Life ==
Göring studied voice at the Musikhochschule Leipzig with Jitka Kovariková and at the Musikhochschule Dresden with Hartmut Zabel. Even during her studies, she appeared on stage as Hänsel in Humperdinck's Hänsel und Gretel and in the title role of Giles Swayne's Le nozze di Cherubino. She has been a member of the Oper Leipzig since the 2002/03 season, where she appeared as Kundry in Wagner's Parsifal, the Mother in Hänsel und Gretel, the Foreign Princess in Dvořák's Rusalka, in the title role of Bizet's Carmen and as Clairon in Capriccio by Richard Strauss, among others. She has appeared there in Wagner's Der Ring des Nibelungen in several roles, as the goddess Fricka and the Rhinemaiden Wellgunde in Das Rheingold, as Fricka and the Valkyrie Waltraute in Die Walküre, and as Waltraute and the Second Norn in Götterdämmerung. In the project Der Ring in Minden, she also appeared as Fricka in Das Rheingold and Die Walküre, and as Waltraute in Die Walküre and Götterdämmerung. Reviews in Online Musik Magazin noted her rich voice and called her scene warning Brünnhilde in Götterdämmerung a musical highlight with intense dramatic acting. Göring sang as a guest at opera houses including the Deutsche Oper Berlin, Deutsche Oper am Rhein, Aalto Theater in Essen, Theater Chemnitz, Theater Kiel and Theater Bremen.

Göring sings a broad repertoire of lieder and oratorios. In 2013, she appeared in the first performance in Germany and the first recording of Bruno Maderna's Requiem, which had been assumed lost for decades. She sang with other soloists including Renatus Mészár, the MDR Rundfunkchor, and the Robert-Schumann-Philharmonie, conducted by Frank Beermann.
