= Gerd Heinz =

German actor and stage director

- Born: 21 September 1940 (age 85); Aachen, Germany
- Education: Cologne University
- Occupations: Actor; Stage director; Intendant; Academic teacher
- Organizations: Theater Aachen; Musikhochschule Hamburg; Staatstheater Darmstadt; Thalia Theater; Schauspielhaus Zürich; Hochschule für Musik Freiburg
- Awards: E. T. A.-Hoffmann-Kreisler-Preis
- Website: www.gerd-heinz.de

Gerd Heinz (born 21 September 1940) is a German stage, film and television actor and a stage director. He was also active as an academic teacher and theatre manager (Intendant). From 1989, he turned more towards opera. He staged a drama by Thomas Bernhard at the Salzburg Festival in 2016, and Der Ring in Minden, Wagner's Der Ring des Nibelungen from 2015 to 2018.

== Career ==
Born in Aachen, Heinz attended the Kaiser-Karls-Gymnasium and founded a theatre group there, Die Stufe. He studied German, philosophy and art history at the University of Cologne. At the same time, he pursued training as an actor and stage director at the Schauspielschule der Keller in Cologne.

Heinz began work at the Theater Aachen in 1962, where he played roles such as Tasso and Cyrano de Bergerac. He worked at several theatres, both as an actor and a stage director. He was a professor at the Musikhochschule Hamburg from 1968 to 1978, at times directing the opera class. He became director of drama at the Staatstheater Darmstadt in 1970. From 1973, he regularly directed at the Thalia Theater in Hamburg. He has also worked as an actor in film and television.

From 1982, Heinz was Intendant at the Schauspielhaus Zürich for seven years. In 1997, he was appointed a professor at the Hochschule für Musik Freiburg. Since 2008, he has worked as a freelance director. At the Salzburg Festival in 2016, he staged Thomas Bernhard's drama Der Ignorant und der Wahnsinnige with Sven-Eric Bechtolf in the leading role. At the Stadttheater Minden, he staged Wagner's Der Ring des Nibelungen in four consecutive years from 2015 to 2018, concluded by two complete cycles in 2019. A reviewer noted how he achieved great effect by using props sparingly and making efficient use of the limited space, focusing on the psychological aspects of the characters and their relationships.

In 2008, Heinz received the E. T. A.-Hoffmann-Kreisler-Preis.

== Literature ==
- Andreas Kotte, ed. (2005). "Gerd Heinz". Theaterlexikon der Schweiz / Dictionnaire du théâtre en Suisse / Dizionario Teatrale Svizzero / Lexicon da teater svizzer [Theater Dictionary of Switzerland]. Vol. 2. Zürich: Chronos. pp. 817–818. ISBN 978-3-0340-0715-3. LCCN 2007423414. OCLC 62309181.
