= Jeff Martin (tenor) =

American operatic tenor

- Education: Westminster Choir College; Cincinnati University
- Occupation: Operatic tenor

Jeff Martin is an American operatic tenor who made a career based in Germany, singing at international opera houses and concert halls. Focused on character roles, he has appeared as Mime in Wagner's Der Ring des Nibelungen and Herod in Salome by Richard Strauss, and appeared in several world premieres.

== Career ==
Martin studied voice at Westminster Choir College and Cincinnati University.

Based in Germany, Martin appeared as Herod in Salome by Richard Strauss at the Opernhaus Dortmund in 2007. A reviewer noted his precise and sharp character tenor. He performed the role of Pedrillo in Mozart's Die Entführung aus dem Serail at the Staatstheater Nürnberg in 2008, conducted by Christof Prick. He appeared at the Bolshoi Theatre in Moscow, in 2011 as the Astrologer in The Golden Cockerel, conducted by Vassily Sinaisky and directed by Kirill Serebrennikov, in a production broadcast in Europe. In 2012, he performed there as Valzacchi in Der Rosenkavalier by Richard Strauss, directed by Stephen Lawless. He appeared as Reb Alter in the German premiere of Mieczyslaw Weinberg's Wir gratulieren! in a concert version for chamber orchestra at the Konzerthaus Berlin in 2012. He took part in several world premieres, as the Inquisitor in Francesco Filidei's Giordano Bruno in Paris, as Bertolt Brecht in Michel Tabachnik's Benjamin, dernière nuit at the Opéra de Lyon and in Nana Forte's Paradies oder nach Eden at the Vorarlberger Landestheater in Bregenz. He appeared as Mime in Wagner's Das Rheingold and Siegfried in the project Der Ring in Minden, completed in 2019. He has appeared at opera houses including the Bavarian State Opera, Staatsoper Stuttgart, the Semperoper in Dresden, the Hamburgische Staatsoper, Oper Köln, Opéra national du Rhin in Strasbourg and Nationaltheater Mannheim.

In concert, he performed as the Evangelist in Bach's St Matthew Passion, among others.
