= Eleonore Büning =

German music journalist and writer

- Born: Elisabeth Eleonore Bauer; 2 January 1952 (age 74); Frankfurt am Main, West Germany
- Education: Free University of Berlin
- Occupation: Music journalist
- Organizations: Frankfurter Allgemeine Zeitung

Elisabeth Eleonore Büning (née Bauer; born 2 January 1952) is a German music journalist and writer, known for her opera reviews in the Frankfurter Allgemeine Zeitung.

== Early life and education ==
Elisabeth Eleonore Bauer was born in Frankfurt am Main and raised in Bonn. She attended the Elly-Heuss-Knapp-Gymnasium, where she graduated in 1970. She took up studies in music, theatre and literature at the Free University of Berlin. She completed several internships for music therapy at the University Hospital of the Medizinische Hochschule Hannover and gave music lessons.

== Writing career ==
Since 1978, Büning has written essays for music journals. In 1989, she put forward a dissertation titled A. B. Marx und Beethoven in der Berliner Allgemeinen Musikalischen Zeitung (1824–1830), in which she examined the origins of Beethoven. It was published under the title Wie Beethoven auf den Sockel kam, in 1992.

From 1997 to 2018, Büning has been writing for the Frankfurter Allgemeine Zeitung, as an editor in the features section of the Frankfurter Allgemeine Sonntagszeitung since 2008. In addition, she presents music programs such as Klassikforum on WDR 3. From November 2011 to 2022, Büning has chaired Prize of the German Record Critics (PdSK). Today she is a member of the "Jury Oper I (Barock bis Belcanto)".

== Opera ==
Büning is an observer of the international opera scene, especially of works by Richard Wagner. She wrote in 2013 in her obituary of Patrice Chéreau, who had staged the Jahrhundertring for the centenary of the Bayreuth Festival, that the French team revolutionised the understanding of Wagner in Germany. She has followed the Wagner project in Minden with the Nordwestdeutsche Philharmonie. Comparing a production of Tristan und Isolde in 2012 at the small house to international stagings, she noted that it restored sensuality and a dream-like quality to Wagner's work ("Wann haben wir so etwas zum letzten Mal gesehen, wenn nicht im Traum?"). In her review of the 2016 Bayreuth production of the same work, staged by Katharina Wagner and conducted by Christian Thielemann, she devoted a long section to an analysis of the mixture of sounds in the Bayreuth Festival Theatre.

== Selected works ==
She published Wie Beethoven auf den Sockel kam. Die Entstehung eines musikalischen Mythos., exploring how Ludwig van Beethoven arrived at cult status. Talks about classical music with the baritone Dietrich Fischer-Dieskau appeared as Musik im Gespräch. Streifzüge durch die Klassik. in 2003. She was among the authors of two publications by the Zeitverlag which also publishes the weekly Die Zeit, dealing with the life and music of the pianist Maurizio Pollini, and with the Alban Berg Quartett.

- Elisabeth Eleonore Bauer: Wie Beethoven auf den Sockel kam. Die Entstehung eines musikalischen Mythos. J. B. Metzler, Stuttgart 1992, ISBN 3-476-00849-5
- Dietrich Fischer-Dieskau, Eleonore Büning: Musik im Gespräch. Streifzüge durch die Klassik. Propyläen, München 2003, ISBN 3-549-07178-7
- Eleonore Büning, Claus Spahn: Maurizio Pollini. Leben und Musik des großen Pianisten. Zeitverlag Bucerius, Hamburg 2007 (ZEIT-Klassik Edition 13), ISBN 3-476-02213-7
- Eleonore Büning, Claus Spahn: Alban Berg Quartett. Biografie und Musik des berühmten Ensembles. Zeitverlag Bucerius, Hamburg 2007 (ZEIT-Klassik Edition 16), ISBN 978-3-476-02216-5
- Eleonore Büning: Sprechen wir über Beethoven. Ein Musikverführer. Benevento Verlag, Salzburg 2018, ISBN 978-3-7109-0050-1
- Eleonore Büning: Wolfgang Rihm. Über die Linie. Die Biografie. Benevento, Salzburg 2022, ISBN 978-3-7109-0147-8
