= Neue Musikzeitung =

German magazine for classical music

- Categories: Classical music
- Frequency: ten editions per years
- Circulation: 23,000
- Founded: 1952
- Country: Germany
- Language: German
- Website: neue musikzeitung; neueste Ausgabe (archive); nmz-Archiv (archive)
- ISSN: 0944-8136

The Neue Musikzeitung (new music newspaper, also written neue musikzeitung, and abbreviated as nmz) is a magazine focused on classical music.

== History ==
The Neue Musikzeitung was first published in 1952 by Bernhard Bosse and Eckart Rohlfs, titled Musikalische Jugend – jeunesses musicales. From 1993, it has appeared as an independent publication of the ConBrio-Verlagsgesellschaft, Regensburg. The paper was awarded the Deutscher Kritikerpreis in 1999.

It is published ten times per year. Topics are premieres of music, reports about music pedagogy, reviews of performances, festivals and new editions, comments to cultural politics and music economy, and information about people and facts of the music scene. It also provides information about jobs in music. The paper has been available online from 1997.

The Neue Musikzeitung is the official publisher of news from these music associations:

- Verband deutscher Musikschulen (association of German music schools)
- Deutscher Tonkünstlerverband (association of musicians in Germany)
- Jeunesses Musicales Germany
- Arbeitskreis Musik in der Jugend

The paper has published exclusive news about the competition Jugend musiziert, and organisations such as Landesmusikrat NRW, Deutscher Kulturrat, Bayerischer Kulturrat, the Landes-Musikakademien and the EMCY (Vereinigung der europäischen Jugend-Musikwettbewerbe).
