= Frank Beermann =

German conductor

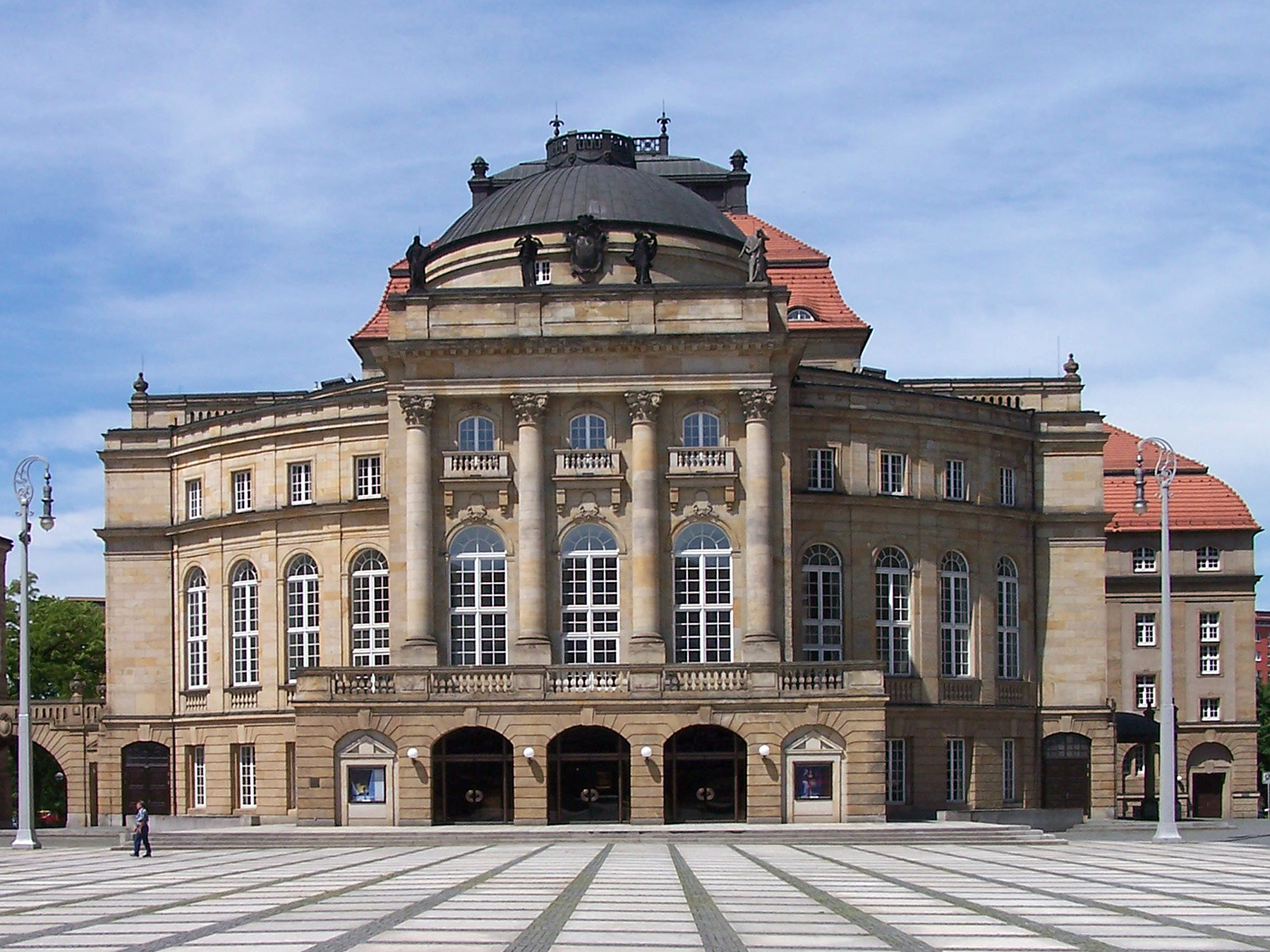
- The Chemnitz Opera House, where Beermann was GMD from 2007 to 2012
- Born: 13 March 1965 (age 60); Hagen, Germany
- Education: Hochschule für Musik Detmold
- Occupation: Conductor
- Organizations: Theater Chemnitz
- Website: frank-beermann.com

Frank Beermann (born 13 March 1965) is a German conductor. He was Generalmusikdirektor (GMD) at the Chemnitz Opera for several years, and has worked freelance at international opera houses from 2012. He has conducted premieres and recordings of rarely performed operas and orchestral works.

== Career ==
Beermann was born in Hagen. He studied at the Hochschule für Musik Detmold. He was Kapellmeister at the Staatstheater Darmstadt and the Theater Freiburg. From 1997 to 2002 he had a Residenzvertrag with the Hamburgische Staatsoper, and conducted opera at the Deutsche Oper Berlin, the Royal Swedish Opera, the Bonn Opera and the Opéra de Marseille.

=== Chemnitz Opera ===
Beermann became in 2007 Generalmusikdirektor of the Robert-Schumann-Philharmonie in Chemnitz. At the Chemnitz Opera, Beermann conducted several rarely performed works. Love and Other Demons by Peter Eötvös received its German premiere in the 2008/09 season. The following season brought Franz Schreker's Der Schmied von Gent.

In 2013/14, Ligeti's Le Grand Macabre was staged by Walter Sutcliffe with a set by Georg Baselitz. Beermann left the opera house after the 2015/2016 season to work as a freelance conductor.

=== Concerts and recordings ===
Beginning in 2002, Beermann has been the conductor in productions of stage works by Richard Wagner, a project of the Stadttheater Minden, with the Nordwestdeutsche Philharmonie. He conducted in 2002 Der fliegende Holländer, in 2005 Tannhäuser, in 2009 Lohengrin, in 2012 Tristan und Isolde, in 2015 Das Rheingold, in 2016 Die Walküre, in 2017 Siegfried, in 2018 Götterdämmerung, and in 2019 the cycle was presented twice, as Der Ring in Minden.

In 2006, Beermann conducted Mozart's piano concertos with Matthias Kirschnereit and the Bamberger Symphoniker. He conducted and recorded in Chemnitz, again with Kirschnereit, all piano concertos by Felix Mendelssohn, including the first recording of the reconstructed concerto in E minor. The recording was awarded an ECHO Klassik prize in 2009. He recorded several works by Robert Schumann with the orchestra named after him, including all symphonies including the rarely performed Zwickauer Sinfonie, and all works for violin and orchestra with soloist Ulf Wallin. He dedicated a CD to the work of Hermann Hans Wetzler, and completed recordings of symphonies by Emil von Reznicek by the third and the fourth.

He conducted premieres by Torsten Rasch, in 2011 Wouivres – Four pieces of orchestra and in 2013 Das Haus der Temperamente. In 2013 he also conducted the first performance in Germany and the first recording of Bruno Maderna's Requiem for soloists, choir and orchestra.

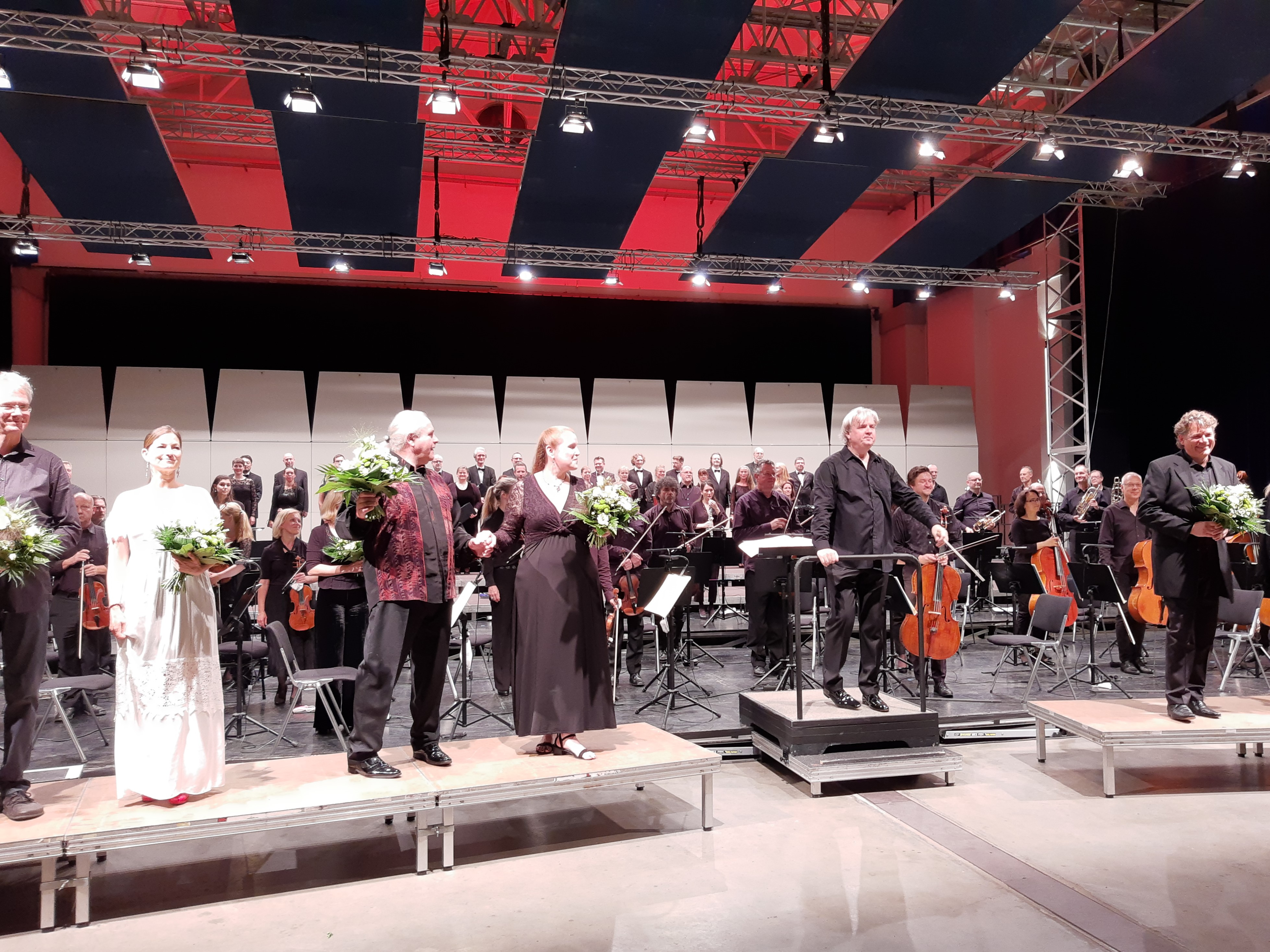
Applause after Fidelio in concert

On 10 July 2021, Beermann conducted the Nordwestdeutsche Philharmonie, choir and soloists in a concert performance of Beethoven's Fidelio at the Alfred Fischer Hall in Hamm as part of the KlassikSommer Hamm festival.

== Discography ==
Recordings by Beermann are held by the German National Library:

=== Orchestral ===
- Fesca: Sinfonie Nr. 1; NDR Radiophilharmonie, cpo, 2002.
- Fesca: Sinfonien Nr. 2 und Nr. 3; NDR Radiophilharmonie, cpo, 2001.
- Karl Goldmark: Sinfonie Nr. 1 "Ländliche Hochzeit", Robert-Schumann-Philharmonie, 2016.
- Felix Mendelssohn: Klavierkonzerte; Matthias Kirschnereit, Robert-Schumann-Philharmonie, Arte Nova, 2009.
- Mozart: Klavierkonzerte; Matthias Kirschnereit, Bamberger Symphoniker, Arte Nova, 2006.
- Emil Nikolaus von Reznicek: Sinfonie Nr. 1, Vier Bet- und Bußgesänge; Marina Prudenskaya, Brandenburgisches Staatsorchester Frankfurt (Oder), cpo 2006.
- von Reznicek: Sinfonien Nr. 2 und Nr. 5; Berner Symphonie-Orchester, cpo, 2004.
- von Reznicek: Sinfonien Nr. 3 und Nr. 4; Robert-Schumann-Philharmonie, cpo, 2014.
- Robert Schumann: Die Sinfonien; Robert-Schumann-Philharmonie, cpo, 2010.
- Schumann: Symphonische Werke; Robert-Schumann-Philharmonie, cpo, 2011.
- Schumann: Sämtliche Werke für Violine und Orchester; Ulf Wallin, Robert-Schumann-Philharmonie, BIS, 2011.
- Heinrich von Herzogenberg: Violinenkonzert A-Dur; Ulf Wallin, Deutsche Radio Philharmonie Saarbrücken Kaiserslautern, cpo, 2007.
- von Herzogenberg: Sinfonien Nr. 1 und Nr. 2; NDR Radiophilharmonie, cpo, 2004.
- Wetzler: Orchesterwerke; Robert-Schumann-Philharmonie, cpo, 2008.
- Charles Auguste de Bériot: Violin Concertos; Nordwestdeutsche Philharmonie, cpo, 2006.

=== Opera, operetta, vocal ===
- Franz Lehár: Die blaue Mazur; Johanna Stojkovich, Julia Bauer, Johan Weigel, Jan Kobow, Hans Christoph Begemann, Kammerchor der Singakademie Frankfurt, Brandenburgisches Staatsorchester Frankfurt (Oder), cpo, 2007.
- Bruno Maderna: Requiem; Diana Tomsche, Kathrin Göring, Bernhard Berchtold, Renatus Mészár, MDR Rundfunkchor Leipzig, Robert-Schumann-Philharmonie, Capriccio, 2013.
- Giacomo Meyerbeer: Vasco de Gama, Bernard Berchtold, Claudia Sorokina, Pierre-Yves Pruvot, Guibee Yang, Kouta Räsänen, Rolf Broman, Chor der Oper Chemnitz, Robert-Schumann-Philharmonie, cpo, 2014.
- Nicolai: Die Heimkehr des Verbannten; Julia Bauer, Hans Christoph Begemann, Bernhard Bechtold, Tiina Penttinen, Chor der Oper Chemnitz, Robert-Schumann-Philharmonie, cpo, 2016.
- Nicolai: Il templario; Kouta Räsänen, Stanley Jackson, Judith Kuhn, Andreas Kindschuh, Hans Christoph Begemann, André Riemer, Tiina Penttinen, Chor der Oper Chemnitz, Robert-Schumann-Philharmonie, cpo, 2009.
- Puccini: Manon Lescaut; Astrid Weber, Heiko Trinsinger, Zurab Zurabishvili, Kouta Räsänen, Edward Randall, Martin Gäbler, Tiina Penttinen, Jürgen Mutze, Matthias Winter, Arthaus Musik, 2008.
- Franz Schreker: Der Schmied von Gent; Oliver Zwarg, Undine Dreißig, André Riemer, Edward Randall, Martin Gäbler, Judith Kuhn, Viktor Sawaley, Chor der Oper Chemnitz, Robert-Schumann-Philharmonie, cpo, 2012.
- Richard Strauss: Die schweigsame Frau; Franz Hawlata, Monika Straube, Andreas Kindschuh, Bernard Berchtold, Julia Bauer, Guibee Yang, Tiina Penttinen, Matthias Winter, Kouta Räsänen, Martin Gäbler, Chor der Oper Chemnitz, Robert-Schumann-Philharmonie, cpo, 2013.
