= Nordwestdeutsche Philharmonie =

German orchestra

Coordinates: 52°06′59″N 08°41′00″E

- Symphony orchestra
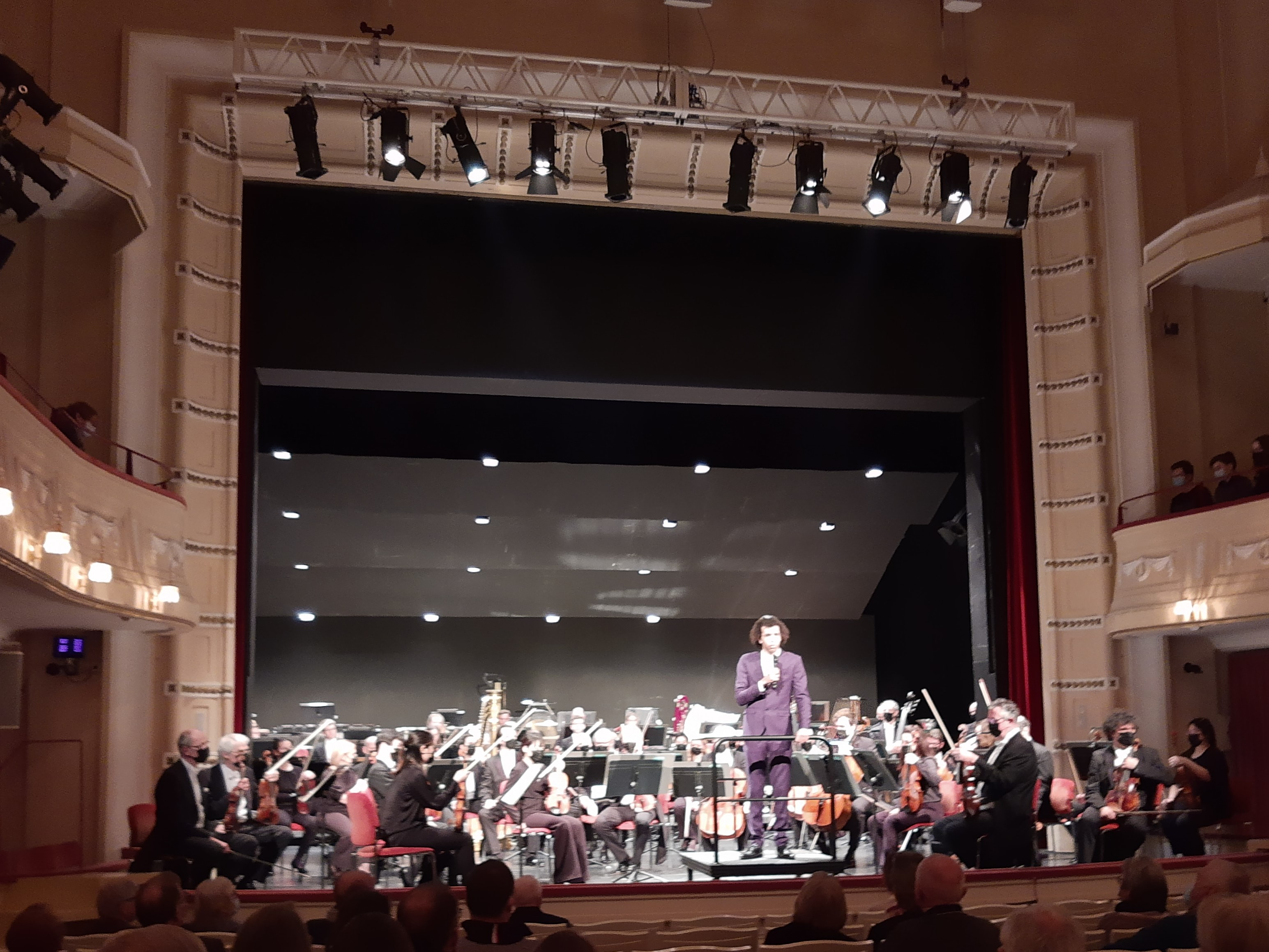
- Heyward at Stadttheater Minden on 3 March 2022, announcing that the following concert was dedicated to the victims of the invasion of Ukraine
- Founded: 1950
- Location: Herford, Germany
- Principal conductor: Jonathan Bloxham
- Website: www.nwd-philharmonie.de

The Nordwestdeutsche Philharmonie (North West German Philharmonic) is a German symphony orchestra based in Herford. Founded in 1950, the orchestra is one of the Landesorchester of the state of North Rhine-Westphalia, along with the Philharmonie Südwestfalen and the Landesjugendorchester NRW. The orchestra is funded partly by the state of North Rhine-Westphalia and an association of communities in the region Ostwestfalen-Lippe. Members of the association are the cities Bad Salzuflen, Bünde, Detmold, Herford, Lemgo, Minden and Paderborn and the districts Herford und Lippe. The orchestra gives concerts in such venues as the Konzerthalle Bad Salzuflen and the Stadttheater Minden.

== History ==
A predecessor of the Nordwestdeutsche Philharmonie was founded in 1946 under this name in Bad Pyrmont by members of the former Linzer Reichs-Bruckner-Orchester and the Prager Deutsche Philharmonie. In 1950, this orchestra merged with the Herforder Sinfonisches Orchester. The new orchestra was first named Städtebund-Symphoniker, but in 1951 Nordwestdeutsche Philharmonie.

The orchestra collaborates with the German public radio station WDR3. The players are engaged in pedagogical programs for schools and young listeners, reaching more than 12,000 children a year.

The orchestra's most recent chief conductor was Jonathon Heyward, from 2021 to 2024. In April 2024, the orchestra announced the appointment of Jonathan Bloxham as its next chief conductor, effective with the 2024–2025 season, with an initial contract of three seasons.

=== Wagner project in Minden ===
The orchestra has played in productions of stage works by Richard Wagner, an ongoing project of the Stadttheater Minden on an initiative by Jutta Hering-Winckler, president of the local Richard Wagner Society. The conductor has been Frank Beermann, GMD of the Chemnitz Opera:

- 2002 Der fliegende Holländer
- 2005 Tannhäuser
- 2009 Lohengrin
- 2012 Tristan und Isolde
- 2015–2019: Der Ring des Nibelungen. The project culminated in Der Ring in Minden, begun in 2015 with annual productions of the four parts, and two complete Ring cycles in 2019.

== Chief conductors ==
- Rolf Agop (1950–1952)
- Eugen Pabst (1952–1953)
- Wilhelm Schüchter (1953–1955)
- Albert Grünes (1955–1956)
- Kurt Brass (1956–1961)
- Hermann Scherchen (1959–1960)
- Hermann Hildebrand (1961–1963)
- Richard Kraus (1963–1969)
- Werner Andreas Albert (1969–1971)
- Erich Bergel (1971–1974)
- János Kulka (1975–1987)
- Alun Francis (1987–1991)
- Michail Jurowski (1992–1998)
- Toshiyuki Kamioka (1998–2006)
- Andris Nelsons (2006–2009)
- Eugene Tzigane (2010–2014)
- Yves Abel (2014–2020)
- Jonathon Heyward (2021–2024)
- Jonathan Bloxham (2024–present)

== Recordings ==
The orchestra has recorded more than 200 records and CDs. Various recording projects have included:

- Wilhelm Schüchter conducted in 1955 a recording of Smetana's opera The Bartered Bride performed in German, with the Nordwestdeutsche Philharmonie, the chorus of the Landestheater Hannover, Erna Berger, Rudolf Schock, Gottlob Frick, Hanns-Heinz Nissen, Christa Ludwig, Theodor Schlott and Marga Höffgen.
- In 1960, Hermann Scherchen recorded works of Max Reger with alto Margarethe Bence and the Nordwestdeutsche Philharmonie, including Eine Lustspielouvertüre (Comedy Overture), Serenade for orchestra, Eine romantische Suite, "An die Hoffnung", Variations and Fugue on a Theme of Beethoven and Variations and Fugue on a Theme of Mozart.
- Werner Andreas Albert conducted the orchestra in a recording of Robert Volkmann's orchestral works, two ouvertures, two symphonies and a cello concerto with soloist Johannes Wohlmacher.
- The orchestra, conducted by Erich Bergel, accompanied pianist Volker Banfield on a recording of Les Djinns, a symphonic poem for piano and orchestra by César Franck.
- János Kulka conducted the orchestra for a recording of works by Franz Liszt, Hungarian Rhapsody No. 6, Two Episodes of Lenau's Faust and Hunnenschlacht.
- Alun Francis conducted a recording of Carl Reinecke's four piano concertos with pianist Klaus Hellwig.
- Conducted by Michail Jurowski, they played in 1995 the premiere recording of Shostakovich's unfinished opera Die Spieler (The Gamblers) after Nikolai Gogol, completed by Krzysztof Meyer in 1981, sung in Russian by soloists of the Bolshoi Theatre.
