= Johann Baptist Spitzeder =

Austrian actor and opera singer 1764–1842)

Johann Baptist Spitzeder (24 December 1764 – 2 October 1842) was an Austrian actor and bass singer.

== Life ==
Born in Salzburg, Spitzeder was a son of Franz Anton Spitzeder (1732–1796), Mozart's first biographer. From 1786 to 1788 he was engaged by the society of Gustav Friedrich Wilhelm Großmann and its co-director Christian Wilhelm Klos, which played in Cologne, Düsseldorf, Bonn and Aachen. From there he moved to the Theater Bonn, which opened on 3 January 1789. The young Ludwig van Beethoven played viola in the orchestra of the theater. At the beginning, the ensemble also included Carl Demmer, Joseph Lux and Heinrich Vohs as well as music director Friedrich August Burgmüller.

From November 1796 Spitzeder is traceable at the society of Karl Haßloch in Kassel and made his debut on 27 September 1799 in Weimar as Osmin in Mozart's Singspiel Die Entführung aus dem Serail. In 1804 he was briefly active at the Theater an der Wien where he got into great financial trouble and apparently had no opportunity to perform. From Vienna he addressed two urgent letters of petition to Hofkammerrat Franz Kirms in Weimar, in which he offered 160 - in vain - for a return to Weimar. Instead he got an engagement at the theater in Regensburg, where he arrived with his family on 9 July 1804, probably together with Therese von Zandt. The music director of the theatre was August Burgmüller, who probably had brought Spitzeder to Regensburg. He arrived in Regensburg on 25 August 1804 and married Therese von Zandt on 13 May 1805.

In 1808 Spitzeder went to Nürnberg, and around 1820 to the Hoftheater in Munich where he died in 1842 at age 77.

== Family ==
- His daughter was the singer Adelheid Spitzeder (1793-1873), who married the painter and singer Christof Fries in 1814 and worked at the Munich Hoftheater from 1820 to 1846.
- His son was Josef Spitzeder (1796-1832).
