= Burgmüller =

Burgmüller may refer to:

- Friedrich August Burgmüller, a German pianist and conductor; his sons:
  - Friedrich Burgmüller, a German pianist and composer
  - Norbert Burgmüller, a German composer, the younger brother of the above one

== See also ==
- Burgsmüller, people with this surname
