= Christian Demmer =

German-Austrian actor and singer

Christian Joseph Demmer (baptised 6 August 1772 – 22 September 1835) was a German-Austrian tenor and actor.

== Life ==
Demmer was baptized on 6 August 1772 in the Cologne parish St. Maria im Pesch under the name Christian Joseph. He was a brother of Joseph and Carl Demmer and began his artistic career on 13 December 1780 as a choir singer at Cologne Cathedral. On 23 May 1789 he was dismissed and went to the Mainz theater in 1790.

In spring 1795 he made a guest appearance with Friedrich Wilhelm Hunnius' troop in Wetzlar and appeared there on 16 and 26 May as Tamino in Mozart's The Magic Flute. Afterwards he followed Hunnius to Mainz, who united there with the travelling troop of Simon Friedrich Koberwein (1733 - after 1803). Also with this enterprise "Herr Demmer, the youngest of the three brothers" was active as first tenor. Afterwards he worked until 1798 for Johann Ludwig Büchner's troop, which played mainly in Cologne and Mainz. The music director of both troops was Friedrich August Burgmüller. At this time he was already married with the actress Sophie Demmer née Ernst. Shortly afterwards he moved to the theater in Hamburg. In 1803 a report about the Hamburg theater reads: "Christian Demmer, singer at the local theater, left without saying goodbye to his friends, relatives and his wife." It is still unclear where he spent the following years.

On March 30, 1809 he arrived from Regensburg in Vienna, where he moved to the Theater an der Wien. From 28 April 1809 to 23 April 1824 he finally belonged to the ensemble of the Vienna Court Theatres. He celebrated his greatest successes in the role of Ober-Seneschall in the singspiel Jean de Paris by François-Adrien Boieldieu, which was performed for the first time on 28 August 1812 in the Theater am Kärntnertor. His brother Carl Demmer played the same role at the same time in a production of the Theater an der Wien. Ignaz Franz Castelli writes in his memoirs:

Two Demmer brothers were employed as singers, one at the court opera, the other at the Theater an der Wien; they played all the chevaliers, they looked so alike, and had so much the same manners and so much the same language that it was almost impossible to tell them apart. They played and sang at the same time, everyone in his theatre, the Seneschal in Jean de Paris.

According to the Viennese artist directory by Franz Heinrich Böckh, "Demmer Christ, K-k lived (Hof-Opern-Sänger" 1821) "An der Wien No 38." In autumn 1824 he went to the theatre in Graz. Last he worked in Prague. Demmer died there at age 63.

== Family ==
One daughter from Demmer's marriage with Sophie Ernst was the actress and singer Jeanette (actually Johanna) Ziegler née Demmer (1800 in Aachen - 2 July 1878 in Pest), who as Jeanette Demmer or married Jeannette Schmidt-Demmer was a member of the Vienna Court Opera from 1808 to about 1815 and then worked at the Theater in der Josefstadt. Unter anderem spielte sie in jungen Jahren im Theater an der Wien an der Seite ihres Onkels, Carl Demmer, in der namensgebenden Rolle in Pius Alexander Wolff's Preciosa.

His brothers were the singers and actors Carl Demmer and Joseph Demmer. His son Friedrich Demmer was also a singer and actor.
