= Caroline Demmer =

German-Austrian actress and singer

Caroline Friederike Wilhelmine Demmer (née Krüger; 12 February 1764 – 14 April 1813) was a German-Austrian actress and singer.

== Life ==
Born in Berlin, Krüger was the sister of actor Karl Friedrich Krüger (1765–1828) and began her theater career in 1779 at the age of 15. In 1786–87 she was engaged by Joseph Bellomo in Weimar, in 1788–89 by Gustav Friedrich Wilhelm Großmann, then by the Dietrichsche Gesellschaft, where she married the singer and actor from Cologne Carl Demmer.

On 16 November 1790 she wrote an invitation tender to Düsseldorf to Hofkammerrat Franz Kirms in Weimar and applied again for a position there. She mentioned: "But I must tell you beforehand that I... changed and married Mr. Demmer' brother who was with me in Weimar at the time. My husband is the first tenorist and plays the first also second young lovers in the comedy..., he has a very pleasant voice and is firmly musical." On the same day she applied again to Großmann, to whom she also told: "I have married myself meanwhile. My husband is the first tenorist, and also plays lovers in the comedy; my brother is also with us".

Together with her husband she came to the Weimar court theatre on 4 February 1791, where she was supported by Goethe and Schiller. In April–May 1794 both went to Frankfurt, where Demmer in particular enjoyed great popularity. Goethe's mother mentions him in several letters to her son.

In spring 1804 both finally accepted an engagement at the Theater an der Wien, and travelled from Frankfurt via Regensburg, where they arrived on 7 March to Vienna. Demmer made his debut there on 8 August 1804 at the Theater am Kärntnertor as wife of Duval in the comedy Viktorine oder Wohlthun trägt Zinsen by Friedrich Ludwig Schröder.

In 1813 the family lived on Laimgrube No 26, thus in an official residence of the Theater an der Wien, where Demmer died on 14 April 1813 at the age of 49 "from a lung addiction" (tuberculosis).

== Family ==
The marriage of Carl and Caroline Demmer gave birth to numerous important Viennese actresses and actors, among them

- Friedrich Demmer (1785 in Berlin – 15 April 1838 in Mariahilf near Vienna), from September 1829 to 1834 as singer, then until his death as chief director of the Imperial and Royal Court Opera Theatre,
- Jeannette Schmidt née Demmer (5 April 1794 in Weimar – 14 March 1862 in Vienna).
- Josefine Scutta born Demmer (19 September 1795 in Frankfurt – 22 December 1863 in Vienna), wife of Andreas Scutta, both spouses known as stage colleagues of Johann Nestroy and Wenzel Scholz,
- Thekla Demmer, married Kneisel (1802 in Frankfurt – 23 August 1832 in Vienna), also stage partner of Nestroy as well as Ferdinand Raimund's.
