= Carl Demmer =

German singer

- Born: Carl Ignaz Anton Demmer; Cologne
- Baptised: 11 February 1766
- Died: after 1824
- Occupation: Operatic tenor
- Organizations: Theater Bonn; Weimar court theatre; Vienna court opera
- Spouse: Caroline Demmer

Carl Ignaz Anton Demmer, also known as Karl, (baptised 11 February 1766 – after 1824) was an operatic tenor at the Vienna court opera, and possibly Florestan in the first version of Beethoven's opera Fidelio on 20 November 1805, then titled Leonore, oder Der Triumph der ehelichen Liebe. (Note: Other names connected to this role and performance are Friedrich Demmer (Großes Sängerlexikon) and Joseph Demmer.)

== Life ==
Born in Cologne, Demmer was baptised Carl Ignaz Anton on 11 February 1766 in the Cologne parish of St: Lupus. He began his artistic career as a choir singer at various churches in Cologne. Around 1786, he became an opera singer, who is first documented at the society of Gustav Friedrich Wilhelm Großmann and its co-director Christian Wilhelm Klos in Cologne. The music director of the company was Friedrich August Burgmüller. Together with Burgmüller, Demmer then moved to the Theater Bonn, which was opened on 3 January 1789.

At Pentecost 1790, he moved to the troupe of J. A. Dietrich, which played mainly in the Netherlands. He met Karl Friedrich Krüger and his sister Caroline, whom he soon married. The troupe also played at the just opened Hoogduitse Schouwburg Amsterdam.

On 4 February 1791 Demmer and his wife came to the Weimar court theatre, where both were supported by Johann Wolfgang von Goethe. At Pentecost 1794, the couple appeared in Frankfurt. On 5 May Goethe's mother wrote to her son in Weimar:

Herr Demmer! that's a wonderful man - he played Tamino with excellence - and our operas have won a lot through him - his wife only performed as Claudia once - you can't say much yet. Last week Die Zauberflöte was given two times at such full houses that all the doors had to remain open otherwise one would have suffocated with heat!

On 20 December 1799, Demmer gave a concert in Frankfurt to which he invited all his patrons. At the beginning of 1804, he signed a contract with the Vienna court opera, which was regretted in Frankfurt. A review noted his "strong steady voice with a high range". On 27 February 1804, Demmer gave his farewell performance in Frankfurt in the title role of Mozart's La clemenza di Tito. A few days later he travelled via Regensburg to Vienna where he arrived with his family on 7 March. Demmer made his debut there on 20 June 1804 at the court opera as Edwinsky in the Vienna premiere of François-Adrien Boieldieu's Die Verwiesenen auf Kamtschatka. The Vienna correspondent of the Allgemeine Musikalische Zeitung gave an essentially positive review of Demmer's performance:

A new tenor, Mr. Demmer, who appeared for the first time in the role of the Count, pleased. He really has a strong and pure voice, quite a range, and plays quite well. Even if his technique is not perfect, he tries to make up for it by clear diction, a quality not often found in our singers, especially tenors.

The Vienna correspondent of the Berlinische musikalische Zeitung edited by Johann Friedrich Reichardt wrote somewhat more sceptically:

For a first lover he is no longer young enough, his voice has too little sound and flexibility. But he is understandable, has a good high register, and usually sings with accuracy and expression.

The notice for the premiere of Beethoven's opera Leonore, oder Der Triumph der ehelichen Liebe (later revised as Fidelio), which took place on 20 November 1805 at the Theater an der Wien, then mentioned "Herr Demmer" in the role of Florestan. His partner was Anna Milder as Leonore, or Fidelio. The performance was a great failure for Beethoven, as even the protagonists were not given a good testimony: "Milder, despite her beautiful voice, had far too little affect and life for the role of Fidelio, and Demmer almost always intoned flat." The opera was performed only three times. Beethoven was also dissatisfied with Demmer's interpretation and replaced him with Joseph August Röckel at the premiere of the second version on 26 March 1806.

Among Demmer's great successes was the role of Ober-Seneschall in the Boildieu's singspiel Jean de Paris, which was first performed at the Theater an der Wien on 29 August 1812. The popular Cathinka Buchwieser appeared as the Princess of Navarre, and Demmer's daughter Josefine portrayed Lorezza. Curiously, his brother Christian Demmer played the same role at the same time in a production of the court theatre. Ignaz Franz Castelli writes in his memoirs:

Two Demmer brothers were employed as singers, one at the court opera, the other at the Theater an der Wien; they played all the chevaliers, they looked so alike, and had so much the same manners and so much the same language that it was almost impossible to tell them apart. They played and sang at the same time, each in his own theatre, Seneschal in Jean de Paris.

On 14 April 1813, Demmer was registered as a court actor, living at Laimgrube No. 26. On 12 April 1815, he married (at the age of 65) the 24-year-old Franziska Hofmann in Wien-Margareten. On 1 July 1822, he retired. There is no record of him after 1824.

== Family ==
The marriage of Carl and Caroline Demmer produced several children who became important Viennese actresses and actors, among them:

- Friedrich Demmer (1785 in Berlin – 15 April 1838 in Vienna), from September 1829 to 1834 as a singer, then until his death as chief director of the court opera
- Jeannette (Johanna) Schmidt, née Demmer (5 April 1794 in Weimar – 14 March 1862 in Vienna),
- Josefine Scutta, née Demmer (19 September 1795 in Frankfurt – 22 December 1863 in Vienna), wife of Andreas Scutta
- Thekla Demmer (1802 in Frankfurt – 23 August 1832 in Vienna).

Demmer was the brother of the singers and actors Joseph and Christian Demmer. His nephew was the opera singer Friedrich Demmer.
