= Friedrich August Burgmüller =

German pianist, Kapellmeister and conductor

Friedrich August Burgmüller (3 May 1760 – 21 August 1824) was a German pianist, Kapellmeister and conductor as well as the first municipal music director in Düsseldorf and co-founder of the Lower Rhenish Music Festival. He is the father of the composers Friedrich Burgmüller and Norbert Burgmüller.

== Life and work ==
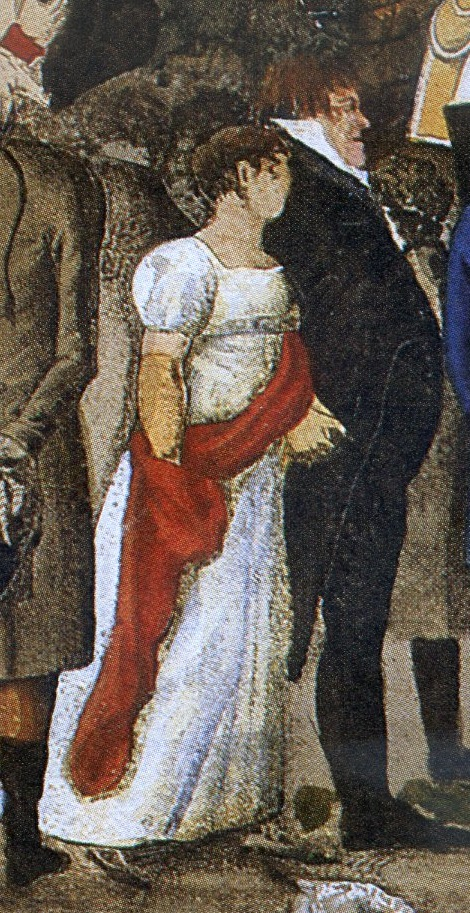
Therese and August Burgmüller as spectators at Napoleon's entry into Düsseldorf on 3 November 1811, coloured engraving by Johann Petersen (excerpt); Stadtmuseum Landeshauptstadt Düsseldorf

Burgmüller was born on 3 May 1760 in Magdeburg and baptized on 6 May with the names "Anton Friedrich". In the older literature the first names are also "Friedrich August" or "Johann August Franz", the latter in most handwritten sources. He himself signed mostly briefly "August Burgmüller". His father was Johann Christian Burgmüller (1734–1776), organist at the Magdeburger Dom, who taught him how to play the piano. From 1783 Burgmüller studied in Leipzig and Erfurt, but dropped out in 1785 and went from Erfurt to Weimar to the theatre troupe of the principal Joseph Bellomo (real name Joseph Edler von Zambiasi, 1752/54–1833). Burgmüller worked there as Kapellmeister, but also as an actor, and composed a Singspiel and stage music for the troupe.

Already in autumn 1786 he changed to Gustav Friedrich Wilhelm Großmann and his co-director Christian Wilhelm Klos at their newly founded theater company at Cologne with which he also gave guest performances in Düsseldorf and Bonn. At last Klos led the company alone and led it into bankruptcy in July 1788 in Aachen. From this outstanding ensemble emerged the so-called Bonner Nationaltheater, which was subsidized by Elector Maximilian Franz with 15,000 Reichstalers annually and opened on 3 January 1789. Together with other members of the Klosschen Troupe – including Christiane Keilholz, Carl Demmer, Joseph Lux, Johann Baptist Spitzeder and Heinrich Vohs – Burgmüller also went to Bonn and became Kapellmeister there. His theatre orchestra consisted mainly of musicians from the Bonn court orchestra, among them the 18-year-old Ludwig van Beethoven, who played viola. Beethoven obviously hoped that Burgmüller would perform his Cantata on the Death of Emperor Joseph II WoO 87, because he wrote to the Hofkammerrat August von Schall on 16 June 1790:

In the musical field, Bethof wrote a sonata on the occasion of the death of Joseph II - the text is by Severin Anton Averdonk - so completely that it can only be performed by a local whole or similar orchestra.

The whimsical letter still contains numerous news from Bonn's cultural life, but even in Bonn Burgmüller did not endure long. In the same year he moved to the Nationaltheater in Mainz. After the French occupation of the city in 1792 he went to Düsseldorf where he settled as a piano teacher. Here he met his pupil and later wife Therese von Zandt. When in October 1794 Düsseldorf was also occupied by the French, he lost sight of her again for many years.

Burgmüller fled again to Mainz and took over the musical direction of various acting troupes around Friedrich Wilhelm Hunnius and Johann Ludwig Büchner. With the two troupes he also played in Aachen, Cologne and Düsseldorf.

Due to a search advertisement published by Therese von Zandt in the Leipzig newspaper Allgemeine Musikalische Zeitung on 9 November 1803, Burgmüller left the Rhineland and travelled to Regensburg in August 1804, where he saw his former fiancée again and married on 13 May 1805. On the recommendation of the Privy Councillor Karl Christian Ernst von Bentzel-Sternau, Burgmüller was appointed Music director of the newly built Theater Regensburg. In addition he founded the first German drama school there, decisively supported by the influential Elector and Reich Chancellor Karl Theodor von Dalberg. Burgmüller's move to Regensburg can presumably be explained by the fact that Therese's father had done everything in his power to break the liaison with the musician, so that the two could only live together in "exile".

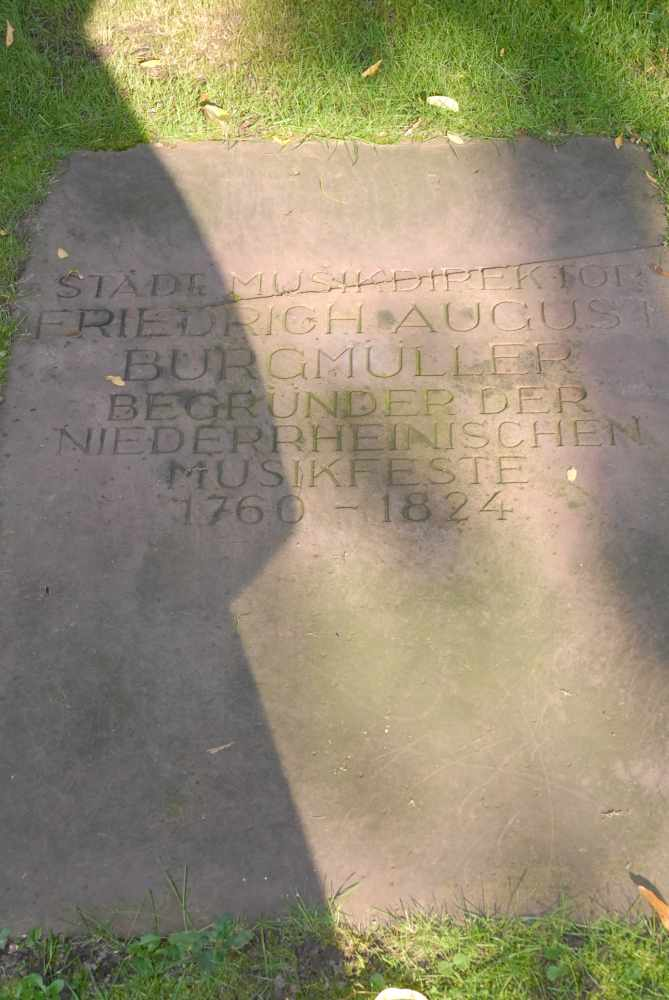
F. A. Burgmüller's tombstone

Half a year after his last festival leadership in Düsseldorf, 1822, he was dismissed for inexplicable reasons by the theatre directors Josef Derossi and Wolf, which led to severe financial losses for Burgmüller, as a result of which he fell seriously ill. He did not recover from this suffering and finally died on 21 August 1824 in Düsseldorf at the age of 64. He was buried at the Golzheimer Friedhof. After his death a benefit concert was organized in favour of his family. The people of Düsseldorf thanked him afterwards in 1949 for his merits with a new grave plate and the inscription: "Städtischer Musikdirektor Friedrich August Burgmüller, founder of the Niederrheinischen Musikfeste, 1760-1824". His two sons Friedrich Burgmüller and Norbert Burgmüller also became respected pianists and composers, with Norbert becoming the more talented and successful musician despite his short life and following in his father's footsteps. He also played an outstanding role in the Düsseldorf music scene.

== Work ==
- Drama music to Macbeth, Weimar 1785, (lost)
- Das hätt ich nicht gedacht (libretto: Christian August Vulpius), Singspiel, Weimar 1785/86, verschollen
- Ariette In questa tomba oscura (text Giuseppe Carpani), ca. 1805
- Vier Gesänge (ext: Theodor von Haupt), ca. 1818
- Frühlingslüftchen, Düsseldorf: Comtoir der National-Industrie, um 1818 (Numerised)
- Cantate zur Feier des fünfzigjährigen Amts-Jubiläums des Herren Pfarrers und Consistorialraths Hartmann in Düsseldorf am 17. Oktober 1823 / von J. F. Wilhelmi. Musik von Burgmüller. Düsseldorf: Dänzer, 1823 (Numersied libretto)
