= Michael Lorenz (musicologist) =

Austrian musicologist specialising in Mozart

- Born: 18 July 1958 (age 68); Vienna, Austria
- Education: University of Vienna
- Occupation: Musicologist
- Writing career
- Subjects: Musicology; Mozart / Schubert / Strauss scholarship

Michael Lorenz (born 18 July 1958) is an Austrian musicologist, noted as a Mozart scholar and for his archival work combining music history and genealogical research.

== Career ==
Born in Vienna, Lorenz studied cello and oboe at the University of Music and Performing Arts Vienna, where he obtained his diploma in 1990, and musicology at the University of Vienna with a PhD in 2001. From 2001 to 2005 he was chair of the International Franz Schubert Institute. Lorenz has received grants from the Jubilee Foundation of Oesterreichische Nationalbank, the Austrian Science Fund and the Music & Letters Trust. After having worked with the Esterházy Foundation, he is currently doing research based on a grant from the Jubilee Foundation of city of Vienna. In 2014 and 2016 he was employed as a lecturer at the Institute of Musicology at the University of Vienna.

Lorenz has written about Wolfgang Amadeus Mozart, Ludwig van Beethoven, Joseph Haydn and Franz Schubert. He is the author of biographical articles for

- The Revised New Grove, Stanley Sadie ed. (London: Macmillan, 2001),
- Die Musik in Geschichte und Gegenwart, ed., Ludwig Finscher (Kassel: Bärenreiter, 2000ff), and
- Das Beethoven-Lexikon, Heinz von Loesch/Claus Raab ed. (Laaber: Laaber-Verlag, 2008).

== Selected bibliography ==
- 1997 "Franz Jakob Freystädtler. Neue Forschungsergebnisse zu seiner Biographie und seinen Spuren im Werk Mozarts", Acta Mozartiana, 44, vol. 3–4 (December), 85–108.
- 1999 "Schuberts Freund Dr. Bernhard. Eine Neubewertung der Quellen", Schubert durch die Brille 23 (Tutzing: Schneider), 3–64.
- 1999 "'Viele glaubten und glauben noch, absichtlich.' – Der Tod der Ludovica Siboni", Schubert durch die Brille 23 (Tutzing: Schneider), 47–74.
- 2000 "Karl Enderes. Eine biographische Studie", Schubert durch die Brille 24 (Tutzing: Schneider), 31–80.
- 2000 "Genealogische Anmerkungen zu Joseph von Gahy", Schubert durch die Brille 24 (Tutzing: Schneider), 19–26.
- 2000 "Mozarts Haftungserklärung für Freystädtler. Eine Chronologie", Mozart-Jahrbuch 1998 (Kassel: Bärenreiter), 1–19.
- 2000 "Gottfried Ignaz von Ployers Haus in Döbling. Eine vergessene Mozartstätte", Acta Mozartiana, 47, vol. 1–2 (June), 11–24.
- 2000 "Dokumente zur Biographie Johann Mayrhofers", Schubert durch die Brille 25 (Tutzing: Schneider), 21–50.
- 2001 "Baronin Droßdik und die verschneyten Nachtigallen. Biographische Anmerkungen zu einem Schubert-Dokument", Schubert durch die Brille 26 (Tutzing: Schneider), 47–88.
- 2001 "Studien zum Schubert-Kreis", Ph. Diss., University of Vienna, 2001 (extended and revised edition to be published in 2011).
- 2002 "Mehrere Bernhards. Die Lösung des Dr. J. Bernhard-Rätsels", Schubert durch die Brille 28 (Tutzing: Schneider), 101–150.
- 2003 "Die Familie Schober und ihr genealogisches Umfeld", Schubert durch die Brille 30 (Tutzing: Schneider), 129–192 (appendix: The Schober Genealogy).
- 2006 "New and Old Documents Concerning Mozart's Students Barbara Ployer and Josepha Auernhammer", Eighteenth-Century Music, vol. 3, no. 2, September 2006 (Cambridge University Press), 311–322.
- 2005 "The Jenamy Concerto", Newsletter of the Mozart Society of America, vol. IX, no. 1 (January), 1–3.
- 2006 "Behind the Wunder: Wolfgang Amadeus Mozart and His Relevance Today", Austria Culture, Online magazine of the Austrian Cultural Forum New York, January – February 2006 (www.acfny.org).
- 2006 "»Mademoiselle Jeunehomme«. Zur Lösung eines Mozart-Rätsels", Mozart Experiment Aufklärung. Essays for the Mozart Exhibition 2006 (Ostfildern: Hatje Cantz Verlag, Da Ponte-Institut, 2006), 423–429.
- 2007 "Commentary on Wawruch's Report: Biographies of Andreas Wawruch and Johann Seibert, Schindler's Responses to Wawruch's Report, and Beethoven's Medical Condition and Alcohol Consumption", The Beethoven Journal, Winter 2007, vol. 22, no. 2 (San Jose: The Ira Brilliant Center for Beethoven Studies, 2007), 92–100.
- 2008 "New Archival Documentation on the Theater auf der Wieden and Emanuel Schikaneder", Wolfgang Amadeus Mozart: Die Zauberflöte: sources – interprétations, Henri van Hulst ed. (Brussels: Peter Lang, 2008), in press.
- 2008 "Süßmayr und die Lichterputzer: von gefundenen und erfundenen Quellen", Mozart-Jahrbuch 2006 (Kassel: Bärenreiter, 2008), 425–438.
- 2008 "Neue Forschungsergebnisse zum Theater auf der Wieden und Emanuel Schikaneder", Wiener Geschichtsblätter, 4/2008 (Vienna: Verein für Geschichte der Stadt Wien, 2008), 15–36.
- 2008 "Wolfgang Amadeus Mozart. Klavierkonzert Es-Dur, KV 271, 'Jenamy-Konzert'" (program notes for Alfred Brendel's concert at the Vienna Musikverein on 17 December 2008), Vienna Philharmonic, season 2008/2009, 120–122.
- Lorenz, Michael (27 August 2010). "Mozart's Apartment on the Alsergrund" (PDF). Newsletter of the Mozart Society of America. XIV (2): 4–9. Archived from the original (PDF) on 25 February 2016.
- 2009 "Mozarts Sterbehaus: Einige notwendige Anmerkungen", Acta Mozartiana, 56, vol. 2 (December 2009), 187–190.
- 2010 "Einige Korrekturen und Ergänzungen zu Klaus Martin Kopitz' Aufsatz 'Anmerkungen und Korrekturen zu Haydns Wiener Wohnungen'", published on the internet on 14 November 2010.
- 2011 "'Die enttarnte Elise'. Die kurze Karriere der Elisabeth Röckel als Beethovens 'Elise'", Bonner Beethoven-Studien, vol. 9 (Bonn: Beethoven-Haus), 169–190; about Elisabeth Röckel as the identity of "Für Elise".
- 2011 "Mozarts Patenkind", Acta Mozartiana, 58, vol. 1 (June), 57–70.
- "The Beethoven Family Graves in Vienna", The Beethoven Journal, Winter 2016, vol. 31, no. 2, 56-70.
- "The Financial Circumstances of Schubert’s Parents: New Documents", internet publication on academia.edu (October 2017).
- "New Archival Documentation on the Theater auf der Wieden and Emanuel Schikaneder", Die Zauberflöte: sources – contexte – représentations, Edited by Henri Vanhulst, (Bruxelles: Peter Lang, 2018), 27-48.
- "The Mozarts' Viennese Lodgings in 1762 and the House Zum Rothen Säbel", Eighteenth Century Music, 17/2, 2020, 243-259 (with Dexter Edge).
