= Thekla Kneisel =

Austrian actress and opera singer (1802–1832)

Thekla Kneisel, née Thekla Demmer (1802 in Frankfurt – 23 August 1832 in Vienna) was an Austrian actress and operatic mezzosoprano as well as a soubrette. She came from the actors family Krüger-Demmer and died at the age of 30 after a successful stage career in Vienna lasting only 15 years.

== Family ==
Theklas parents were the acting couple Caroline, née Krüger, and Carl Demmer. Numerous important Viennese actors and singers came from this marriage, among them

- Friedrich Demmer (1785 in Berlin – 15 April 1838 in Mariahilf bei Wien). From September 1829 to 1834 he worked as a singer, then until his death as chief director of the Imperial and Royal Court Opera Theatre,
- Jeannette Schmidt née Demmer (5 April 1794 in Weimar – 14 March 1862 in Vienna),
- Josefine Scutta, née Demmer (19 September 1795 in Frankfurt – 22 December 1863 in Vienna), wife of Andreas Scutta, both spouses were stage-mates of Johann Nestroy and Wenzel Scholz.

Kneisel's uncle was Karl Friedrich Krüger, actor at the Wiener Burgtheater.

== Career ==
Kneisel-Demmer was active from 1817 to 1824 as a singer at the Theater am Kärntnertor and from 1824 to 1826 as an actress at the Hofburgtheater. She was then engaged by director Carl Carl as "Localsoubrette" to the Theater an der Wien. Among other things she played in Raimund's Moisasurs Zauberfluch the role of the stone-breaker-wife Mirzel and in 1831 the chamber maid Linda in Der Barometermacher auf der Zauberinsel, as well as with Nestroy in February 1832 the widow Adelheid in Der gefühlvolle Kerckermeister and in March of this year the kitchengretl Roselheid in Nagerl und Handschuh.

That she had a very good reputation as a singer and actress was shown by a report in the Allgemeinen Musikalischen Anzeiger of 15 March 1832 (No 11, p. 43f):

Once and for all we must also praise the brave and diligent actress and singer Mad. Kneisel at the Theater an der Wien. This woman moves forward with every performance, both in play and in song, and entertains the audience with her comic acting as well as with the successful performance of Arietten and Quodlibets. […] We wish the Theater luck to this member.

However, she only had a very short period of life, because already on 20 August 1832 she fell ill suddenly violently and died on 23 August of this year. The Wiener Theaterzeitung of Adolf Bäuerle reported her death on 25 August (No 170, p. 679f.): The day before yesterday on 23 Aug., in the morning at two o'clock Mad. Kneisel, née Demmer, one of the most popular members of the Theater an der Wien, after surviving gastroenteritis died of a nervous fever. [...] Yesterday at 3 o'clock the solemn funeral took place in the Karlskirche in which mourning art lovers and many members of the local stages were not missing.

In the Sammler dated 1 September (No 105, p. 420.) her death was also greatly regretted: The friends of this theatre will painfully miss the serenity which this humorous artist, in happy emulation of the genius Krones who also passed away too quickly, understood to spread.
