= Jiránek =

Jiránek (feminine Jiránková) is a Czech surname. Notable people with the surname include:

- Antonín Jiránek (c. 1712–1761), Czech violinist and composer
- František Jiránek (1698–1778), Czech Baroque composer
- Martin Jiranek (born 1969), Canadian ice hockey player
- Martin Jiránek (born 1979), Czech footballer
- Miloš Jiránek (1875–1911), Czech painter
- Vladimír Jiránek (1938–2012), Czech illustrator

== See also ==
- 17694 Jiránek, main-belt asteroid
