= Vohs =

Vohs is a German surname, a spelling variant of Voß/Voss. Notable people with this surname include:

- Dieter Vohs (born 1935), German waterpolo player
- Friederike Vohs (1777–1860), German actress and operatic soprano
- Heinrich Vohs (1763–1804), German actor and singer
- Joan Vohs (1927–2001), American model and film and television actress
- Kathleen Vohs, American psychologist
