= Joseph Lux =

Joseph Lux may refer to:

- Joseph Lux (actor), German actor and operatic bass
- Joseph Lux (gymnast), French gymnast at the 1903 and 1907 World Artistic Gymnastics Championships

== See also ==
- Josef Lux, Czech politician
