= Helmich =

Helmich is a German surname or given name. Notable people with the surname include:

- Bernhard Helmich (born 1962), German theater manager
- Dennis Helmich (born 1991), German politician
- Heinz-Helmich van Schewick (1940–2026), German politician
- Jan Helmich (born 1998), German rower
- Johan Helmich Roman (1694–1758), Swedish composer
- Pál Helmich (born 2004), Hungarian footballer

== See also ==
- Hellmich
