= Therese von Zandt =

German pianist and singer (1771–1858)

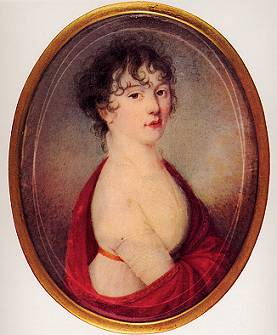
Ivory miniature of an unknown lady from Beethoven's Nachlass (about 1805), possibly Therese von Zandt; original in the Beethoven House. (Note: In older literature, it is often believed to be a portrait of Giulietta Guicciardi.)

Anna Therese Friederike von Zandt zu Reichartshausen (18 June 1771 – 26 December 1858) was a German pianist and singer. She was the mother of the composers Friedrich Burgmüller and Norbert Burgmüller.

== Life ==
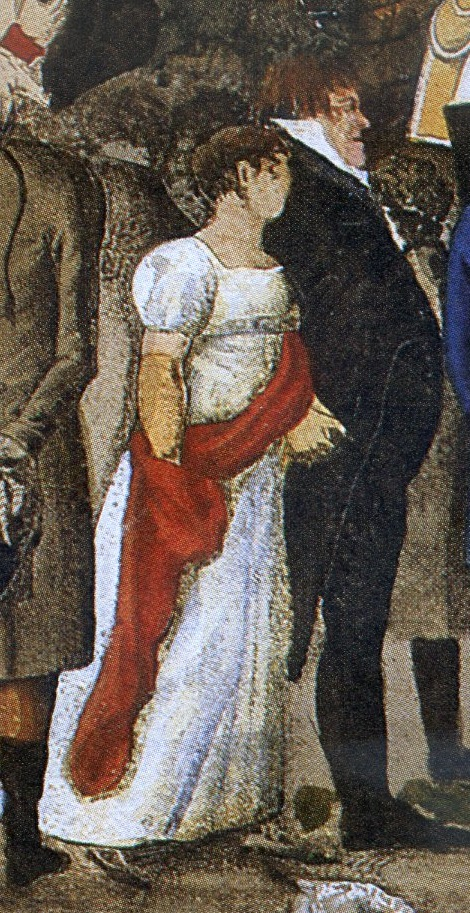
Therese and August Burgmüller as spectators at the entry of Napoleon into Düsseldorf on 3 November 1811, coloured engraving by Johann Petersen (excerpt); Stadtmuseum Landeshauptstadt Düsseldorf. - As in the portrait from Beethoven's Nachlass, Therese here has short brown hair and wears a white dress and a red sash over her left shoulder.

Born in Düsseldorf, Zandt was the youngest daughter of the married couple

- Johann Gerhard Franz Freiherr von Zandt (18 November 1740 in Mannheim – 18 March 1807 in Düsseldorf-Karlstadt), last Major General of the Cavalry, and
- Maria Sophia Reichsfreiin von Lindenfels (8 September 1745 in Schloss Wolframshof near Kastl – 28 November 1802 in Düsseldorf).

Her mother was accepted in 1795 into the Order of the Starry Cross; Therese was from 1783 to 1805 a Stiftsdame of the aristocratic liberal Stift Asbeck in Westphalia. She initially continued to live in Düsseldorf, where she was mentioned as a singer in a concert on 11 January 1792, staged by Ferretti, in which she performed two bavura arias and two further vocal performances.

From 1792 to 1794, she was a pupil and lover of her husband-to-be Friedrich August Burgmüller. When her parents discovered the relationship, they banned him. Afterwards, she probably lived in Leipzig, temporarily also in Vienna. She met Burgmüller again on 25 August 1804 in Regensburg. On 13 May 1805, they were married, and in 1807 the couple moved to Düsseldorf.

She was a sought-after piano teacher for pupils from "the first families of the city", according to Wolfgang Müller von Königswinter. From 1838 she advocated the publication of compositions left by her son Norbert and sold some to Friedrich Hofmeister Musikverlag in Leipzig. The contract was signed on 17 September 1841.

== Presumed relationship with Beethoven ==
The Beethoven scholar Klaus Martin Kopitz put forward the thesis that Zandt worked from 1798 for the Leipzig paper Allgemeine musikalische Zeitung, edited by Friedrich Rochlitz, and that she was the author of those articles signed "Z...". She possibly travelled to Vienna in the autumn of 1803 and may have recommended to Beethoven the Fidelio-story, which Rochlitz had translated from French, for an opera. She was then possibly Beethoven's lover for even months - from 5 December 1803 to 5 July 1804. Ferdinand Ries, Beethoven's pupil from 1803 to 1805, mentions in his memoirs of Beethoven:

He was very often in love, but mostly only for a short time. Since I once teased him with the conquest of a beautiful lady, he confessed that she had tied him up the strongest and longest – namely seven full months.

Beethoven could have meant Zandt, who according to Kopitz also wrote the address on the letter that Beethoven sent to Friedrich Rochlitz on 4 January 1804. In it, he informed him that he did not want to set a libretto sent by Rochlitz, but had just begun to set the Fidelio libretto to music. It's Beethoven's only known letter to Rochlitz.

A letter by Beethoven to the painter Joseph Willibrord Mähler, probably in December 1803, might also refer to Zandt:

I ask you very much to restore my portrait to me after you have used it enough – if you still need it, I ask you at least to accelerate – I have promised a lady to give her the portrait, who saw it at my place, for her room during her stay of some weeks – who can resist such charming demands.

== Honour ==
In honour of Zandt, a Theresen-Kabinett was opened at Stift Asbeck in June 2018, where her family is also honoured.

== Sources ==
- Klaus Martin Kopitz, "Sieben volle Monate". Beethoven und Therese von Zandt, in Musica, Jg. 49 (1995), pp. 325–332
- Marie-Elisabeth Tellenbach: Noch eine Geliebte Beethovens gefunden – oder erfunden? Zu Klaus Martin Kopitz: „Sieben volle Monate“. Beethoven und Therese von Zandt. In: Musica, Jg. 50 (1996), pp. 78–83.
- Klaus Martin Kopitz, Der Düsseldorfer Komponist Norbert Burgmüller. Ein Leben zwischen Beethoven – Spohr – Mendelssohn, Kleve 1998, ISBN 3-9805931-6-9
- Rainer Cadenbach: Die Léonore vor der Leonore oder: „das Licht der gescheiden und Sinnigen französischen opern. Ansatzpunkte für eine Perspektive Beethovens auf den Fait historique en deux actes et en prose, mêlé de chants von Bouilly und Gaveaux. In Von der Leonore zum Fidelio. Vorträge und Referate des Bonner Symposiums 1997. Edit. by Helga Lühning and Wolfram Steinbeck, Frankfurt, 2000, pp. 93–119.
- Bernhard Laukötter: Stift Asbeck. Legden 2005.
- Klaus Martin Kopitz: Beethoven und seine Rezensenten. Ein Blick hinter die Kulissen der Allgemeinen musikalischen Zeitung. In Beethoven und der Leipziger Musikverlag Breitkopf & Härtel – „ich gebe Ihrer Handlung den Vorzug vor allen andern“. Edit. by Nicole Kämpken and Michael Ladenburger, Bonn 2007, pp. 149–167.
- Heinz von Loesch and Claus Raab (eds.): Das Beethoven-Lexikon. Laaber 2008, ISBN 978-3-89007-476-4, p. 863f.
- "Ich glaubte nur an Musik" – Wolfgang Müller von Königswinter, Erinnerungen an Norbert Burgmüller. Edited by Klaus Martin Kopitz, Accompanying book to the exhibition for the 200th birthday of the composer at the Heinrich-Heine-Institut, Düsseldorf 2010.
- Bernhard Laukötter und Reinhold Hülsewiesche: Therese von Zandt im Stift Asbeck. Legden-Asbeck 2018.
