= Franziska Romana Koch =

German opera singer (1748–1796)

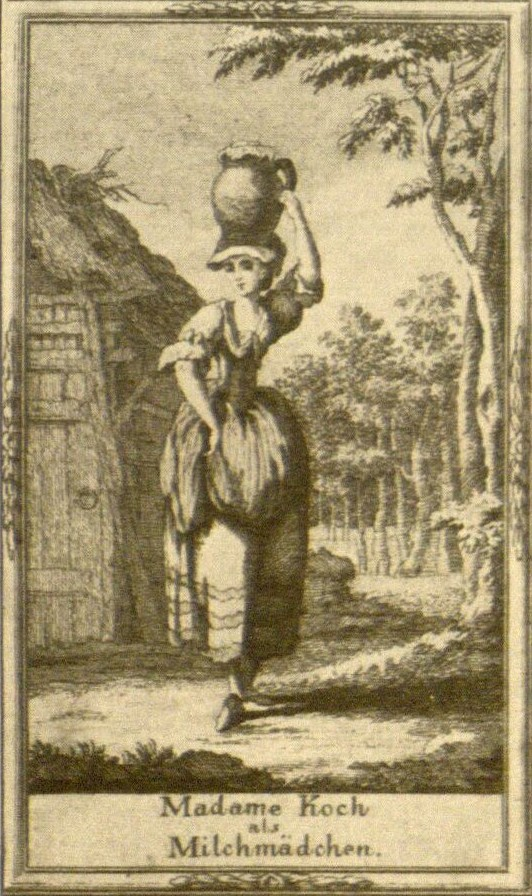
- Koch as Milk Maid in 1778
- Born: Franziska Romana Jiránek; 1748; Dresden
- Died: 1796 (aged 47–48); Dresden
- Occupations: Ballet dancer; Operatic soprano

Franziska Romana Koch, née Gieraneck, Giwraneck, Giraneck, Jiránek (1748–1796) was a German ballet dancer, soprano, and actress. First a dancer as the member of the theatre company Kochische Gesellschaft, she also trained her voice and worked at the court theatre of Weimar. Anton Schweitzer composed the opera Alceste for her, and its librettist Christoph Martin Wieland celebrated her performance in the title role in a poem. She later worked in Gotha, and finally in Leipzig as a member of Bondini's company, where she retired in 1787.

== Life ==
Born in Dresden, the daughter of composer Antonín Jiránek, Franziska made her debut as a ballet dancer in 1765 at the Kochische Gesellschaft, owned by Heinrich Gottfried Koch. In 1766 she married Friedrich Karl Koch (1740–1794), a dancer and ballet master whom she had encountered there. From 1769 onward, she changed her career from ballet dancer to opera singer.

In 1771, Koch went to Weimar with her husband as part of the Seyler Theatre Company, where she studied singing under Anton Schweitzer and later performed at Hoftheater Weimar. In Weimar, Schweitzer composed the opera Alceste (1773) for Koch, on a libretto by Christoph Martin Wieland. Her title role in Alceste became one of her great successes and inspired Wieland to celebrate her in his poem, "An Madame Koch". Duchess Anna Amalia of Saxe-Weimar-Eisenach who disliked Koch, disapproved of the opera and forbade Wieland from continuing his dramatic poetry works.

Following to the closure of the theatre in Weimar due to fire in 1774, Koch went to Gotha to the newly founded theatre, Ekhof-Theater, in 1775. She was particularly successful in the operas of the conductor and composer Georg Benda, and performed in the premieres of his Romeo und Julie (1776) and Walder (1776). In 1777, Koch left Gotha and became a member of Bondini's company in Leipzig, where she was an active singer until she retired from the stage in 1787.

=== Family ===
Koch was the mother of Friederike Koch-Krickeberg (1770–1842), who had a career as versatile actress in Schwerin, and later in Berlin. She was married to an actor Karl Ludwig Krickeberg (died in 1818).

Koch's two other daughters, Sophie (1781) and Marianne (1783) were also actresses. Her sister, Karoline Kruger (1753–1831) was an actress, married to Karl Friedrich Krüger. Their adoptive daughter, Anna Feodorowna Krüger (1792–1814) was another actress.
