= Friedrich Demmer =

Friedrich Demmer may refer to:

- Fritz Demmer (1911–1966), Austrian ice hockey player
- Friedrich Demmer (tenor) (1785–1838), Austrian operatic tenor, actor and director
