= Christiane Haßloch =

German opera singer (1764–1829)

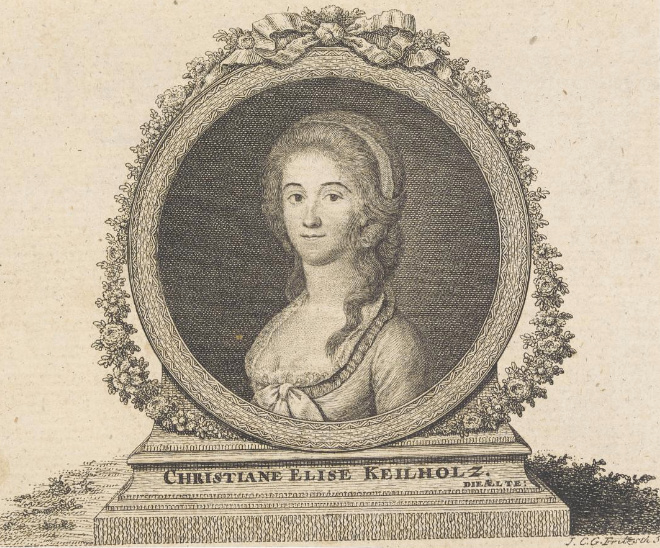
- Engraving of Christiane Keilholz (c. 1792)
- Born: Christiane Magdalena Elisabeth Keilholz; 16 July 1764; Pirna, Germany
- Died: 23 August 1829 (aged 65); Darmstadt, Germany
- Years active: 1786–1818
- Spouse: Karl Haßloch

Christiane Haßloch (née Keilholz; 16 July 1764 – 23 August 1829) was a German stage actress and coloratura soprano opera singer.

== Life ==
Christiane Magdalena Elisabeth Keilholz was born in Pirna. Her father was the actor Philipp Christian Keilholz (1735–1800). While she was growing up she made repeated stage appearances with her sister Dorothea, her brother, Adolf Philipp Christian and her parents. There were engagements in Hamburg (1776/77 and 1780–1783), in Braunschweig and Lüneburg (1777–1779) and in Münster. Between 1784 and 1786, without their parents, she and her sister Dorothea had singing engagements at the Hamburg State Opera. According to a commentator, those who heard her could not praise highly enough the "melodious and wonderful timbre of this beautiful singer".

=== Career ===
In 1786, the sisters joined the theatre company of Gustav Friedrich Wilhelm Großmann and Christian Wilhelm Klos. Under the music director August Burgmüller the company gave its performances in the larger Rhineland cities, notably Cologne, Düsseldorf, Bonn and Aachen. The company broke up in 1787. During the 1789/90 season she played at the Bonn Court Theatre which had re-opened in January 1789, and where the young Ludwig van Beethoven played the viola in the theatre orchestra.

By May 1790, she had left Bonn and joined the Mannheim National Theatre where she made her debut as Constanze, the lead role in Mozart's opera, Die Entführung aus dem Serail. She remained at Mannheim until April 1792, when she moved to Amsterdam to undertake some engagements at the German Theatre. Leaving Mannheim at short notice involved breaking her agreement, and she was obliged to pay a contractual penalty of 100 ducats when she returned to Mannheim in August 1792. In 1793, she went back to Amsterdam, this time accompanied by the tenor Karl Haßloch whom she married.

Between 1795 and 1804, she worked with her husband in Kassel. They went on a tour of Germany, after which, in 1809, she withdrew completely from theatre work for a year. She then moved to the newly created Darmstadt Theatre, where she worked as a singer and actress and was appointed Court Actress (Hofschauspielerin). She withdrew to private life, this time permanently, in 1818. She died there in 1829, aged 65.
