= Quatuor brillant in A major (Joseph Kreutzer) =

The Quatuor brillant in A major, is a composition for violin and string trio by Joseph Kreutzer, dedicated to the composer's father. The work was first published by Simrock perhaps around 1815.

== Structure ==
The composition is in three movements:

1. Allegro
2. Adagio
3. Rondo
