= Lin Mei-hong =

Taiwanese choreographer (born 1959)

- 林美虹
- Born: 1959 (age 66–67); Luodong, Yilan County, Taiwan
- Education: National Dance Academy
- Occupations: Dancer, choreographer
- Spouse: Bernhard Helmich
Lin Mei-hong
- Chinese: 林美虹
Transcriptions
Standard Mandarin
- Hanyu Pinyin: Lín Měihóng
- IPA: [lǐn mèɪ.xʊ̌ŋ]
Southern Min
- Hokkien POJ: Lîm Bí-khēng

Lin Mei-hong (born 1959) is a Taiwanese choreographer. Lin began dancing with the Lanyang Dance Troupe in Taiwan, then moved to Italy and Germany for further training. She has spent the majority of her career in Europe, with the Ballet in Plauen, Theater Dortmund, and Staatstheater Darmstadt. Between 2013 and 2022, Lin was artistic director for the ballet of the Austrian Landestheater Linz.

Lin has produced adaptations of The House of Bernarda Alba, Macbeth, and Carmina Burana, among others. She has also choreographed Die Brautschminkerin, which was nominated for a Der Faust award in 2011.

== Life and career ==
Lin was born in Luodong, Yilan County, Taiwan, in 1959. As children, the four Lin sisters took ballet and piano classes. Lin Mei-hong then participated in the first classes held by Gian Carlo Michelini's Lanyang Dance Troupe, founded in 1966, and joined the troupe itself around the age of 10. Aged 16, she pursued further study at the National Dance Academy, where she was trained in ballet. Near the end of her time in Italy, Lin attended a performance by the Tanztheater Wuppertal, led by Pina Bausch. Lin subsequently enrolled at the Folkwang Hochschule, where she graduated in 1989. That year, Lin returned to the Lanyang Dance Troupe as choreographer. Lin began as director in 1991 of the Ballet in Plauen. Between 1997 and 2002, Lin served as artistic director of the ballet at Theater Dortmund. She joined Staatstheater Darmstadt as artistic director in 2004. While affiliated with Staatstheater Darmstadt, Lin was also director of Lanyang Dance Troupe. In 2006, Lin received the German Artist of the Year Award. In 2013, Lin began work as artistic director of TANZLIN.Z, of the Landestheater Linz in Austria. While at the Landestheater Linz, she has worked with Taiwan-based artists, such as the Romanian choreographer Constantin Georgescu. Lin was placed on paid leave from the Landestheater Linz in September 2021 and eventually terminated in February 2022. She was replaced by Roma Janus.

== Works ==
Lin choreographed Kavalan Princess by Taiwanese playwright Yu Yuan-keng in 1999. In 2003, Lin produced an adaptation of The Beautiful Game. In her tenure with Staatstheater Darmstadt, Lin has produced adaptations of several widely known works, such as Jesus Christ Superstar (2005), The House of Bernarda Alba (2005), Macbeth (2005), The Juliet Letters (2006), Ainadamar (2007), Carmina Burana (2008), and Hôtel du Nord (2008). Lin's original works, such as Violett, Lila, PurPur, have also been performed by Staatstheater Darmstadt. The 2010 performance of a second original work Schwanengesang (Swan Song) during the Taiwan International Festival, was the first time Lin had staged a dance in Taiwan since starting her career in Europe. In 2011, Lin premiered Die Brautschminkerin (Bridal Makeup), based on Li Ang's Rouged Sacrifice, in turn inspired by Taiwan's February 28 incident. Die Brautschminkerin was nominated for the German Theatre Association's Der Faust award. Her second performance in Taiwan took place in 2018. The Little Mermaid linked the Hans Christian Andersen story of the same name with Oscar Wilde's The Birthday of the Infanta. Lin returned to Taiwan in 2019 to perform Die Brautschminkerin. Writing for the Taipei Times in 2019, Diane Baker observed that full-length contemporary ballet performances were rarely staged in Taiwan, naming Taiwan natives Allen Yu and Lin, as well as Ballet Preljocaj, Hong Kong Ballet, and Ballet am Rhein in the full list of performers.

== Personal life ==
Lin is married to theatre manager Bernhard Helmich.
