= Gian Carlo Michelini =

Italian-Taiwanese priest (1935–2026)

- Born: 7 July 1935; Bologna, Italy
- Died: 4 April 2026 (aged 90); Luodong, Yilan, Taiwan
- Other names: Mi Ke-ling (秘克琳)
- Citizenship: Italy; Taiwan (since 2017)
- Occupation: Roman Catholic priest
- Years active: 1964–2026

Gian Carlo Michelini, M.I. (Chinese: 秘克琳; pinyin: Mì Kèlín; 7 July 1935 – 4 April 2026) was an Italian-Taiwanese Roman Catholic priest. He moved to Taiwan in 1964, where he founded the Lanyang Dance Troupe. In 1996, Michelini helped establish the Yilan International Children's Folklore and Folkgame Festival.

== Early life and arrival in Taiwan ==
A native of Bologna, Italy, Michelini was born on 7 July 1935. He first learned about the Chinese language and culture through his uncle, who had served as a missionary in China. Inspired by his uncle's experiences, Michelini became a priest. He settled in Taiwan in 1964, aged 29, and adopted the Chinese name Mi Ke-ling (秘克琳; Mì Kèlín). Sponsored by the Camillian Order, Michelini spent the first two years of his life in Taiwan studying Mandarin in Hsinchu. While in Hsinchu, Michelini watched Chinese films to learn the language, and also viewed performances of Chinese opera and glove puppetry.

== Lanyang Dance Troupe ==
Soon after he moved to Luodong, Yilan, Michelini founded the Lanyang Dance Troupe in 1966, which expanded into the Lanyang Youth Catholic Center. Both organizations were named for the Lanyang Plain. Choreographer Lin Mei-hong was a member of the Lanyang Dance Troupe's inaugural class and formally joined the troupe around the age of ten. The Lanyang Dance Troupe made its international debut in 1974, with a three-month long tour throughout Michelini's home country of Italy. Only 32 people saw the troupe's first Italian performance, because the show had not been adequately advertised. Despite the tour's inauspicious start, the troupe's reputation grew, and a performance for Pope Paul VI was booked. The Lanyang Dance Troupe then became the first performing arts company to perform for a pope in the Vatican. The troupe returned to Europe for another tour in 1975, followed by a South American tour from 1977 to 1978. As the troupe prepared for their return to Taiwan from South America, they were invited to stage the first Chinese cultural performance at the Disneyland Resort. The troupe subsequently toured in Central America. In the early 1980s, the Lanyang Dance Troupe worked with Henry Yu, a student of Tsai Jui-yueh's, on the Graham technique. In 1986, the Lanyang Dance Troupe began working with choreographers from Hong Kong. Lin Mei-hong returned to the troupe as choreographer in 1990, and has also served as director. Though the troupe began with an emphasis on Chinese court dances and folk dances, it later incorporated modern dance styles. In 1990, Michelini attended a conference convened by the International Council of Organizations of Folklore Festivals and Folk Arts. Taiwan joined the international non-governmental organization in 1994, with Michelini's dance troupe serving as point of contact.

== Later work ==
Michelini helped establish the Yilan International Children's Folklore and Folkgame Festival in 1996, and served as general secretary of the Folklore Festival Association of the ROC. In 2011, the name of Michelini and other foreign aid workers were commemorated by Liu Po-chun on a metal tree sculpture. The art piece was donated to the Council for Cultural Affairs by the Foundation of Taiwan Organizations of Philanthropic Education. The next year, Michelini was a recipient of the National Cultural Heritage Conservation Award. In 2013, Michelini donated photographs of the Lanyang Dance Troupe to the Yilan County Government. In 2015, the Order of Brilliant Star with Violet Grand Cordon was conferred upon Michelini. On 6 July 2017, Michelini was naturalized as a citizen of the Republic of China, and became the first person to hold naturalized dual citizenship under the revised Nationality Law provision for special contributions to art and culture. At his naturalization ceremony, Michelini stated, "This is the best birthday gift. I want to do many more things for Taiwan!" The Yilan County Government acknowledged Michelini's contributions to local arts and culture in 2025.

== Death ==
Michelini died at Saint Mary's Hospital in Luodong, on 4 April 2026, at the age of 90. Michelini's funeral Mass was held on 9 April 2026, at Our Lady of the Assumption Catholic Church in Luodong, and he was buried at Guangxing Catholic Cemetery.
