= Karl Friedrich Krüger =

German actor

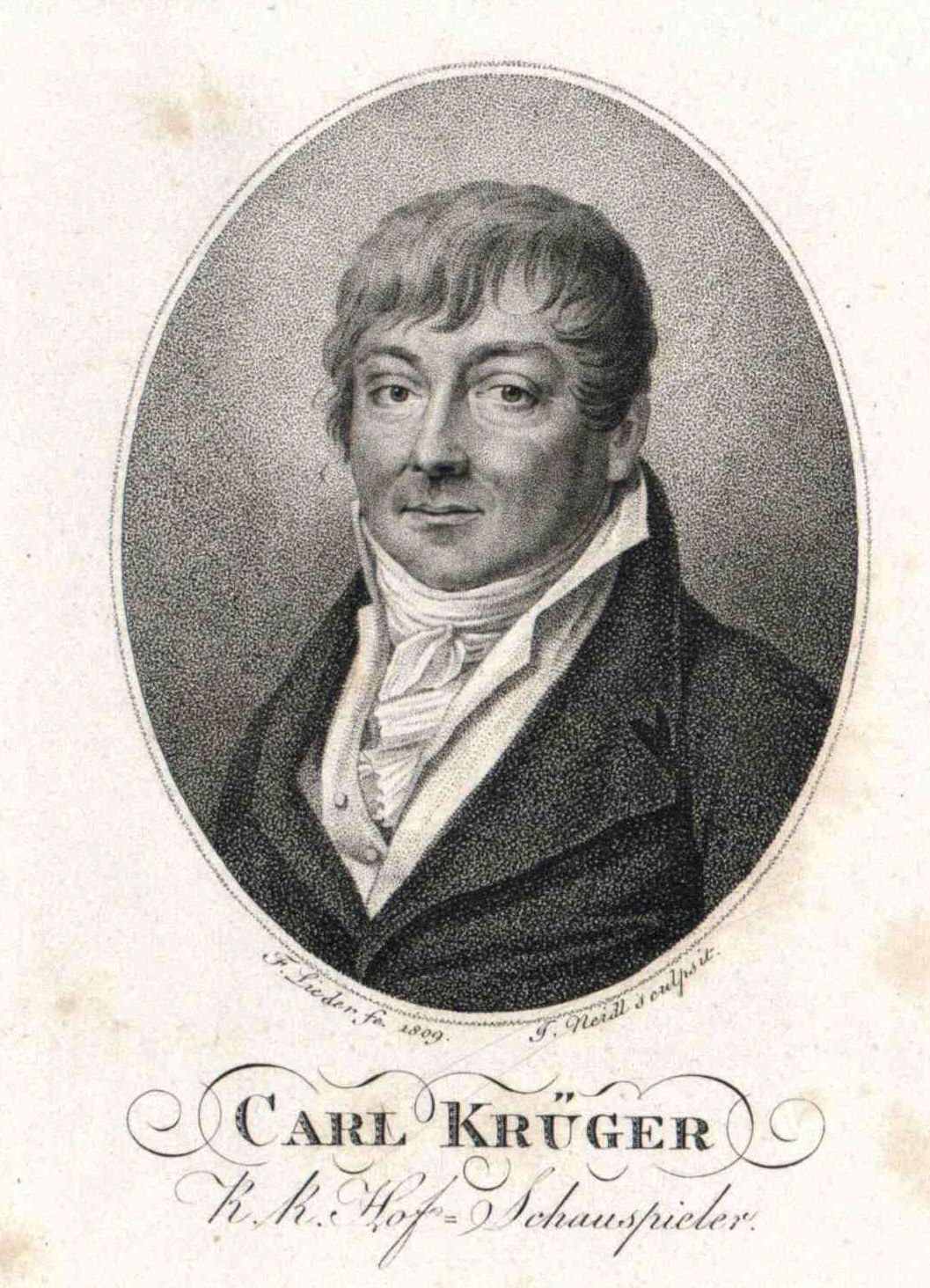
Karl Friedrich Krüger, 1809

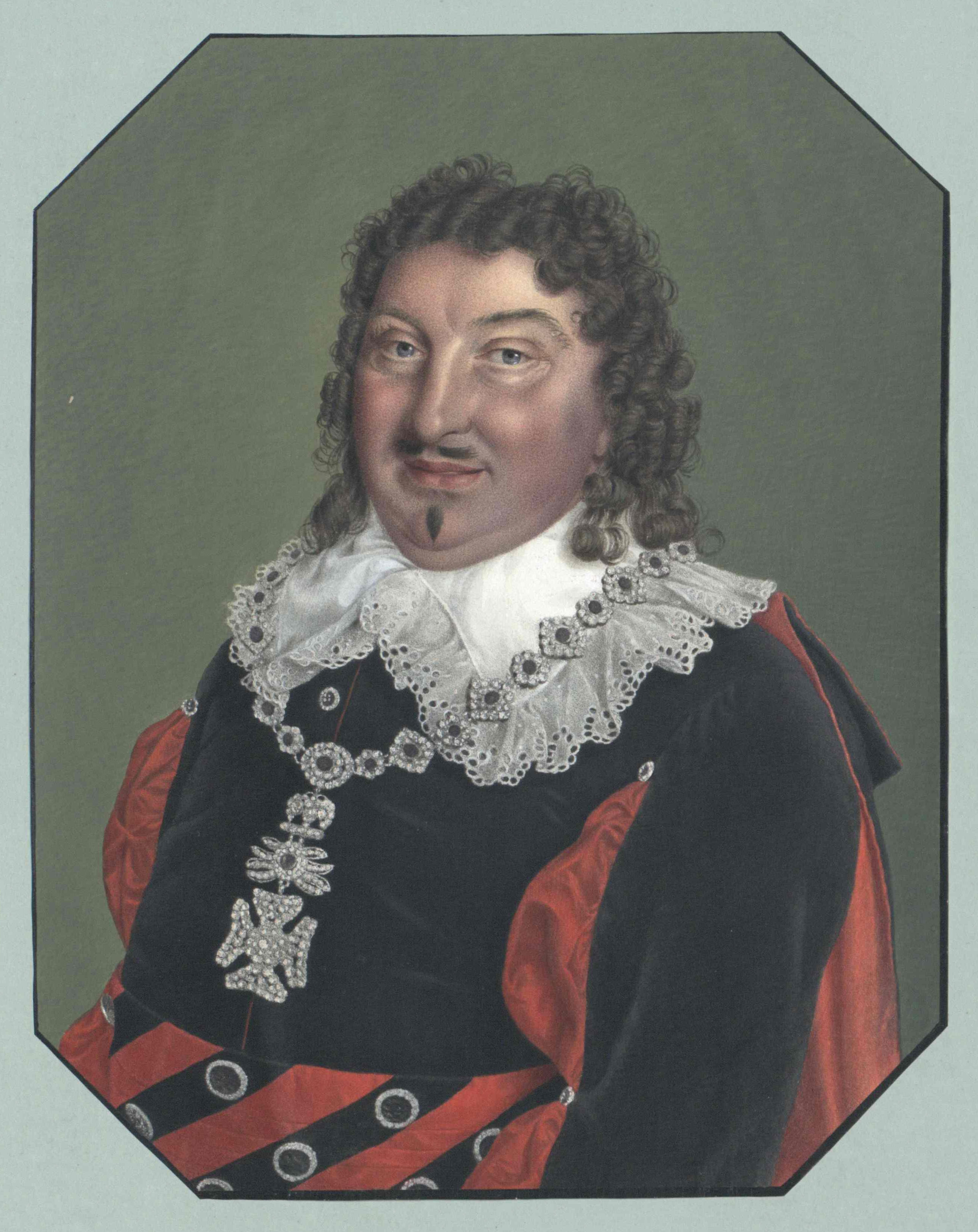
Krüger as Graf Almaviva in Die beiden Figaro by Johann Friedrich Jünger after Martelly.

Karl Friedrich Krüger (18 December 1765 – 21 April 1828) was a German actor and the brother of actress Caroline Demmer.

== Life ==
Krüger was born in Berlin. His father was a musician in the royal chapel in Berlin. He himself made his debut on 14 February 1785 at the Hoftheater in Berlin as Kosinsky in Schiller's drama The Robbers. In 1786–87 he was engaged—with his sister—in Weimar, later in Magdeburg and Hannover, and went to Amsterdam in 1789. In 1791 he returned to Weimar and worked there until 1793. At the Weimar premiere of Don Carlos, on 22 February 1792, he played Domingo. Further stations were again Amsterdam, Prague, Karlsbad, Chemnitz, Leipzig (1797–1799), Freiberg, Teplice and from 1800 Brünn.

In 1802 he went to the Wiener Burgtheater, to which he belonged until his death. He was regarded as an extremely versatile actor who later also appeared as a comedian. Ignaz Franz Castelli wrote about him:

Krüger was an ornament of the Viennese court theatre both in the touching and in the comical. I have never seen old dudes like the Hofmarschall Kalb and the old Wallenstein in the 'Player' portrayed with this truth again.

He was married to the actress Karoline Krüger. His sister-in-law was Franziska Romana Koch and his father-in-law was Antonín Jiránek. Anna Feodorowna Krüger, also an actress, was his adopted daughter.

Krüger died in Vienna at the age of 62.
