= Theater Chemnitz =

Municipal theater organization in Chemnitz, Germany

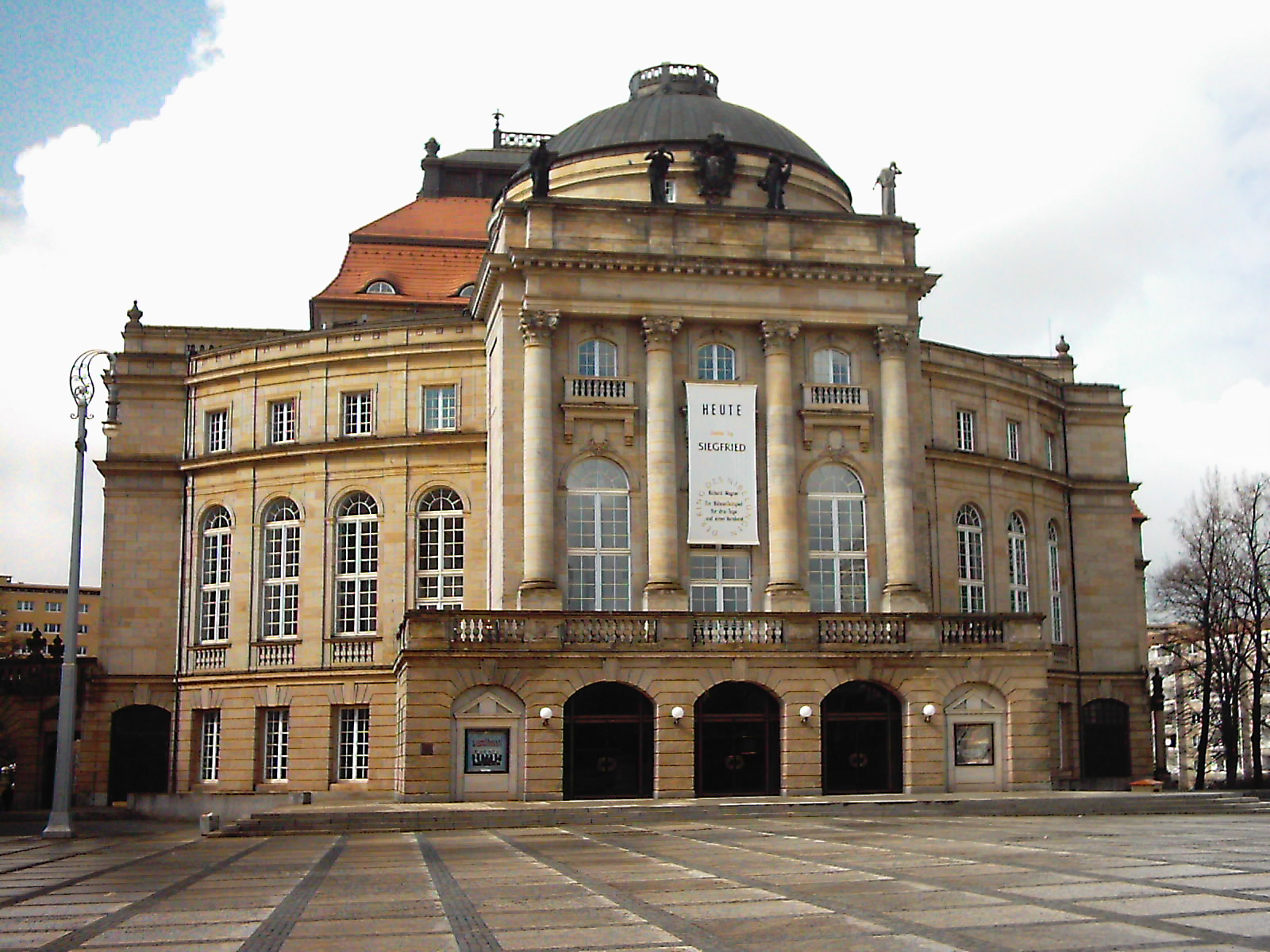
- Opernhaus Chemnitz

General information
- Location: Chemnitz, Saxony, Germany
- Construction started: 1906
- Opened: 1909
- Renovated: 1947–1952; 1988–1992

Design and construction
- Architect: Richard Möbius

Website
- www.theater-chemnitz.de

Theater Chemnitz is a German municipal theater organization based in Chemnitz. Performances of opera, ballet, plays, symphonic concerts, and puppet theater take place in its three main venues:

- Opernhaus Chemnitz (for opera, ballet and musical theater)
- Stadthalle Chemnitz (for concerts)
- Schauspielhaus Chemnitz (for plays and puppet theater)

The opera company has produced a series of rarely performed works, and several German premieres. The resident orchestra of the company is named the Robert-Schumann-Philharmonie.

== Opernhaus ==
Located at Theaterplatz 2 (50°50′18″N 12°55′27″E), the Theater Chemnitz was designed by the German architect Richard Möbius and built between 1906 and 1909. Following its destruction during World War II, it was reconstructed between 1947 and 1951. It was renovated again from 1988 to 1992, and is considered to be one of the most modern opera houses in Europe. It seats 720 people.

Intendant Bernhard Helmich focused on the presentation of rarely played historic operas, such as Mascagni's Iris, Nicolai's Il templario and Die Heimkehr des Verbannten, Pfitzner's Die Rose vom Liebesgarten, Reznicek's Benzin, and Schreker's Der Schmied von Gent. Vasco de Gama, an early version of Meyerbeer's L'Africaine, was named Wiederentdeckung des Jahres (Rediscovery of the year) in 2013 by the journal Opernwelt. German premieres have included Jonathan Dove's Pinocchios Abenteuer, and both Love and Other Demons and Paradise Reloaded (Lilith) by Péter Eötvös. Two productions received the German theater award Der Faust in 2007: Prokofiev's Die Liebe zu den drei Orangen, staged by Dietrich Hilsdorf, and the ballet Giselle M. in a choreography by Stephan Toss.

== Stadthalle ==
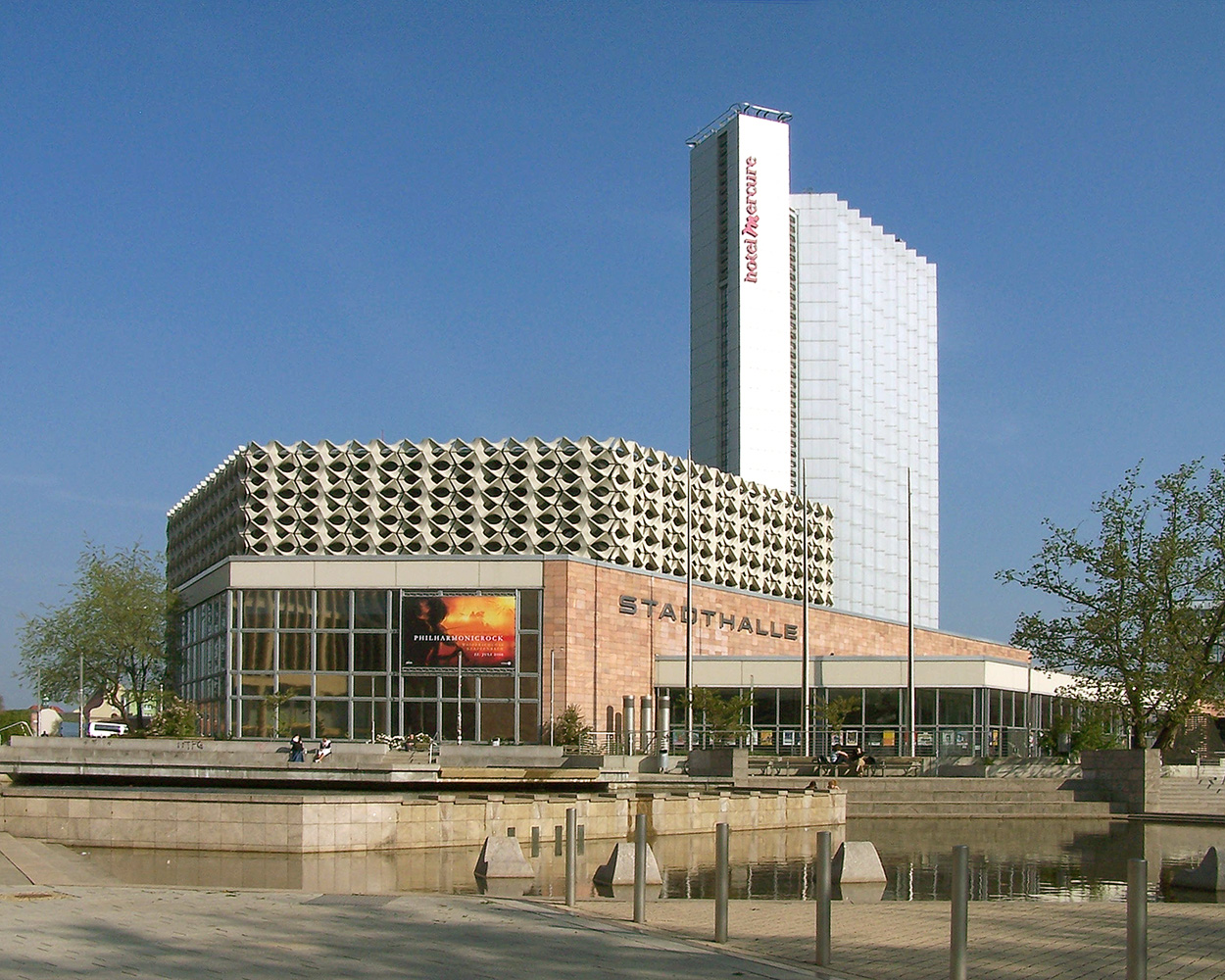
Stadthalle Chemnitz

Located at Theaterstraße 3 (50°50′07″N 12°55′16″E), the Stadthalle Chemnitz was built between 1969 and 1974 as a multi-purpose concert hall in the centre of the city. It was opened in 1974 and is the official home of the Robert-Schumann-Philharmonie. The orchestra performs a series of ten symphonic concerts there annually, as well as special concerts and chamber music performances. The orchestra also participates in opera, ballet, and musical theater productions in the opera house.

== Schauspielhaus ==
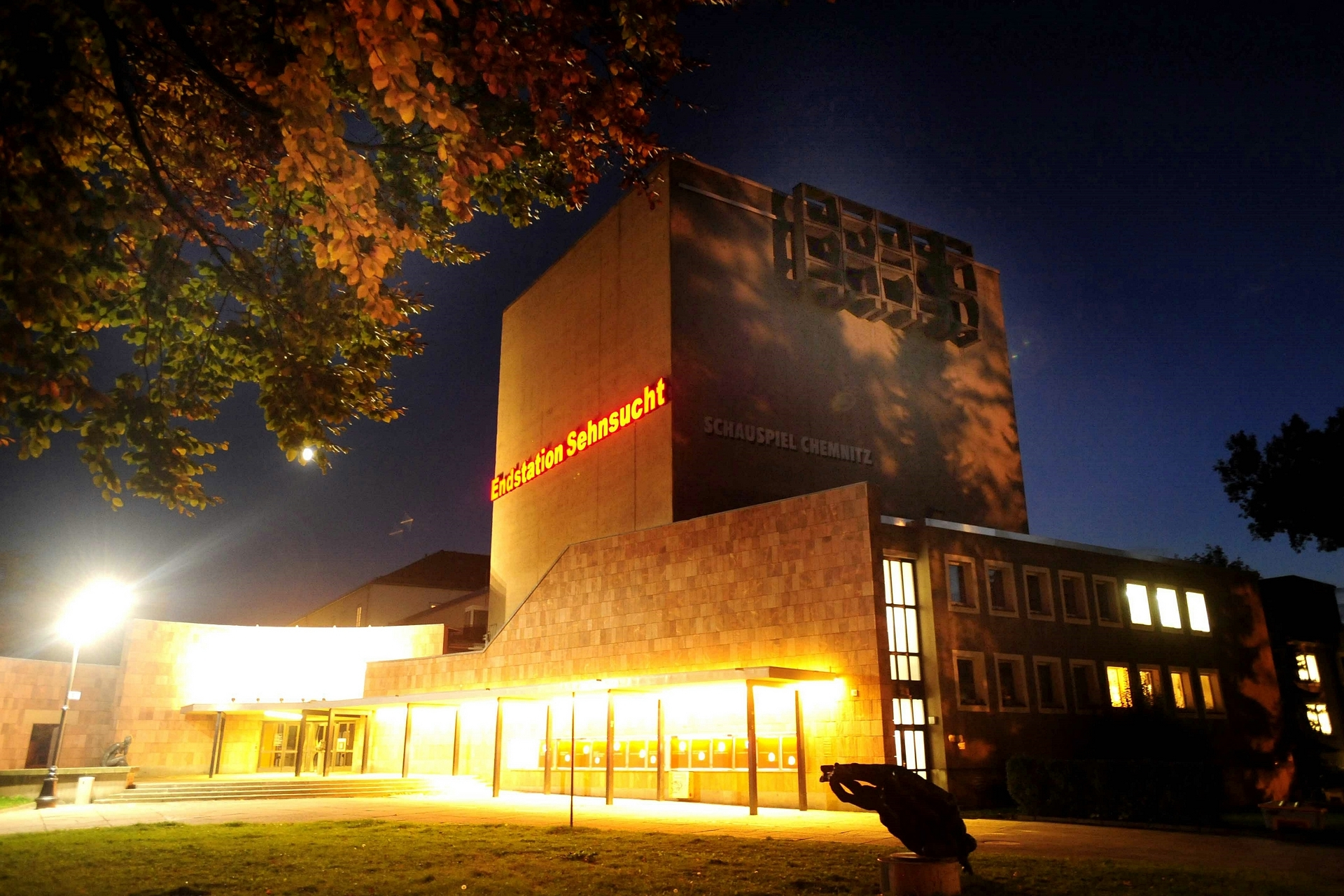
Schauspielhaus Chemnitz

Located at Zieschestraße 28 (50°49′44″N 12°55′53″E), the playhouse is a new building, opened in 1980, after the former house burnt down in 1976 and was demolished. The repertory is focused on literary drama. Its smaller stage in the east wing, opened in 2011, is dedicated to the performance of premieres and contemporary theater.

A smaller stage within the playhouse, formerly Kleine Bühne, is the main venue for the Figurentheater. Performances are staged with traditional marionettes, hand puppets, and rod puppets, as well as with free-forms of artistic puppet theater.

== Generalmusikdirektoren (General Music Directors; partial list) ==
- Oscar Malata (1910–1931)
- Rudolf Kempe (1945–1948)
- Robert Satanowski (1960–1962)
- Gert Bahner (1962–1965)
- Dieter-Gerhardt Worm (1974–1993)
- John Carewe (1993–1996)
- Oleg Caetani (1996–2001)
- Nikša Bareza (2001–2007)
- Frank Beermann (2007–2016)
- Guillermo García Calvo (2017–2023)
- Benjamin Reiners (designate, effective 2025)
