= Joseph Kreutzer =

German musician (1790–1840)

Joseph Kreutzer (11 November 1790 – 16 June 1840) was a German composer, conductor, guitarist, and violinist. Kreutzer was born in Aachen, the son of a local music teacher. He lived in Düsseldorf from about 1805, where he established himself among the leading musicians of the city. He is known to have been a violin teacher to Norbert Burgmüller and probably concert master at the local theatre for a time. He died in Düsseldorf.

His compositions consisted mostly of chamber music and instructive pieces for bowed strings and guitar. It is for his charming though conservative guitar works that he is still being performed and recorded today. He also penned a lost symphony.

== Works ==
=== Guitar ===
- 6 Variations on a Theme from Weber's "Der Freischütz" op. 6 (for 2 guitars)
- 6 Variations on a theme by Mozart op. 7
- Six Variations brillants über das Lied "A Schüsserl und a Reindl" op. 10
- Six Variations in C major op. 11
- Six Variations on "God Save the King" op. 12
- Variationen über das Lied "Kind willst du ruhig schlafen" aus Peter von Winters Oper "Das Opferfest" op. 13
- 8 Variations in A major on a favourite Tyrolean song op. 14
- 12 Pièces amusantes op. 17
- Trois Rondeaux op. 23
- 6 Variations op. 24

=== Chamber ===
- Flute Quartet No 1 in D Major
- Flute Quintet No. 2 in C major
- Flute Quartet No 3 in G Major
- Quatuor brillant
- 3 Rondos for Guitar op. 23
- Trio No. 1 in A Major for Flute, Violin and Guitar Opus 9
- Trio No. 2 in E Minor for Flute, Violin and Guitar Opus 9
- Trio No. 3 in D Major for Flute, Violin and Guitar Opus 9
- Trio No. 4 in C Major for Flute, Violin and Guitar Opus 9
- Trio for Flute, Clarinet and Guitar in three movements: I: Allegro risoluto; II: Adagio; III: Alla Polacca, Opus 16
