= Hellmich =

Hellmich is a German surname. Notable people with the surname include:

- Heinz Hellmich (1890–1944), German general in the Wehrmacht during World War II
- Ottó Hellmich (1874–1937), Hungarian gymnast
- Wolfgang Hellmich (born 1958), German politician

== See also ==
- Helmich
