= Joseph Lux (actor) =

German actor and opera singer

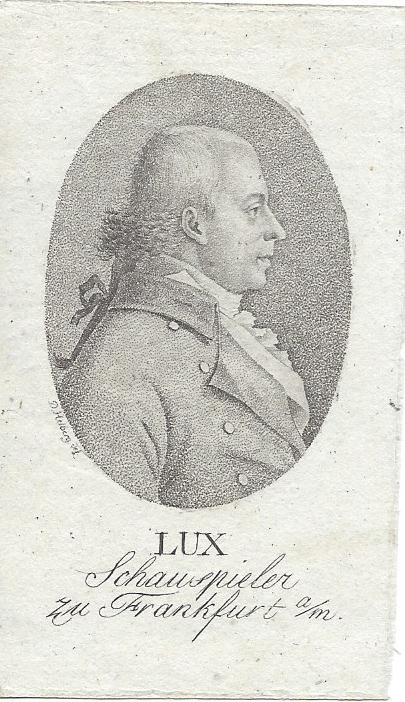
Joseph Lux, puncture stitch by D. Helberg

Joseph Lux (January 1757 – 9 May 1818) was a German actor and operatic bass, who appeared especially in comic roles.

== Life ==
Born in Glatz, Lux was first engaged from 1783/84 in Johann Heinrich Böhm's travelling troupe. In 1786 he changed to Gustav Friedrich Wilhelm Großmann, who at this time had joined the theatre entrepreneur Christian Wilhelm Klos and played in the cities of Cologne, Düsseldorf and Bonn. The music director of the company was Friedrich August Burgmüller. The important ensemble, which last performed in Aachen, gave rise to the Bonner Nationaltheater, which was subsidized by Elector Maximilian Franz with 15,000 Reichstalers per year and opened on 3 January 1789. Lux soon assumed a central position there. On 2 October 1789 he was also employed as a court musician. Temporarily, until February 1790, the Bonner Theater also included Heinrich Vohs.

Through his activities Lux came into close contact with the young Ludwig van Beethoven and accompanied him and the other members of the court chapel on the memorable journey the court made to Mergentheim in September and October 1791. Beethovens Jugendfreund Franz Gerhard Wegeler berichtet:

This journey, which the whole orchestra made in two yachts up the Rhine and Main in the most beautiful season of the year, became a fruitful source of the most beautiful pictures in Beethoven's memory. Beethoven and Bernhard Romberg were appointed kitchen boys in the roles which Lux, the singer chosen as the great king and well-known comedian, performed. The diploma of his further promotion, which Beethoven received, dates: at the height of Rüdisheim, one will probably still have found it in his estate; at least I still saw it in his best custody in 1796. A large seal printed in pitch in the lid of a box, fastened by some severed threads of a ship's rope, gave this diploma an honorable reputation.

Beethoven probably composed for Lux the two comic arias for bass and orchestra Prüfung des Küssens WoO 89 and Mit Mädeln sich vertragen WoO 90, written in 1790.

On 7 July 1792 Lux made his debut in Frankfurt am Main, where he was heard by Goethe. He characterized him as a "crowded, well-educated middle figure" and an actor who "knows how to motivate his clothes and gestures after the roles". Soon Lux belonged also in Frankfurt to the most popular actors, as an article from Frankfurt reports:

Hr. Lux probably deserved to be noticed at first when I wrote about the local theatre in general. But since his main merit lies in his excellent, true, othernomical play, I can only touch him fleetingly here. It is certain, however, that I have never seen so many original whims in the margins of nature and decency as with him. His Kapellmeister in Korsar, Rinnfeld in gebesserten Eigeninngen, and Filz in Knicker, are masterpieces of comic representation.

Lux remained attached to the Frankfurter stage until his death. He died in Frankfurt at the age of 61.
