= Severin Anton Averdonk =

German writer

- Born: Anton Clemens Averdonk; 16 February 1768; Bonn, Electorate of Cologne
- Died: 6 September 1817 (aged 49); Bonn-Graurheindorf
- Occupations: Priest, poet, librettist
- Known for: Librettist for Beethoven’s early cantatas
- Notable work: Cantata on the Death of Emperor Joseph II (WoO 87); Cantata on the Accession of Emperor Leopold II (WoO 88)
- Religion: Roman Catholic

Severin Anton Averdonk, real name Anton Clemens Averdonk, (1768 – 1817) was a German Roman Catholic clergyman and poet who represented the ideals of the Age of Enlightenment and the French Revolution. He wrote the texts for at least one cantata that Ludwig van Beethoven composed.

== Life ==
Averdonk was a brother of the court singer Johanna Helene Averdonk. He completed five high school classes in Bonn and received numerous awards. He then attended two philosophical courses at university and began studying theology in 1789.

Averdonk was supported by Eulogius Schneider. In 1790 the latter suggested the Bonner Lesegesellschaft should commission a cantata on the deceased emperor Joseph II in order to make the funeral ceremonies worthy. For this an elegy should be used, which Averdonk, at that time "Canon Regular of the Order of the Holy Cross" in Kloster Ehrenstein, candidate at the Rheinische Friedrich-Wilhelms-Universität Bonn by then had already written. It bore the title Ode auf den Tod Josephs und Elisens.

Beethoven, who was moved by the theme of the Enlightenment, then composed the Cantata on the Death of Emperor Joseph II. The text of the Kantate auf die Erhebung Leopolds II. zur Kaiserwürde was also probably written by Averdonk.

Averdonk was displeased by the Elector-Archbishop Max Franz, who in 1791 called him a monk qualifying for pastoral care, but who had become a "Minnesinger". Averdonk was also among the poets who wrote contributions in 1813 to celebrate the 25th anniversary of the reading society.

After the French Revolution, whose ideals he shared, Averdonk emigrated to Alsace and was priest in Uffholtz and president of the Société des Amis de la Liberté et de l'Égalité there. He wrote contributions for Eulogius Schneider's Jacobin magazine Argos.

The quality of Averdonk's sealing works were not appreciated by many later on. Words such as "epigonal poetry" were mentioned, and there was also talk of a meanwhile comical horror metaphor in the cantata about the death of the emperor.
