= Friedrich Burgmüller =

German pianist and composer

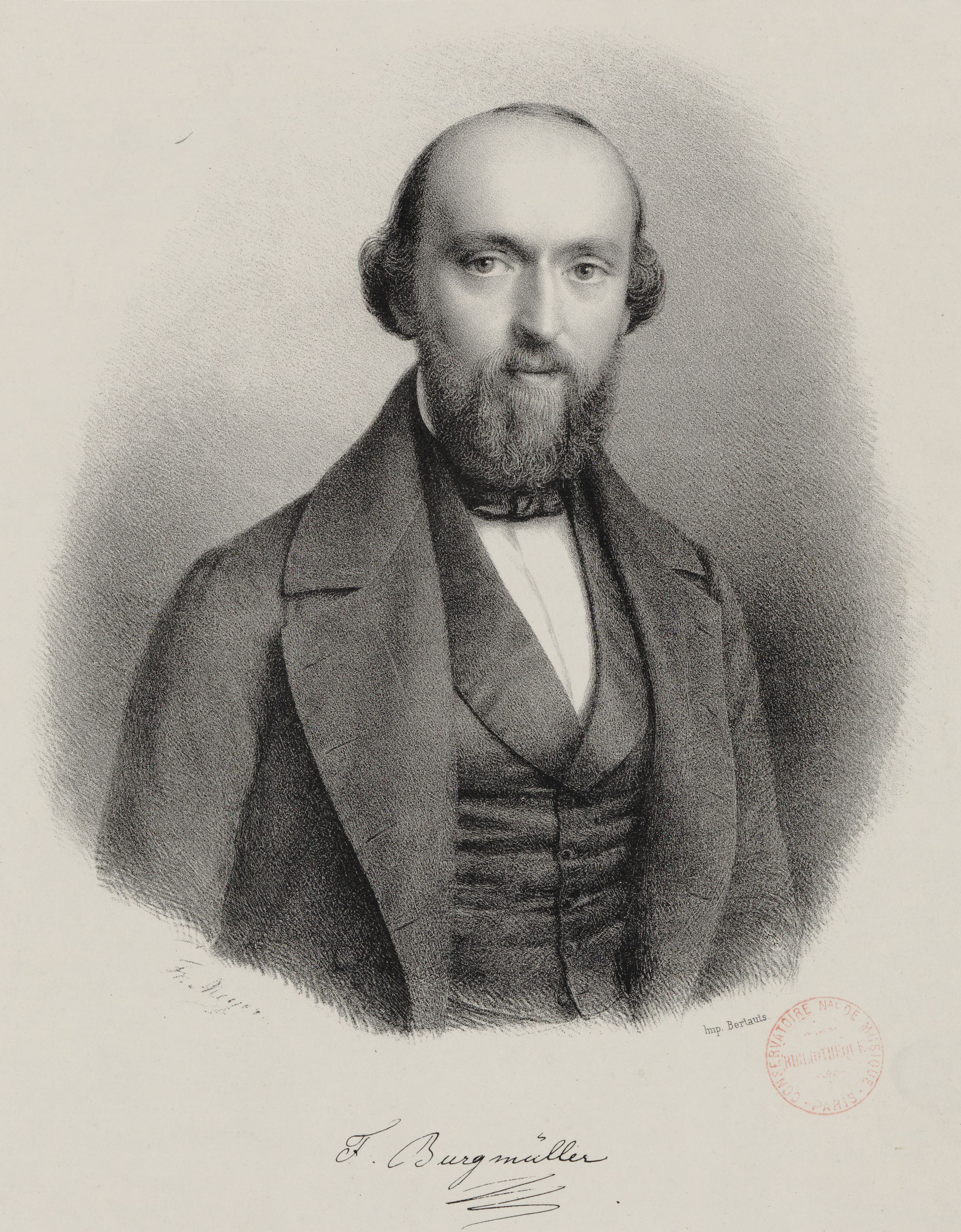
Johann Friedrich Franz Burgmüller from a lithograph, c.1840

Johann Friedrich Franz Burgmüller, generally known as Friedrich Burgmuller (4 December 1806 – 13 February 1874) was a German pianist and composer during the Romantic period. He is perhaps best known for his three collections of children's etudes (or "teaching pieces") for the piano, particularly his Op. 100 "25 Études faciles et progressives" (25 Easy and Progressive Studies) for early intermediate students. The other two collections, for more advanced students, were Op. 105 and 109.

== Life ==
Friedrich Burgmüller was born in Ratisbon (at that time part of the Principality of Regensburg, Confederation of the Rhine). His father Friedrich August Burgmüller and his younger brother Norbert Burgmüller were also composers. His mother was pianist and singer Therese von Zandt.

He moved to Kassel in 1829 to study with Ludwig Spohr and Moritz Hauptmann. There he appeared as a pianist for his first concert, January 14, 1830.

Burgmüller moved to Paris in 1832 (at age 26), where he stayed until his death. Norbert Burgmüller, his brother, made plans to join him in Paris, in 1835. However, he drowned in a spa in Aachen during an epileptic seizure a year later. In Paris, Burgmüller adopted Parisian music and developed his trademark (light) style of playing. He wrote many pieces of salon music for the piano and published several albums. Burgmüller also went on to compose piano études intended for children. He died in Paris on February 13, 1874.

== Works ==
Burgmüller composed piano pieces, waltzes, nocturnes, polonaises and two ballets. His Peasant Pas de Deux was added to Adolphe Adam's ballet Giselle for its 1841 premiere. This music was originally titled Souvenirs de Ratisbonne.

=== Ballets ===
- La Péri
- Lady Harriet

Berceuse
From Études Opus 109, performed on an acoustic piano

Fountain
From Études Opus 109, performed on a digital piano

Pearls
From Études Opus 109, performed on a digital piano

Thunderstorm
From Études Opus 109, performed on a digital piano

=== With opus numbers ===
- 6 Mélodies gracieuses de Bellini, Op. 26
- Souvenir de Bellini, Op. 27
- Souvenir de Schönbrunn, Op. 32
- La Cachucha, Op. 36
- Murmures du Rhone, Op. 66
- Corbeille de roses, Op. 68
- Fleurs mélodiques, Op. 82
- Fantaisie brillante sur "Ernani" de Verdi, Op. 92
- Blaue Äuglein, Op. 93
- Les Étincelles, Op. 97
- 25 Études faciles et progressives, Op. 100
- 12 Études, Op. 105
- 18 Études, Op. 109

=== Without opus numbers ===
- L'Ange consolateur
- Ay Chiquita
- 3 Nocturnes, for cello and guitar
- Le Pardon de Ploërmel
- La Péri
- Souvenirs de Londres
- Ballade
