= Norbert Burgmüller =

German composer of the Romantic Era

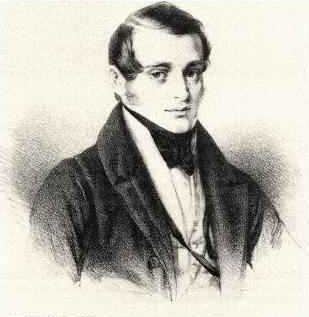
Norbert Burgmüller, lithograph by Jakob Becker

August Joseph Norbert Burgmüller (8 February 1810 – 7 May 1836) was a German composer, renowned for his contributions during the nascent stages of the Romantic Era. His oeuvre, albeit cut tragically short due to his untimely drowning at the age of 26, continues to resonate in the annals of classical music.

== Life ==
Burgmüller was born in Düsseldorf, the youngest son in a musical family. His father, August Burgmüller, was the director of a theatre. His mother, Therese von Zandt, was a singer and piano teacher. He had two brothers, Franz and Friedrich. Friedrich was also a composer. After the death of their father, the family had financial troubles. They were given support from Count Franz von Nesselrode-Ehreshoven.

Burgmüller studied with Joseph Kreutzer in Düsseldorf, and Louis Spohr and Spohr's pupil Moritz Hauptmann in Kassel. After his study he became their piano teacher. He became engaged to Sophia Roland, but in 1830 the relationship ended, to Norbert's distress. He became epileptic and began to drink excessively.

In the same year he returned to Düsseldorf to live with his mother. There he befriended Felix Mendelssohn. He became engaged to Josephine Collin, but this relationship ended too. After Mendelssohn left for Leipzig in 1835, Burgmüller made plans to leave for Paris, where his brother Friedrich had gone. In 1836 he went to a spa in Aachen, where he drowned during an epileptic seizure.

Robert Schumann, who arranged for the posthumous publication of Burgmüller's two symphonies, and completed the orchestration of the scherzo of the unfinished Symphony No. 2, wrote in a memorial notice that no death was more deplorable than that of Norbert Burgmüller since the early death of Franz Schubert.

== Works ==
The opus numbers do not correspond with the order of composition.

=== Orchestral works ===
- Piano Concerto in F♯ minor, Op. 1 (1829)
- Symphony No. 1 in C minor, Op. 2 (1831–33)
- Symphony No. 2 in D major, Op. 11 (1834/35, unfinished - the third part of this symphony, Scherzo, was completed by Robert Schumann: the Finale exists in some sketches only).
- Ouvertüre in F minor, Op. 5 (1825)
- 4 Entr'actes, Op. 17 (1827/28)

=== Vocal works ===
- "Dionys", Opera after Schiller's Ballad "Die Bürgschaft" (1832/34, Fragment)
- 6 Songs, Op. 3 (pub. 1838)
- 5 Songs, Op. 6 (pub. 1839)
- 5 Songs, Op. 10 (pub. 1840)
- 5 Songs, Op. 12 (pub. 1864)
- Frühlingslied in G major (pub. 1840)
- Morgenlied in E♭ major (1834, Fragment)

=== Chamber music ===
- String Quartet No. 1 in D minor, Op. 4 (1825)
- String Quartet No. 2 in D minor, Op. 7 (1825/26)
- String Quartet No. 3 in A♭ major, Op. 9 (1826)
- String Quartet No. 4 in A minor, Op. 14 (1835)
- Ständchen in E♭ major for clarinet (or cello), viola and guitar (1825)
- Duo in E♭ major for clarinet and piano, Op. 15 (1834)

=== Piano music ===
- Sonata in F minor, Op. 8 (1826)
- Waltz in E♭ major (1827)
- Mazurka in E♭ major
- Polonaise in F major, Op. 16 (1832)
- Rhapsody in B minor, Op. 13 (1834)

=== Lost works ===
- Instrumentation of Karl Blum's Quodlibet "Die Wiener in Berlin" (1827)
- Psalm 117 (1828)
- Song: In des Irrtisch weisse Fluten (1831)
- Male chorus for the "Epilog to Goethe's funeral eulogy" (1832)
- Incidental Music to "Albrecht Dürer's Dream" (1833)
- Festival chorus for the All-Highest Birthday Celebration of His Majesty (1834)
- Easter Cantata (1836)

== Recordings ==
- Carus 83.226: Symphonies Nos. 1 & 2. Performers: Hofkapelle Stuttgart, conducted by Frieder Bernius (2010)
- Carus 83.297: Piano Concerto Op. 1, Overture Op. 5 & Entr'actes Op. 17. Performers: Hofkapelle Stuttgart, conducted by Frieder Bernius (2013)
- Genuin 86061: Complete Works for Piano (Op. 8, 13, 15, 16, Mazurka & Waltz). Performer: Tobias Koch. (2006)
- MDG Gold 335 0817: Orchestral Works. Piano Concerto Op. 1, Symphony No. 2 & Overture Op. 5. Performers: Wuppertal Symphony Orchestra, conducted by Gernot Schmalfuss. (1998)
- MDG Gold 336 0993: String Quartets Op. 7 & 14. Performers: Mannheimer Streichquartett. (2000)
- MDG Gold 336 0994: String Quartets Op. 4 & 9. Performers: Mannheimer Streichquartett. (2003)
- Querstand 0916: Songs & Chamber Music. Complete Songs Op. 3, 6, 10, 12 & Frühlingslied; Op. 13, 15 (version for violin) & Ständchen for clarinet, viola & guitar. Performers: Ulrike Fulde, soprano; Manja Raschka, mezzo-soprano; Andreas Fisher, tenor; Felix Plock, bass & Kristin Henneberg, piano. (2010)
