= Cantata on the Death of Emperor Joseph II =

- by Ludwig van Beethoven
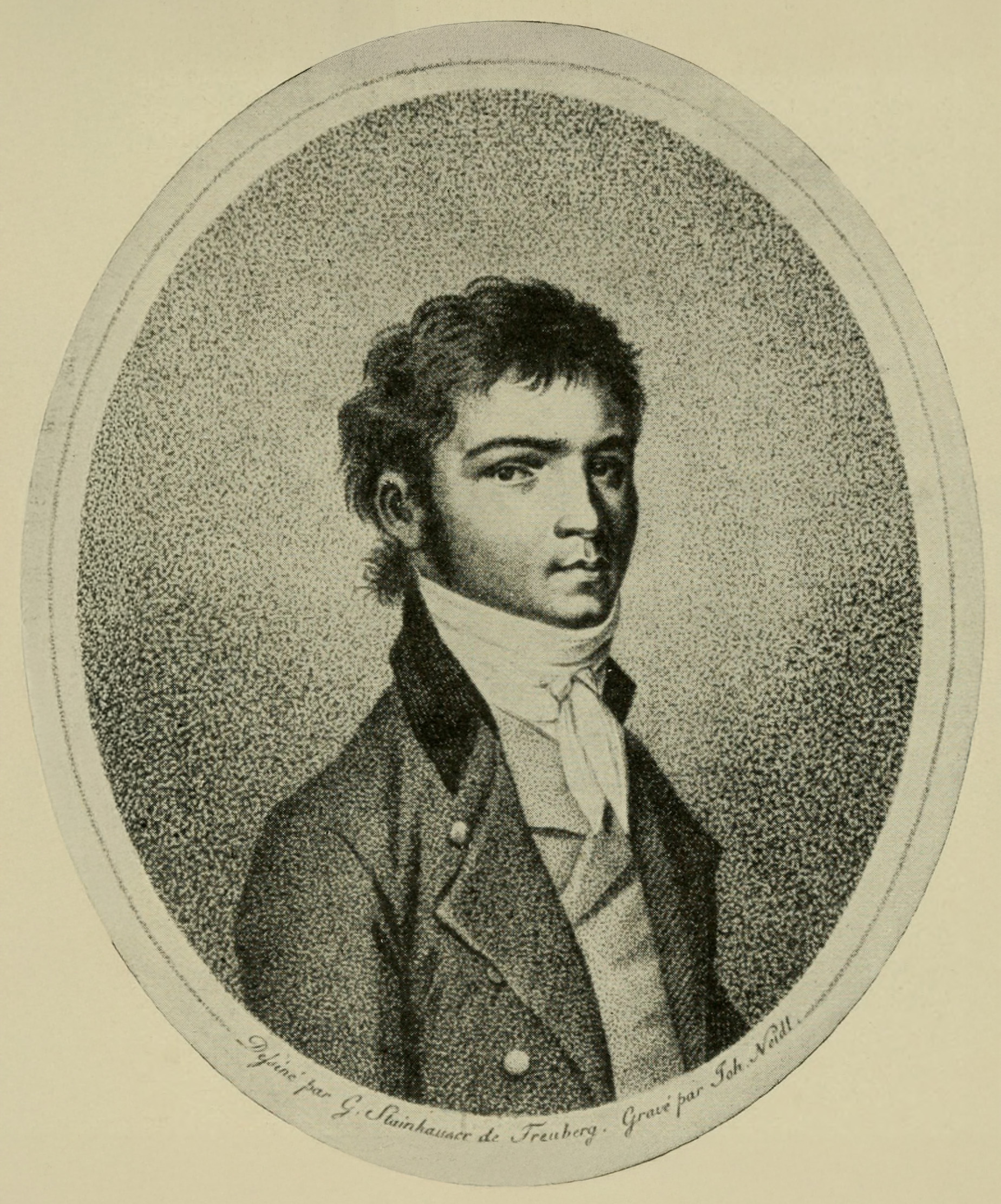
- Ludwig van Beethoven, c. 1796
- Native name: Kantate auf den Tod Kaiser Josephs II
- Key: C minor
- Catalogue: WoO 87
- Period: Classical
- Form: Cantata
- Text: Severin Anton Averdonk
- Language: German
- Composed: 1790
- Dedication: Emperor Joseph II
- Duration: ca. 40 minutes
- Movements: 7
- Vocal: Soloists (soprano, alto, tenor, bass), mixed choir
- Instrumental: Orchestra

Ludwig van Beethoven's Cantata on the Death of Emperor Joseph II (German: Kantate auf den Tod Kaiser Josephs II), WoO 87 is a cantata with a libretto by Severin Anton Averdonk (1768–1817), written in 1790 and intended for a memorial service for Joseph II, Holy Roman Emperor to be held in Bonn. Composed when Beethoven was nineteen, it was neither published, nor apparently performed until it premiered in Vienna in November 1884, fifty-seven years after Beethoven's death, and it was first printed in an 1888 supplement to the Complete Works. It remains one of Beethoven's lesser-known works.

Another cantata written more or less in tandem with WoO 87 is the Cantata on the Accession of Emperor Leopold II, WoO 88.

== Structure ==
The cantata, written in C minor, has seven movements.

1. Coro. Largo - Larghetto (C minor)
2. Recitativo. Presto (A minor)
3. Aria. Allegro maestoso – Allegro assai (D major)
4. Aria con Coro. Andante con moto (F major)
5. Recitativo. Largo (D minor)
6. Aria. Adagio con affetto (E♭ major)
7. Coro. Largo – Larghetto (C minor)

== Composition ==
The work is scored for 2 flutes, 2 oboes, 2 clarinets, 2 bassoons, 2 horns, strings and SATB chorus with solo soprano and bass (there is also a solo semichorus SSATB). The seven movements take approximately 35 minutes to perform. The aria with chorus in the fourth section would eventually be used in the opera Fidelio.

== See also ==
- Beethoven and C minor
