= Friederike Vohs =

German actress, singer and opera singer

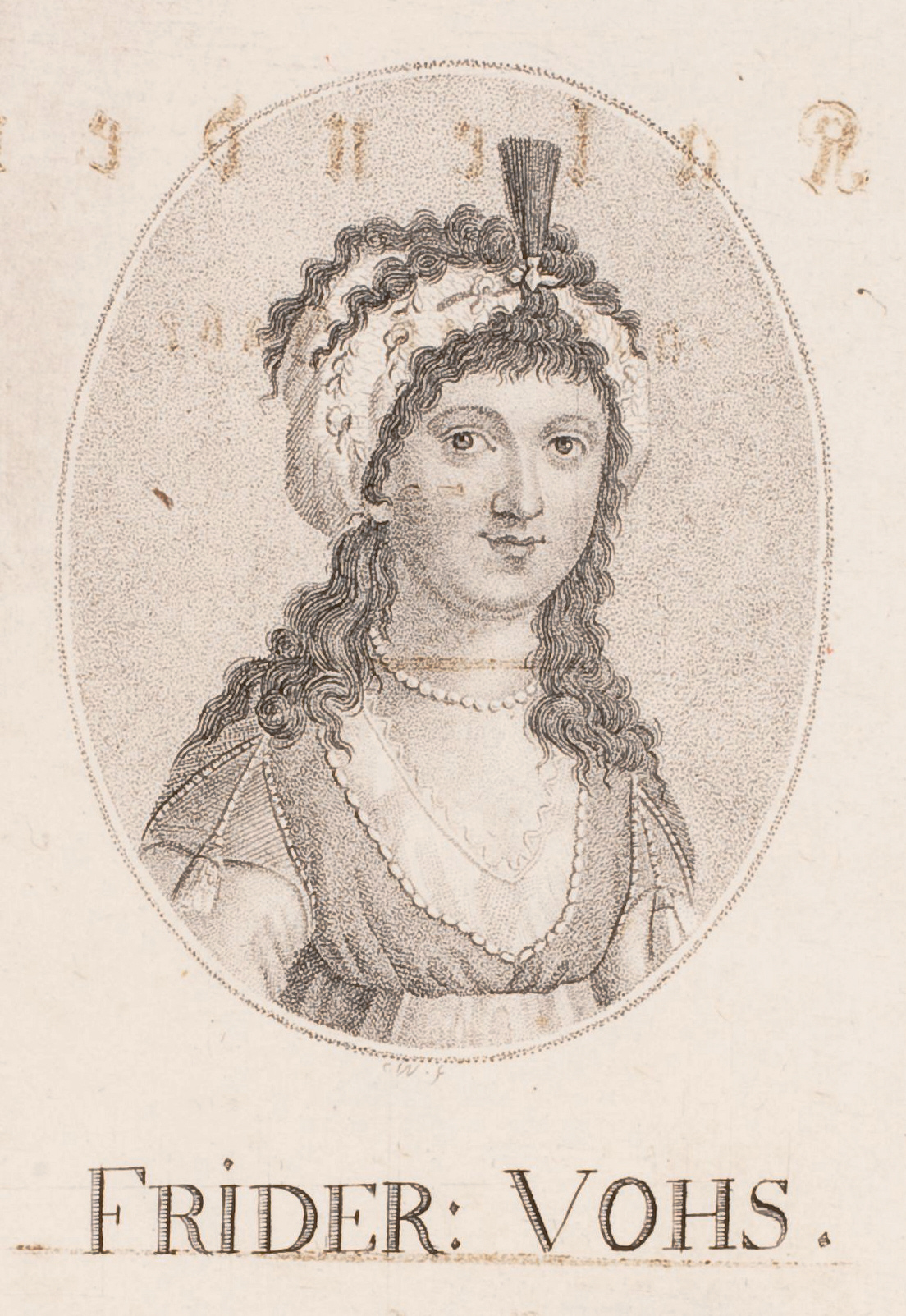
Friederike Vohs, 1799

Friederike Margarethe Vohs, née Friederike Margarethe Porth (1777 – 10 June 1860) was a German actress and operatic soprano.

== Life ==
Born in Halberstadt, Porth came with her parents to the theater in Weimar in 1793 where she married the actor Heinrich Vohs on 29 June 1793. With him she had five children.

Vohs was the first actress to impersonate the title role in Schiller's drama Maria Stuart in the world premiere on 14 June 1800 at the Deutsches Nationaltheater and Staatskapelle Weimar. She was also the first Thekla in Schiller's Wallenstein in Bad Lauchstädt. Further roles she created were Kreusa in Ion by August Wilhelm Schlegel in 1801, Turandot in the eponymous drama by Schiller as well as Iphigenie in Goethe's drama Iphigenia in Tauris, namely in the new production of 1802. Thanks to her singing talent she also found recognition in opera roles, but went with her husband to Stuttgart in 1802. As his widow she became the mother of an illegitimate daughter of the Prince Paul of Württemberg in 1805. Through this daughter, Karoline, Vohs is an ancestor of British Prime Minister Boris Johnson.

She became a member of the Vienna Hoftheater in 1808, was engaged in Frankfurt from 1805 to 1817 and at the Morettisches Opernhaus from 1818 to 1839. In 1818 she married in second marriage the Dresden court actor Friedrich August Werdy (1770–1847).

A portrait previously thought to be of Goethe's wife Christiane Vulpius, a chalk drawing by Friedrich Bury from the year 1800, in fact shows Friederike Vohs.

Vohs died in Frankfurt.
