= Bernhard Helmich =

German theatrte manager

Bernhard Helmich (born 13 August 1962) is a German theatre manager.

== Activities ==
Born in Idar-Oberstein, from 1981 to 1987 Helmich studied musical theatre directing with Götz Friedrich as well as literature and musicology in Cologne and Hamburg; he received his doctorate there in 1989. For a time, he was assistant director at the Hamburg State Opera and at the Komische Oper Berlin.

From 1989 to 1992, Helmich worked at the National Theatre Taipei, lectured at Fu Jen Catholic University, and worked for the government's cultural agency. From 1992, Helmich was a dramaturge at the Theater Trier and Bielefeld. From 1995 to 2001, he worked as a dramaturge and advisor to the general director at Theater Dortmund. From 2001 to 2005, he was chief dramaturge at the Leipzig Opera and director of the Musikalische Komödie.

From 2006 to 2013, Helmich was general director of the Städtische Theater Chemnitz. During this time, the Chemnitz Opera with its general music director Frank Beermann and the theatre under the direction of Enrico Lübbe attracted attention with numerous awards and prizes. One focus was on first performances or revivals of rarely performed operas, which were also broadcast on the radio and released on CD or DVD. For example, the Meyerbeer's production Vasco da Gama, a rarely performed version of the opera "The African", was awarded the Klassik-Echo.

Since the 2013/14 season, Helmich has been general director at Theater Bonn, where he first worked with theatre director Nicola Bramkamp and since 2018 with theatre director Jens Groß. In addition to the established repertoire in opera, musical, and operetta, the focus of the work in musical theatre is a cycle of early works by Giuseppe Verdi, the rediscovery of numerous works from the 1920s and early 1930s, as well as regular premieres and first performances. In 2018, the house was voted North Rhine-Westphalia's Opera of the Year in the Die Welt critics' poll. From the 2020/21 season, the Bonn Theatre will receive a total of €1.3 million from the "New Ways" funding programme for the "Fokus '33" programme series.

Helmich is married to choreographer Lin Mei-hong. From 2013 to 2022, she was ballet director at the Landestheater Linz in Upper Austria.
