= Burgsmüller =

Burgsmüller (German for miller at a castle) is a German surname. Notable people with the surname include:

- Lars Burgsmüller (born 1975), German tennis player
- Manfred Burgsmüller (1949–2019), German football player
- Wilhelm Burgsmüller (1932–2025), German football player
