= Anna Feodorowna Krüger =

Anna Feodorowna Krüger (born Anna Feodorowna Spengler: 28 February 1792 - 4 August 1814) was a German stage actress of great promise who died young.

== Life ==
Anna Feodorowna Spengler was born in Saint Petersburg which at that time was home to a large and apparently permanent German expatriate community. Her mother, Karoline Spengler, was a stage actress. Her father, Franz Spengler, was a theatre director from Prague. However, he died while she was still young. When the child was ten her mother married a third husband, the actor Karl Friedrich Krüger: he adopted Anna. Mother and daughter now became respectively Karoline Krüger and Anna Krüger: these are the names by which they are normally identified in sources.

Her parents recognised and encouraged her talent as an actress. She made her stage debut as "Amalie" in Schickaneder's Hauer in Österreich at Schickaneder's recently opened and lavishly appointed Theater an der Wien (in Vienna) on 1 September 1804. The play appears not to have survived, but Schickaneder's new theatre prospered and Anna Krüger remained there as part of the company till 1808 or 1809.

In 1808 Emanuel Schikaneder took a position as director at the Reduta Theatre in Brünn (as the city was known to German speakers at the time). Anna Feodorowna was among those who went with him, and it was here that she took her first major stage roles. However, by 1809 she was back in Vienna where at Easter of that year she made her debut at the Hofbühne Theater, where her (adoptive) father was already an established member of the company. It was here that she came to the fore as a performer.

In 1814 she enjoyed great success appearing for a season of guest performances down-river at Pest. On 19 July 1814 she made her last stage appearance, taking the part of "Afanasia" in "Benjowsky". By this time she had developed what were probably complications from Typhus ("Nervenfieber"). She had evidently been infected - seemingly without taking time out for proper treatment - for some time. She died on 4 August 1814 and was buried amidst much ceremony on the part of theatre friends and colleagues on the section reserved for artists who had died young in the cemetery at Pest.
