= Karl Christian Ernst von Bentzel-Sternau =

German statesman and writer (1767–1849)

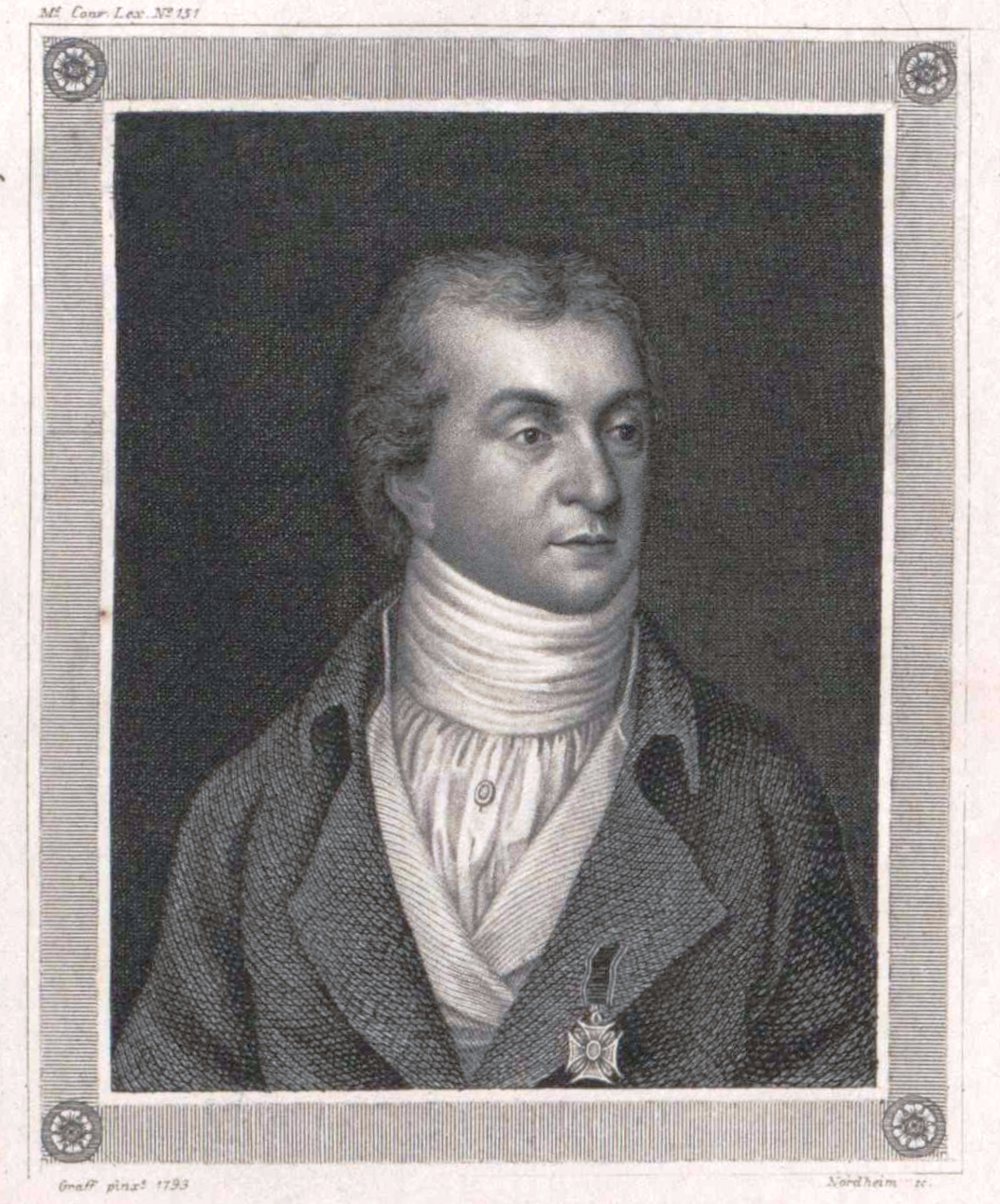
- Born: April 17, 1767; Mainz, Electorate of Mainz, Holy Roman Empire
- Died: August 13, 1849 (aged 82); Switzerland

Karl Christian Ernst Graf von Bentzel-Sternau, pseud. Horatio Cocles, (9 April 1767 – 13 August 1849) was a German statesman, editor and writer.

== Life ==
Bentzel-Sternau was born in Mainz. After jurisprudential studies, in 1791 Bentzel-Sternau became government counsellor of the Electorate of Mainz under Karl Theodor von Dalberg in Erfurt. In 1803 he was State councillor of the Kur-Erzkanzler in Regensburg and in 1804 Secret State councillor. In 1806 he entered the Baden services, became ministerial director in 1808 and president of the upper court in 1810 in Mannheim.

Dalberg, now Grand Duke of Frankfurt appointed by Napoleon, appointed him Minister of State and Finance in 1811. He was also responsible, among other things, for Jewish emancipation and its bourgeois equality.

After the Grand Duchy of Frankfurt had been occupied by the German powers allied against Napoleon in the autumn of 1813 - it was not dissolved until the summer of 1814 - Bentzel-Sternau withdrew into private life. He lived alternately in Schloss Emmerichshofen and his country estate on Lake Zurich. In the following years he worked as an editor and writer.

He again proved his liberal and committed attitude as a delegate of the Bavarian Chamber of Estates in the years 1825 to 1828. In 1832 he sympathized with the participants of the Hambach Festival and sent them a letter to express his support.

In 1827 he converted from Catholicism to evangelical faith.

Bentzel-Sternau died in Mariahalden/Zürichsee, Switzerland, at age 82.

== Work ==
Bentzel-Sternau is known to posterity above all as the editor of the magazine 'Jason' and as a novelist. In 1831 he founded the short-lived magazine Der Verfassungsfreund, a newspaper of the Landtag for Germany.

He became famous for his work "Anti-Israel-Rede" (1818), a projective satire which made him particularly hated by nationalist forces. During the Wartburg Festival his works were symbolically burned with other books.

This satire is a rare source for exploring the relationship between Jews and Christians in the 19th century. It is preserved today in only a small number of originals. His best-known work is probably the prose text Das goldene Kalb. A Biography.

In this satire, Bentzel takes up the arguments and demands of the literary Jew hunt, which had found fertile ground after the Congress of Vienna, and takes them to absurdity by exaggerating them.

Visionary, the author predicts a development that was soon caught up in the horrors of the anti-Jewish Hep-Hep riots in Germany. Bentzel was apparently aware of the pronounced anti-Jewish dynamics and the great potential for violence that had accumulated against the Jews in the period after the Congress of Vienna - spurred on by inflammatory writings and pamphlets published in many places. Exemplary here are the inflammatory writings of Friedrich Rühs and Jakob Friedrich Fries.

In his literary publications he shows himself to be an "ingenious, outspoken and intelligent humorous writer" (Meyer 1858), often compared with Jean Paul.

== Pseudonym ==
The pseudonym chosen by Bentzel-Sternau refers to Horatius Cocles (cocles: Latin for "one-eyed man"), who was a folk hero of Roman mythology. In 507 B.C. he is said to have defended the bridge over the Tiber to Rome alone against the Etruscans.

== Quotes ==
"The mixture, called man, is probably the greatest ragout that ever escaped a heavenly cookbook."

== Sources ==
- Der Verfassungsfreund, ein Landtagsblatt für Deutschland. Hanau, 1831.
