= Antonín Jiránek =

Antonín Jiránek (German: Anton Giranek; c. 1712 – 16 January 1761) was a Czech violinist and composer.

== Life ==
Born in Mladá Boleslav in Bohemia, Jiránek was trained in Prague. He was the first violinist in the royal chapel in Warsaw and later in the Polish court chapel in Dresden. He composed symphonies, concerts, trio sonatas and vocal music in sensitive style. At the beginning of the 20th century, musicologists were able to attribute some of the works to his namesake František Jiránek.

Robert Eitner indicates that his daughter Franziska was the famous singer "Madame Koch" Another daughter was the theatre actress Karoline Krüger.

Jiránek died in Dresden on 16 January 1761.
