= Karl Haßloch =

German singer

Karl Theodor Haßloch (baptized 21 May 1769 – 23 August 1829) was a German stage actor and operatic tenor, bass and bariton, composer, Kapellmeister, Opera director, theater director and librettist.

== Life ==
Born in Amorbach, Haßloch worked from 1789 in Mannheim, where he replaced the actor Friedrich August Werdy, and married the singer Christiane Keilholz in 1793. From 1797 to 1806 he directed the theater in Kassel, which he left because of the occupation by Napoleonic troops. After that he went to Hamburg (1800-1801). In 1809 he went to Darmstadt as an opera director, where he also took over the post of court kapellmeister in 1813. He also made a guest appearance with his wife in Weimar in 1800 under Goethe.

He did not achieve an outstanding position as an actor but functioned more as his wife's husband. Nevertheless he was of rare versatility ("Don Carlos", "Tamino", "Don Giovanni"). As a singer he could be called a vocal phenomenon. He also sang both tenor and bass baritone parts.

In Darmstadt he became a member of the Johannes der Evangelist zur Eintracht masonic lodge.

Haßloch died in Darmstadt at age 60.

== Work ==
- Giafar und Zaide, oder die Ruinen von Babylon, eine große romantische Oper in 3 Aufzügen (1823), (Libretto)
