= Heinz von Loesch =

German university teacher and musicologist (born 1959)

Heinz von Loesch (born 20 May 1959) is a German musicologist. He researches and teaches at Technische Universität Berlin.

== Life ==
Born in Frankfurt, Loesch is the son of Achim von Loesch, the former director of the Bank für Gemeinwirtschaft, and the SPD politician Grete von Loesch.

At first he completed a cello study with Gerhard Mantel and Pierre Fournier, which he furthered with the artistic maturity examination in 1983. From 1980 to 1985 he was a member of the Junge Deutsche Philharmonie. At the same time he studied musicology with Carl Dahlhaus and Helga de la Motte-Haber at Technische Universität Berlin until 1991, where he received his doctorate in 1991 and his habilitation in 1999. Afterwards he was a research assistant at the State Institute for Music Research and then also professor at Technische Universität Berlin.

== Publications ==
- Das Cellokonzert von Beethoven bis Ligeti. Ästhetische und kompositionsgeschichtliche Wandlungen einer musikalischen Gattung, Phil. Diss. Berlin 1991, Frankfurt. 1992.
- Robert Schumann: Konzert für Violoncello und Orchester a-Moll op. 129, Munich 1998 (Meisterwerke der Musik 64).
- Der Werkbegriff in der protestantischen Music theory des 16. und 17. Jahrhunderts: Ein Mißverständnis, Hildesheim etc. 2001 (Studies on the History of Music Theory 1).
- Das Beethoven-Lexikon, edited by Heinz von Loesch and Claus Raab, Laaber 2008.
