= Franz Kirms =

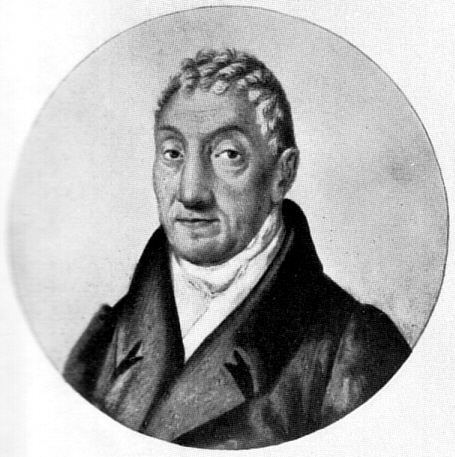
Franz Kirms

Franz Kirms (21 December 1750 – 3 May 1826) was the official comrade of Johann Wolfgang von Goethe in the management of the Weimar Theatre and as a flower lover. He was born in the Holy Roman Empire.

== Life ==
Kirms came from a family of civil servants who lived since 1701 in a house built around 1520 in Jakobstraße 10. He was a tax official from 1789 and from 1814 Privy Councillor in Weimar. Duke Karl August, Grand Duke of Saxe-Weimar-Eisenach entrusted him with the supervision of the Hofmarschall- and Stallamt. Besides, Kirms was a passionate flower lover to whom Duke Carl August handed over rare plants from his travels for breeding.

Since 1791 he supported Goethe at the Theaterintendanz. He was in charge of the actual business administration of the Weimar Theatre, which he led very skilfully and energetically after Goethe's retirement together with Count Albert Cajetan von Edling until his death. In 1808 the theater laws were published. Goethe valued highly his performance.

On 27 December 1823, at the age of 73, Kirms married the forty-two year old Erdmuthe Sophie, called Caroline, Krackow (1779-1866), who since 1804 was the partner of the hereditary great duchess Maria Pawlowna, the tsar's daughter and wife of the hereditary duke. The marriage remained childless.

Kims died in Weimar at the age of 75.

The burial place of the Kirms-Krackow family is located on the historical cemetery in Weimar.

== Appreciation ==
In a conversation with Chancellor Friedrich von Müller and Friedrich Soret on 16 March 1824, Goethe paid tribute to Franz Kirms in connection with his departure from the Theaterintendanz with the following words:

now,[...] Kirms has earned merits at a time when it was still a matter of saving, of doing a lot with a little. I didn't have a cent for my direction, I spent a lot of money to feed the actors and enjoyed the privilege of a sovereign to be generous to my heart's content. Yes, we are from an old, different time and need not be ashamed of it

— Johann Wolfgang von Goethe
