= Theater Bonn =

Theatre company

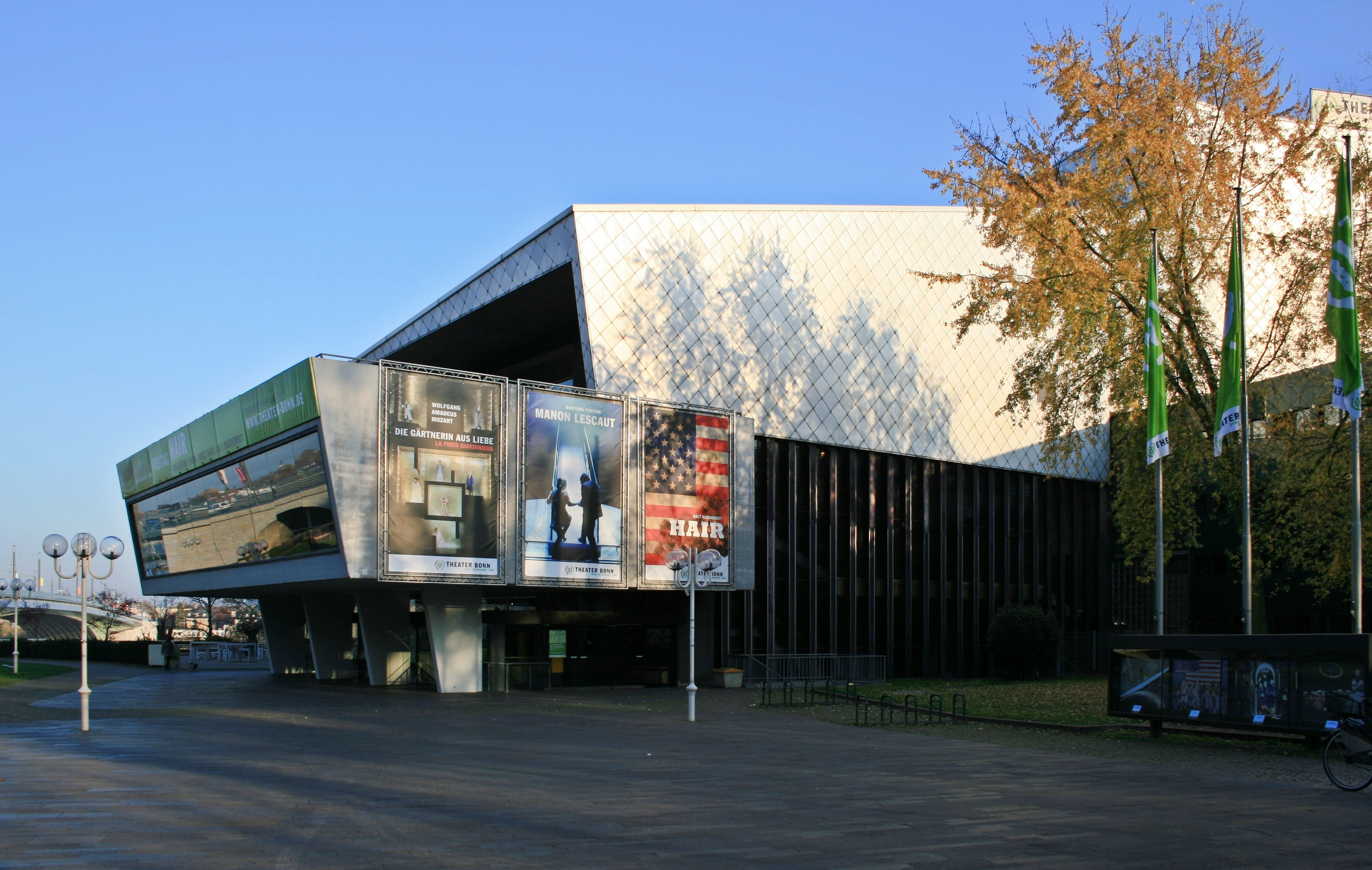
- Bonn Opera House, one of several venues

General information
- Location: Bonn, North Rhine-Westphalia, Germany
- Opened: 1965

Website
- www.theater-bonn.de

Theater Bonn (also known as the Stadttheater Bonn) is the municipal theatre company of Bonn, North Rhine-Westphalia, Germany. It is an organization that produces operas, musicals, ballets, plays, and concerts. It operates several performance venues throughout the town: Oper Bonn for music theatre, the Kammerspiele Bad Godesberg and Halle Beuel for plays, and the Choreographisches Theater for ballet and dance.

== History ==
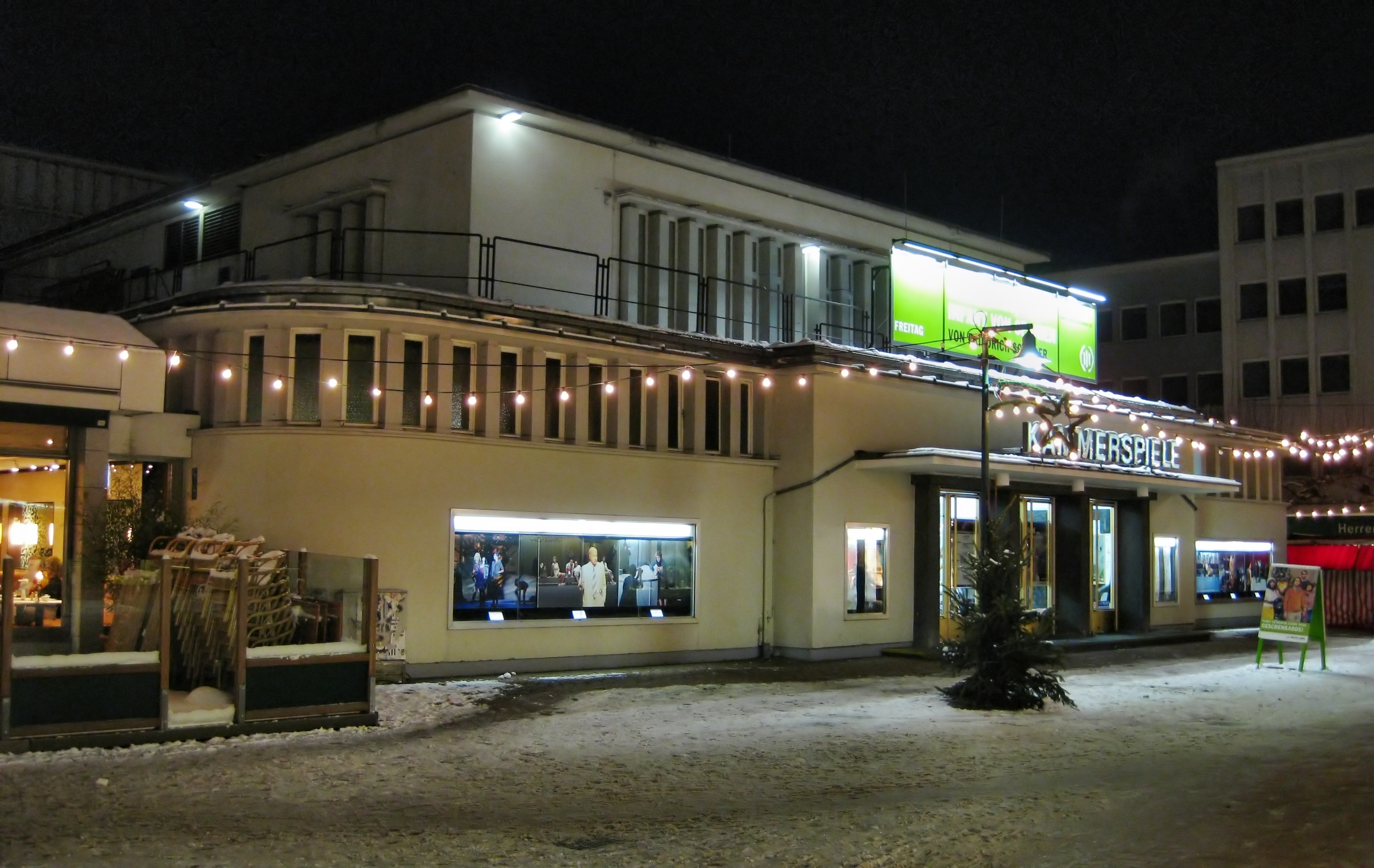
Kammerspiele, one of the venues for plays

The history of theatre in Bonn dates back to the time of the electors. End of the 17th century, a court theatre was established at the Electoral Palace, where French and Italian troupes played. In the 18th century, an amateur theatre was established for German plays (Nationaltheater), directed by Gustav Friedrich Wilhelm Großmann from 1778 to 1784, who staged the premiere of Schiller's Die Verschwörung des Fiesko zu Genua on 20 July 1783. The new French government destroyed the court theatre in 1797.

In 1826, citizens built their own play house. A new building was opened in 1848, marked by Beethoven's overture Die Weihe des Hauses (The Consecration of the House). The house became the municipal theatre in 1859, with performances by the Cologne theatre. Bonn dates the history of its responsibility for the theatre back to that year. The Bonn theatre operated with its own ensemble for plays from 1902, for opera from 1935. The theatre was destroyed by bombing during World War II in July 1943.

After World War II, temporary venues for theatre were a university hall, a gymnasium, a cinema, and the Prachtbau of the Bonner Bürgerverein, completed in 1909. In 1965, a new theatre was opened on the Rhine which serves as today's opera house. Intendant Karl Pempelfort focused on works by William Shakespeare, continued by his successor Hans-Joachim Heyse (1970–1981). Intendant Claude Riber invited international singers to perform opera, while plays focused on Austrian contemporary drama, initiated by Peter Eschberg.

Plays are performed in three venues: the Kammerspiele Bad Godesberg, the Halle Beuel, and the Werkstatt (workshop) in the opera house. Venues for experimental theatre and children's theatre are the Alter Malersaal and the Beuel area. Manfred Beilharz, Generalintendant from 1997 for eleven years, organized from 1992 with the dramatist Tankred Dorst a biennial festival for European contemporary theatre, Festival Bonner Biennale – Neue Stücke aus Europa. From 2013, Bernhard Helmich has been Generalintendant. The Theater Bonn collaborates with the festival Beethovenfest.

== Literature ==
- Manfred Brauneck, Gérard Schneilin (ed.): Theaterlexikon 1. Begriffe und Epochen, Bühnen und Ensembles. Rowohlts Enzyklopädie im Rowohlt Taschenbuch Verlag, Reinbek bei Hamburg 1986, 5th edition, 2007, ISBN 978-3-499-55673-9.
