= František Jiránek =

František Jiránek (24 July 1698 – 1778) was a Czech Baroque composer and violinist. He was very likely a student of Antonio Vivaldi.

== Life ==
Jiránek was born on 24 July 1698 in Lomnice nad Popelkou (Northern Bohemia, present-day Czech Republic). His parents were servants of the Counts of Morzin; František also started to work for them as a musician. Count Václav Morzin (Czech: cs:Václav z Morzinu) sent him to Venice in 1724 to improve his musical abilities. His teacher was probably Antonio Vivaldi himself. Count Václav Morzin was a very important supporter of Vivaldi (Vivaldi dedicated his famous Four Seasons to him).

In 1726 Jiránek came back to Prague and worked as a violinist in the Prague ensemble of Václav Morzin. Antonín Reichenauer and Johann Friedrich Fasch also worked in this ensemble. After the death of Václav Morzin in 1737 Jiránek left Prague and was employed by the Prime Minister of Saxony, Heinrich von Brühl in Dresden. In Dresden his work was informed by the rise of Classical music. After the death of Brühl in 1763 he retired and died in Dresden in 1778.

== Works ==
Only Jiránek's instrumental works have been preserved (e.g. violin concertos, symphonies or concertos). His work was strongly influenced by Vivaldi's musical style, although it has also many original distinctive elements. In fact their styles are so similar that Jiránek's works have occasionally been misattributed to Vivaldi. See, for example, the Violin Concerto in D major RV Anh. 8, which is now known to have been a Jiránek composition, catalogued as Jk Ap. 1.

== Discography ==
- In 2010 Supraphon issued the CD František Jiránek / "Concertos & Sinfonias" with recordings by Collegium Marianum.
- In 2016 Supraphon issued a second CD František Jiránek / "Concertos" with Collegium Marianum.
