= Claus Raab =

German musicologist

Claus Raab (1943 – 14 October 2012) was a German musicologist and university scholar.

== Life ==
Born in Herrieden (Mittelfranken), Raab studied historical and comparative musicology and philosophy at the Freie Universität Berlin. In 1970 he received his doctorate in drum music about the Hausa people in North-West-Nigeria and in 1972 became a lecturer at the Folkwang University of the Arts. In 2008 he retired and died in Essen.

== Publications ==
- Trommelmusik der Hausa in Nord-West-Nigeria, Munich: Renner, 1970
- Folkwang: Geschichte einer Idee; Musik, Tanz, Theater, Wilhelmshaven: Noetzel, 1994
- Beethovens Kunst der Sonate. Die drei letzten Klaviersonaten op. 109, 110, 111 und ihr Thema, Saarbrücken: Pfau, 1996
- Merkwürdige Geschichten und Gestalten um einen Walzer: Ludwig van Beethovens "Diabelli Variations op. 120 und ihre Verbindung zu Graphik und Literatur, Saarbrücken: Pfau, 1999
- Das Beethoven-Lexikon, edited by Claus Raab and Heinz von Loesch, Laaber 2008
