= Friedrich Demmer (tenor) =

Austrian opera singer

Friedrich Demmer (1785 – 15 April 1838) was an Austrian operatic tenor, actor and director and possibly the first Florestan in Beethoven's Fidelio.

== Life ==
Born in Berlin, Demmer was a son of Carl Demmer, who was active at the Theater an der Wien from 1804. Already in 1807/08 a "son of Mr. Demmer" - most likely Friedrich Demmer - belonged to the ensemble of the Theater an der Wien.

In 1821 he is listed in the Viennese list of artists by Franz Heinrich Böckh.

In December 1824 the actor Carl Friedrich Müller published a Musikalisches Angebinde zum neuen Jahre, "dedicated to his esteemed friend Mr. Friedrich Demmer, director of the "Theater an der Wien", which also contains a work by Ludwig van Beethoven: the waltz in E-flat major WoO 84, written on 21 November 1824.

Demmer was active at the theater in later years as a director. From September 1829 to 1834 he worked as a singer and then until his death as chief director of the Theater am Kärntnertor.

On 15 April 1838, "Mr. Friedrich Demmer, director in the Imperial and Royal Court Theatre next to the Kärntnerthor, aged 52, died ". In a short obituary, Ignaz Franz Castelli wrote: "Mr. Demmer was a capable actor, a brave musician, and capell master, an exemplary director and - a brave man."

In retrospect, Ferdinand von Seyfried called him a "universal genius".
