= Heinrich Vohs =

German actor and singer (1763–1804)

Johann Heinrich Andreas Vohs (probably 16 March 1763 in Kleve – 16 July 1804 in Stuttgart) was a German actor and singer.

== Life ==
From 1787 Vohs belonged to the touring troupe of Christian Wilhelm Klos, who played in the Rhineland, and from 1789 to February 1790 to the Theater Bonn, where the young Ludwig van Beethoven played in the orchestra. He then joined Peter Matthias Rheinberg's touring troupe.

On 30 May 1792 Vohs made his debut in Weimar, where he met great success in the role of Carl Moor in Schiller's drama The Robbers on 9 June. Goethe soon entrusted him with the direction. On 29 June 1793 he married the 14 years younger actress Friederike Porth with whom he had five children.

Other important roles included Max Piccolomini in Die Piccolomini (premiere on 30 January 1799) and Wallenstein's Death (premiere on 20 April 1799) as well as the title role in Macbeth in Schiller's arrangement (premiere on 14 May 1800). In the world premiere of Schiller's Mary Stuart on 14 June 1800 he impersonated Mortimer, and his wife the title role.

In September 1802 he went with his wife to Stuttgart and took over the post of artistic director at the Hoftheater.

He died there at the age of 41.
