= Ignaz Franz Castelli =

Austrian dramatist

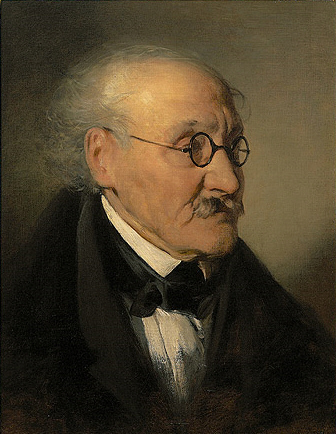
Ignaz Franz Castelli; portrait by Friedrich von Amerling

Ignaz Franz Castelli (6 March 1781 – 5 February 1862) was an Austrian dramatist born in Vienna. He studied law at university, and then entered government service.

During the Napoleonic invasions his patriotism inspired him to write stirring war songs, one of which, Kriegslied für die österreichische Armee, was printed by order of the Archduke Charles of Austria and distributed in thousands. For this Castelli was proclaimed by Napoleon in Le Moniteur, and had to seek refuge in Hungary.

In 1815 he accompanied the allies into France as secretary to Count Cavriani, and, after his return to Vienna, resumed his official post in connection with the estates of Lower Austria. In 1842 he retired to his property at Lilienfeld, where, surrounded by his notable collections of pictures and other art treasures, he for the rest of his life devoted himself to literature.

Castelli's dramatic talent was characteristically Austrian; his plays were well constructed, effective and satirized unsparingly the foibles of the Viennese. However, his wit was too local and ephemeral to appeal to any but his own generation, and if he is remembered at all today it is by his excellent Gedichte in niederösterreichischer Mundart (1828). He died at Lilienfeld on the 5th of February 1862, at the age of 80.

Castelli's Gesammelte Gedichte ("Collected poems") appeared in 1835 in 6 vols.; a selection of his Werke in 1843 in 15 vols. (2nd ed., 1848), followed by supplementary volumes in 1858. His autobiography, Memoiren meines Lebens, appeared in 1861–1862 in 4 volumes. He knew and worked with Ludwig van Beethoven as well as Franz Schubert.
