= Gustav Friedrich Wilhelm Großmann =

German actor and director

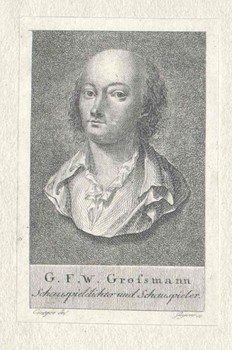
Gustav Friedrich Wilhelm Grossmann

Gustav Friedrich Wilhelm Großmann (30 November 1746, Berlin; 20 May 1796, Hanover) was a German actor, writer, and stage director. He wrote the text of the famous operatic Schauspiel mit Gesang Adelheit von Veltheim, with music by Christian Gottlob Neefe (Frankfurt 1780).

In 1778, he became director of the Prince Elector Archbishop of Cologne court theatre in Bonn and had close contact with the young Ludwig van Beethoven. In 1784, he set up a theatre company, with which he toured several places in Germany and finally stayed in Hanover.
