= Hans Otto Theatre =

Theatre in Potsdam

Coordinates: 52°24′11″N 13°4′31″E

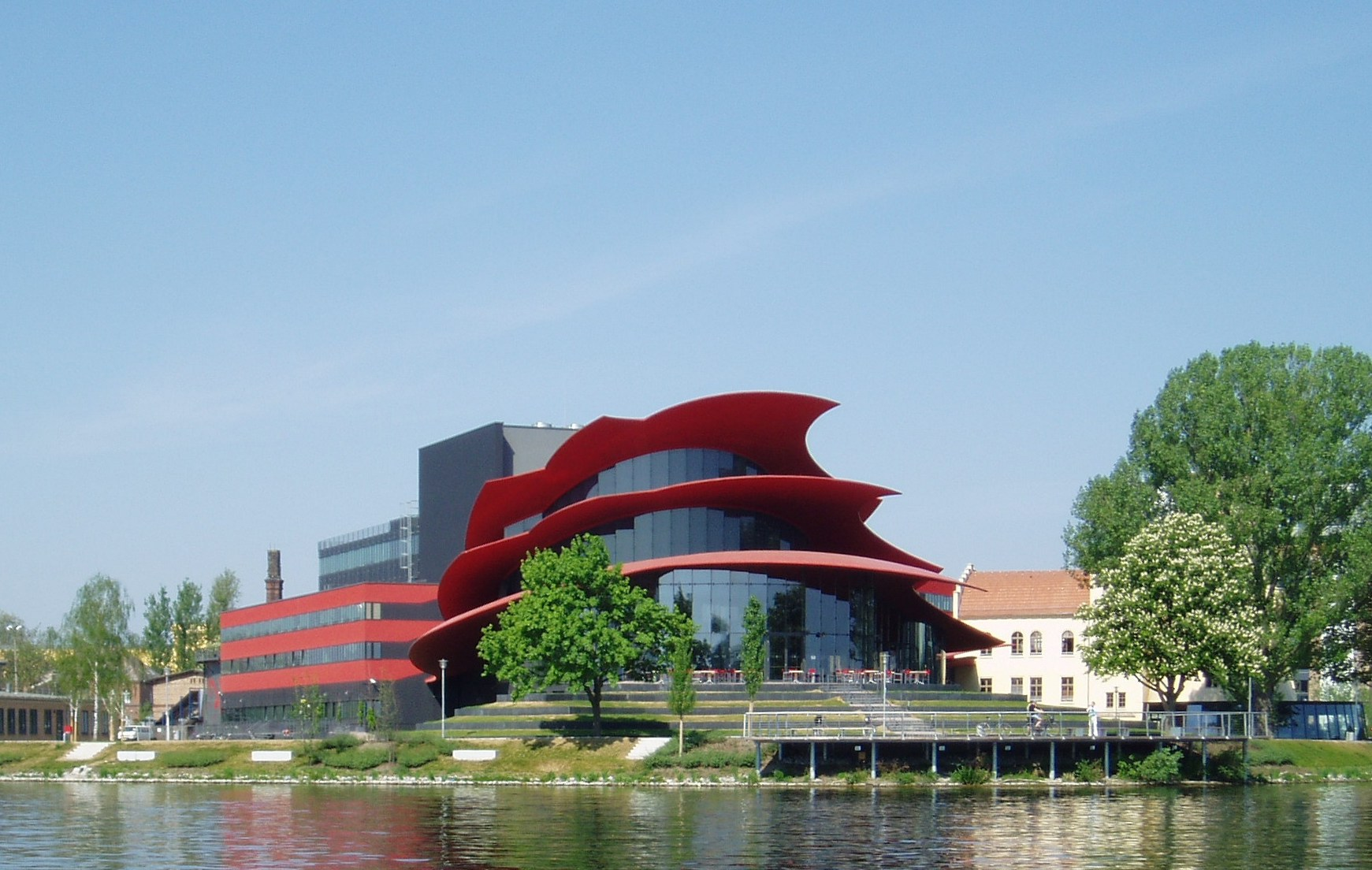
Stammhaus der Hans Otto Theater GmbH vom Tiefer See aus, 2007

The Hans Otto Theatre (German: Hans-Otto-Theater), named after the actor Hans Otto, is a municipal theatre in Potsdam in Germany. Its headquarters and main venue is in the Großes Haus am Tiefen See in Potsdam's cultural district on Schiffbauergasse. Other regular venues are the neighbouring historic Reithalle and occasionally the Palace Theatre in the Neues Palais.

== History ==
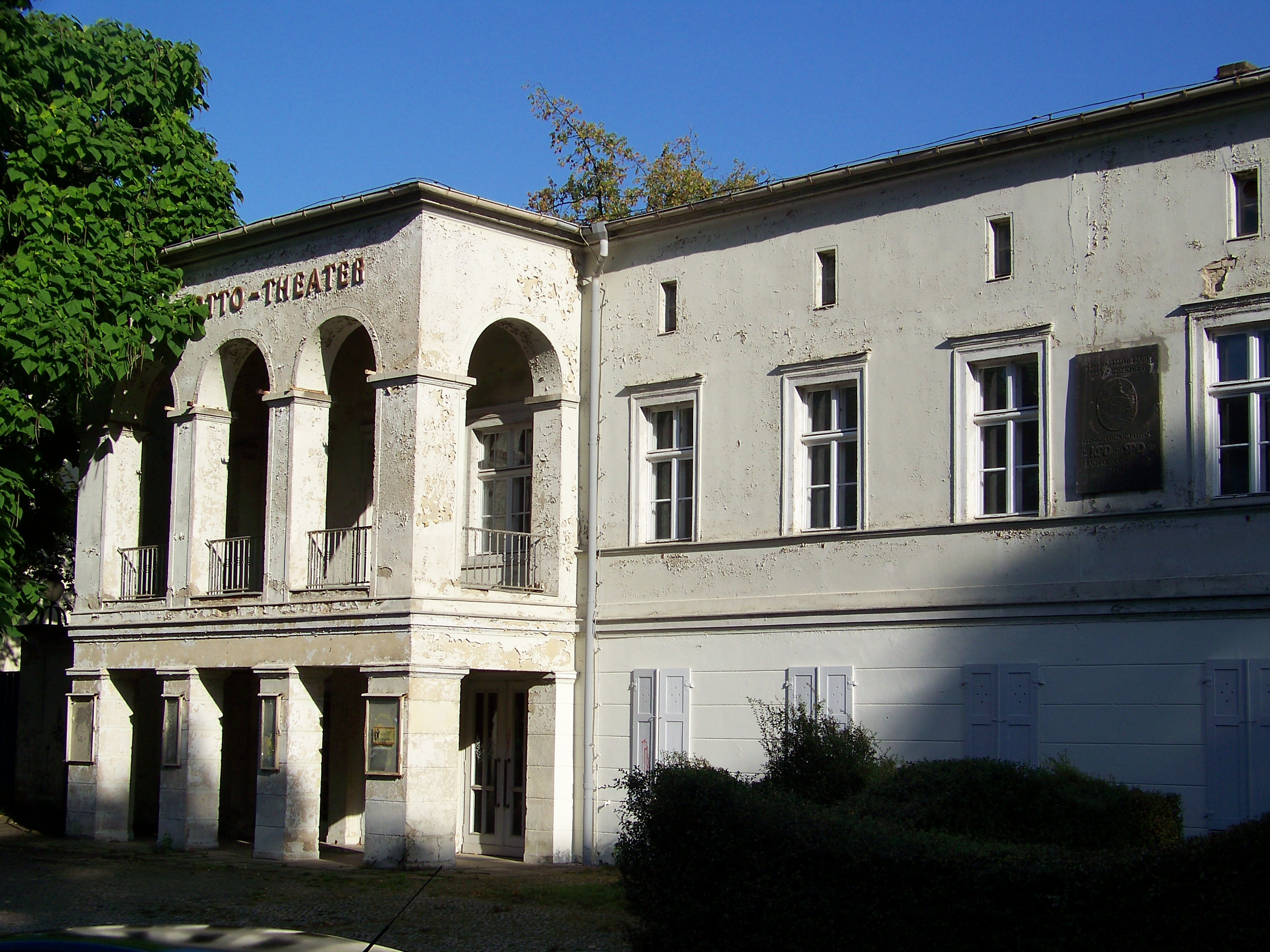
alte Spielstätte in der Zimmerstraße

In 1946, the Brandenburg State Theatre was founded and initially found its venue in the baroque palace theatre of the Neues Palais, succeeding the artillery-damaged Royal Playhouse. The opening production was Iphigenia on Tauris by Johann Wolfgang Goethe. A new temporary venue was opened on 16 October 1949 with Goethe's Faust, Part One in the former restaurant, society house and concert garden "Zum alten Fritz" in Zimmerstraße, which now houses the Science and Restoration Centre of the Schlösserstiftung.

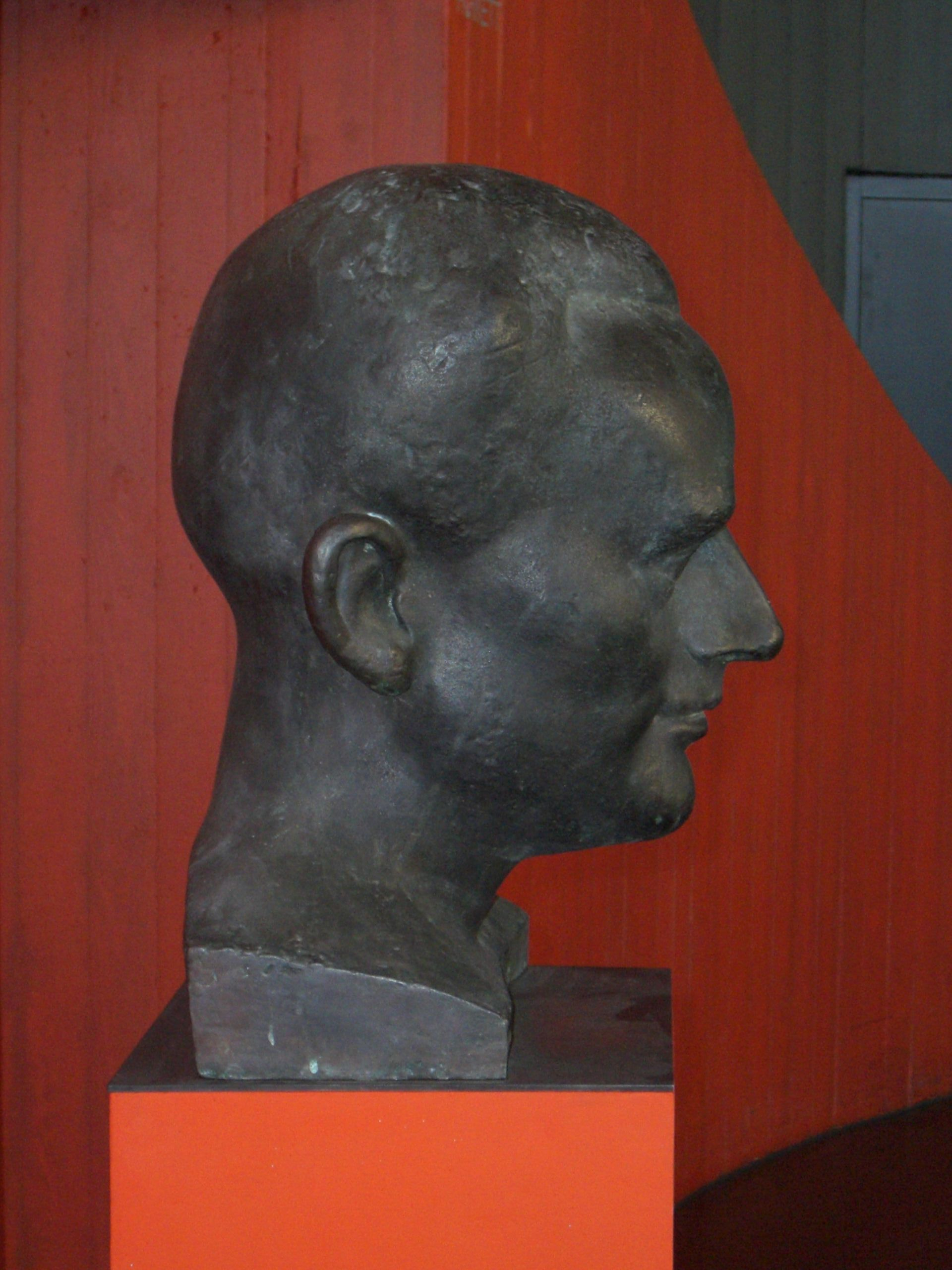
Hans Otto, portrayed by Peter Kern

In 1952, the theatre was named "Hans Otto Theatre" after the actor Hans Otto, who was arrested, tortured and murdered by the Nazis in November 1933 as a communist and trade unionist.

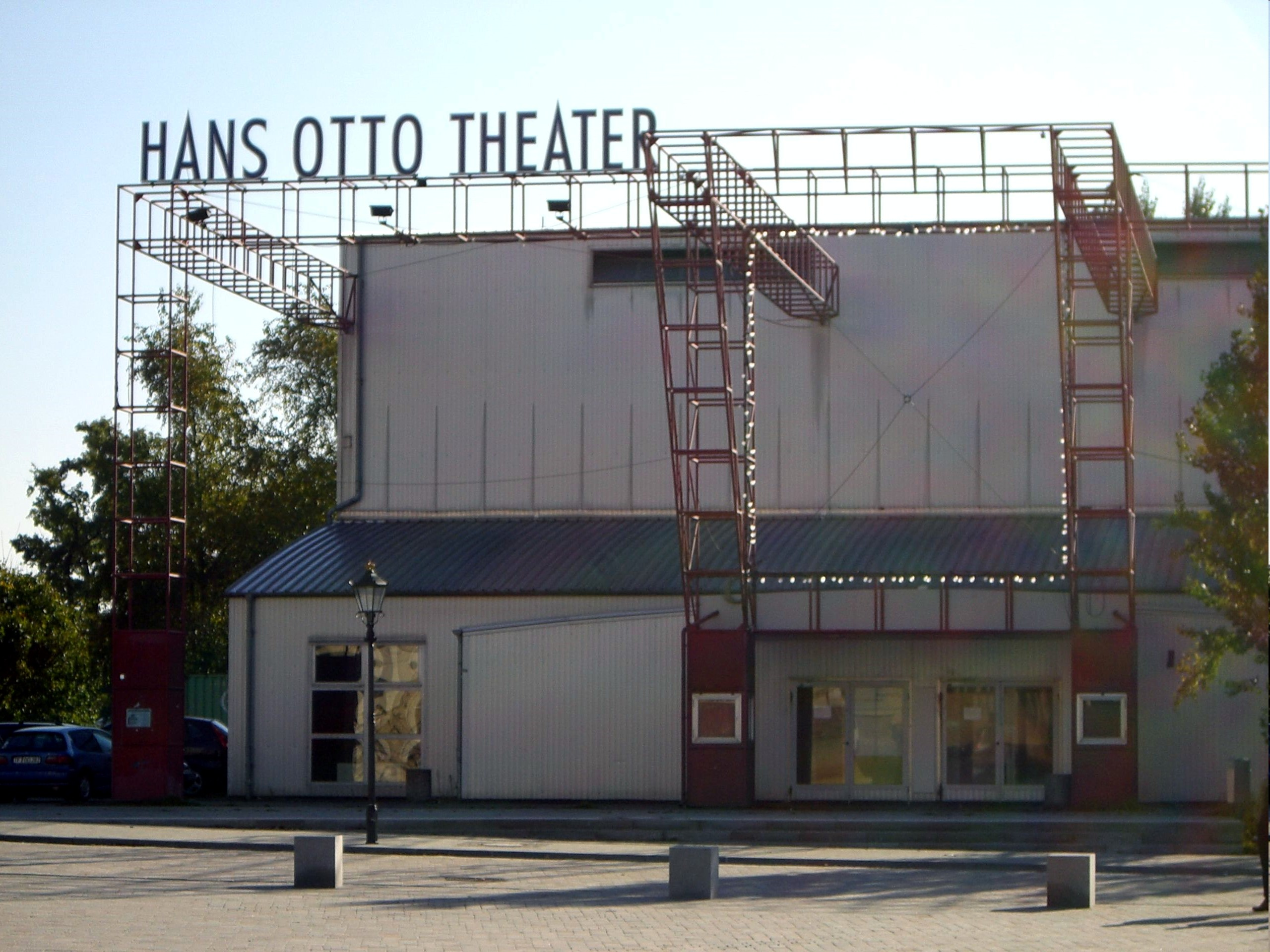
The "Tin Box" at the Alter Markt, venue of the Hans Otto Theater GmbH from 1992 to 2006

A reconstruction of Potsdam's city centre including a city hall and theatre decided in 1968 – the opening was planned for 1974 – was delayed. In 1985, another theatre building was planned; the building designed by Günter Franke, one of the architects of the Berlin TV Tower, was to be handed over in 1993 for Potsdam's 1000-year anniversary. The foundation stone was laid in 1989, before the fall of the Wall. However, the already completed shell at Art-Pro at Old Market Square was demolished in 1991 following a decision by the city council. In its place, the Landtag Brandenburg opened in January 2014 in historicised facades of the City Palace, Potsdam, which was damaged in World War II and demolished in 1960. The old venue in Zimmerstraße was closed at about the same time due to structural defects. Substitute venues were temporarily found in Schiffbauergasse and Heinrich-Mann-Allee. A temporary theatre building was erected at the Alter Markt, which was to serve as the central venue for five years and was soon nicknamed the "tin can" by the Potsdam public.

In 1998, a venue for children's and youth theatre was established on Schiffbauergasse (on Berliner Straße). In 1999, the decision was made to build the long-awaited new theatre building for the state capital of Potsdam on the newly developed cultural and commercial site Schiffbauergasse. In April 2003, the first sod was turned; in October 2003, the foundation stone was laid. To bridge the construction phase until the opening of the New Theatre, the then artistic director of the Hans-Otto-Theatre, Uwe Eric Laufenberg (2004-2009), invited his audience for two seasons under the motto "on the road" to various, sometimes exotic, alternative venues in the city. exotic alternative venues in the city, such as the Orangery Palace in Park Sanssouci, the pavilion on Freundschaftsinsel, the Palais Lichtenau or the Französische Kirche. Plays also continued in the "Blechbüchse" – it was the main venue of the Hans Otto Theater GmbH for fourteen years until its final closure in June 2006. On the weekend of 22 to 24 September 2006, two years after the topping-out ceremony in September 2004, the new building of the Hans Otto Theater GmbH, the New Theatre, was ceremoniously opened.

Brief summary of the history of the theatre since 1946:

- from 1946 "Landestheater der Mark Brandenburg" in the Neues Palais
- from 1947 "Brandenburg State Theatre
- from October 1949 in the former restaurant, society house and concert garden "Zum alten Fritz" in Zimmerstraße
- from October 1952 "Hans-Otto-Theatre
- 1953 connection of the touring theatre "Landesbühne Brandenburg" as a touring ensemble to the Hans-Otto-Theatre
- 1991 to 2006 in the provisional theatre building at the Old Market ("Blechbüchse")
- 1993 transformation of the "Hans-Otto-Theater" into "Hans Otto Theater GmbH" (and "Brandenburgische Philharmonie Potsdam GmbH"; dissolved in 2000)
- since September 2006 in the New Theatre on Schiffbauergasse
- since the 2018–2019 season the New Theatre is called Großes Haus

Artistic directors since 1946:

- Fritz Kirchhoff (1946–1947)
- Rochus Gliese (1947–1948)
- Alfred Dreifuß (1948 until 1950)
- Ilse Rodenberg (1951 until 1957)
- Gerhard Meyer (1957 until 1968)
- Peter Kupke (1968 until 1971)
- Gero Hammer (1971 until 1991)
- Guido Huonder (1991 until 1993)
- Stephan Märki (1993 until 1997)
- Ralf-Günter Krolkiewicz (1997 until 2004)
- Uwe Eric Laufenberg (2004 until 2009)
- Tobias Wellemeyer (2009 until 2018)
- Bettina Jahnke (since 2018)

== Theatre organisation ==
The Hans Otto Theatre is run in the legal form of a Gesellschaft mit beschränkter Haftung (GmbH).

=== Acting Ensemble ===
The theatre's ensemble consists of 25 committed actors. Since autumn 2018, under the artistic direction of Bettina Jahnke, more female directors have been working at the Hans Otto Theater, with the artistic direction placing great value on parity. Guest directors since then have been or are: Frank Abt, Jörg Bitterich, Marc Becker, Nicole Erbe, Kathrin Filler, Manuela Gerlach, Esther Hattenbach, Sascha Hawemann, Mario Holetzeck, Anna Franziska Huber, Bettina Jahnke, Jan Jochymski, Malte Kreuzfeldt, Steffi Kühnert, Konstanze Lauterbach Bernd Mottl, Ulrike Müller, Milena Paulovics, Nina de la Parra, Moritz Peters, Katrin Plötner, Mike Priebe, Annette Pullen, Tobias Johannes Erasmus Rott, Katharina Schmitt, Petra Schönwald, Caro Thum, Alexandra Wilke, Sebastian Wirnitzer, Angelika Zacek.

== Repertoire ==
The repertoire of the Hans-Otto-Theatre includes drama as well as theatre for children and young people. Together with the Kammerakademie Potsdam, the Hans Otto Theatre produces the annual new production of the Potsdam Winter Opera. Within the theatre and concert association of the state of Brandenburg, the Hans Otto Theatre presents its performances in the cities of Frankfurt (Oder) (Kleist Forum) and Brandenburg an der Havel (Brandenburg Theatre). Musical theatre productions from the Staatstheater Cottbus come to the Hans-Otto-Theater for guest performances.

== Venues ==
The main venues on Schiffbauergasse are the Großes Haus, a new stage building opened in 2006 with 485 seats, and the nearby Reithalle with 162 seats. In addition, there is the smaller stage Reithalle Box and the open-air summer stage at the Tiefen See.

=== Großes Haus ===
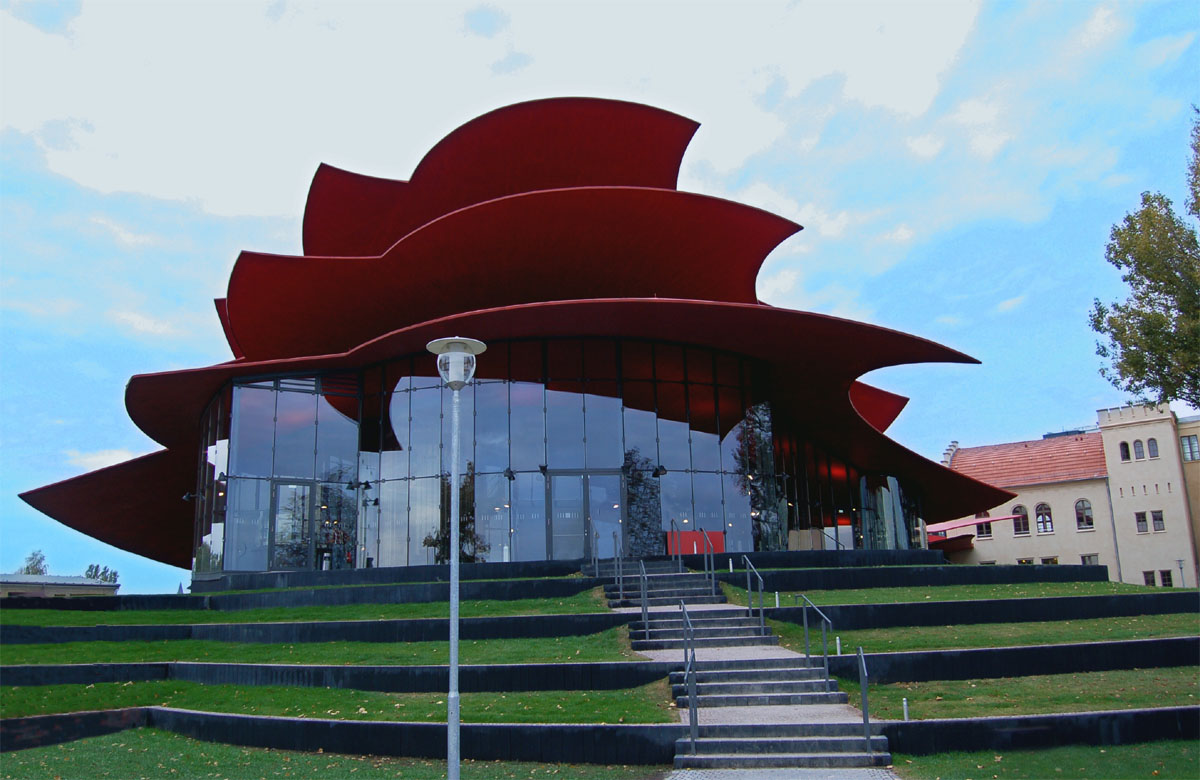
Großes Haus, main venue of Hans Otto Theater GmbH

The parent building and main venue of the Hans Otto Theatre was built from 2003 to 2006 on the cultural and commercial site Schiffbauergasse (house number 11). The clients of the 26.5 million euro project were the city of Potsdam and the Brandenburg State Development Corporation. The documentary film by Klaus Wunder Theater ohne Ende zum glücklichen Ende – Theaterbau in Potsdam shows the eventful struggle for a new theatre from 1988 to 2006.

==== Architecture ====
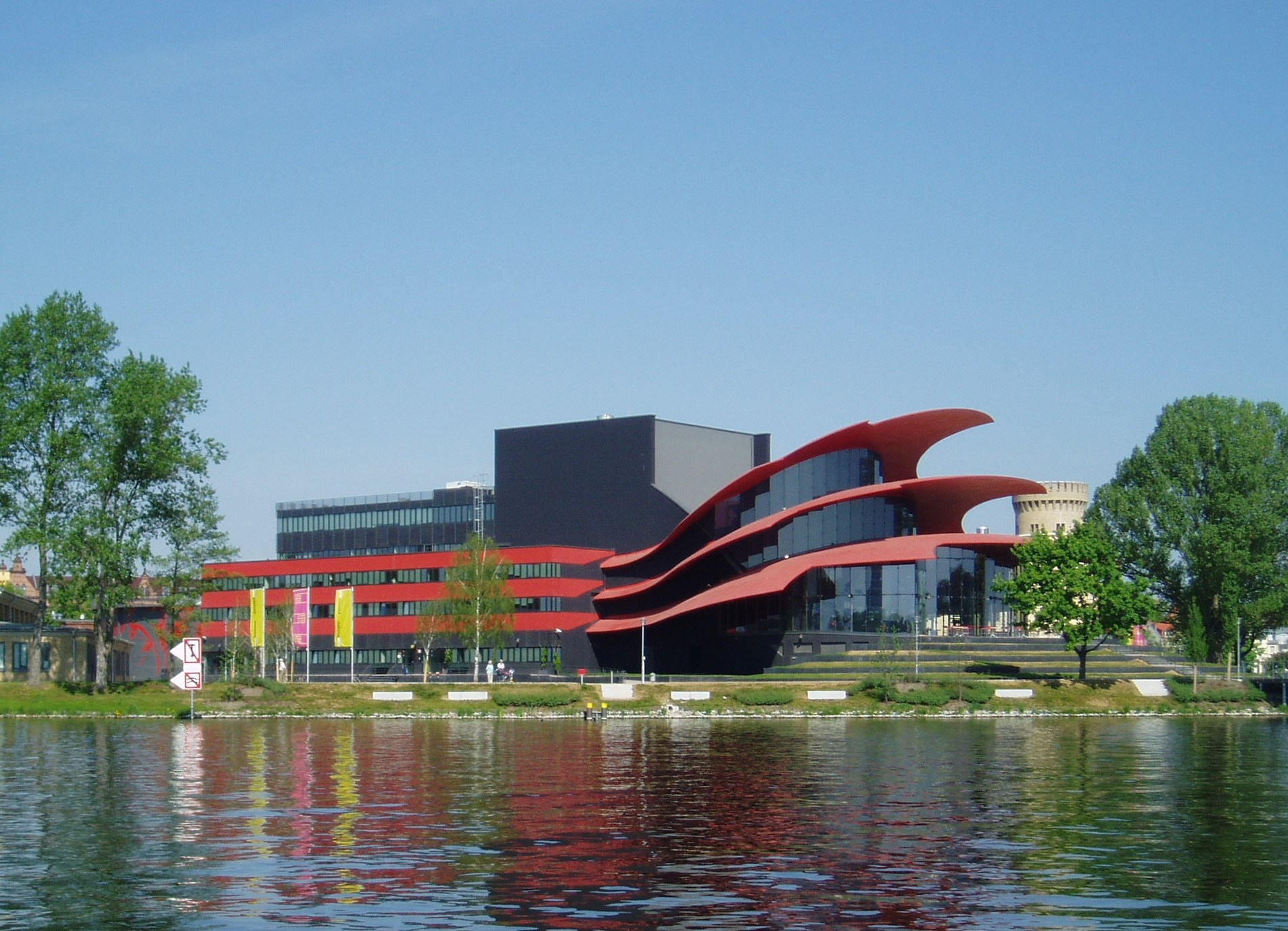
Haveluferansicht des Großes Hauses

The architect Paul Böhm, son of Gottfried Böhm, designed and realised together with his father a five-storey theatre building with shell-shaped, cantilevered roofs. Concrete, glass and steel are the predominant materials. A listed gas holder was integrated into the structure. On the Tiefen See side, a former chicory mill, also a listed building, adjoins the theatre structure; it now houses a restaurant.

The upper foyer and stage hall have glass window fronts that look out over the Havel River to Park Babelsberg. The hall can be completely darkened for evening theatre performances. The hall has room for a maximum of 485 spectators. There are 50 lifting platforms under the rows of spectators, with which the auditorium can be flexibly lowered and raised. The backstage can be opened to the rounded interior of the Gasometer. An orchestra pit also makes the stage suitable for musical theatre performances.

The new Hans Otto Theatre was officially opened on 22 September 2006. At a ceremony attended by Federal President Horst Köhler and Brandenburg's Prime Minister Matthias Platzeck, the cultural and economic importance of the new theatre location for the city of Potsdam was acknowledged and reference was made to the hoped-for signal effect for the new federal states. The opening received widespread media coverage throughout Germany. On the weekend of 22 to 24 September, five premieres were on the programme, including two world premieres, a German-language premiere and Lessing's Nathan the Wise. In the 2015 film documentary Die Böhms - Architektur einer Familie by Maurizius Staerkle-Drux, the new building of the New Theatre occupies an important place.

=== Reithalle ===
The Reithalle is located at Potsdamer Schiffbauergasse 16, a two-minute walk from the Main House.

In the Reithalle A mainly productions of children's and youth theatre are performed. The Reithalle B is especially used for theatre rehearsals.

=== Palace Theatre in the New Palace ===
The Palace Theatre is located directly in the New Palace at Am Neuen Palais 1 on the western edge of Park Sanssouci.

== Awards ==
- 2008: Friedrich Luft Prize for the world premiere production of Staats-Sicherheiten under the direction of Clemens Bechtel
