= Andreas Schager =

Austrian operatic tenor

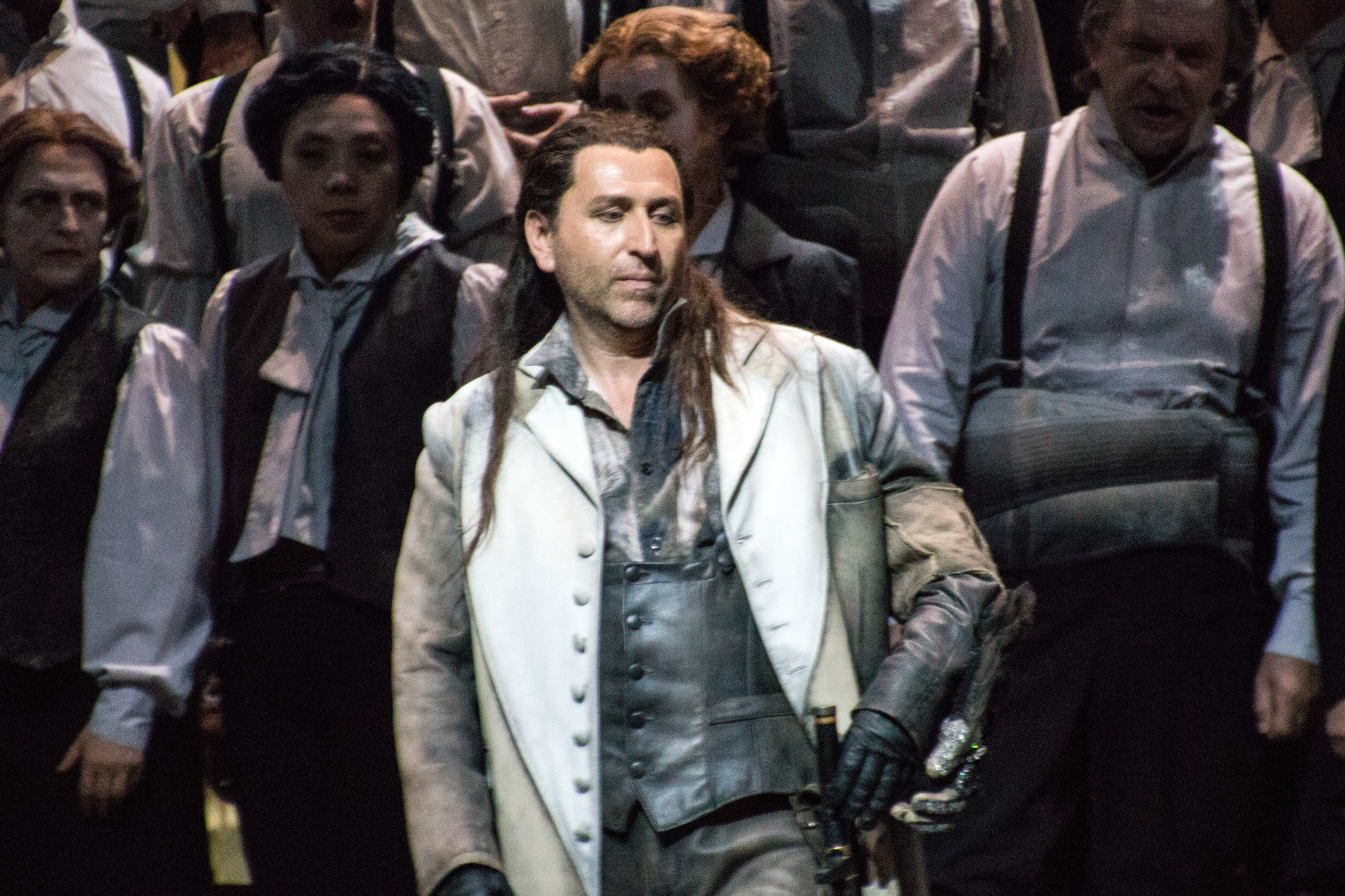
- The tenor as Siegfried in a 2016 production of Götterdämmerung at the Staatsoper Berlin
- Born: Rohrbach an der Gölsen
- Education: University of Music and Performing Arts Vienna
- Occupation: Operatic tenor
- Organizations: Staatsoper Berlin
- Website: www.andreas-schager.info

Andreas Schager is an Austrian operatic tenor. He began his career as a tenor for operettas, but has developed into singing Heldentenor parts by Richard Wagner including Tristan, Siegmund, Siegfried and Parsifal. A member of the Staatsoper Berlin, he has appeared internationally at venues including La Scala, The Proms and the Bayreuth Festival.

== Career ==
He was born Andreas Schagerl in Rohrbach an der Gölsen, Lower Austria. He was a singer of the Wiener Singakademie, and then studied voice at the University of Music and Performing Arts Vienna with Walter Moore. He made his debut on stage as Ferrando in Mozart's Così fan tutte at the Schlosstheater Schönbrunn. His first engagement was as an operetta tenor at the Theater Krefeld und Mönchengladbach.

Schager sang lyrical tenor parts as a guest in Bologna, at the Oper Frankfurt, in Ghent and in Vienna, and at the Canadian Opera Company, including Tamino in Mozart's Die Zauberflöte. He had developed into a singer of major Wagner roles by 2009, when he performed the role of David in Die Meistersinger von Nürnberg, also Florestan in Beethoven's Fidelio and Max in Weber's Der Freischütz. He appeared in the title role of Wagner's Rienzi first in June 2011 at the Theater Meiningen, and as Siegfried at the Halle Opera in the 2011/12 season. He performed the roles of Tannhäuser, both Siegmund and Siegfried in Der Ring des Nibelungen, and Parsifal. He appeared as Tristan first at the Stadttheater Minden in 2012, alongside Dara Hobbs as Isolde, with the Nordwestdeutsche Philharmonie conducted by Frank Beermann directed by Matthias von Stegmann. A reviewer from Vienna called his performance a "sensation"; She described him as looking and acting like a knight, and his voice as unbelievably powerful, used without straining it, but also without restraint during the three acts ("eine unwahrscheinlich kraftvolle Stimme, die unforciert drei Akte lang ohne Schonung eingesetzt wird"). She thought that his high range, built upon a basis of a broad middle range, seemed to be able to move mountains ("Auf einer breiten Mittellage-Basis baut er Höhen auf, die Berge versetzen könnten, meint man.). The performance was noticed internationally; reviewers noted the singers' intensity and authenticity, and described Schager's Tristan as a "boisterous, passionate firebrand and dare-devil, whose ego does not have space for self-doubt.

At a performance of Siegfried at the Staatsoper Berlin conducted by Daniel Barenboim on 7 April 2013, Lance Ryan was scheduled to sing the role of Siegfried but failed to show up for Act I beginning in the afternoon. Schager, scheduled to sing Siegfried in Götterdämmerung, was nearby rehearsing Die Zauberflöte with the Berlin Philharmonic for a performance the same evening, and he agreed to Barenboim's request to sing the role of Siegfried from the wings while an assistant director appeared on stage in Ryan's costume. Ryan arrived in time for Act II. Schager appeared then as Siegfried in Götterdämmerung, at the Staatsoper and also at The Proms and La Scala.

Schager made his debut at the Bayreuth Festival in 2016 as Erik in Der fliegende Holländer, and stepped in as Parsifal, a role he went on to sing in 2017, 2018, 2019, 2023, 2024, and 2025. He appeared as Siegfried in a concert performance at the 2016 Spring Festival in Tokyo, conducted by Marek Janowski. He performed in the two performances of the Ring cycle of the Internationale Maifestspiele Wiesbaden, staged by Uwe Eric Laufenberg, as Siegfried, and on short notice also as Siegmund. A critic said she had rarely met a tenor that wild, untamed, freely flowing, blasting every high note with joy ("... einen so wilden, ungezähmten, sich verströmenden, jeden hohen Ton mit Freude schmetternden Tenor selten gehört". She described him as a truly intelligent actor who is capable of great nuances ("... und daneben ein wirklich intelligenter Darsteller, der zu großartigen Nuancierungen fähig ist"). Schager made his Metropolitan Opera debut as Siegfried in 2019. Anthony Tommasini, a music critic at The New York Times, wrote: "Mr. Schager pretty much met expectations, which is saying a lot given the paucity of tenors who can sing Siegfried. He has a hefty voice with clarion top notes and energy galore."

In concert, Schager sang in Mahler's Eighth Symphony in Lucerne, conducted by Riccardo Chailly, and in Schönberg's Gurre-Lieder at the Philharmonie de Paris, conducted by Philippe Jordan. He was the tenor soloist in Mahler's Das Lied von der Erde at the Südtiroler Festspiele in Toblach and in Hamburg with choir and orchestra of the NDR, and in Beethoven's Ninth Symphony in Bolzano and Ravenna.

In 2025, Schager was named Österreichischer Kammersänger.
