= Dara Hobbs =

American operatic soprano

- Born: Dara Kristin Hobbs; Williams Bay, Wisconsin
- Education: Northwestern University
- Occupation: Dramatic soprano
- Organizations: Theater Krefeld und Mönchengladbach
- Website: www.darahobbs.com

Dara Kristin Hobbs is an American operatic soprano, who has appeared internationally, mostly in European opera houses. Her repertoire has focused on dramatic soprano roles, such as Wagner's Isolde and Strauss' Ariadne. She appeared as Wagner's Brünnhilde in Der Ring in Minden.

== Career ==
Born in Williams Bay, Wisconsin, Hobbs studied at Northwestern University, graduating with a Bachelor of Arts in European history and Master of Music. She studied on a scholarship from the American Institute of Musical Studies in Graz in summer 2005, and at the Vocal Arts Symposium in Spoleto, Italy, in summer 2006.

She was a member of the Theater Krefeld und Mönchengladbach from 2007 to 2012, where she performed title roles such as Verdi's Aida, Puccini's Tosca and Suor Angelica, and Ariadne auf Naxos by Richard Strauss. Other major parts included the Countess in Mozart's Il nozze, Lisa in Tchaikovsky's Pique Dame, and Elisabeth in Verdi's Don Carlos. From 2012, she has worked as a freelance singer.

Hobbs has appeared at the Bayreuth Festival from 2013 as Ortlinde in Die Walküre. She performed at opera houses in Europe and the US, often in roles by Richard Strauss and Richard Wagner. She performed Ariadne at the Leipzig Opera, the Staatsoper Hannover and the Fundação Calouste Gulbenkian in Lisbon. She appeared as Senta in Der fliegende Holländer at the Sarasota Opera in Florida, as Sieglinde in Die Walküre at the Oper Frankfurt, and as Isolde in Tristan und Isolde at Theater Bonn, Theater Chemnitz, Theater Regensburg, Stadttheater Minden, Theater Gera and at Schloss Neuschwanstein.

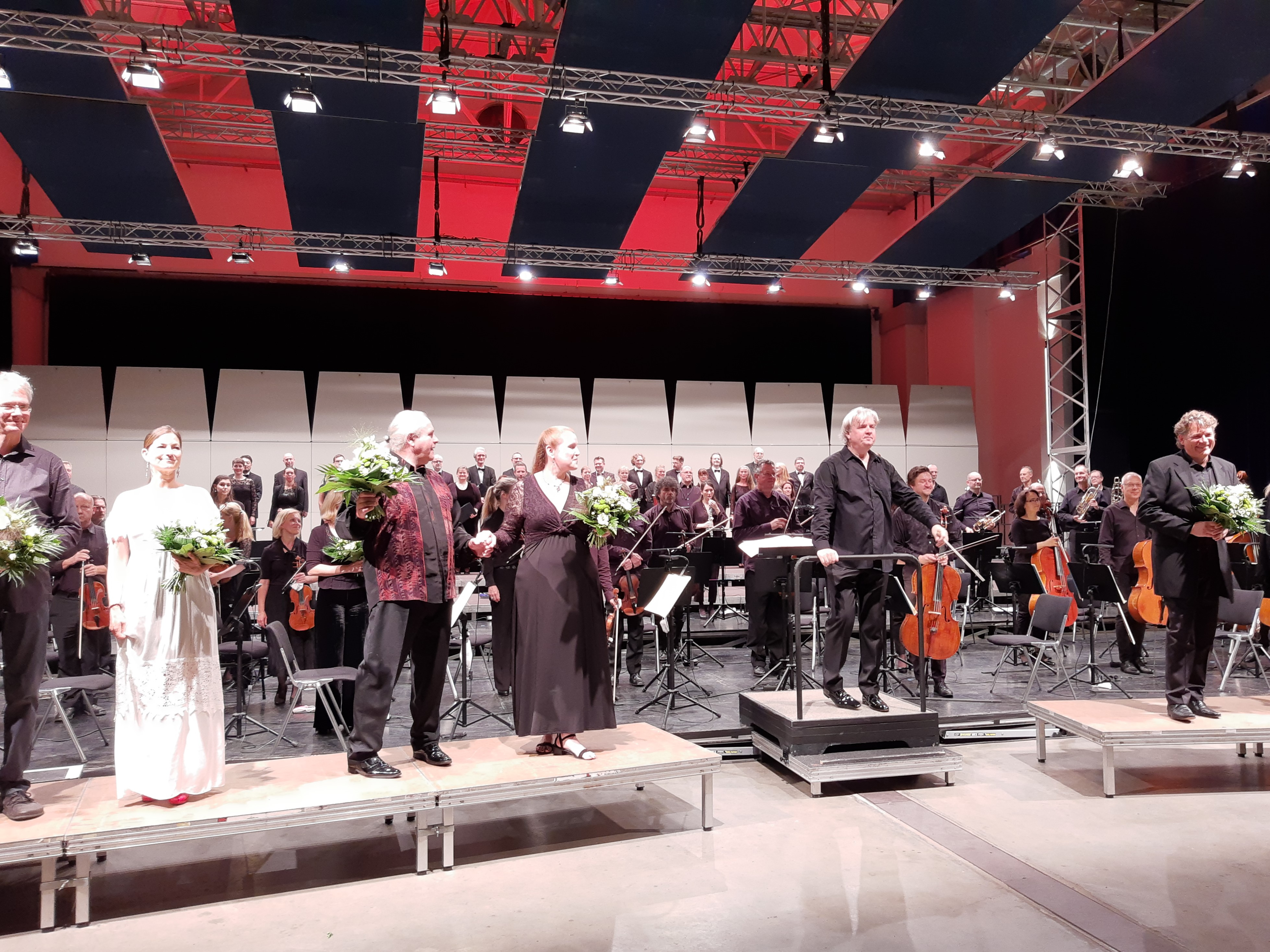
As Leonore, in black dress, after a concert performance of Fidelio, 2021

The performance in Minden, staged by Matthias von Stegmann and played by the Nordwestdeutsche Philharmonie conducted by Frank Beermann, with Andreas Schager as Tristan, received international recognition. A reviewer from Vienna called her performance sensational and described in detail her voice as well-trained, clear, full, and at the same time mellow and with metal luster in high range ("bestens durchgebildete, klare, große Stimme, zugleich weich, warm, voll und mit Metallklang in den Höhen, wo gefordert"), a voice to express the dramatic situations. She appeared as Brünnhilde in Der Ring in Minden from 2016 to 2019. On July 10, 2021, she appeared in the title role of Beethoven's Fidelio in a concert performance at the Alfred Fischer Hall in Hamm as part of the KlassikSommer Hamm festival. Beermann conducted the Nordwestdeutsche Philharmonie, choir and soloists. In 2022, she sang Brünnhilde (Die Walküre, Siegfried, Götterdämmerung) with Nationaltheater Mannheim in South Korea.
