= Old Market Square, Potsdam =

Square in Potsdam, Germany

Coordinates: 52°23′45″N 13°3′40″E

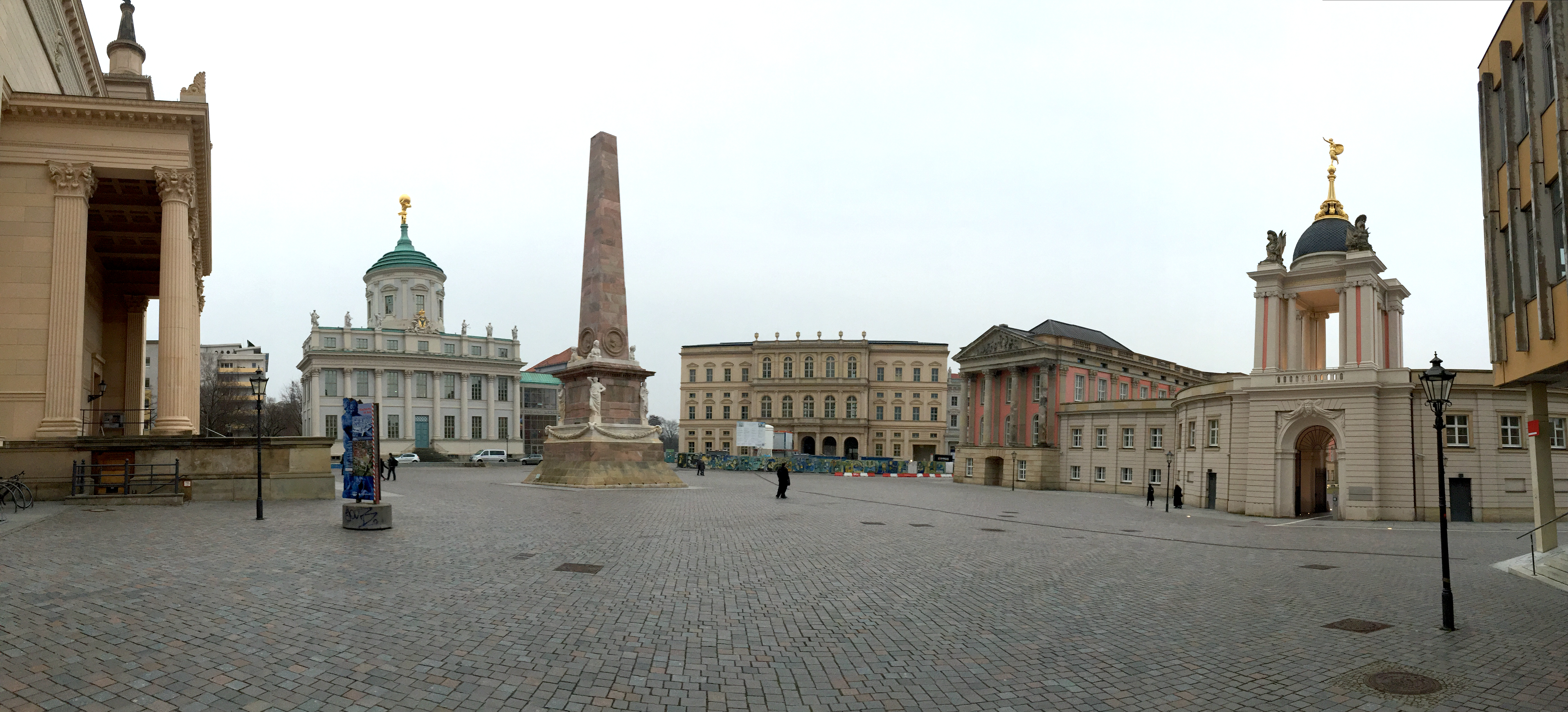
Old Market Square (March 2016)

The Old Market Square (German: Alter Markt) is a centrally located square in downtown Potsdam which forms the historical centre of the city. The square consists of the area around St. Nicholas' Church. Today the term refers in particular to the area directly in front of the church. It is bordered by several prestigious historical buildings. The square has been the site of much architectural reconstruction work in recent years which has restored much historic building fabric that was lost in World War II.

== History ==
The City Palace was originally erected in 1666 under the order of Elector Frederick William. At the time the spot was part of a castle grounds. The Old City Hall was developed between 1753 and 1755 under the direction of architects Jan Bouman and Carl Ludwig Hildebrant. The marble obelisk in front of the church was added in 1753, following a design by Georg Wenzeslaus von Knobelsdorff, in order to emphasise the Roman character of the square. The most famous building in the square, St. Nicholas' Church, was erected from 1830 to 1837 as a centrally planned building after classical-style designs by Karl Friedrich Schinkel.

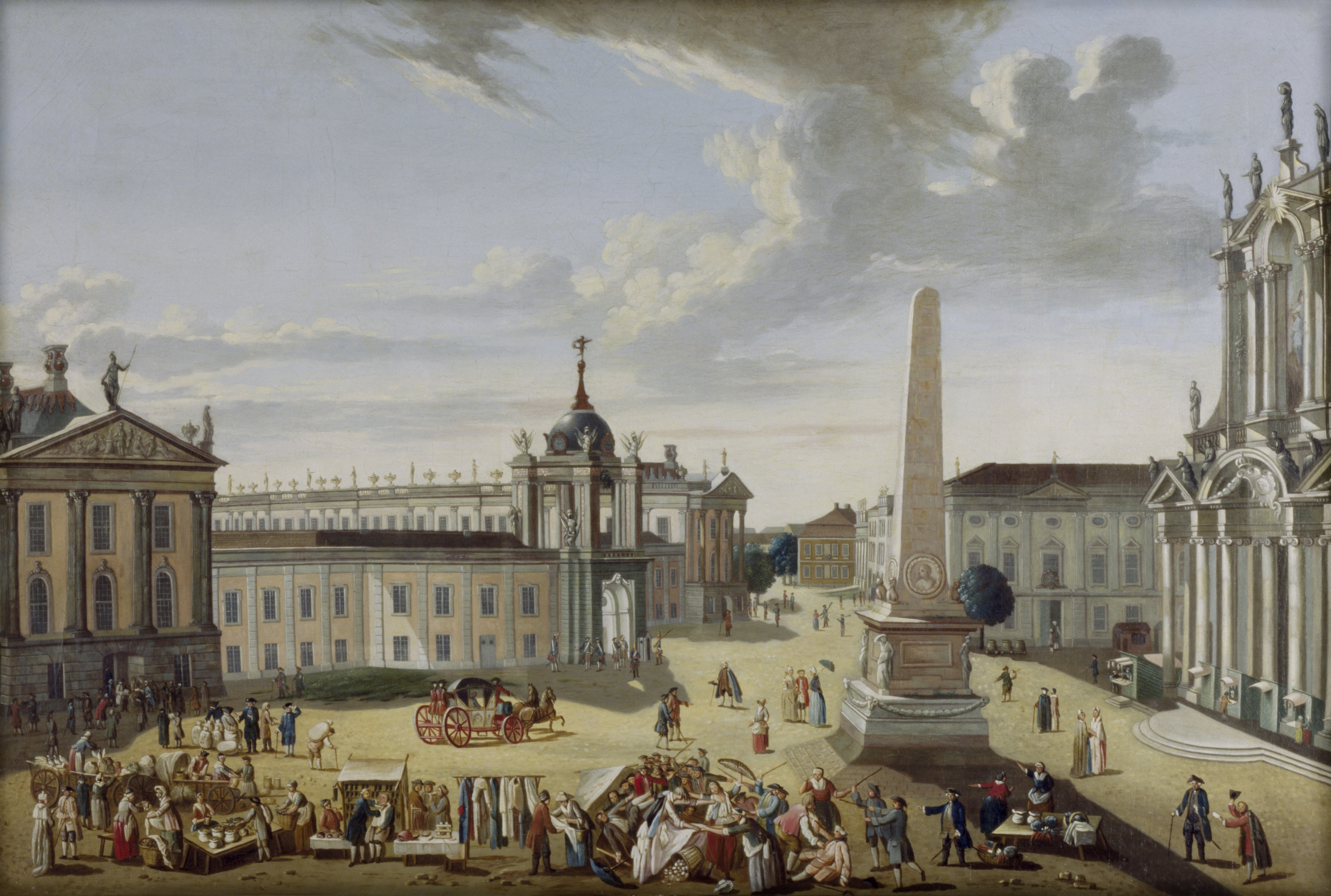
Carl Christian Wilhelm Baron — Alter Markt in Potsdam (1772)

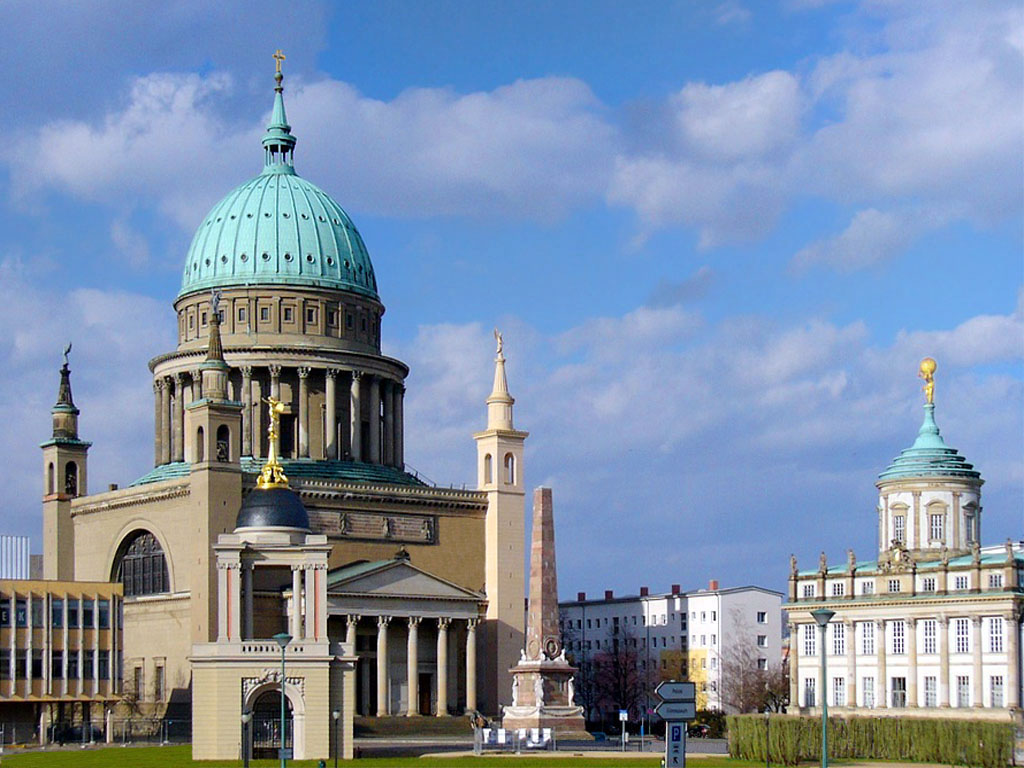
Old Market Square (2005, before the reconstruction of the City Palace)

The buildings in the square were largely destroyed by World War II air raids by the Royal Air Force in April 1945. St. Nicholas' Church and the Old City Hall were immediately rebuilt after 1945, and the marble obelisk was restored in 1979. The shaft of the obelisk originally depicted rulers of the House of Hohenzollern who had heavily influenced Potsdam: Frederick William, Elector of Brandenburg, as well as the kings Frederick I, Frederick William I, and Frederick the Great. Upon restoration the references to the old rulers were removed and replaced by portraits of popular Potsdam architects Georg Wenzeslaus von Knobelsdorff, Carl von Gontard, Karl Friedrich Schinkel, and Friedrich Ludwig Persius. Other war ruins were demolished and removed, including those of the City Palace and Barberini Palace. The square was thus left open on the south side. Between 1971 and 1977, a modern-style building for the Fachhochschule Potsdam was added to the west side of the square. Shortly before the fall of the Berlin Wall, new construction of a theatre began in the former location of the City Palace. Its skeleton was torn down several years after the local government decided to bring new construction in line with the historical style. A new location for the theatre (today the Hans Otto Theater) was selected on the shore of the Tiefer See in the city. In 2007 incremental reconstruction of the entire square was resumed.

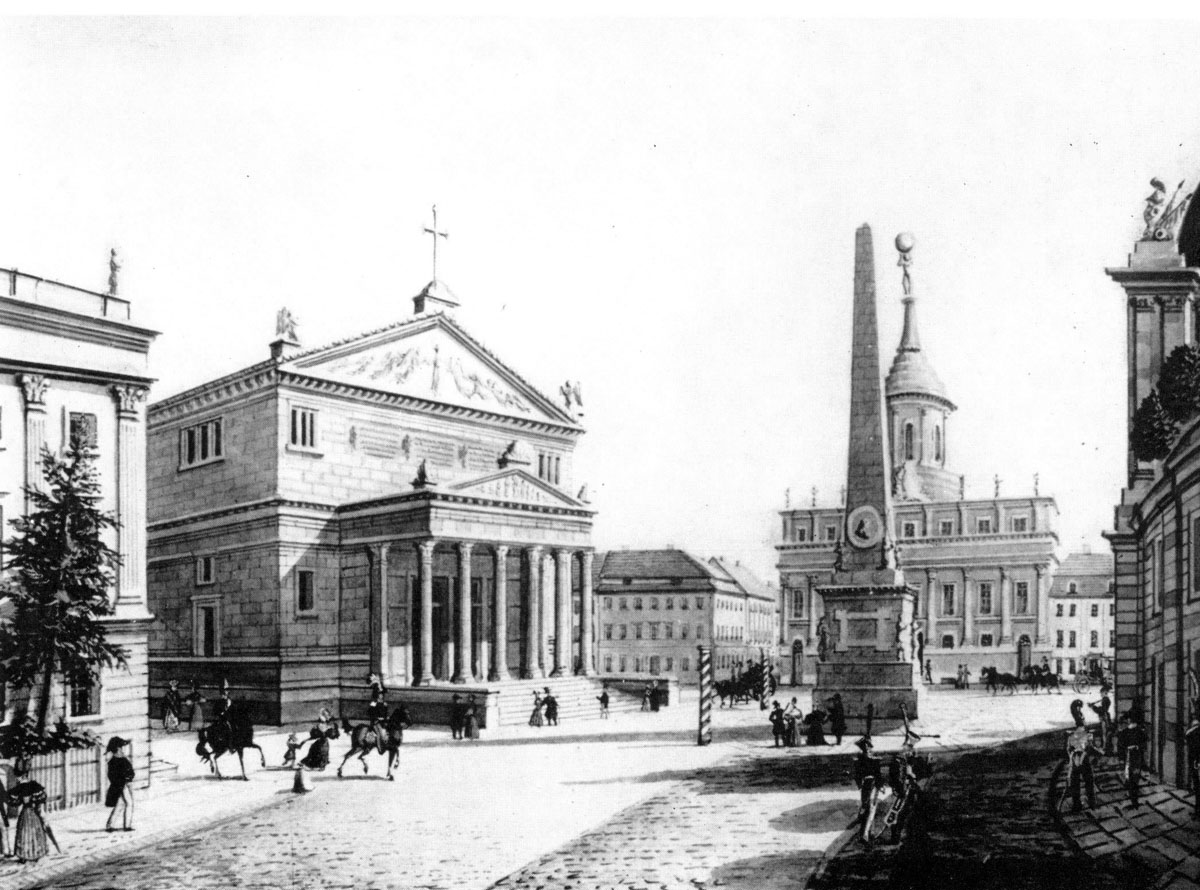
1837: View from the south (St. Nicholas' Church does not yet have its dome)

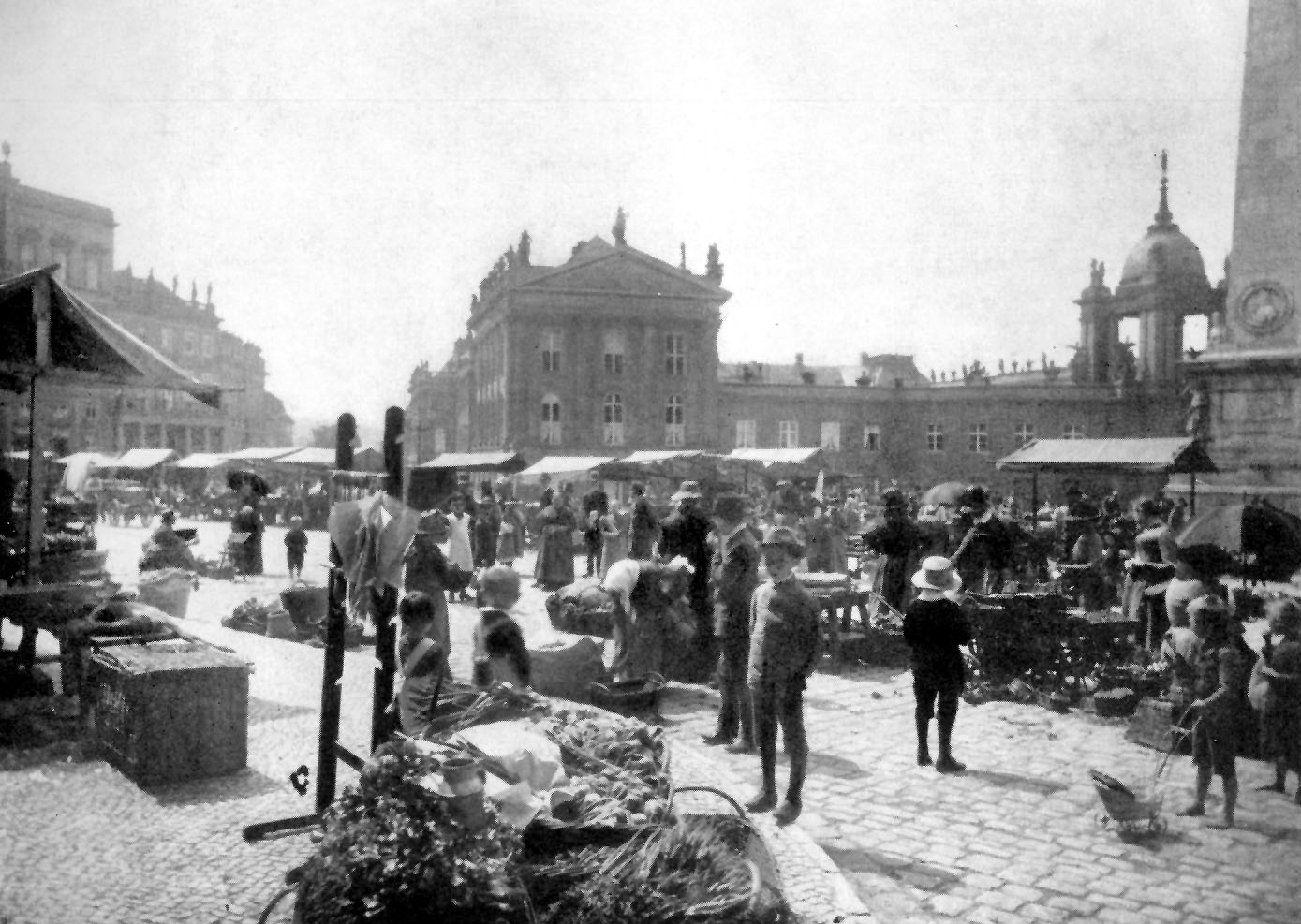
1900: From the northeast

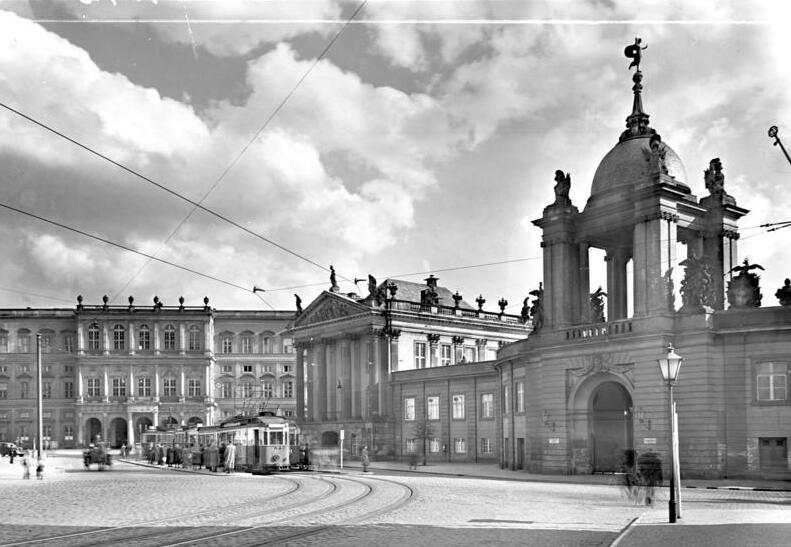
1928: View of the City Palace and Barberini Palace

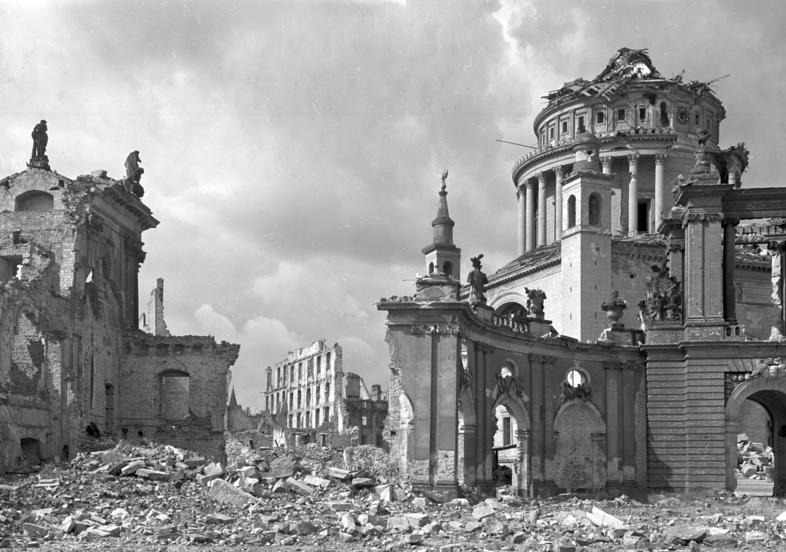
Destruction after 1945 Royal Air Force raids of World War II

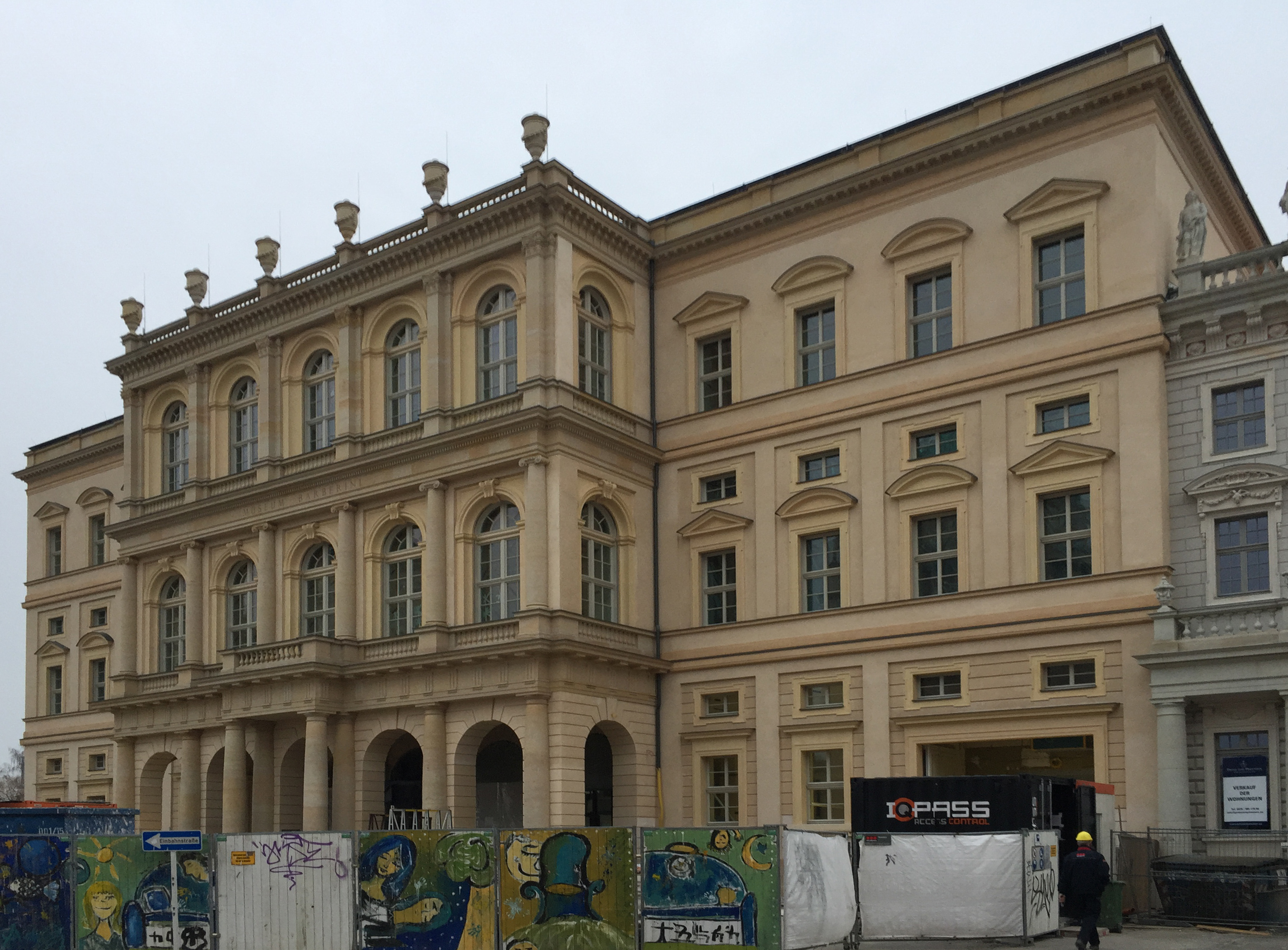
2016: Museum Barberini just before opening.

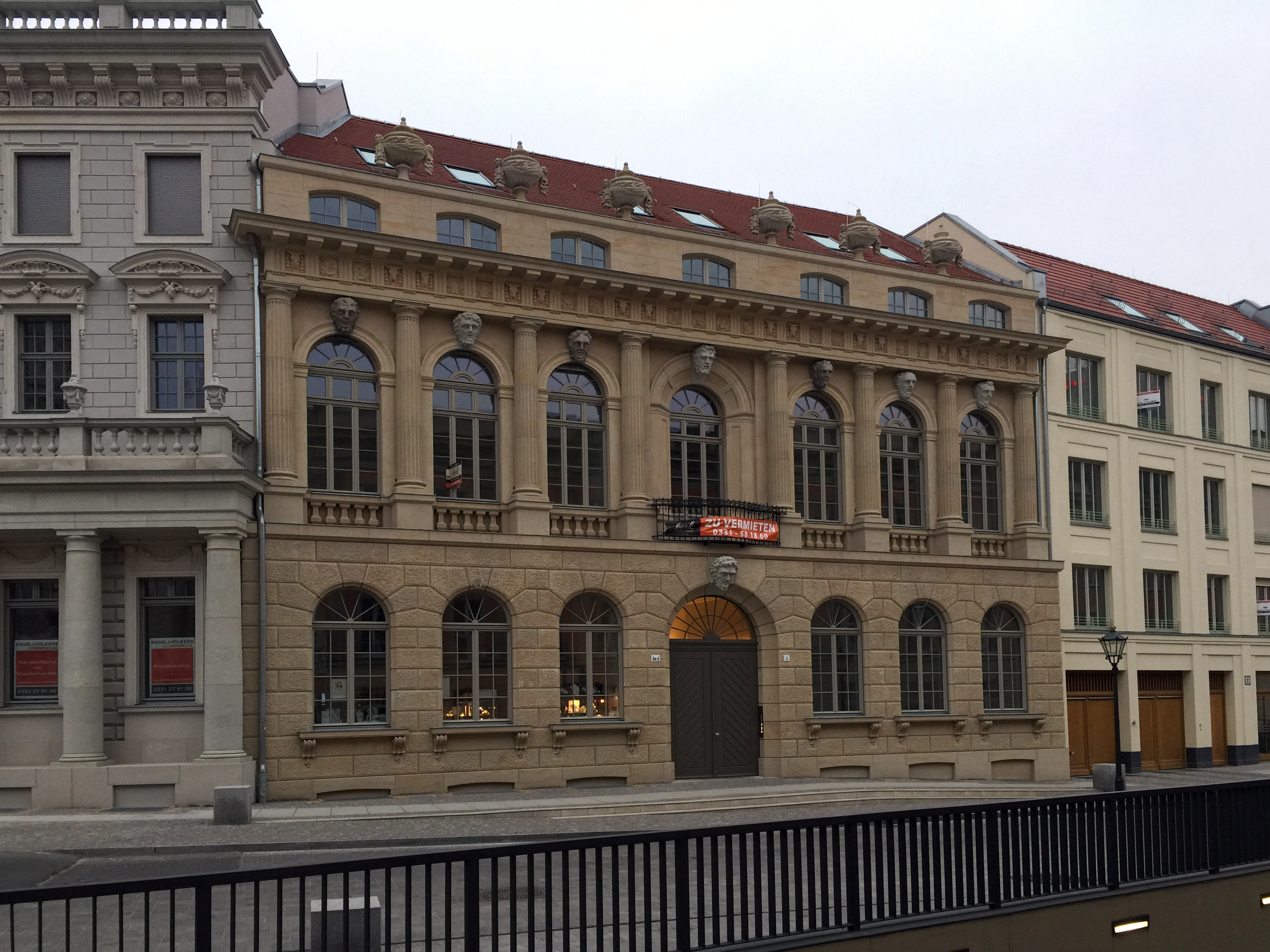
2016: Pompei Palace

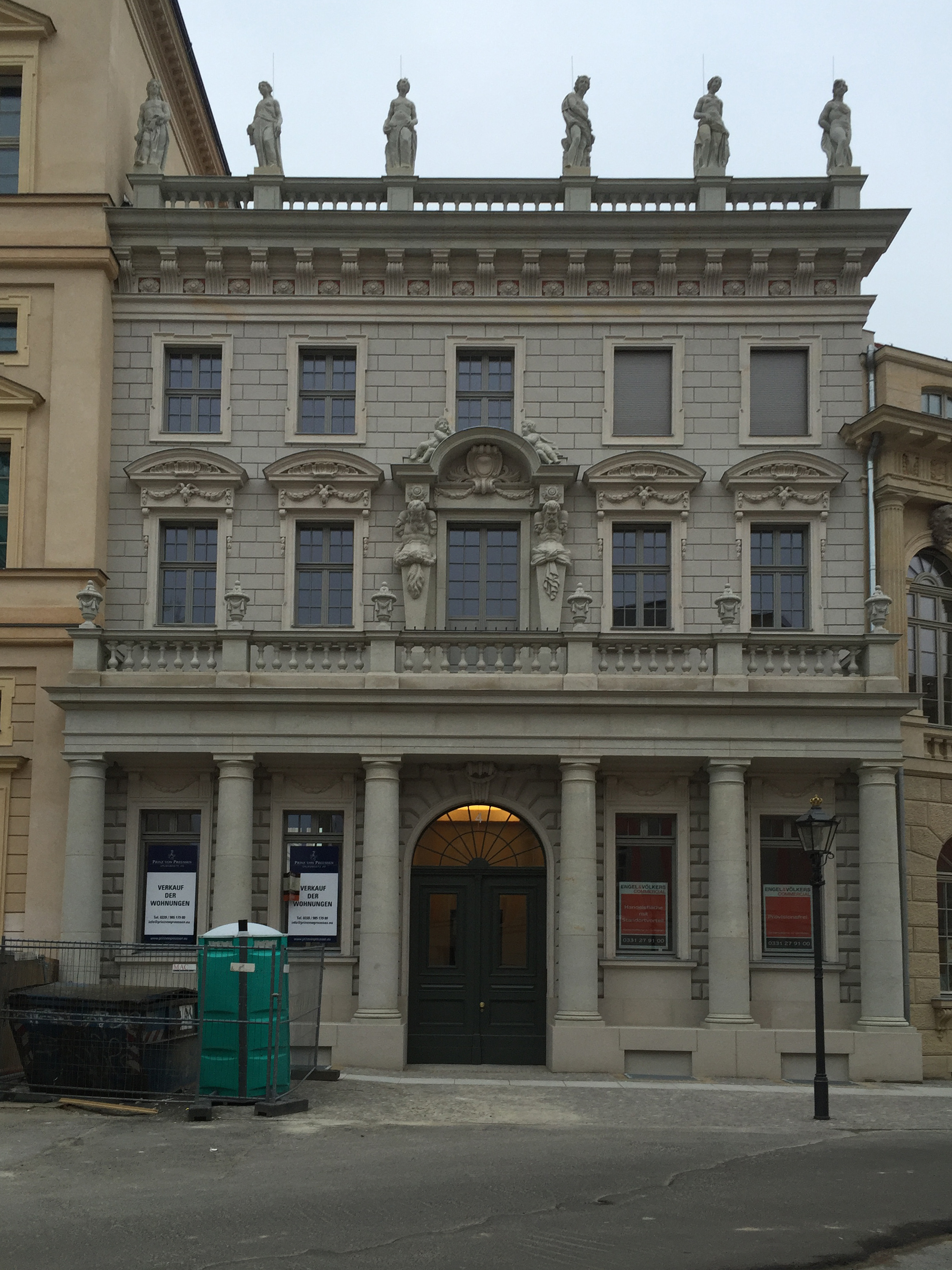
2016: Noacksche Haus

The Potsdam capital aimed for a complete restoration of the square in its original form, along with the bordering historical area, in around 2025. The following points have been implemented, in the quest for a revived Potsdamer Mitte (downtown):

- The construction of the Landtag of Brandenburg, whose exterior and courtyard match those of the destroyed City Palace. The elaborate Gate of Fortune (Fortunaportal) on the market-side entrance was rebuilt in 2002 after a donation by the journalist Günther Jauch. The construction exactly matches its original Attic style.
- On the south side of the square is the Pompei Palace, a replica of the Verona palace of the same name. This copy of a Renaissance-nobility palace was built by Carl Ludwig Hildebrant in 1754. Original mascarons from the first buildings of Potsdam have been inserted into the façade of the building.
- Also to the south lies the Museum Barberini, a copy of the previous building, the Barberini Palace. The museum was funded by the German billionaire Hasso Plattner. The former Baroque building was built by Carl von Gontard in 1771–1772, inspired by the Roman-style Renaissance palace Palazzo Barberini. The newly built museum opened in spring 2017.
- Both palace replicas are linked by the narrow Noacksche Haus, designed by Carl von Gontard in 1777 in Palladian style. While the building is sometimes alleged to be related to the Palazzo Chiericati in Vicenza, this is unverifiable and might have been the building contractors raising the value of the condominiums within.
- To the east is the Old City Hall, a copy of a façade planned (but never constructed) by Andrea Palladio for the Count of Angarano in Vicenza. It was erected by Jan Bouman in 1755. Today the building hosts the Potsdam Museum, which also extends into the neighboring buildings: the so-called Windelbandsche and Lehmannsche Haus (often known since the time of the DDR as Knobelsdorffhaus, even though Georg Wenzeslaus von Knobelsdorff never lived there).
- On the west side was a building erected in 1970 by the East German government as a local teacher training college. Until its demolition it housed two departments of the Fachhochschule Potsdam. The façades of the individual modules of the building (a reinforced concrete construction) had certain formal (but not material) similarities to the façades of a bank building erected by Ludwig Mies van der Rohe in Des Moines, Iowa (Home Federal Savings and Loan Association, 1959–1962). Nevertheless, the Potsdam architects did not see the building or Mies himself as their model. A parallel to Mies, however, results from their claim to refer to classicism with vertical pilasters. The building was torn down in 2018, as a result of a decision by the local Potsdam government. It will be replaced with about 50 new housing units.

== Buildings ==
The square is surrounded by the following buildings and facilities:

- The evangelical St. Nicholas' Church, a classical building designed by Karl Friedrich Schinkel
- The City Palace, reconstructed in 2013
- The marble obelisk in the middle of the square, redeveloped in 2014
- The Potsdam Museum, inside both the Old City Hall building (topped by a golden statue of Atlas) and the Knobelsdorffhaus
- The Humboldt Quartier, reconstructed in 2015

The original main building of the Fachhochschule Potsdam was demolished in 2018

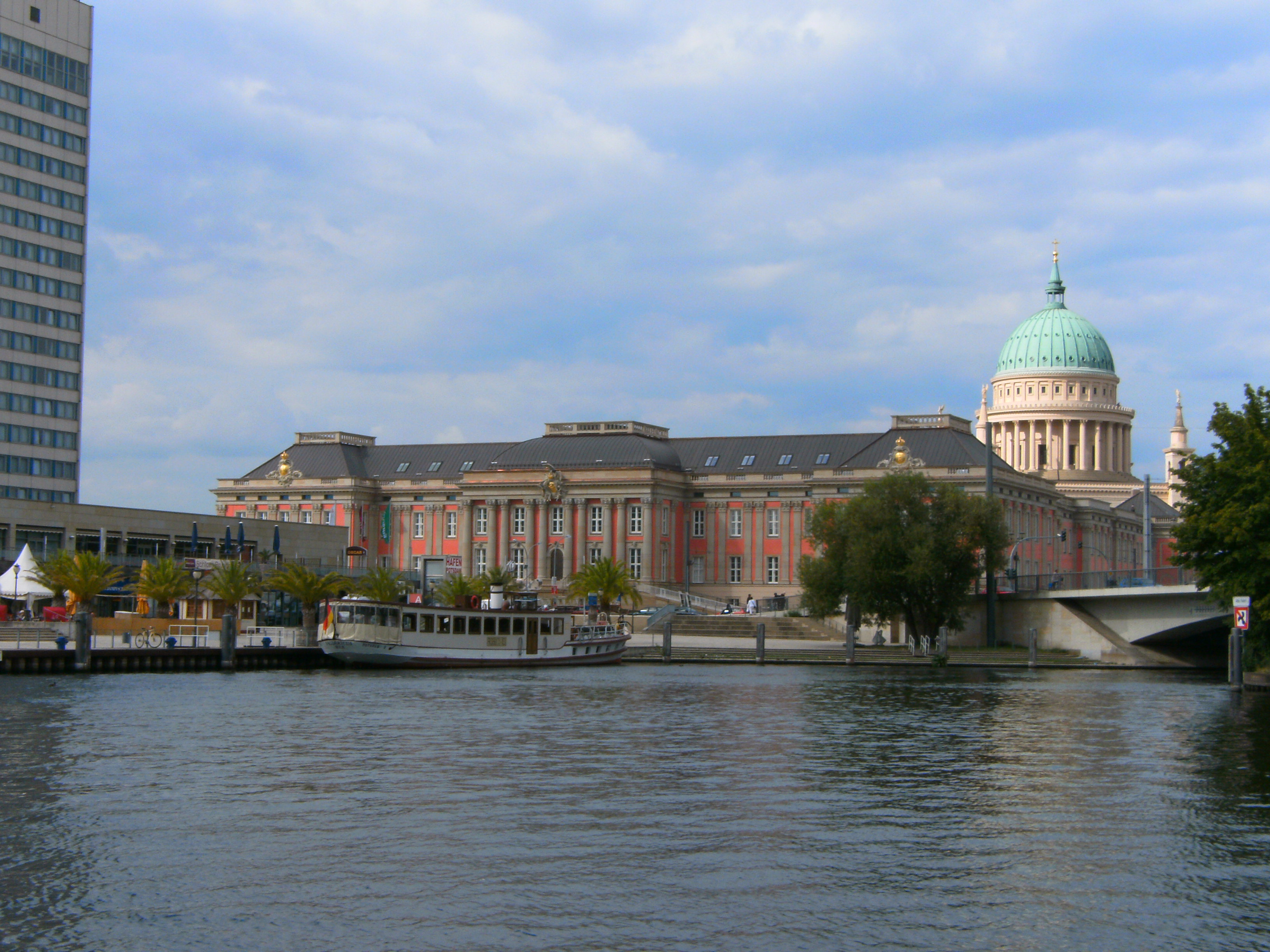
Potsdam City Palace, seat of the Landtag of Brandenburg

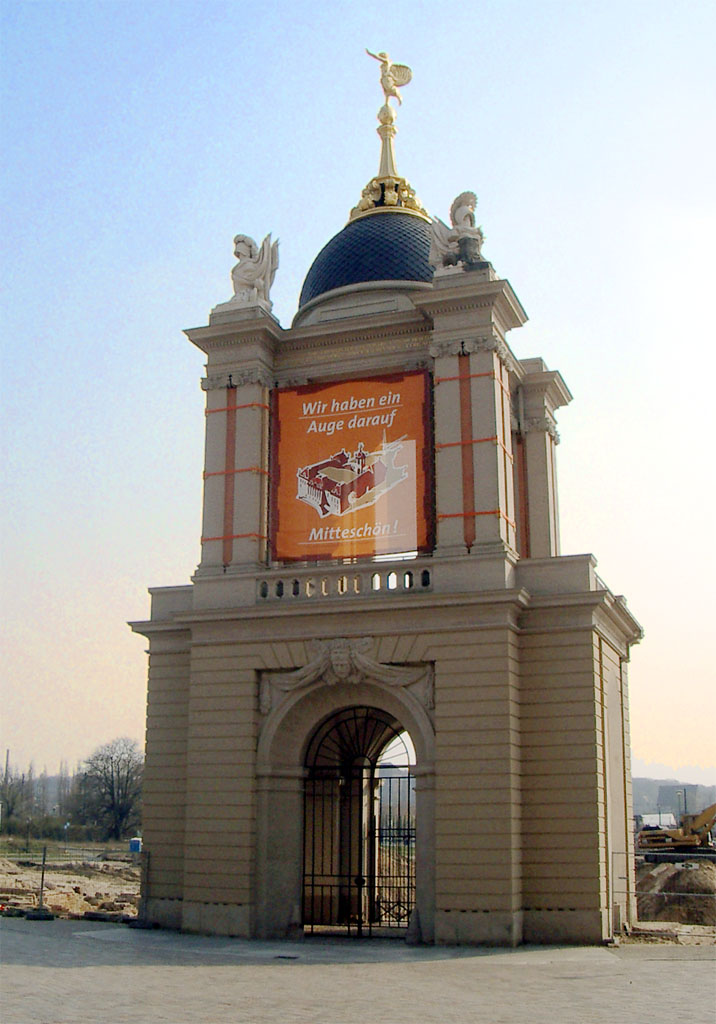
The Gate of Fortune in 2007, before the rebuilding of the City Palace

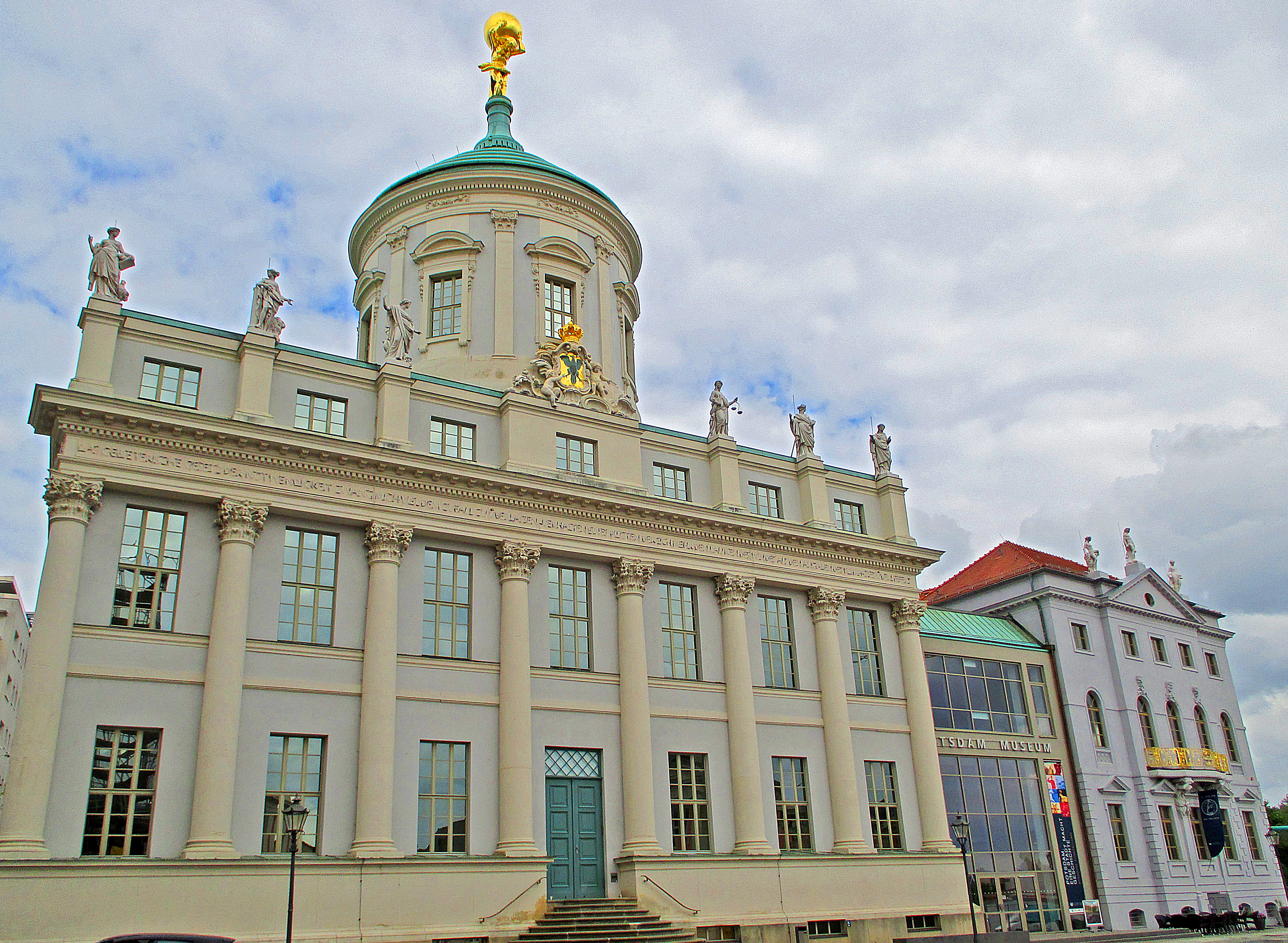
Old City Hall and Knobelsdorffhaus (on right)

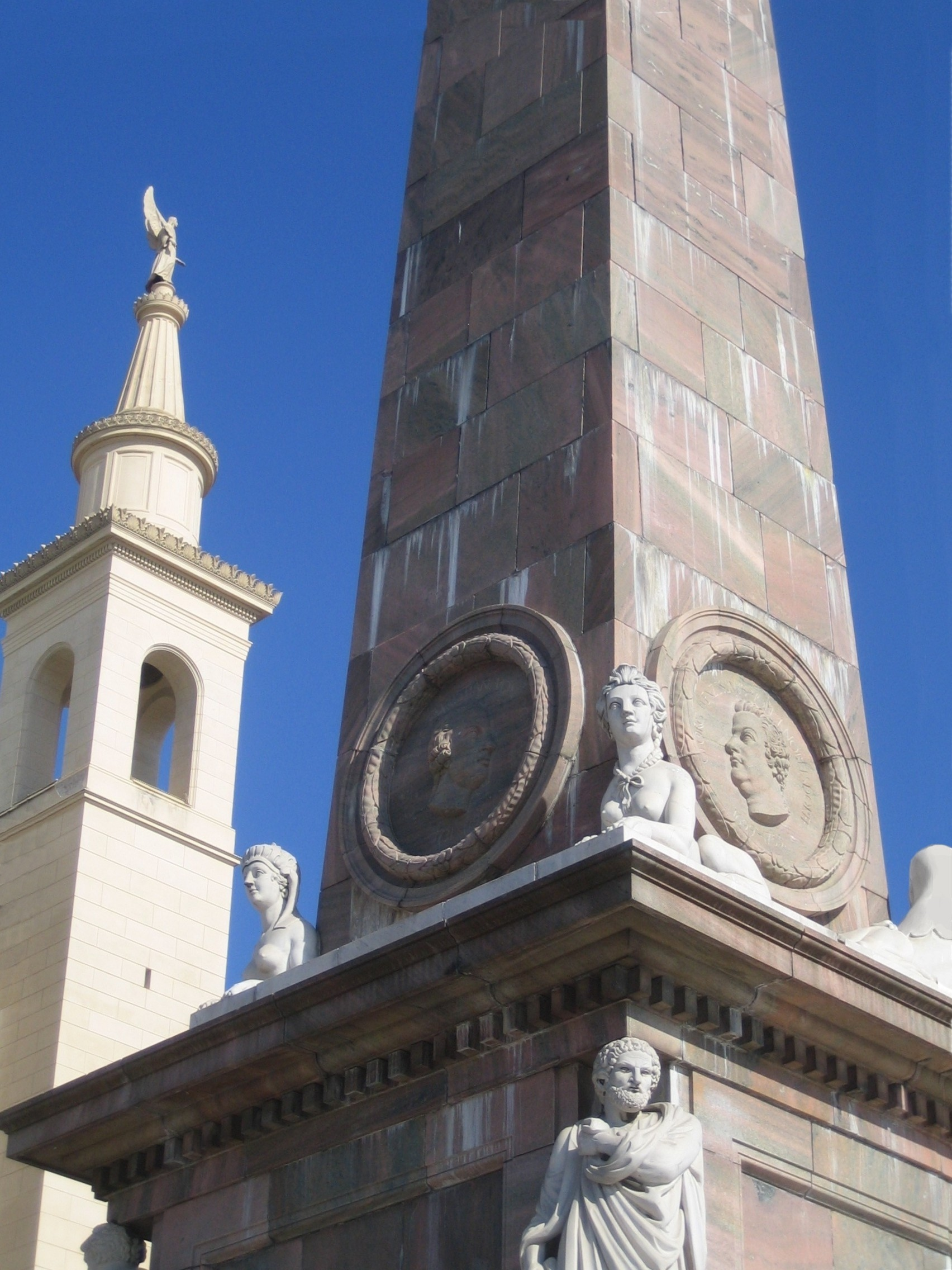
Ornamentation of the marble obelisk (before redevelopment in 2014)

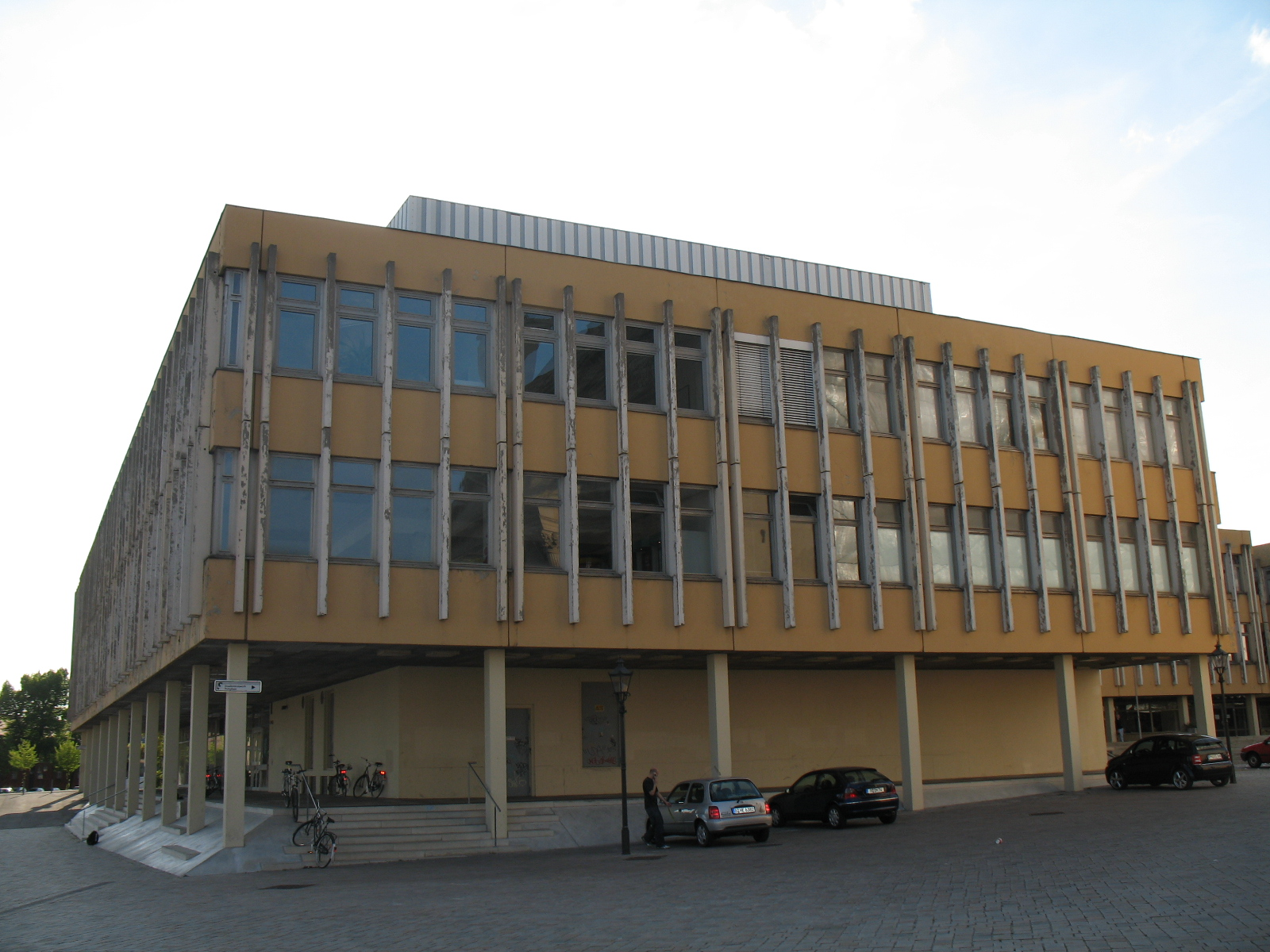
The Fachhochschule Potsdam, demolished in 2018.

Construction projects at and around the Old Market Square:

- The Museum Barberini (construction finished in 2016)
- Housing and shopping areas (construction started around 2020, first house (Klingnersches Haus) unveiled 2023)
- Steubenplatz, with a memorial of Friedrich Wilhelm von Steuben (in planning)
- The Ringerkolonnade will be moved back from the Potsdam Lustgarten to its old position by the City Palace.

== Notable residents ==
Olaf Scholz- Former German chancellor from 2019 to 2025

Britta Ernst- Politician, former State Minister for Education and Youth of Brandenburg, wife of Olaf Scholz
