= Matthias von Stegmann =

German actor and voice actor

- Born: 1968 (age 57–58)
- Occupations: Actor; Voice-over speaker; Voice-over writer; Voice-over director; Stage director; Opera director
- Organizations: Bayreuth Festival

Matthias von Stegmann (born 1968) is a German actor, voice-over speaker and writer, author and stage director for theatre and especially opera who works internationally. He wrote dialogue and directed it for German versions of American series such The Simpsons. In opera, he has focused on the work of Richard Wagner. He staged a version of his Der Ring des Nibelungen for children, first in Tokyo, then in German at the Vienna State Opera and in Zurich. He staged in 2012 Tristan und Isolde in Minden, and in 2013 the first performance of Rienzi at the Bayreuth Festival.

== Career ==
Stegmann is the son of a Japanese mother and a German father. He began a career as a voice-over speaker (Synchronsprecher) at age ten, and was heard in TV series such as Little House on the Prairie (Unsere kleine Farm) and The Bad News Bears (Die Bären sind los). He received the Abitur of the Otto-von-Taube-Gymnasium in Gauting in 1987.

Stegmann wrote his first voice-over script at age 19 and first worked directing voice-over dialogue at age 20. He wrote dialogues and directed them for Cheers, Becker, The Young Indiana Jones Chronicles (Die Abenteuer des jungen Indiana Jones), The Nanny (Die Nanny), Home Improvement (Hör mal, wer da hämmert), Clueless, Mega Man, That '70s Show (Die wilden 70er), The Simpsons and Boston Legal. After the death of Ivar Combrinck in 2006 he was his successor for the series The Simpsons, Futurama and Family Guy.

Stegmann was assistant of the stage director at the Bayreuth Festival from 1991 to 2005. He staged at the New National Theatre Tokyo in 2005 Wagner's Der Ring des Nibelungen for children, in 2007 Wagner's Der fliegende Holländer and in 2008 Weber's Der Freischütz. The children's version of the Ring Cycle was presented in 2007 in a German version at the Vienna State Opera, and in 2008 at the Opernhaus Zürich.

Stegmann staged at the Hungarian State Opera in 2009 Verdi's I vespri siciliani. In 2011 he directed Mozart's Die Hochzeit des Figaro at the Operklosterneuburg festival, in 2012 Wagner's Lohengrin for Tokyo. He staged Wagner's Tristan und Isolde at the Stadttheater Minden, in a performance that received international recognition. Dara Hobbs and Andreas Schager performed the title roles, and the Nordwestdeutsche Philharmonie was conducted in the back of the stage by Frank Beermann. E reviewer noted his "phenomenal" staging of the interactions of the characters, making every breath, every look, every step and every phrase of the singers a personal experience ("Eine geradezu phänomenale Personenregie mit Sängern, die das umsetzen können, lässt uns jeden Atemzug, jeden Augenaufschlag, jeden Schritt und jede Phrase der Sänger zum ganz persönlichen Erlebnis werden.").

In 2013, Stegmann staged in Bayreuth Wagner's Rienzi as part of the celebrations of Wagner's bicentenary, conducted by Christian Thielemann. It was the first performance of the opera in Bayreuth. He directed in the 2013/14 at the Theater Kiel Puccini's Madama Butterfly, and a year later Toshio Hosokawa's Matsukaze.

As an actor, he appeared in the part of Bassa Selim in Mozart's Die Entführung aus dem Serail at the Metropolitan Opera in 2003, repeated in 2008.
