= Uwe Eric Laufenberg =

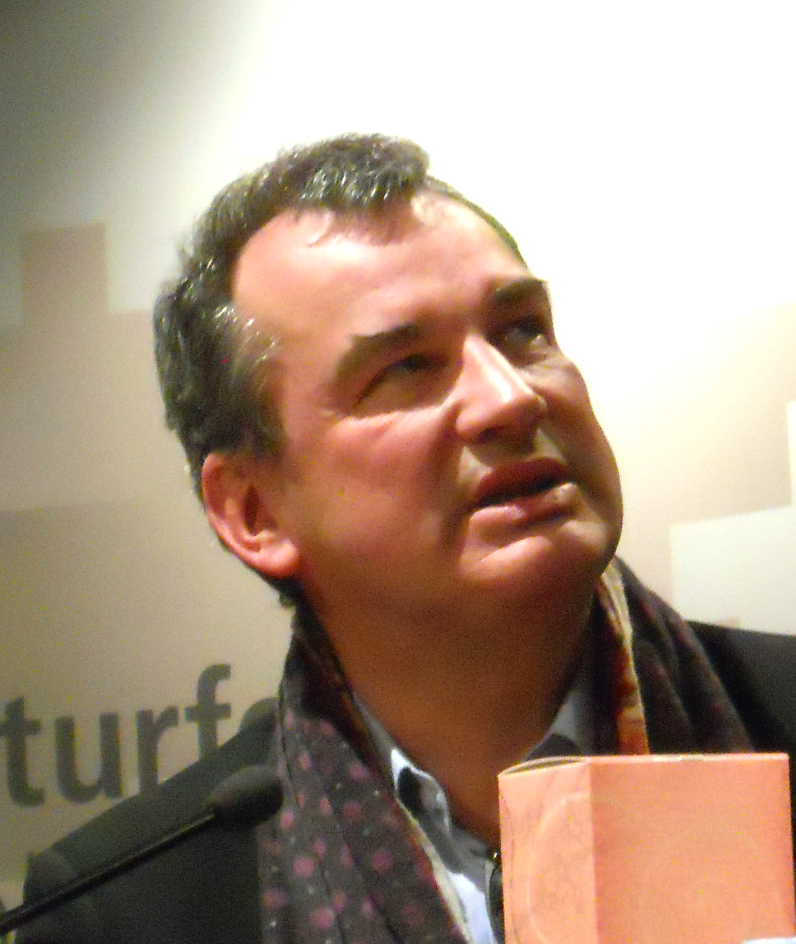
- In 2014
- Born: 11 December 1960 (age 65); Cologne
- Education: Folkwang Hochschule
- Occupations: Actor; Stage director; Theatre manager
- Organizations: Hans Otto Theater; Cologne Opera; Hessisches Staatstheater Wiesbaden
- Website: www.uwe-laufenberg.de

Uwe Eric Laufenberg (born 11 December 1960) is a German actor, stage director for play and opera, and theatre manager who has directed at international opera houses and festivals, such as Elektra at the Vienna State Opera and Parsifal at the Bayreuth Festival.

He was Intendant of the Hans Otto Theater in Potsdam, the Cologne Opera, and has been Intendant of the Hessisches Staatstheater Wiesbaden from 2014, where he staged Wagner's Der Ring des Nibelungen, presented at the Internationale Maifestspiele 2017.

== Career ==
Born in Cologne, he studied from 1981 to 1983 at the Folkwang Hochschule Essen. He was an assistant of Ruth Berghaus, Rudolf Noelte, Jean-Pierre Ponnelle and Peter Stein, among others. He worked first in 1983 at the Staatstheater Darmstadt. From 1985, he was an actor and Regieassistent (assistant of the stage director) at the Schauspiel Frankfurt. He directed from 1988 Harald Kuhlmann's Pfingstläuten, Die Gerechten by Albert Camus, Rainald Goetz' Krieg, Ferdinand Bruckner's Krankheit der Jugend and Rückkehr in die Wüste by Bernard Marie Koltès.

In 1990, Laufenberg moved to the Theater Köln, where he directed Tankred Dorst's Merlin oder Das wüste Land, Dürrenmatt's Der Besuch der alten Dame and Goethe's Clavigo, among others. From 1992, he directed operas at international locations, such as Ariadne auf Naxos by Richard Strauss at La Monnaie, Smetana's Die verkaufte Braut at the Volksoper Wien, and Puccini's Tosca at the Grand Théâtre de Genève. He directed Ernst Krenek's Karl V. for the Bregenzer Festspiele 2008, and Mozart's Don Giovanni at the National Center for the Performing Arts in Peking.

From 2004 to 2009, Laufenberg was Intendant (General Manager) of the Hans Otto Theater in Potsdam. He designed the concept Potsdam unterwegs (Potsdam on the road), presenting a production at various locations of the town. From the 2009/10 season, he managed the Cologne Opera. He staged a Mozart cycle of Don Giovanni, Die Entführung aus dem Serail and La clemenza di Tito. The house earned the title Opernhaus des Jahres (Opera house of the year) in 2012. He canceled his contract the same year. He wrote a novel about his experiences, titled Palermo and published in 2013.

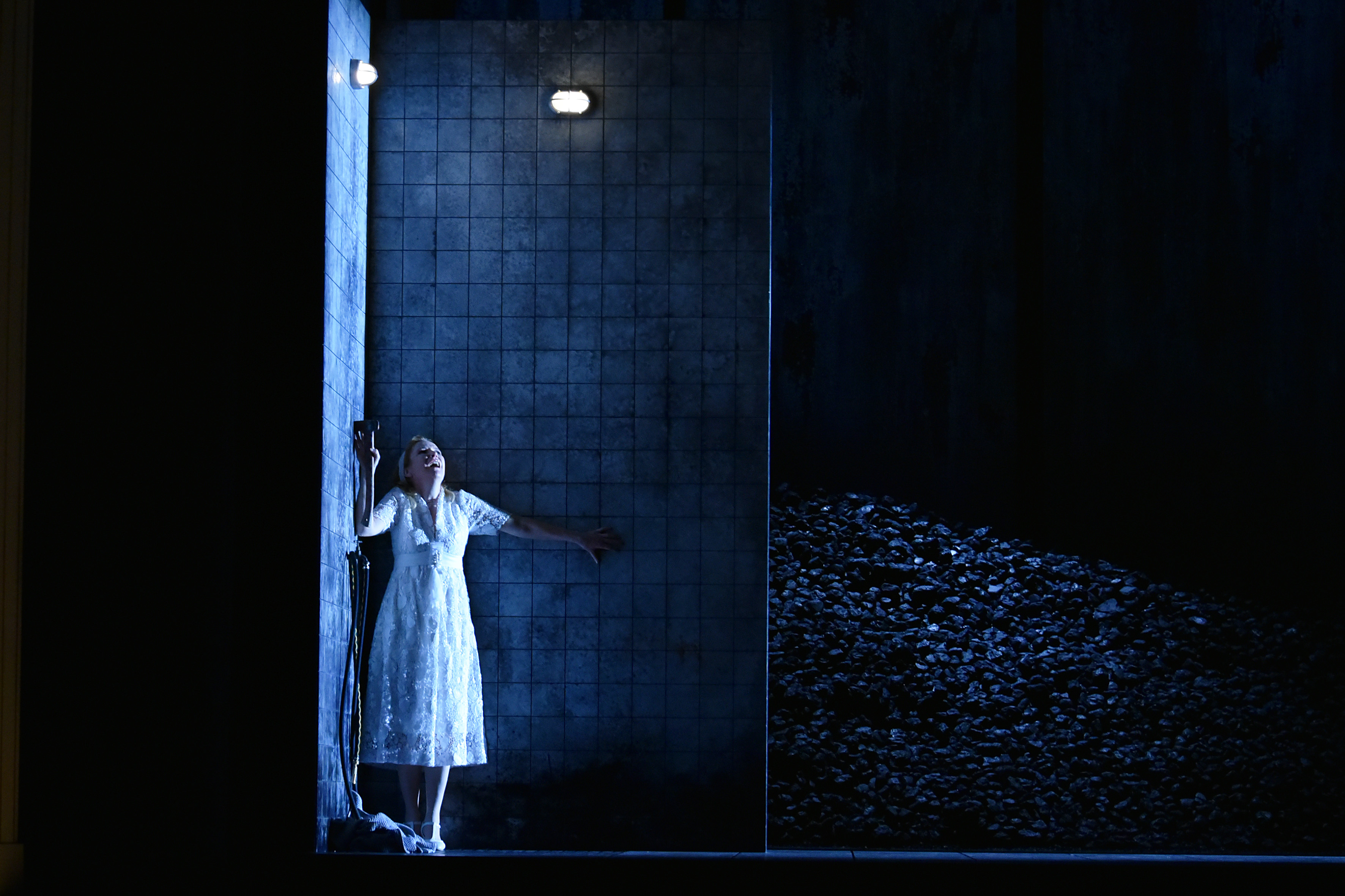
A scene from Elektra at the Vienna State Opera

From 2013 to 2015, Laufenberg directed for the Linz Opera Wagner's Der Ring des Nibelungen, conducted by Dennis Russell Davies. He has been Intendant of the Hessisches Staatstheater Wiesbaden from the 2014/15 season. His first production there was Die Frau ohne Schatten by Richard Strauss.

In 2015 he staged Elektra by Strauss at the Vienna State Opera, conducted by Mikko Franck. He directed at the Bayreuth Festival of 2016 a new production of Parsifal.

His focus in Wiesbaden in the 2016/17 season has been again Wagner's Ring des Nibelungen, staged by him based on his Linz version, and conducted by Alexander Joel. It was presented twice during the Internationale Maifestspiele Wiesbaden 2017, conducted by Alexander Joel. Among the soloists were the Bayreuth singers Evelyn Herlitzius as Brünnhilde and Andreas Schager as both Siegmund and Siegfried. Sabina Cvilak appeared as Sieglinde, and Egils Silins as Wotan.. Laufenberg left the position on 22 January 2024.

== Literature ==
- Uwe Eric Laufenberg: Palermo. Strauss Medien, Potsdam 2013, ISBN 978-3-943713-18-3.
