= Hans Otto (actor) =

German stage actor (1900–1933)

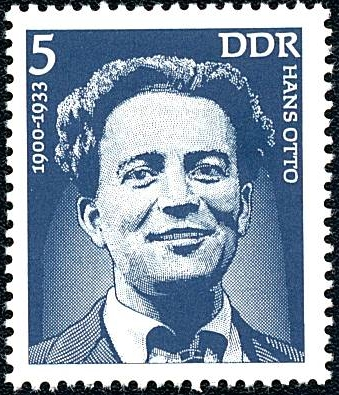
- Born: 10 August 1900; Dresden, Saxony, Germany
- Died: 24 November 1933 (aged 33); Berlin, Germany
- Occupations: Stage actor Screen actor Communist activist Anti-government resistance activist
- Known for: having been an early victim of the Hitler government. His death following torture and defenestration by Nazi paramilitaries was widely reported outside Germany (and, after 1945, also inside Germany) as a murder.
- Political party: KPD
- Spouse: Marie Viehmeyer (1890-1959: stage name "Mie Paulun")
- Children: none
- Parents: Hermann August Theodor Otto (father); Amalie Wilhelmine Bellmann (1866-1911) (mother)

Hans Otto (10 August 1900 - 24 November 1933) was a German stage actor. He came to prominence at a relatively young age. From the world of theatre, one of the greatest admirers of his talents, on and off the stage, was Bertolt Brecht. Towards the end of 1933 he was murdered by Nazi paramilitaries, becoming one of the Hitler government's first victims from the world of the arts. At the time of his murder he had been a member of the Communist Party for almost ten years.

== Life ==
=== Provenance and early years ===
Hans Otto was born in Dresden where Hermann August Theodor Otto, his father, worked in a managerial-clerical job for the government of Saxony. He was the oldest of five brothers, but only his parents' second child: the boys had a big sister. He grew up with his family in Dresden-Neustadt. When Hans was not quite twelve his mother, born Amalie Wilhelmine Bellmann (1866-1911), died. His father remarried almost at once.

As he grew up he came under parental pressure, which he firmly rejected, to make his way in the world as a businessman. Between 1914 and 1918 he attended two secondary schools, at each of which he distinguished himself in school drama productions. He probably developed a determination to become a stage actor at a young age, but did not initially dare mention the plan to his overbearing father. At one of the schools he attended a fellow pupil was Erich Kästner, who later achieved literary eminence, principally as an author of books for children. Although Kästner was more than a year older than Otto, he would later describe Otto as his "Klassenkameraden", implying that at school they were taught in the same class. Between June and December 1918 Hans Otto was called up for military service, but the timing was fortunate, in that he had still not been sent to the military front line when the war ended in November.

During 1919 Hans Otto took lessons in stage acting - including voice projection and singing - with Eduard Plate in Dresden and with Robert George. August Otto had still not become reconciled to the idea of his eldest son becoming a theatre actor: this now led to a break between father and son. In 1920, Robert George teamed up with Adam Kuckhoff to found the Künstlertheater (loosely, "Arts Theatre") in Frankfurt, which was where Hans Otto made his stage debut, and where he would become a permanent member of the theatre company for its first three seasons, between 1920 and 1922. This marked the start of a close friendship between Adam Kuckhoff and Hans Otto, who later became step-father to Armin-Gerd Kuckhoff (1912-2002), Kuckhoff's eldest son, and, after he grew up, a noted critic and scholar of the theatre.

=== Stage debut ===
Otto made his 1920 debut at the Frankfurt Künstlertheater in a production by Adam Kuckhoff of Schiller's "Kabale und Liebe" (loosely, "Intrigue and Love"). Over the next few years he appeared with the Frankfurt theatre company in city theatres across the Rhein-Main region, specialising in classical roles. A theatre critic at the time commended his "cuttingly sharp artistic personality ... a perfect specimen of a thoroughly modern approach to [stage] art". (Note: "...eine scharf umrissene künstlerische Persönlichkeit ... vom vollendeten Typ einer ganz modernen Künstlerart.")

=== "Mie Paulun" ===
On 16 October 1922 Otto Hans married Marie Kuckhoff (born Marie Viehmeyer), the divorced first wife of his friend. Ten years his senior, Marie Kuckhoff was an actress, frequently identified in sources by her stage name as "Mie Paulun". The marriage was by some criteria childless, except that Marie's son by her former marriage stayed with his mother and thereby acquired Hans Otto as his apparently devoted step-father. Through the 1920s, as politics became more polarised, public figures in Germany came under growing pressure to "choose a side". There are indications that through her new young husband Marie Otto-Paulun became increasingly politicised, and that through the two of them the former dramaturge and successful theatre director Adam Kuckhoff also came to a heightened level of political awareness which in 1943 would lead to his execution under then Hitler government.

=== Hamburg and Gera ===
For the 1923/24 season Otto moved to Hamburg where he worked a season at the recently opened and already widely admired Kammerspiele Theatre under the direction of its young founder-director Erich Ziegel. The period was one of intensified economic hardship, accompanied by a peaking of the post-war hyperinflation. In October 1923 the economic collapse triggered the Hamburg Uprising. The northern port cities had a long tradition of left-wing political militancy, and Otto came into contact with the labour movement at this time, which left him with a deep commitment to many of the ideals of the Communist Party which had been founded in Berlin during 1918/19. Sources differ as to whether it was in 1923, 1924 or 1927 that Hans Otto actually became a member of the party, but it is clear that from his time in Hamburg, if not earlier, he was a supporter.

In 1924 he moved south, taking a position with the theatre company of the Reußische Theatre (as it was then known) at which the spirit of the pre-war court theatre which the baroque building had accommodated before 1918. There are indications that there may have been explosive clashes of will between Hans Otto and the enthusiastic youthful Theatre General Intendant (theatre director) Walter Bruno Iltz. Gera lacked the "big city dynamic" of Frankfurt, Hamburg or Berlin, and according to one source it was with some relief that in 1926 Otto returned to Hamburg, where between 1926 and 1929 he performed at the Deutsches Schauspielhaus, to which Erich Ziegel transferred from the Kammerspiele Theatre at around the same time. Ziegel moved on after a couple of years, but Otto remained at the Hamburg Schauspielhaus under his successor, Hermann Röbbeling, for another year.

=== Berlin ===
The later 1920s were something of a golden age for the theatre in Germany, and in Hamburg they represented a high point in the stage career of Hans Otto. Throughout 1929 he made a number of theatre appearances in Berlin, and by the end of that year he was ready to move permanently to the German capital, entering into a contract with Victor Barnowsky's "Theater in der Königgrätzer Straße" - renamed in 1930 as the "Theater in der Stresemannstraße". There were also appearances during the 1929/30 season at Berlin's Lessing Theater. A year after signing up with the "Theater in der Stresemannstraße" he moved on the work with Leopold Jessner at the Berlin Schauspielhaus on the Gendarmenmarkt square, remaining at the theatre after Ernst Legal took over the day—to-day management responsibilities from Jessner. With his good looks and energetic stagecraft he was often selected for youthful romantic and heroic roles. An example in 1929 was his appearance at Berlin's "Theater in der Königgrätzer Straße" in the title role of "Winnetou, the Red [Indian] Gentleman", with Ludwig Körner, in a stage drama based on "wild-west fiction" by Karl May.

=== Movie work ===
Early in his stage career Hans Otto turned down, on political grounds, the offer to work on Fridericus Rex (1922/23), a silent movie and, as matters turned out, the first in a series of four immensely popular films, directed by Arzén von Cserépy, which celebrated various episodes from the life of Frederick the Great. One of the few movies in which he did agree to appear was, the UFA production, "Das gestohlene Gesicht" (1930, loosely, "The Stolen Face") a Crime film directed by Erich Schmidt in which Otto took the lead role of "Bill Breithen".

=== Political engagement during a new decade ===
In 1930, Otto became chairman of the Berlin district "Arbeiter-Theater-Bund" (loosely, "Theater Workers' Association") and a union representative for the "Gewerkschaft der Deutschen Bühnenangehörigen" ("Union of German Stage Performers" / GDBA). The more the social and political situation deteriorated in the aftermath of the Wall Street crash, the more clearly Hans Otto saw the dangers inherent in the rise of fascism in Germany, and the more energetically he worked in support of his own political convictions. As a high-profile and popular stage actor who was also a known Communist Party member, he found that his home was subject to regular visits and house searches by the police. Tirelessly he addressed political meetings, crafted newspaper articles and appeals, and contributed to the production political leaflets. And he led his own life by his convictions. He shared his fees, and when fellow actors fell on hard times and found themselves homeless, he would provide them with accommodation in the small apartment that he shared with his wife.

Otto continued to take theatre work between 1930 and 1933, but most of his appearances now were on a freelance basis, as a "guest star". He also embarked on a sideline as a left-wing political journalist, working on the stage and screen trade journal "Arbeiterbühne und Film" under a pseudonym that incorporated the maiden name of his late mother, "Hans Bellmann". In January 1933, exploiting the parliamentary deadlock that had led to the increasing application of government by presidential decree since 1930, the Hitler government took power and quickly transformed the country into a one-party dictatorship. It became apparent that during their year in opposition the National Socialists had been carefully observing and recording the identities of their political enemies. For Adolf Hitler, Communist activists topped that particular list. Meanwhile, it was also at the start of 1933, on 21 January 1933, that Otto Hans starred as "Kaiser" (the emperor) in the stage premier of Faust, Part Two, at the Prussian State Theatre, alongside Gustaf Gründgens and Werner Krauss.

On 27 February 1933, Otto received the information that his contract with the Prussian State Theatre was not to be extended. There was, according to at least one source, an offer of further stage work if he would renounce Communism: he turned it down. Dr. Franz Ulbrich had been appointed on behalf of the government to take over at the theatre, formally with effect from 1 March 1933: Ulbrich's responsibilities included, with immediate effect, all decisions involving "the appointment of artistic personnel". Hans Otto gave his final performance as the emperor in Faust, Part Two on 23 May 1933. By that time his trades union duties had also been removed from him.

As soon as Hans Otto's problems with the Prussian state theater in Berlin became known, he received an urgent invitation from Max Reinhardt to come and work at the Reinhardt-Bühnen (Reinhardt's own theatre) in Vienna. (Austria despite following a parallel anti-democratic path to that of Germany remained a separate country till 1938.) But Otto was by now irrevocably committed to his anti-Nazi mission, which for him meant staying in Germany and continuing with his perilous "underground work" there.

=== Arrest and murder ===
On 13 November 1933 Hans Otto was detained by Nazi paramilitaries at a café by the Viktoria-Luise-Platz in west-central Berlin. He was taken, in the first instance, to the Café Komet in Berlin-Stralau a few kilometers to the east, where he found he was one of a number of detainees rounded up and gathered together in this improvised collection point and, as he now discovered, torture location. During an intense interrogation he suffered the first in a succession of brutal physical assaults. He was then taken with other detainees to a facility at nearby Berlin-Köpenick where he underwent further violent assault. He was beaten and kicked repeatedly, causing him to lose consciousness. His interrogators were determined - but unsuccessful - in their efforts to force him to disclose the identities of comrades in the underground anti-government resistance community. This served to enrage his attackers further. Despite his own injuries, comrades would later recall that Otto was unceasing in his own efforts to encourage fellow detainees, suffering similar treatment, with words of consolation and courage. Next he was taken to an SA station in the Möllendorffstraße (Berlin-Lichtenberg) and from there to the Security Services' Reich Security Main Office in the Prinz-Albrecht-Straße (as it was known till 1951). He was finally taken to the paramilitaries' barracks at the NSDAP party head office at Voßstraße 11. Here, after a final session, interrogators noticed that he had "stopped moving": it is not clear whether or not they thought Hans Otto was still alive at this point. In order to avoid being thought to have killed him, the security services officer now carried him upstairs to the third floor, from where they threw him out of a window, intending to explain that he had "committed suicide", should they find themselves called upon to account for his condition. On 24 November 1933 Hans Otto died from his injuries in a "police hospital".

The killing of Hans Otto was one of the first atrocities performed on behalf of the Hitler government to gain widespread media coverage outside Germany. Within the country, however, the Minister for People's Enlightenment and Propaganda, Joseph Goebbels, placed a ban on the reporting of the death. There was also a general prohibition on attending Otto's funeral, which was paid for by Gustaf Gründgens, another star of the Berlin stage. Even Gründgens did not dare to attend the event, however.

=== Gerhard Hinze ===
The Hamburg actor Gerhard Hinze, usually identified by his later name as Gerard Heinz, was arrested at the same time as Hans Otto. Much of what is known of Hans Otto's final days came to public notice only twelve years later, after 1945, when Hinze felt at liberty to share his information.

== Burial ==
The physical remains of Hans Otto was laid to rest on 29 November 1933 at Berlin-Wilmersdorf not in the main cemetery there, but at the Stahnsdorf Cemetery close by. The cause of death, which had to be recorded before the burial could proceed, was entered as "suicide by jumping off the roof of a house". (Note: "Selbstmord durch Absprung vom Dach eines Hauses") The true circumstances of Otto's death were not officially recorded at the time. After a long campaign, his grave was promoted to the status of "Berlin Grave of honour" ("Ehrengrabstelle des Landes Berlin").

== Celebration ==
- Klaus Mann referenced Hans Otto in 1936 with the character "Otto Ulrichs" in his controversial novel Mephisto, published, in the first instance, from exile while Mann was living in Amsterdam.
- The "Potsdamer Schauspielhaus" (theater) was renamed in October 1952 as the "Hans Otto Theater"
- In 1967 the "Leipzig Theater Academy" had its name lengthened, becoming the "Theaterhochschule 'Hans Otto' Leipzig". After the academy was closed down in 1992, the "Hans Otto" soubriquet was transferred to the Drama Institute at the newly reconfigured and enlarged Leipzig University of Music and Theatre.
- Several streets in Germany have been named "Hans-Otto-Straße" ("Hans Otto Street"). There are examples in Berlin Gera and Leipzig.
- Under the "German Democratic Republic" (1949-1990) the regional theatres took part in the "Hans-Otto-Wettbewerb" (competition) in which the winner received a portrait-bust of Hans Otto. This "Hans Otto Prize" was revived since 2000, with support from the "Kleine Freiheit" (loosely, "Small Freedoms") arts association of Dresden.
- Under the "German Democratic Republic" (1949-1990) the "Hans Otto Medal" was an annual performance arts award. Noted recipients included the Fambach People's Choir in 1978 and, in 1985, the actress Elisabeth Bergner.
- Stolpersteine to his memory have been placed outside the houses in which Hans Otto lived in Berlin-Moabit, and in which he was born in Dresden.
