= Fachhochschule Potsdam =

Coordinates: 52.4126°N 13.0509°E

University of Applied Sciences Potsdam
- Fachhochschule Potsdam
- Type: Public
- Established: 1991
- Faculty: 102 (97) 2010 (2008)
- Administrative staff: 260 (245) 2010 (2008)
- Students: 3.282 WS 2012/13
- Location: Potsdam, Brandenburg, Germany
- Campus: Urban, suburban
- Website: www.fh-potsdam.de

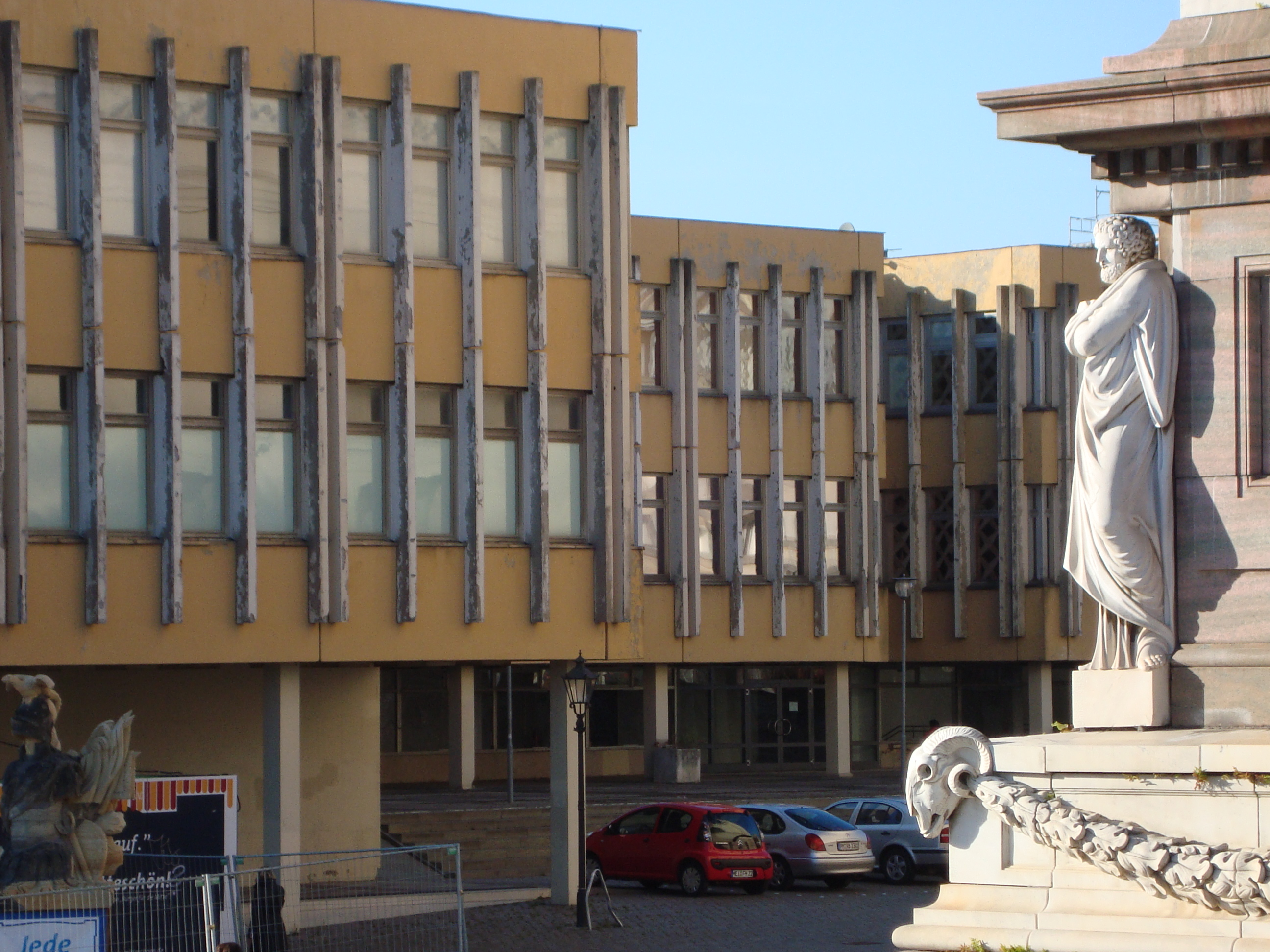
Former Fachhochschule building on the Alte Markt, now demolished

The Fachhochschule Potsdam is a University of Applied Sciences in Potsdam, the capital of the German federal state of Brandenburg. It was founded in 1991 and teaching began in the 1991/92 winter semester.

== History ==
After the state of Brandenburg was founded again in 1990 following the German Reunification, the tertiary education system was restructured. The Fachhochschule Potsdam was thus founded in 1991. Located in the Potsdam district of Neu Fahrland the faculty for Social Sciences was the first to be started in the 1991/92 winter semester. The college's founding principal was Helmut Knüppel. In the same year, the college moved to the former teacher training college in the Friedrich-Ebert-Straße in the town centre.

In 1992 the five departments: architecture, design, construction, and library/documentation science were opened. In 1993 Volker Bley was appointed chancellor and the Freunde und Förderer der Fachhochschule Potsdam e.V. (Association of Friends and Patrons) was founded.

In 1994 the faculties of architecture, design, and construction moved to the newly created campus in Pappelallee in the north of Potsdam.

The Institute for Further Education, Research, and Development was founded as a registered charity in 1994, the management and administration relocated to Pappelallee and a year later the subjects of Cultural Science and Catering were established.

In 1999 the Internationale Begegnungszentrum der Wissenschaften Potsdam (Potsdam International Meeting Centre of Sciences) was opened on the Pappelallee campus. The following year, the European Media Studies degree program was relaunched. Helene Kleine was appointed in 2001 as its first incumbent and the campus underwent further expansion.

In 2003 the laboratory and workshop buildings were opened and Social Work was offered in the first instance as a distance learning programme. Within the framework of the Bologna-Prozess the degrees of diploma (FH), Bachelor, and Master were converted.

In 2009 the foundation stone for the new main building on the Pappelallee campus was laid and Much Haber was appointed rector of the college in 2007. He was followed in 2013 by Eckehard Binas as president. In 2014 a new seminar building was opened.

== Courses ==
All courses are modularized and are rewarded with internationally recognised credits. In addition to the bachelor's degrees almost all faculties also offer courses for master's degrees. Students can take part in courses at all universities in Brandenburg.

The Bachelor's and master's degree courses in European Media Studies, are jointly offered by the college and the University of Potsdam. The Pappelallee college campus offers a degree programme in Interface Design which is almost unique in the whole of Germany .

As of 2015 the college offers courses in Architecture and Urban Development, Civil Engineering, Design, Information Sciences, Conservation and Restoration, Cultural Work, and Social Services.

== Locations ==
The Fachhochschule Potsdam is divided into two locations. Most of the courses take place at the Pappelallee Campus in northern Potsdam in the buildings of the former Adolf-Hitler Barracks of the Wehrmacht Infantry Regiment 9.

The laboratory and workshop buildings that opened in 2003 and the library, theater workshop, and lecture theatres that went into service in 2009 offer opportunities for all fields of study.

The college house on the Alter Markt, which housed the departments for social services and information sciences, was demolished in 2018 as part of redevelopment project.
