= Theater Krefeld und Mönchengladbach =

Theater Krefeld und Mönchengladbach gGmbH is a daughter company of the German cities Krefeld and Mönchengladbach to organize and offer theater play, music show and ballet at local places. Spoken language is German. The staff is a permanent ensemble.

== Venues ==
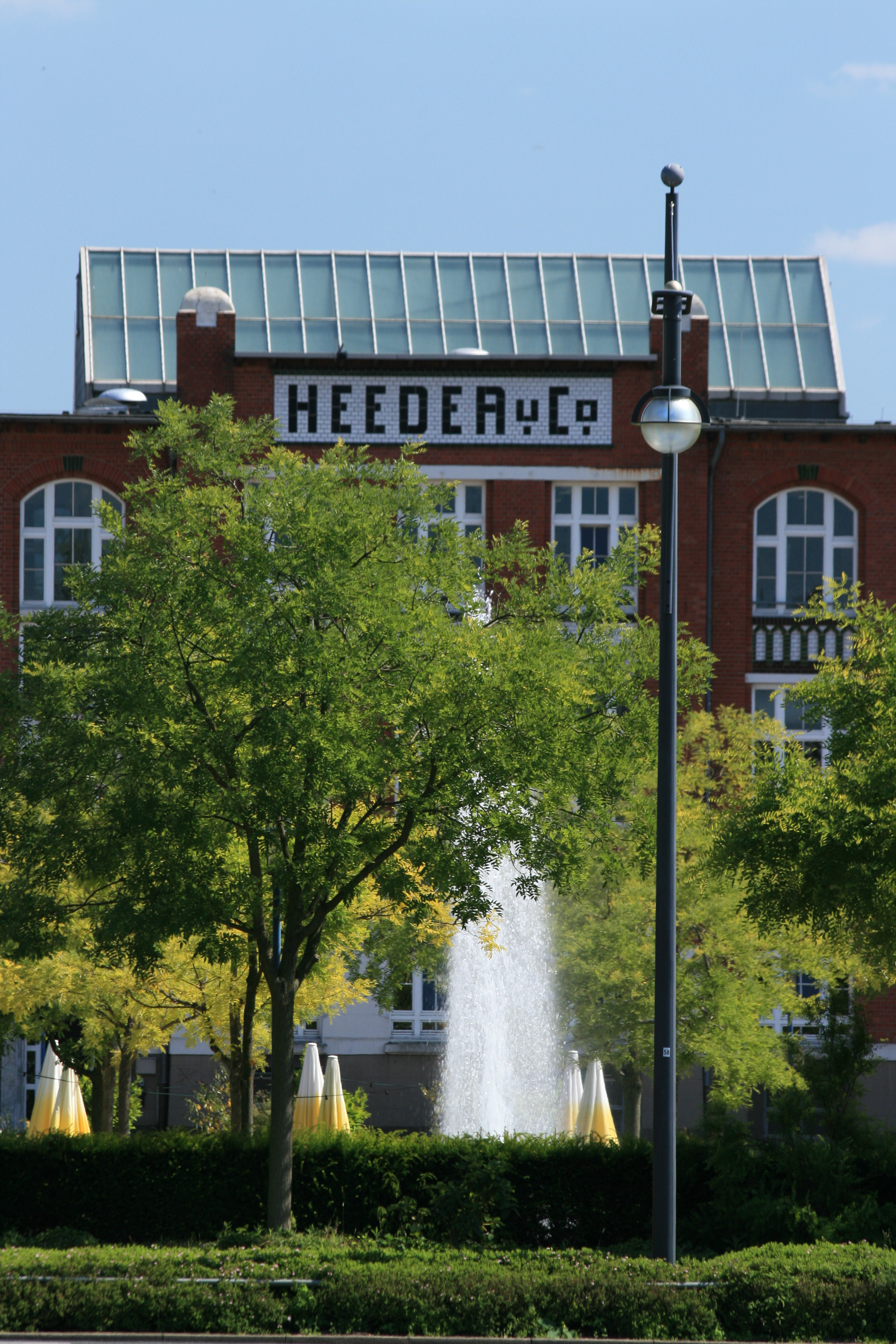
Fabrik Herder,
Krefeld

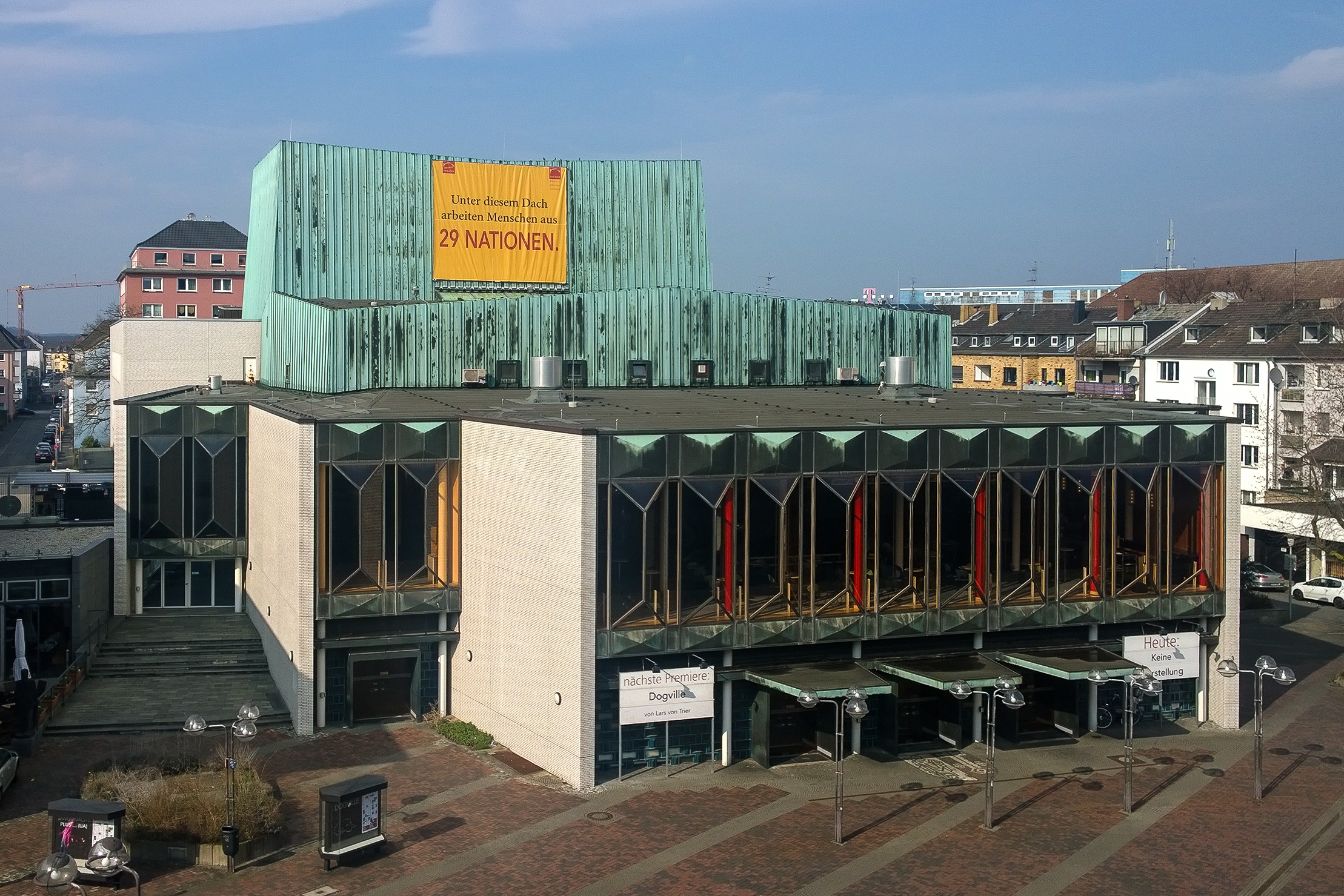
Stadttheater Krefeld,
Krefeld

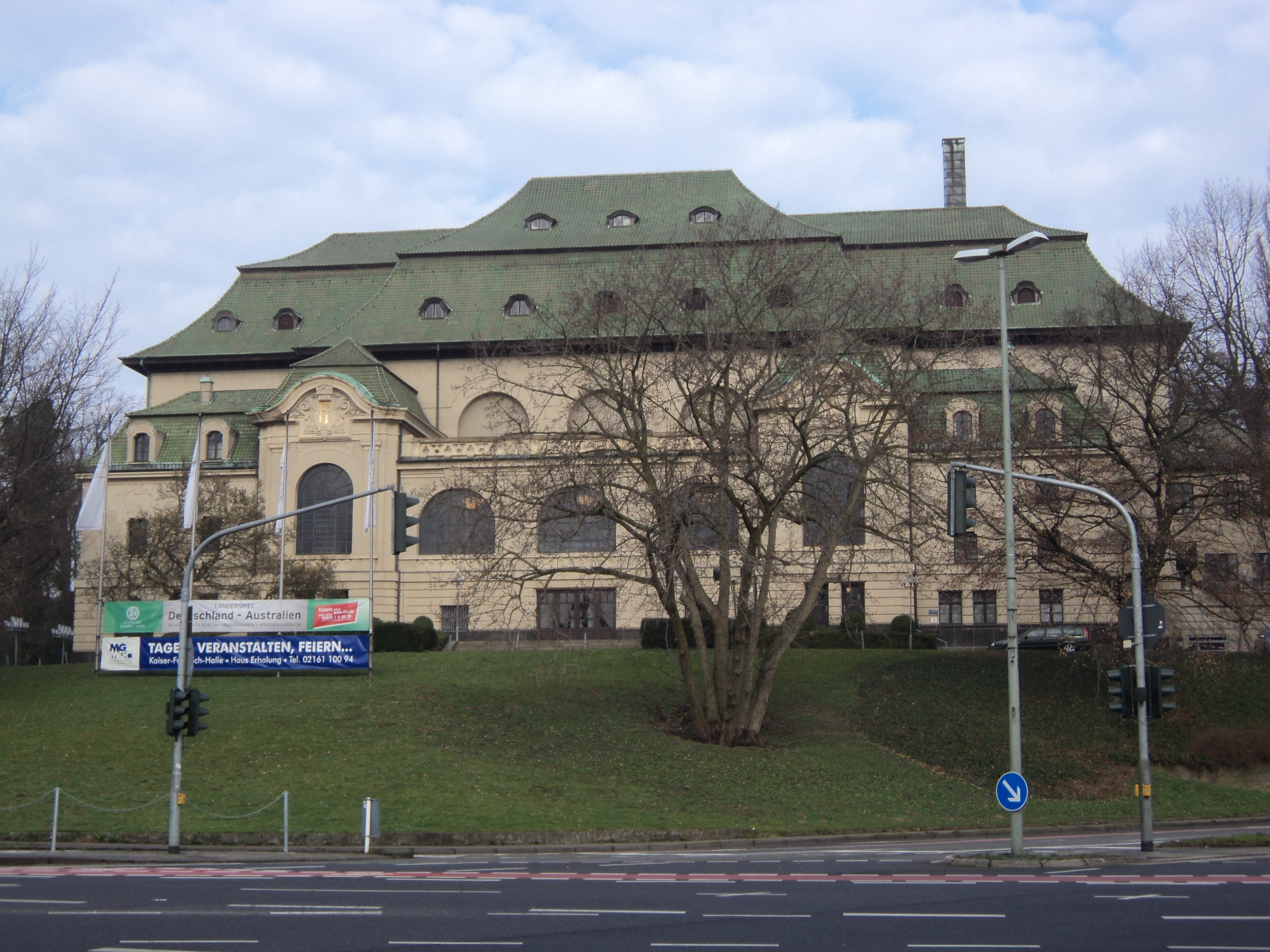
Kaiser-Friedrich-Halle,
Mönchengladbach
