= Alfred Fischer (architect) =

German architect

Alfred Fischer (29 August 1881 – 10 April 1950) was a German architect.

Born in Stuttgart, Alfred Fischer studied from 1900 to 1904 at the Stuttgart Technical University of Architecture under Professor Theodor Fischer (no relation). In 1904 he deferred the 1st State examination and from 1905/1906 worked in Berlin as an assistant for the urban design consultant Ludwig Hoffmann and from 1906 to 1908 with Paul Schultze-Naumburg. In 1909 he became a teacher at the College of Arts and Crafts at the Kunstgewerbeschule Düsseldorf under Wilhelm Kreis. From 1911 to 1933 he led the Essen Arts and Crafts School (later called the Folkwangschule). In 1921 he was awarded a professorship. In 1929 he was awarded an Engineering doctorate from the Hannover Technical University.

Fischer was a member of the German Architects Federation (Bund Deutscher Architekten – BDA) and an executive member of the Deutscher Werkbund (DWB). Apart from his teaching activity he worked freelance as an architect, for some years in partnership with the architect Richard Speidel.

After the change of power in 1933 to the Nazis, as an advocate of modern architecture (see Neue Sachlichkeit, modernism, Bauhaus) and modern training concepts, he experienced increasing difficulties with the school. He was given time off and soon after moved into premature retirement. Fischer left Essen and moved to Murnau.

The Ruhrgebiet has Alfred Fischer to thank for numerous buildings, important examples of regional architectural history and also a legacy of acknowledged contributions to industrial culture.

The title 'Alfred Fischer-Essen' has been given to him to distinguish him from the architect Alfred Fischer who was active at the same time in Karlsruhe. He died at Murnau am Staffelsee in 1950.

== Buildings ==
- Prospect and water tower at Zeche Mont Cenis, 1912–1913, Herne-Sodingen, in the Volkspark
- Factory for the Pit Emil Zeche Königin Elisabeth, 1913, Essen-Frillendorf, Elisabethstraße
- Pit for Zeche Sachsen I/II, 1912–1914, Hamm-Heessen, Sachsenweg (1922–1925 additional buildings by Fischer), transformed later to the event venue Alfred Fischer Hall
- So-called 'Patriotic Monument', 1913, Essen-Bredeney, in the municipal forest west of Bredeneyer Straße
- Power station 'Vorgebirgszentrale', since 1917: 'Goldenberg-Works (and/or 'Kraftwerk Goldenberg'), for the Rheinisch-Westfälische Elektrizitätswerke AG (RWE), 1913–1914, Hürth-Knapsack
- Pumping plant, Alte Emscher for the Emschergenossenschaft (Emscher Cooperative), 1914, Duisburg-Hamborn-Beeck, Alsumer Straße
- 'Volkshaus Rotthausen' (Rotthausen Community Centre), 1919–1920, Gelsenkirchen-Rotthausen, Grüner Weg 3
- Kern House, 1922–1923, Essen-Bredeney, Hohe Buchen 12
- Own House of Alfred Fischer, 1922–1923, Essen-Bredeney, Hohe Buchen 5
- Administration building of AG für Hüttenbetrieb, 1923–1925, Duisburg-Meiderich (Obermeiderich), Emscherstraße 57
- Parish Church of St. Antonius, 1924–1925, Castrop-Rauxel-Ickern, Ickerner Straße 66
- Hans-Sachs-Haus (Office building with shops, concert hall and hotel), 1924–1927, Gelsenkirchen, Ebertstraße / Munkelstraße / Vattmannstraße
- Winding tower for Zeche Königsborn Pit III/IV, 1924–1929, Altenbögge (today now part of Bönen)
- Sachsse House, 1926–1927, Essen-Bredeney, Walter-Sachsse-Weg 8
- Pumping station and smelter for the Emschergenossenschaft, 1927, Duisburg-Hamborn-Schwelgern, Neue Schwelgernstraße 135
- Imhoff House, 1927–1928, Essen, Robert-Schmidt-Straße 8
- Richard Hessberg House, 1928, Essen-Bredeney, Stocksiepen 12
- Administration building for the 'Siedlungsverband Ruhrkohlenbezirk' (today: Regionalverband Ruhr), 1929, Essen, Kronprinzenstraße 35
- Lyseum (today: High School), 1929–1930 (1931?), Essen-Bredeney, Grashofstraße 55/57
- Riding sports hall, 1932, Essen, Wittenbergstraße

== Sources ==
- Fischer, Alfred (1950). Wohnhausform. Wege zur Gestaltung. Ravensburg.
- Busch, Wilhelm (1993). Bauten der 20er Jahre an Rhein und Ruhr. Cologne.
- Hendrich, Jörn-Hanno. "Alfred Fischer-Essen 1881–1950". Deutsches Architektenblatt 1997 (10): 1454ff.
