= Hendrik Willem Schweickhardt =

German painter

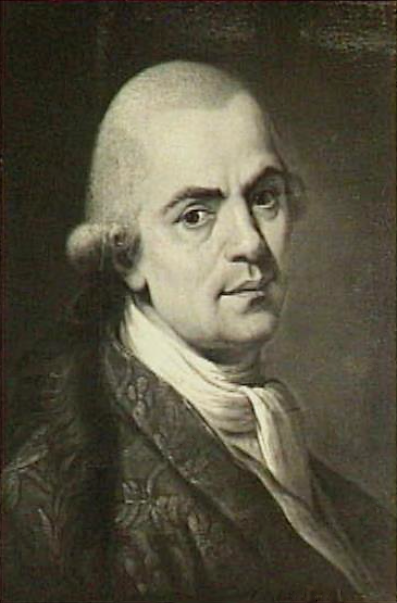
- Hendrik Willem Schweickhardt, self portrait
- Born: Heinrich Wilhelm Schweickhardt; 1747; Hamm, Holy Roman Empire
- Died: 1797 (aged 49–50); London, England
- Other name: Heinrich Wilhelm Schweickhardt (born name)
- Occupations: Painter, Draftsman

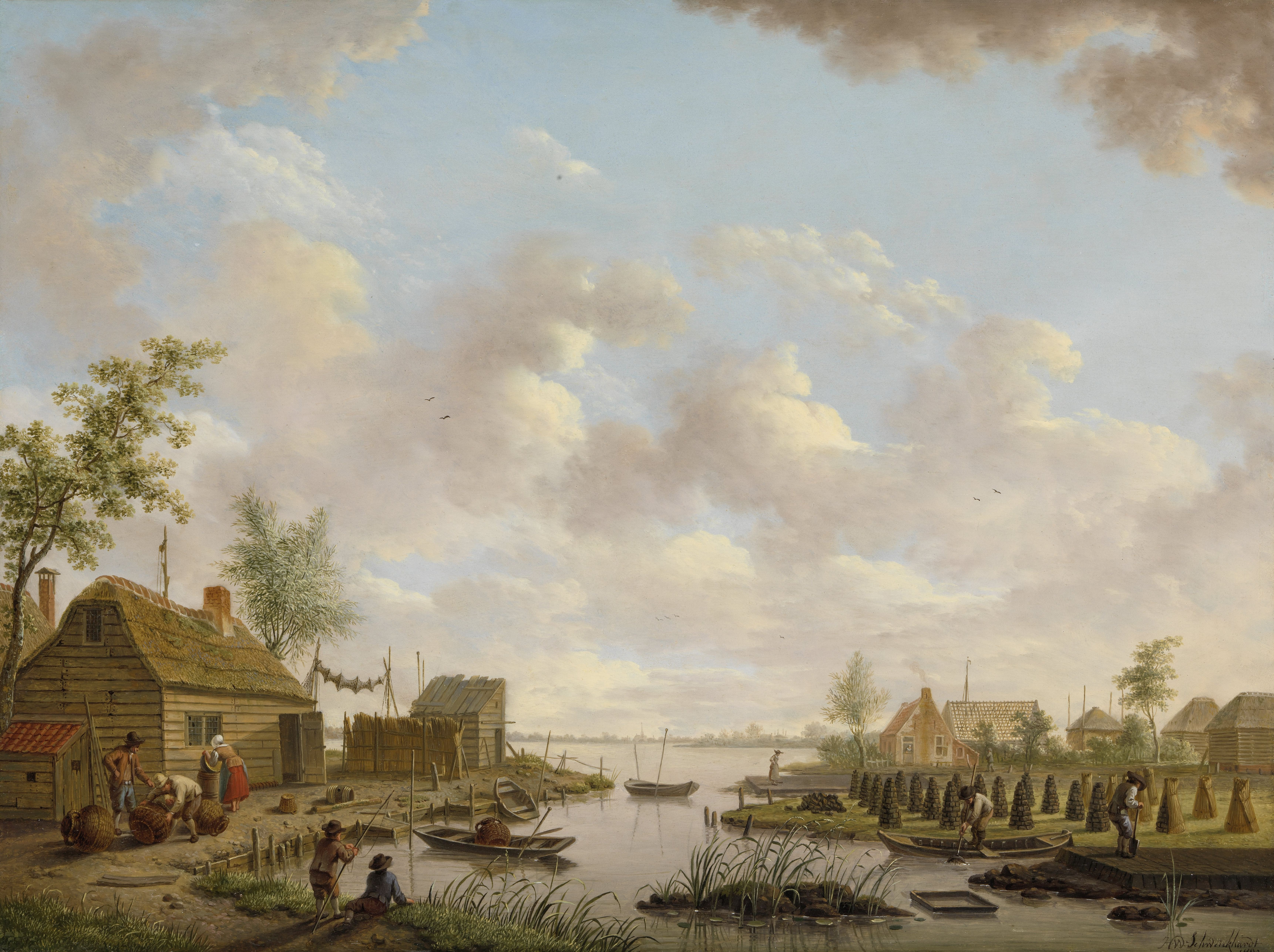
Landscape with fishermen and turf collectors

Hendrik Willem Schweickhardt (born Heinrich Wilhelm Schweickhardt; 1747–1797) was an 18th-century painter from Germany.

== Biography ==
He was born in Hamm and moved to The Hague where he became a pupil of Hieronymus Lapis and started a family. He moved to London in 1786 for economic reasons and did quite well there. His daughter Katharina learned to draw and paint and became a poet; she married Willem Bilderdijk after having an affair with him in 1795 when he taught her and her sisters in London. Schweickhardt died in London.
