= Hamm, Westphalia =

Hamm
- City
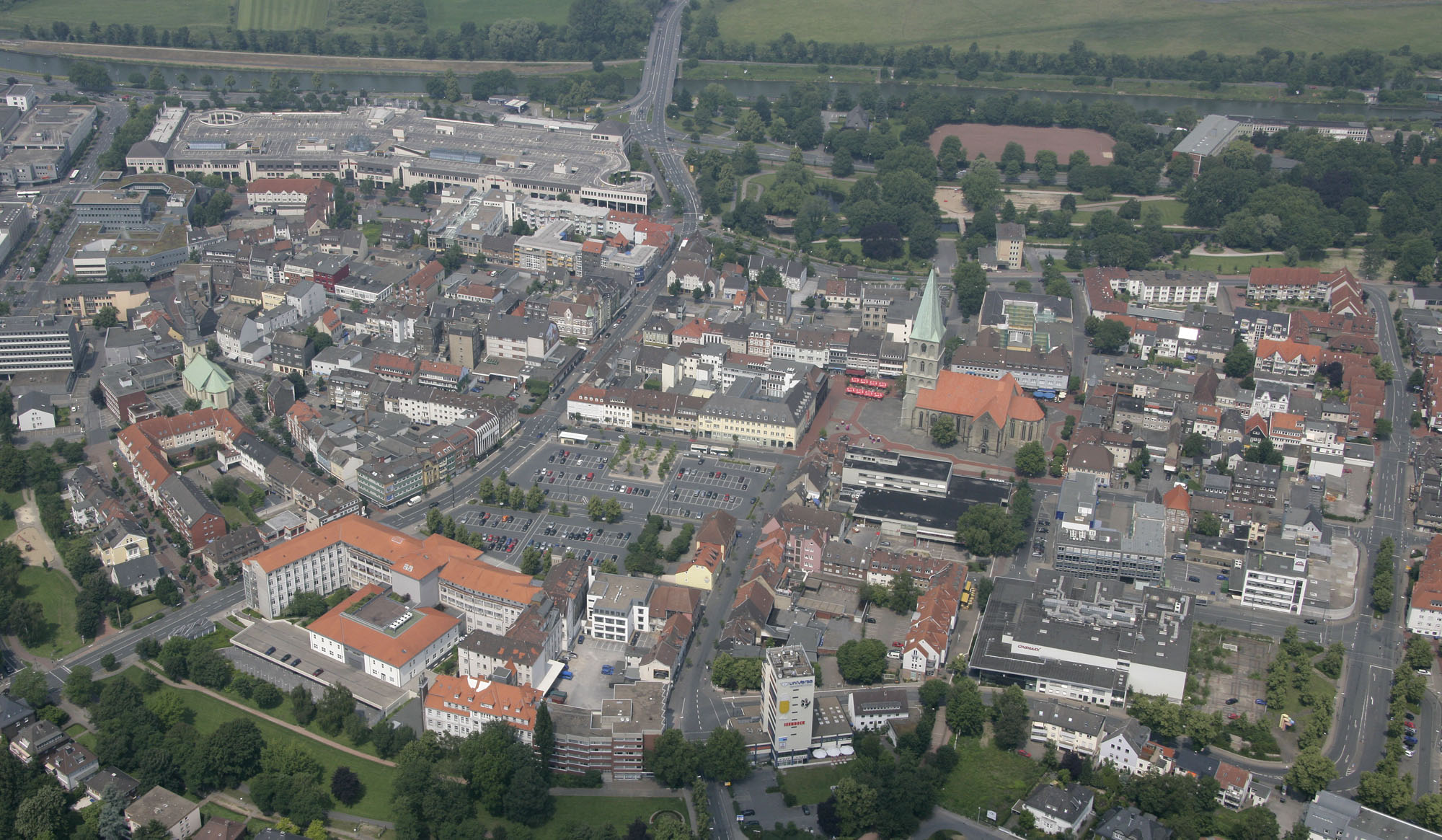
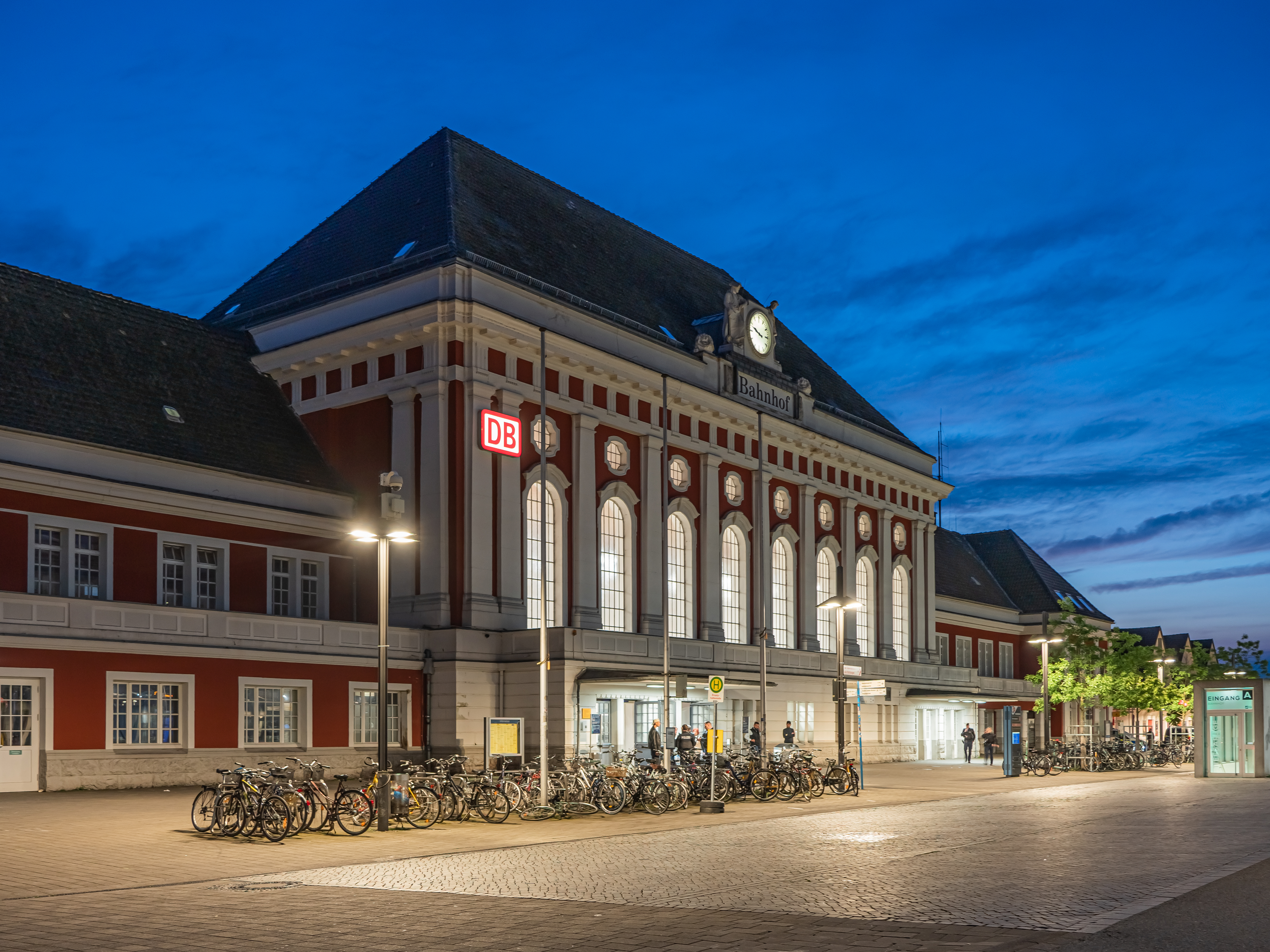
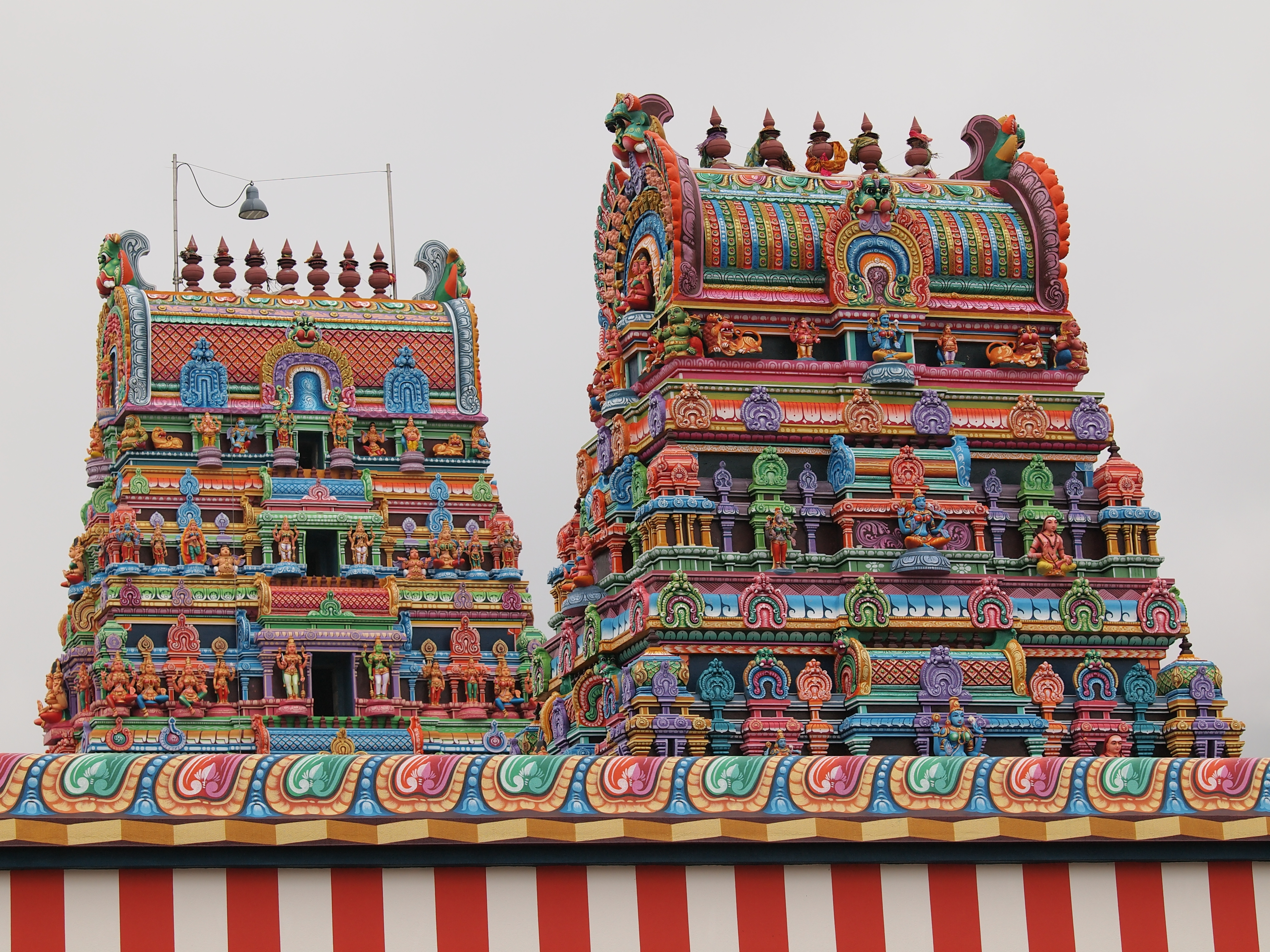
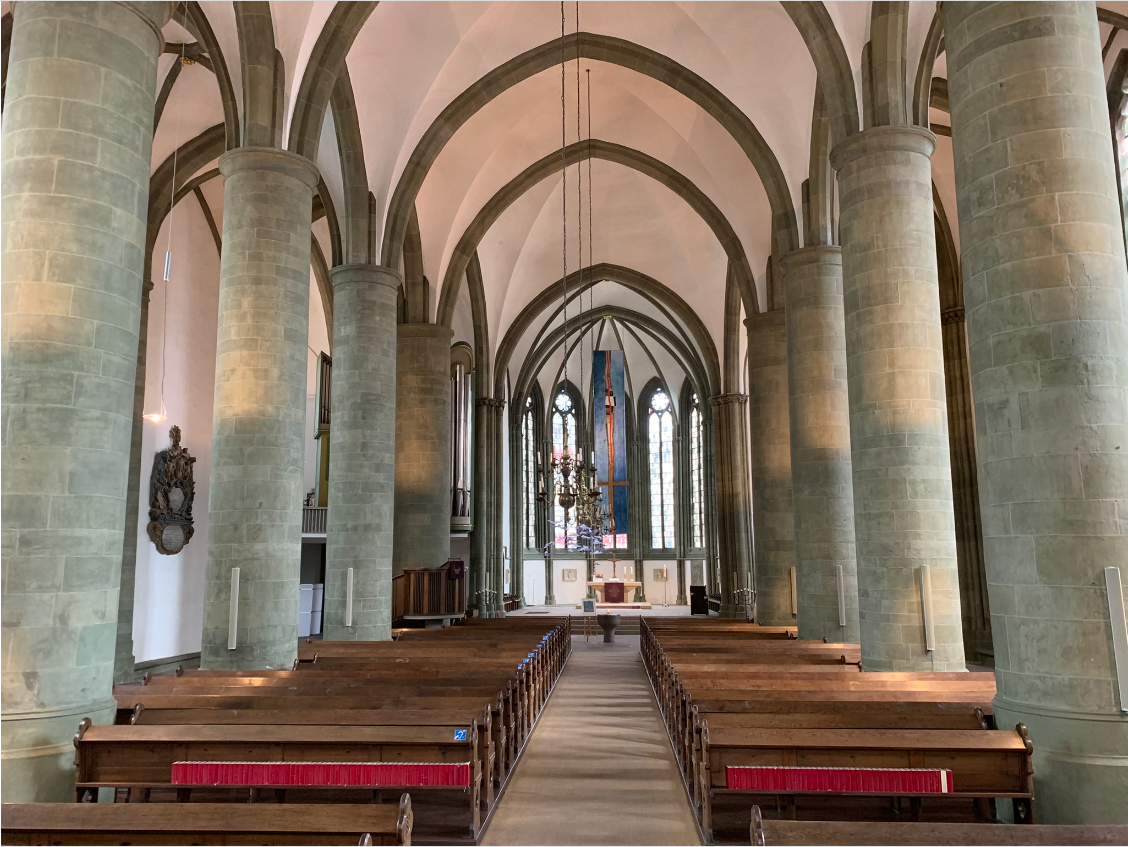
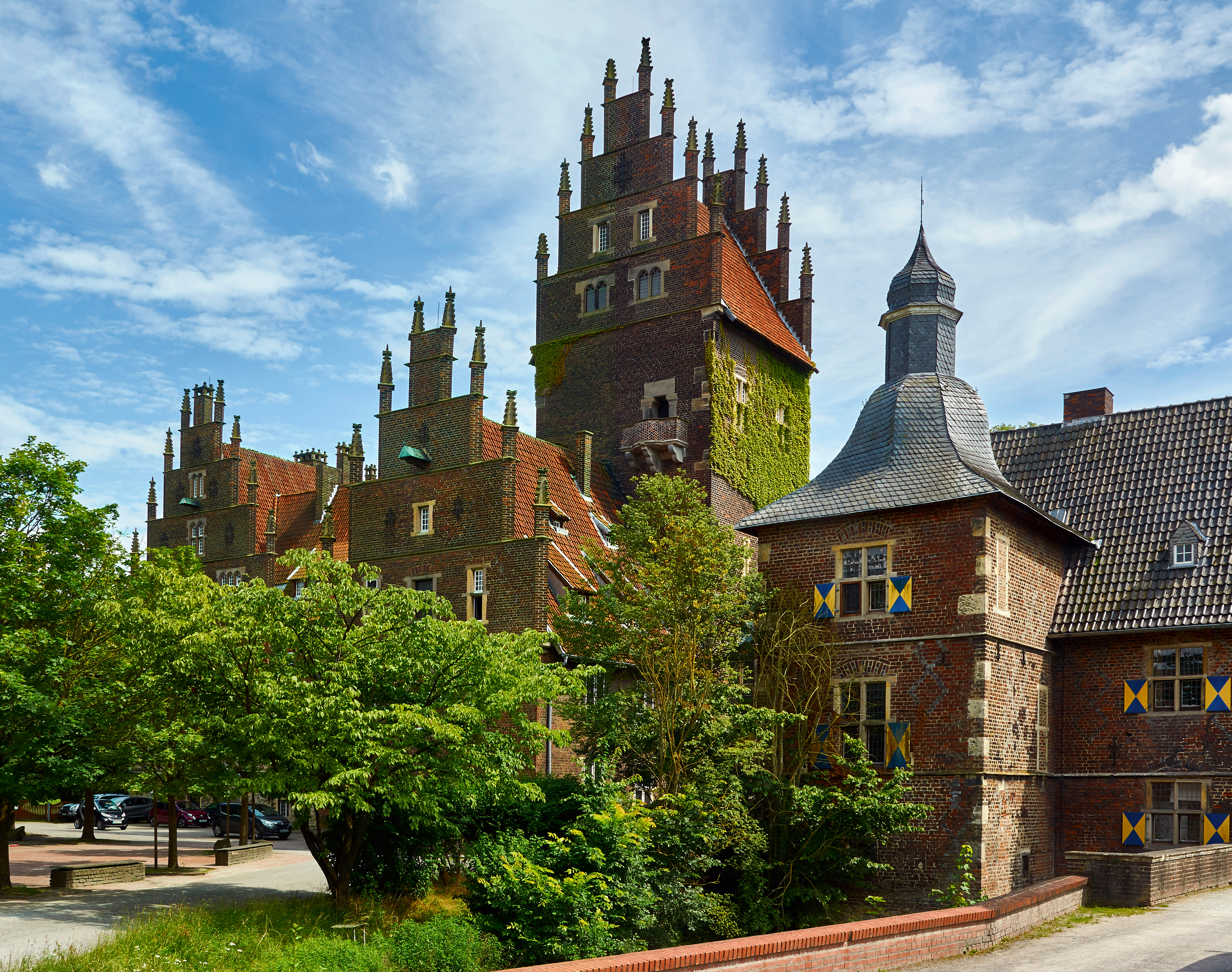
- View over Hamm Hauptbahnhof Sri Kamadchi Ampal Temple Pauluskirche Heessen Castle

- Flag Coat of arms
- Interactive map of Hamm
- Location within Germany Location within North Rhine-Westphalia
- Coordinates: 51°40′53″N 7°49′9″E
- Country: Germany
- State: North Rhine-Westphalia
- Admin. region: Arnsberg
- District: Urban district
- Subdivisions: Hamm-Mitte, Bockum-Hövel, Heessen, Rhynern, Uentrop, Pelkum, Herringen

Government
  - Mayor (2020–25): Marc Herter (SPD)

Area
  - Total: 226.43 km^{2} (87.43 sq mi)
- Elevation: 63 m (207 ft)

Population (2025-12-31)
  - Total: 179,108
  - Density: 791.01/km^{2} (2,048.7/sq mi)
- Time zone: UTC+01:00 (CET)
  - Summer (DST): UTC+02:00 (CEST)
- Postal codes: 59000-59077
- Dialling codes: 02381, 02382, 02383, 02384, 02385, 02388, 02389, 02307
- Vehicle registration: HAM
- Website: www.hamm.de

Hamm (German: [ham]; Latin: Hammona) is a city in North Rhine-Westphalia, Germany. It is located in the northeastern part of the Ruhr area. As of 2016 its population was 179,397. The city is situated between the A1 motorway and A2 motorway. Hamm railway station is an important hub for rail transport and renowned for its distinctive station building.

== History ==
=== Coat of arms ===
The coat of arms has been in use in its present form for about 750 years. It shows the markish chessboard ("märkischen Schachbalken") in red and silver on a golden field. Originally it was the founders' coat of arms, i. e. the Counts of Mark. The chessboard and the colours are often displayed in the coats of arms of further towns founded by that family line. Similarly, the colours of the city are red and white.

=== Overview ===
The name Ham means "corner" in the old Low German dialect spoken at that time. In the old times the name thom Hamme would be used, which evolved slowly into its modern form Hamm. The name derives from the description of the Hamm's location in the corner of the Lippe river and the narrow Ahse affluent, where it was founded on Ash Wednesday in March 1226 by Count Adolf I of the Mark.

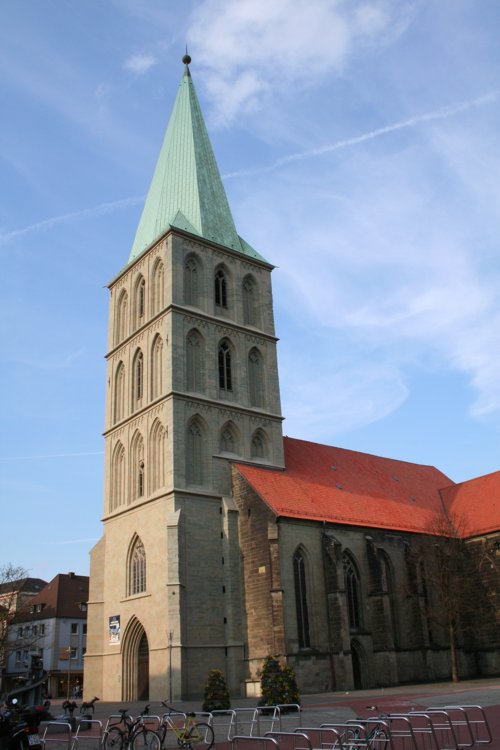
Pauluskirche former St.Georg, main church of Hamm

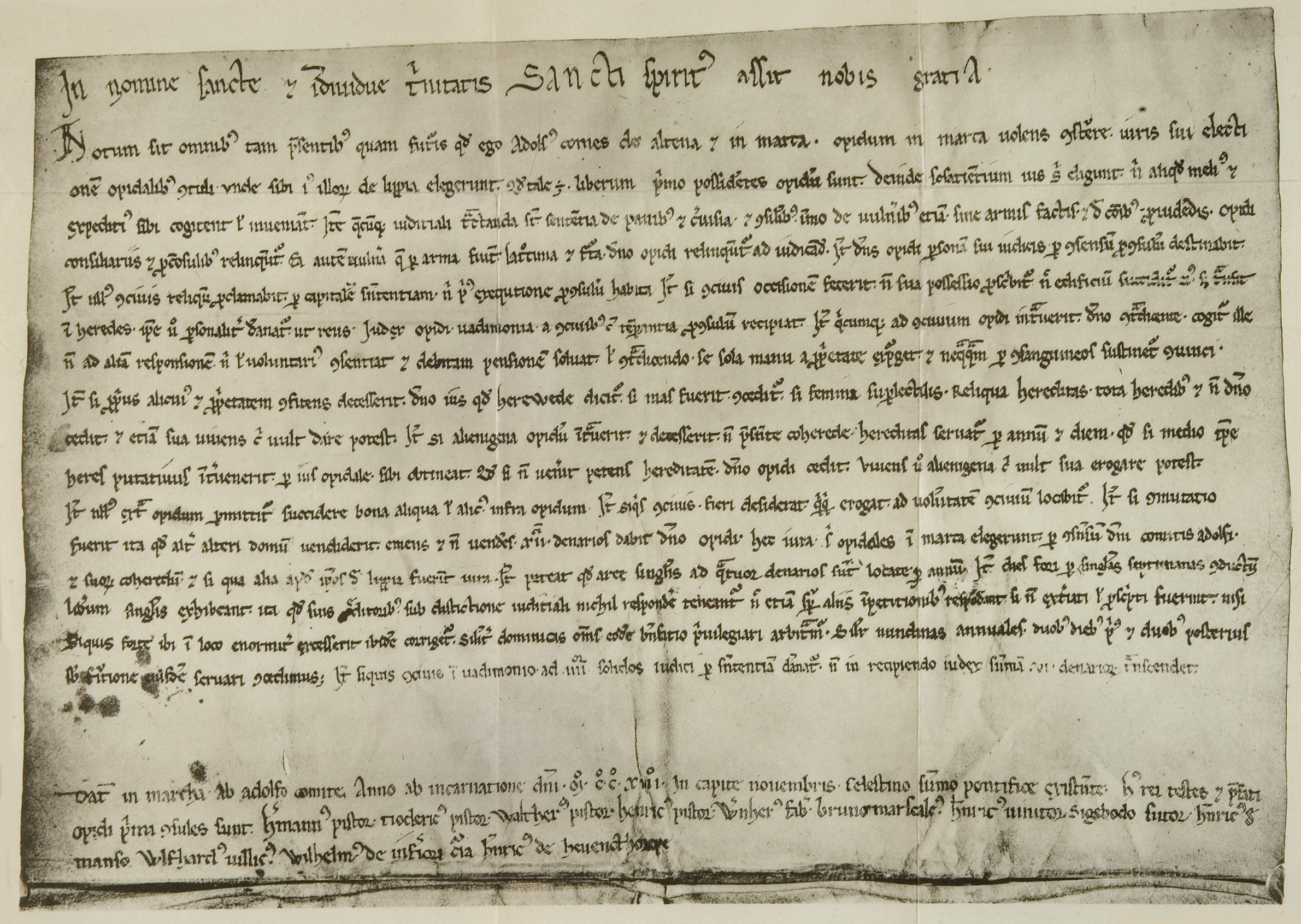
"Gründungsprivileg" Town rights of Hamm

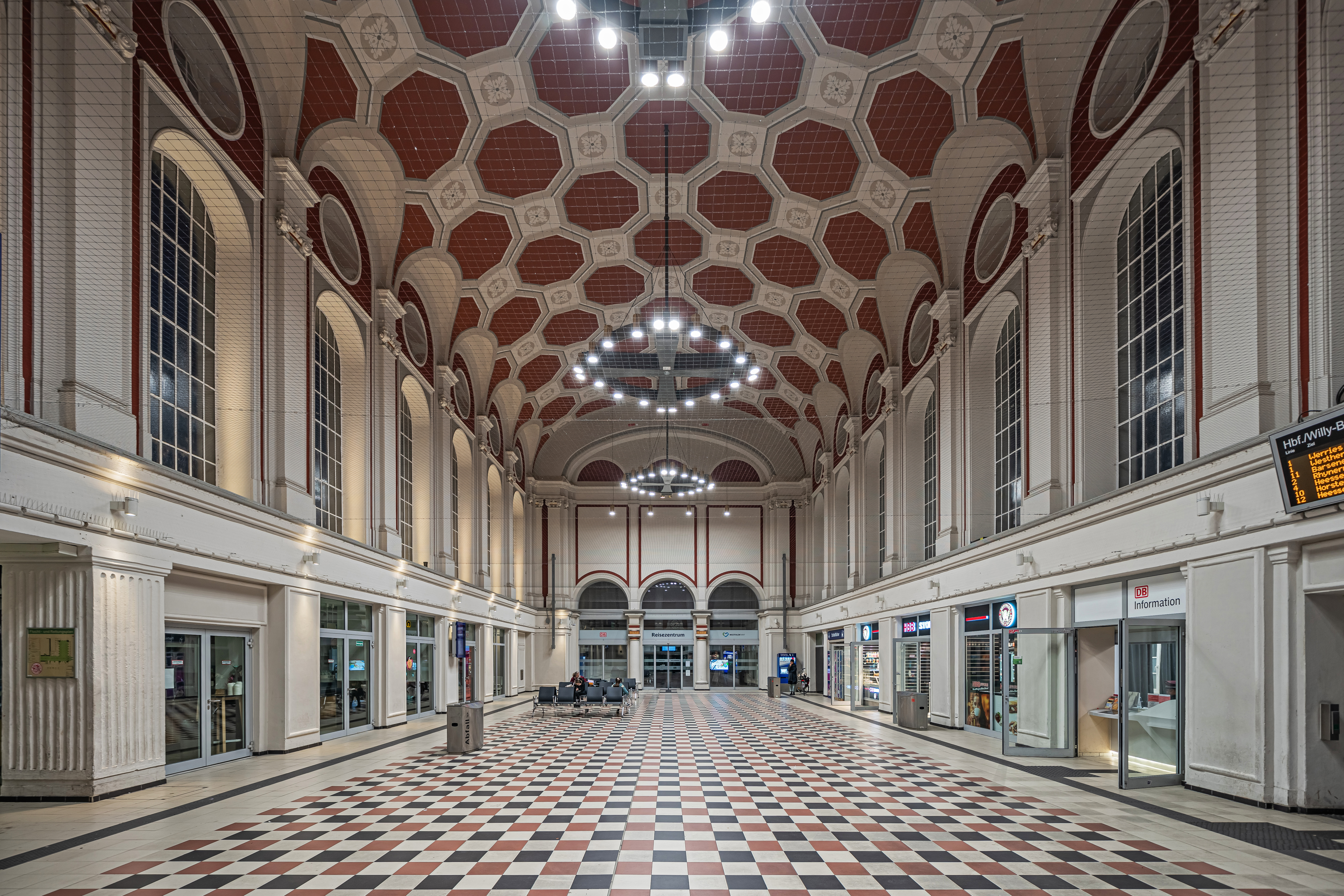
Hamm railway station hall

- 1350 The Black death killed nearly all of the citizens. Only seven families survived.
- 1469 Hamm became a member of the Hanseatic League. It was one of the most powerful towns in the region, while the large cities of the today's Ruhr area still were only tiny villages.
- 1614 The Treaty of Xanten ends the conflict about the heritage of Cleve-Mark, the Electorate Brandenburg (later Prussia) inherited the Ducal Cleve and the counties Ravensburg and Mark (with Hamm)
- 1618-1648 Thirty Years' War, Hamm was taken several times by different armed forces and had to endure changing garrisons. Almost all buildings were destroyed, except for the main church St. Georg (today: Pauluskirche) and St. Agnes church.
- 1657 Establishment of the Gymnasium Illustre (later named Gymnasium Hammonense) with three faculties (theology, jurisprudence and philosophy).
- 1753 Establishment of the regional court (Landgericht)
- 1767 "Märkische Kammerdeputation" established
- 1769 Brewery Isenbeck founded
- 1787 Changing of the "Märkische Kammerdeputation" into the "Märkische Kriegs- und Domänenkammer" by the Prussian "Generaldirektorium".
- 1818 Hamm has 4,688 inhabitants.
- 1820 The regional appeal court moves from Cleve to Hamm.
- 1847 First train stops at the main station Hamm
- 1853 Westfälische Union (later Thyssen Draht AG) was founded
- 1856 Westfälische Draht Industrie was founded (later Klöckner Draht GmbH, today Westfälische Draht Industrie (WDI))
- 1901 30,000 inhabitants, the district Hamm is split up into the urban district of Hamm (City) and the district of Unna.
- 1901 Coal-mine de Wendel in Herringen starts mining (later Heinrich-Robert, now Bergwerk Ost) (first coal output 1904)
- 1902 Coal-mine Maximilian in Werries/Ostwennemar starts mining (first coal output 1907)
- 1905 Coal-mine Radbod in Bockum-Hövel starts mining (first coal output 1905)
- 1912 Coal-mine Sachsen in Heessen starts mining (first coal output 1914)
- 1914 Datteln-Hamm-Canal is completed including the new city port
- 1938 The A2 (motorway) reaches Hamm
- 1939-1945 55 air raids destroy nearly 60% of the old city and leave only a few historical buildings.
- 1944 Coal-mine Maximillian closes after several problems with water drainage of the hole mine (completely flooded in 1914).
- 1945 First meeting of the city council after the war
- 1946 Establishment of the industrial court and the industrial court of appeal by the Allied Control Council.
- 1953 Windsor Boys' School opens for the children on British Service personnel
- 1956 Sport airfield founded in the Lippe meadows.
- 1965 A1 (motorway) reaches Hamm.
- 1976 Coal-mine Sachsen closes
- 1983 Windsor Boys' School closes – View the Virtual Tour of the Windsor School / Windsor Boys School Hamm, Germany

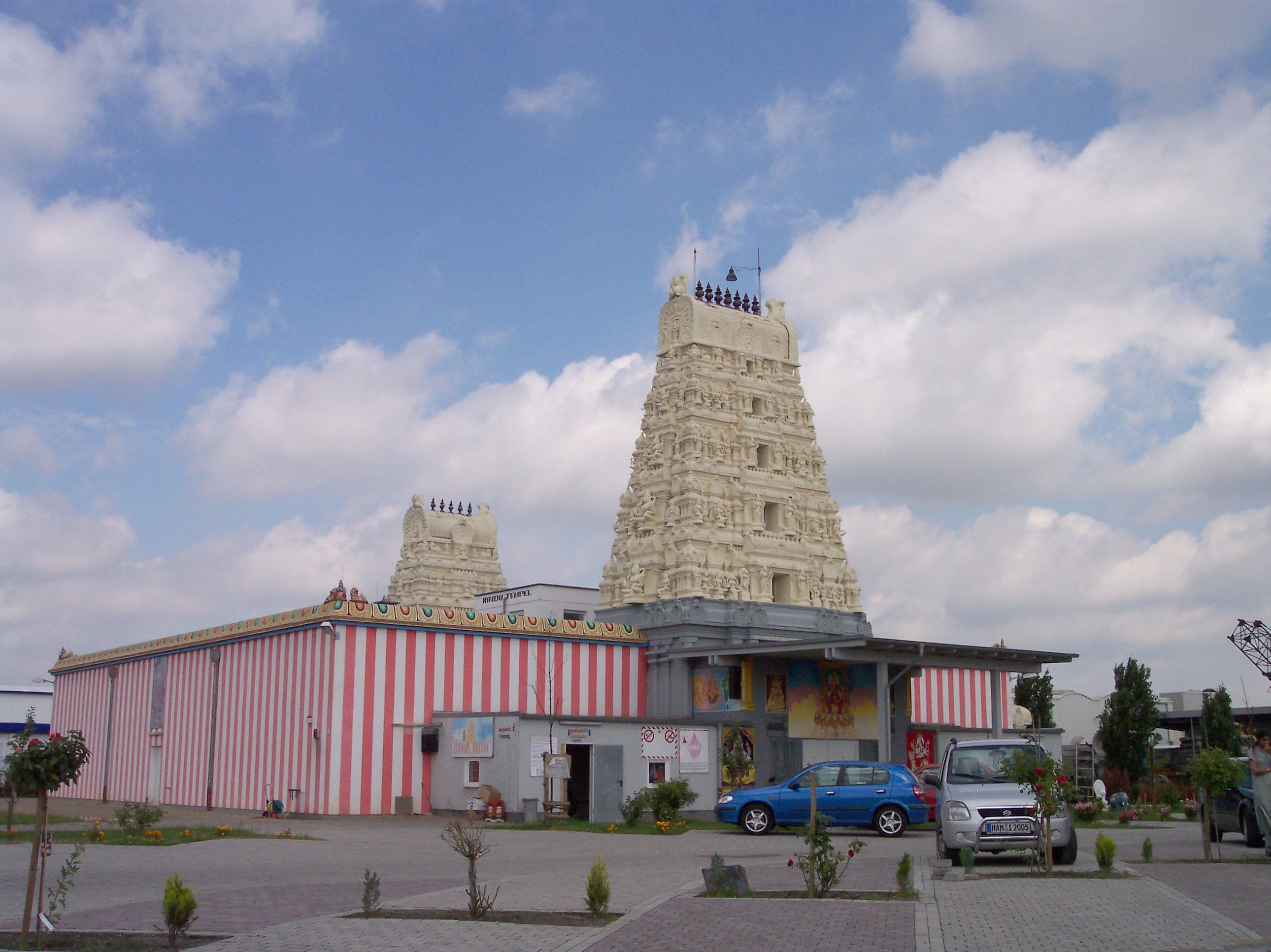
Sri Kamadchi Ampal Temple Hamm

- 1984 First Landesgartenschau (horticultural show of the federal state) of North Rhine-Westphalia is held in Hamm. The old area of the coal-mine Maximillian was used for this purpose. The world largest glass elephant (Glaselefant) is built as the main attraction and until today is one of the major landmarks of the city.
- 1990 Coal-mine Radbod closes.
- 2002 Consecration of the Sri Kamadchi Ampal-Temple
- 2005 Establishment of the university of applied sciences "SRH Fachhochschule Hamm"

=== Population development ===
Until 1833 any population is an approximation, in later times the population was counted or updated by the local government or other institutions of the government.

Historical population

Year	Pop.	±% p.a.
1618	1,000	—
1719	3,250	+1.17%
1798	3,065	−0.07%
1818	4,680	+2.14%
1832	6,272	+2.11%
1861	11,600	+2.14%
1871	16,924	+3.85%
1875	18,877	+2.77%
1880	20,800	+1.96%
1885	22,523	+1.60%
1890	24,969	+2.08%
1895	28,589	+2.74%
1900	31,371	+1.87%
1905	38,429	+4.14%
1910	43,663	+2.59%
1916	40,776	−1.13%
1919	45,756	+3.92%
1925	49,777	+1.41%
1933	53,532	+0.91%

Year	Pop.	±% p.a.
1939	59,035	+1.64%
1945	50,971	−2.42%
1946	49,751	−2.39%
1950	59,866	+4.74%
1956	66,327	+1.72%
1961	70,641	+1.27%
1965	166,152	+23.84%
1970	170,265	+0.49%
1975	172,212	+0.23%
1980	171,878	−0.04%
1985	166,389	−0.65%
1990	179,639	+1.54%
1995	183,408	+0.42%
2000	182,427	−0.11%
2005	184,239	+0.20%
2010	181,783	−0.27%
2015	179,397	−0.26%
2020	178,967	−0.05%
2025	179,108	+0.02%

Source: Landesdatabank Nordrhein-Westfalen (1965-2025)

Significant minority groups
Nationality	Population (2022)
Turkey	9,309
Poland	3,255
Bulgaria	2,034
Ukraine	1,927
Syria	1,744
Serbia	1,563
Romania	1,143
Iraq	871
Morocco	795
Croatia	743
Italy	631
Russia	583
Afghanistan	504
Sri Lanka	386
Hungary	313

== Politics and structure ==
=== Mayor ===
The current Lord Mayor (Oberbürgermeister) of Hamm is Marc Herter of the Social Democratic Party (SPD) since 2020. The Mayor is directly elected for a five-year term. Prior to the 1999 local administration reform in North Rhine-Westphalia, the Oberstadtdirektor was the chief executive of the city, and was chosen by the city council.

The most recent mayoral election was held on 14 September 2025, and the results were as follows:

Candidate	Party		
Candidate	Party	Votes	%
Marc Herter	Social Democratic Party	45,309	63.6
Jochen Dornseifer	Christian Democratic Union	12,111	17.0
Pierre Jung	Alternative for Germany	9,697	13.6
Erol Gürle	WGR	2,028	2.8
Christopher Bürger	BSW	1,089	1.5
Ingo Müller	Free Democratic Party	1,045	1.5
Valid votes		71,279	99.5
Invalid votes		387	0.5
Total		71,666	100.0
Electorate/voter turnout		133,226	53.8
Source: State Returning Officer

=== City council ===
Results of the 2020 city council election

The Hamm city council governs the city alongside the Mayor. The most recent city council election was held on 13 September 2020, and the results were as follows:

Party	Votes	%	+/-	Seats	+/-
Social Democratic Party (SPD)	25,992	37.1	▲2.0	22	▲2
Christian Democratic Union (CDU)	23,385	33.4	▼9.2	19	▼6
Alliance 90/The Greens (Grüne)	8,925	12.7	▲5.5	7	▲3
Free Democratic Party (FDP)	3,575	5.1	▲1.0	3	▲1
Alternative for Germany (AfD)	3,274	4.7	▲4.0	3	▲3
Pro Hamm (WG Pro)	2,555	3.6	▲0.8	2	±0
The Left (Die Linke)	2,068	2.9	▼1.4	2	▼1
The Right (Die Rechte)	213	0.3	▼0.6	0	▼1
Free Voters (FW)	122	0.2	▼0.2	0	±0
Valid votes	70,109	98.4			
Invalid votes	1,163	1.6			
Total	71,272	100.0		58	±0
Electorate/voter turnout	136,561	52.2	▲0.7		
Source: State Returning Officer

=== Incorporations ===
In 1939, 1968 and 1975 Hamm incorporated several towns and municipalities: in 1939 the village Mark (which the Counts and the county took the name of) and in 1968 the villages of Berge and Westtünnen. In the reorganisation of 1975, the following towns and municipalities were incorporated into the City of Hamm:

1. The town of Bockum-Hövel, Lüdinghausen district
2. The town of Heessen, Beckum district
3. The municipality of Uentrop, Unna district, formed in 1968, including the municipalities of Braam-Ostwennemar, Frielinghausen, Haaren, Norddinker, Schmehausen, Uentrop, Vöckinghausen and Werries
4. The municipality of Rhynern, (Unna district, without Hilbeck incorporated by Werl), formed in 1968, including the municipalities of Allen, Freiske, Hilbeck, Osterflierich, Osttünnen, Rhynern, Süddinker and Wambeln
5. The municipality of Pelkum, (Unna district), formed in 1968, including the municipalities of Herringen, Lerche, Pelkum, Sandbochum, Weetfeld and parts of Wiescherhöfen.

The number of citizens more than doubles from 83.000 in 1974 to 173.000 in 1975.

=== City structure ===
Ascheberg^{1}

Drensteinfurt^{2}

Ahlen^{2}

Lippetal^{3}

Werne^{4}

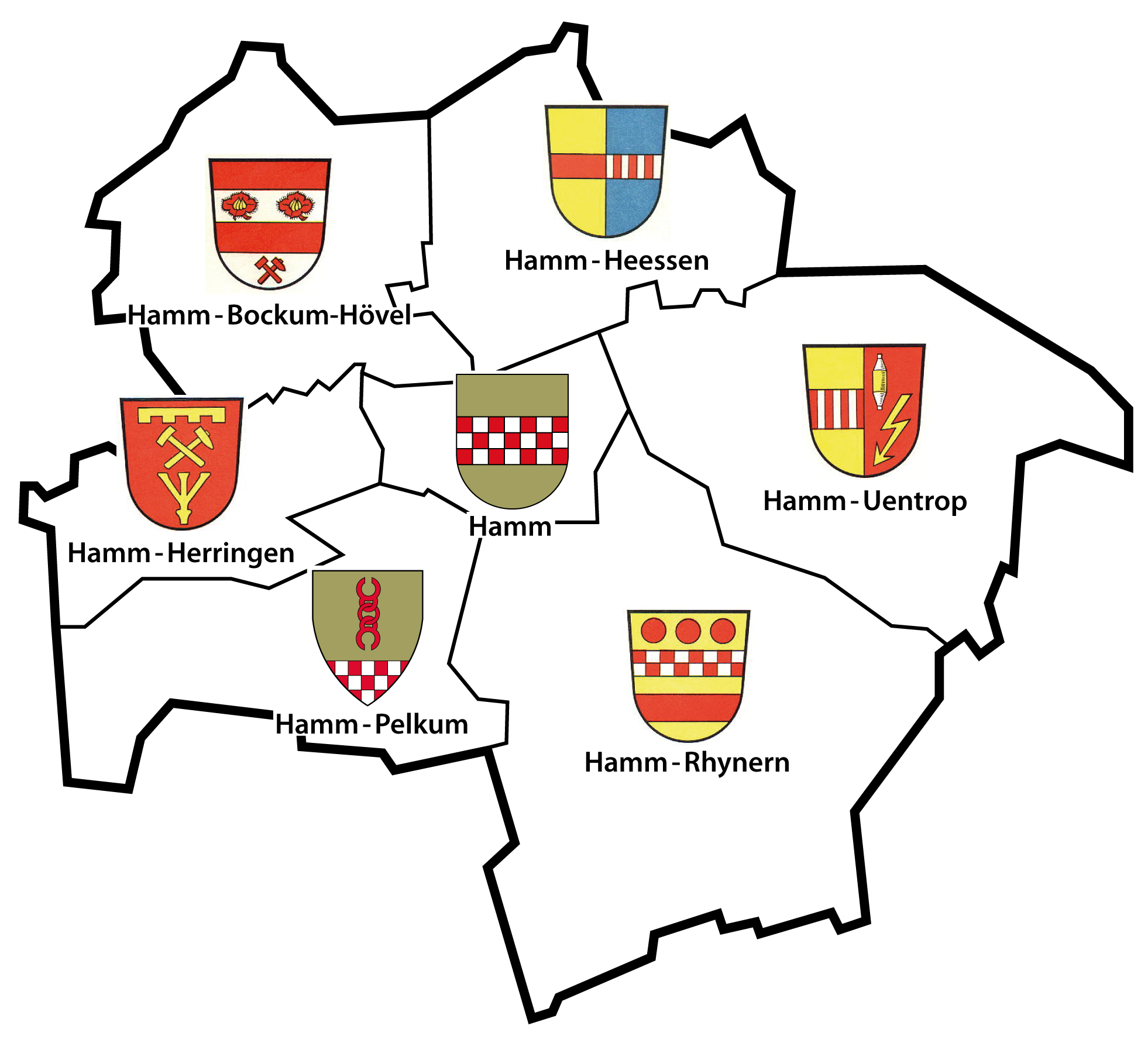

Hamm
(Map of Hamm's quarters)

Welver^{3}

Bergkamen^{4}

Kamen^{4}

Bönen^{4}

Unna^{4}
1 District Coesfeld
2 District Warendorf
3 District Soest
4 District Unna

Hamm has seven quarters (Stadtbezirk), each divided into residential areas like City, which actually means the center of the city around the Pauluschurch or like Hövel-Radbod near the former entrance to the coalmine Radbod in the quarter Bockum-Hövel. The following table shows the situation in 2006. Every quarter is named with the prefix Hamm, like Hamm-Bockum-Hövel or Hamm-Mitte.

Quarter / Stadtbezirk	Pop.	Pop. density		Area	
Quarter / Stadtbezirk	Pop.	/km^{2}	/sq mi	km^{2}	sq mi
Bockum-Hövel	35,468	1,086	2,810	32.66	12.61
Heessen	23,639	809	2,100	29.23	11.29
Herringen	21,077	1,088	2,820	19.38	7.48
Mitte	34,407	3,154	8,170	10.91	4.21
Pelkum	18,974	628	1,630	30.21	11.66
Rhynern	18,648	315	820	59.23	22.87
Uentrop	28,122	630	1,600	44.62	17.23
Total	180.355	797	2,060	226.25	87.36

The former town Bockum-Hövel today forms the quarter with the largest number of inhabitants, closely followed by the centre of the city Hamm-Mitte. The latter is the smallest quarter by metric size.

== Twin towns – sister cities ==
Hamm is twinned with:

- Neufchâteau, France (1967)
- Santa Monica, United States (1969)
- Bradford, England, UK (1976)
- Chattanooga, United States (1977)
- Mazatlán, Mexico (1978)
- Toul, France (1987)
- Oranienburg, Germany (1990)
- Kalisz, Poland (1991)
- Afyonkarahisar, Turkey (2006)

== Miscellaneous ==
In 2006 Hamm was the first city to accomplish a "Ratsbürgerentscheid" (literally: "council's citizens decision"). Subject of the plebiscite was a plan to build a 43 ha city lake (2007–2010) near the city centre. 136,521 citizens were entitled to vote, 57,563 used that possibility and 56.9% refused their approbation for the project. As minimal vote 20% (of the total 136,521 voters) had to decide between one of the possibilities (20% for Yes or 20% for NO). The city council accepted the voting and stopped the plans. This procedure is planned for future projects in NRW. Also in Hamm established was the "Baugerichtstag e. V." a society organizing a congress about the German building law. The congress is held in a two years term.

== Health ==
The largest health facility is the Marien Hospital with its two separate buildings, Marien Hospital I the old building within the centre of the city and Marien Hospital II together 587 beds. Then there is the (EVK Hamm) Evangelisches Krankenhaus Hamm (Protestant Hospital) combined with the children's hospital south of the centre together 493 beds, the St. Barbara Klinik (Clinic) in Heessen with 422 beds and the Malteser Krankenhaus (Hospital) St. Josef in Bockum-Hövel with 260 beds. Additional there are the Klinik für manuelle Therapie (Clinic for manual therapy) within the quarter Bad Hamm (138 beds), the spa district. The Westfälisches Institut Hamm für Kinder- und Jugendpsychiatrie und psychotherapie (Westphalian Institute Hamm for Children's- and Youth psychiatry and psychotherapy) as an Institute of the federal state (158 beds) and the private Klinik (clinic) am Bärenbrunnen. (All Hospitals together have 2058 beds.) Former Hospitals are:

- The BWK Bundeswehrkrankenhaus Hamm (Hospital of the Federal Defence Forces) closed in 2007 after a reform of the German forces
- Knappschaftskrankenhaus (Hospital operated by the health fund for miners (Bundesknappschaft) now Marien Hospital II)
- Märkische Kinderklinik (Children's Hospital combined with the Elisabeth Kinderklinik and now part of the EVK Hamm as "Klinik für Kinder- und Jugendmedizin")
- St. Elisabeth Kinderklinik (Children's Hospital combined with the Märkische Kinderklinik and now part of the EVK Hamm as "Klinik für Kinder- und Jugendmedizin")

== Education ==
Hamm has six Gymnasien (grammar schools), two comprehensive schools and several Realschulen, Hauptschulen and Grundschulen (elementary schools). The oldest Gymnasium in Hamm is the Gymnasium Hammonense which was established as academic school (small university) with three faculties in 1657. The school declined in its importance and in 1781 merged with the local Latin school and got reformed by Prussia. The new combined school was humanist Gymnasium. In 1867 the "Märkisches Gymnasium" followed as the second Gymnasium of Hamm, in 1902 the "Freiherr vom Stein Gymnasium", in 1924 the "Beisenkamp Gymnasium" – first as "Oberlyceum" (Gymnasium for girls) – and in 1968 the "Galilei-Gymnasium" was established as an offspring of the Gymnasium Hammonense. Additionally in Schloss Heessen there is a private school including the Gymnasium. Both comprehensive schools in Hamm are younger foundations by the city during school reforms of NRW. Hamm is also well known for its many vocational schools:

- "Eduard Spranger Berufskolleg für Technik" a vocational school for mostly industrial jobs
- "Elisabeth Lüders Berufskolleg für Sozialwesen, Gesundheit, Hauswirtschaft und Kinderpflege" a vocational school for social welfare, health, home economics and child care, and several other schools.
- "Friederich List Berufskolleg für Wirtschaft" a trade and economical school

In 2005 a small private university of applied sciences was established, the "SRH Fachhoschule Hamm". The private university of applied sciences started with two study programs ending with degrees of Bachelor and Master of Science for logistic engineering. The "Klinik für Psychatrie und Psychotherapie of the Marienhospital" cooperates with Witten/Herdecke University in education and science. During the summer 2009 another university of applied sciences was founded by the federal state NRW, named Hamm-Lippstadt University of Applied Sciences. The university is divided in two departments, each with its own small Campus area, one in Hamm and another in Lippstadt.

== Industry and economy ==
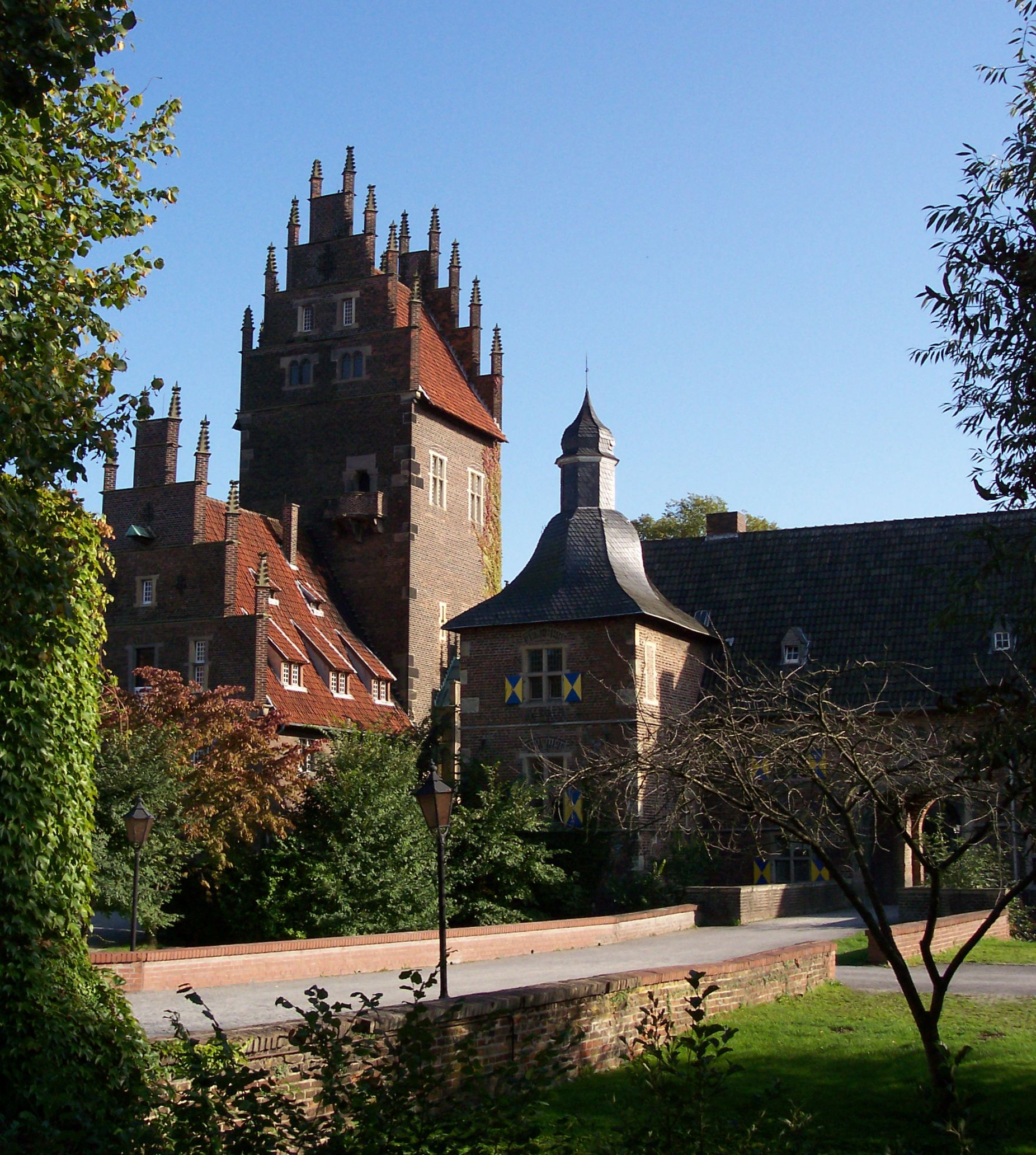
Schloss Heessen

Major industrial branches are the coal-mining industry, steel industry, chemical industry and the car component supplier industry. In the last century there were four coal-mines within the urban district. Today the Bergwerk Ost in Herringen is the last operating coal mine with about 3,000 employees. Mannesmann Hoesch Präzisrohr, Westfälische Draht Industrie (WDI) and Böhler Thyssen Welding are the major representatives of the steel industry, the chemical industry is represented by DuPont in Uentrop and the car supplier industry by Hella KGaA Hueck & Co. factory 4 in Bockum-Hövel with about 1000 employees. The energy industry is represented by a RWE coal power plant and a further power plant (Trianel) in Uentrop. A new coal power plant is currently under construction. The THTR-300, also in Uentrop-Schmehhausen, was decommissioned in 1989. Alongside the A2, in the southern part of the urban district, a new business park inhabits the growing logistics business. Hamm is also known as "City of Law" (Stadt des Rechts) because of the greatest German regional appeal court (Oberlandesgericht), the local court (Amtsgericht), the industrial court (Arbeitgericht) and the industrial appeal court (Landesarbeitsgericht). The Chamber of Notaries and bar association of the regional appeal court Hamm and the courts are of greater influence on the appearance of the city. Several hospitals in the urban district are also important employers, for example the EVK Hamm has about 1000 employees.

=== Media ===
The only daily newspaper of Hamm printed there, is the Westfälischer Anzeiger. At first, a weekly newspaper in Hamm was the Kreis Hammsches Wochenblatt founded by Heinich Jakob Grote in 1822. Its name was changed in 1848 to Westfälischer Anzeiger. A second newspaper appeared, founded by the Thiemann family, the Westfälische Kurier. Both co-existed until the end of the Second World War. After the War both newspapers were combined and named Westfälischer Anzeiger und Kurier. In the 1960s another name-change made the Westfälischer Anzeiger. This newspaper is the mantle of several smaller regional newspapers; together, they had a total 153,428 copies in 2004. In the 1970s the Westdeutsche Allgemeine Zeitung unsuccessfully tried to establish its own daily newspaper.

Two weekly newspapers appear in Hamm: the Stadtanzeiger from the Westfälischer Anzeiger with a total of 384.000 copies, and the Sonntags-Rundblick by a medium-sized local company.

Since 1990 the local radio station "Radio Lippewelle Hamm" is on air and number one radio station of the local radios in NRW. On 3 October 1993 the "Offener Kanal Hamm" started broadcasting; it is a small TV project by people for the people, started through the federal state.

== Culture ==
The Waldbühne Hamm-Heessen is one of the most active open-air theatres in Germany. The Alfred Fischer Hall is a multi-purpose event location in Heessen in a former machinery hall built by Alfred Fischer in 1912. The Städtische Musikschule Hamm is one of the oldest music schools in Germany. Hamm also has several active choirs and a jazz club and has been the home of many bands.

== Transport ==
=== Roads ===
Hamm is linked to three motorways: the Bundesautobahn 1 (BAB 1 or A1, Puttgarden-Saarbrücken) named Hansaline with two connections (81 and 82), the (BAB 2 or A2, Oberhausen-Berlin) with three connections (17, 18 and 19) and the A445 (Hamm-Arnsberg) which is connected by the B63 until the planned construction between Hamm and Werl is completed. The Kamener Kreuz is situated in the southwest of Hamm. Two federal routes (Bundesstrassen) the B61 and B63 intersect in the city centre. Several state roads (Landesstrassen) connect Hamm with its neighbouring towns and municipalities.

=== Railways ===
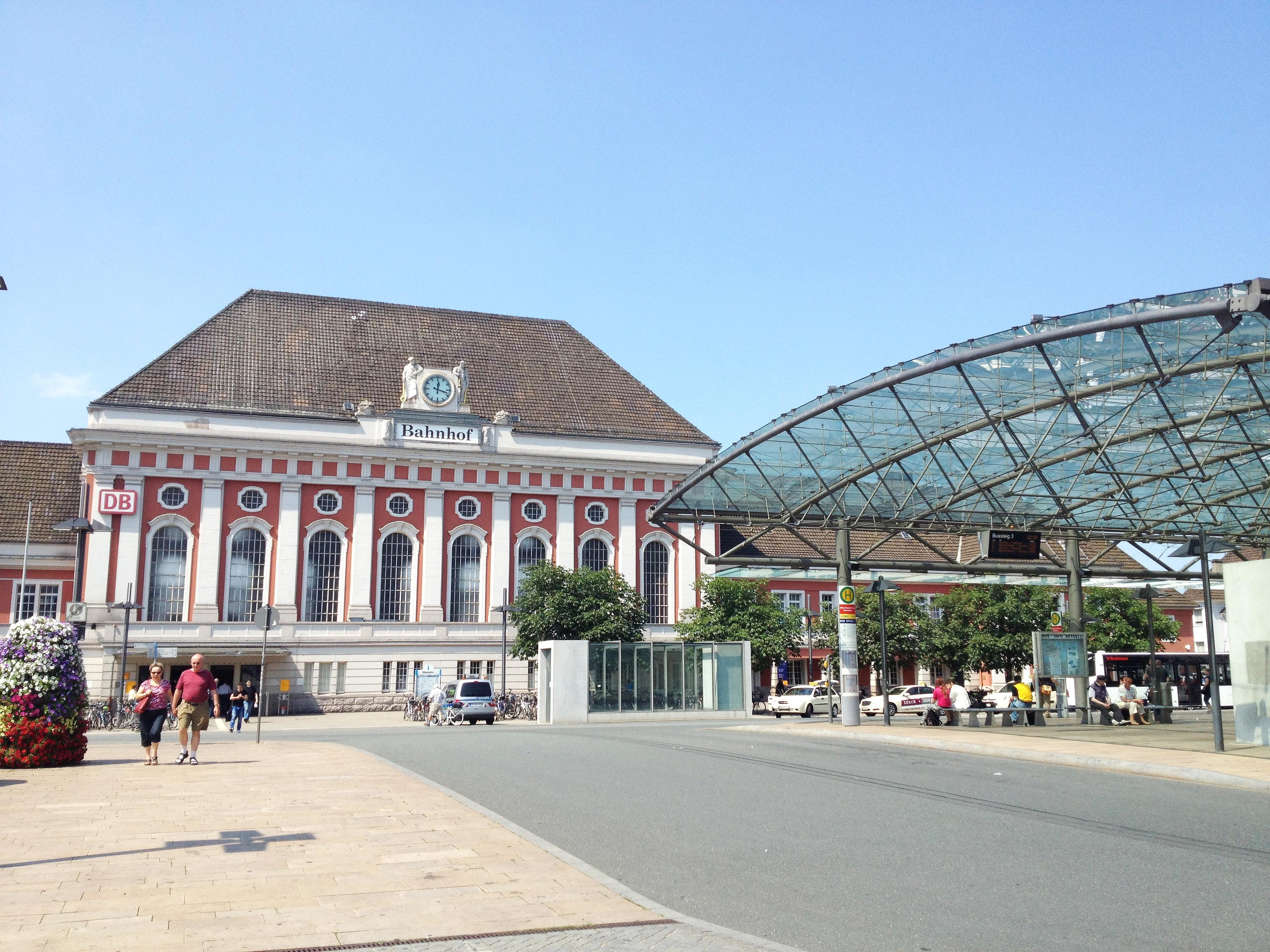
Hamm central station

Hamm has three stations, the main railway station Hamm (Westfalen) and two minor stations, one in Bockum-Hövel and the other one in Heessen. The main station is one of the biggest railway hubs in Germany, and connected with one of the largest marshalling yards in Europe, the latter now only partly operating. Notable is the railway station for its Art Deco Gründerzeit inspired building styles. Hamm has been connected to the rail since 2 May 1847. Its huge railroad yard—Europe's biggest at the time—was bombed repeatedly during World War II, as was the city itself (in December 1944 it was hit by eleven raids on one day).

=== Buses ===
The city bus network in Hamm is served by the Stadtwerke Hamm, with 65 buses, and the Verkehrsgesellschaft Breitenbach. A regional bus service is served by different companies and both nets serve the central bus station, which is situated in front of the main railway station in the centre of Hamm. Hamm is part of the Verkehrsgemeinschaft Ruhr-Lippe. About 12 million people use the bus network every year, transported on 50 bus lines with 500 bus stops within the city.

=== Canal network ===
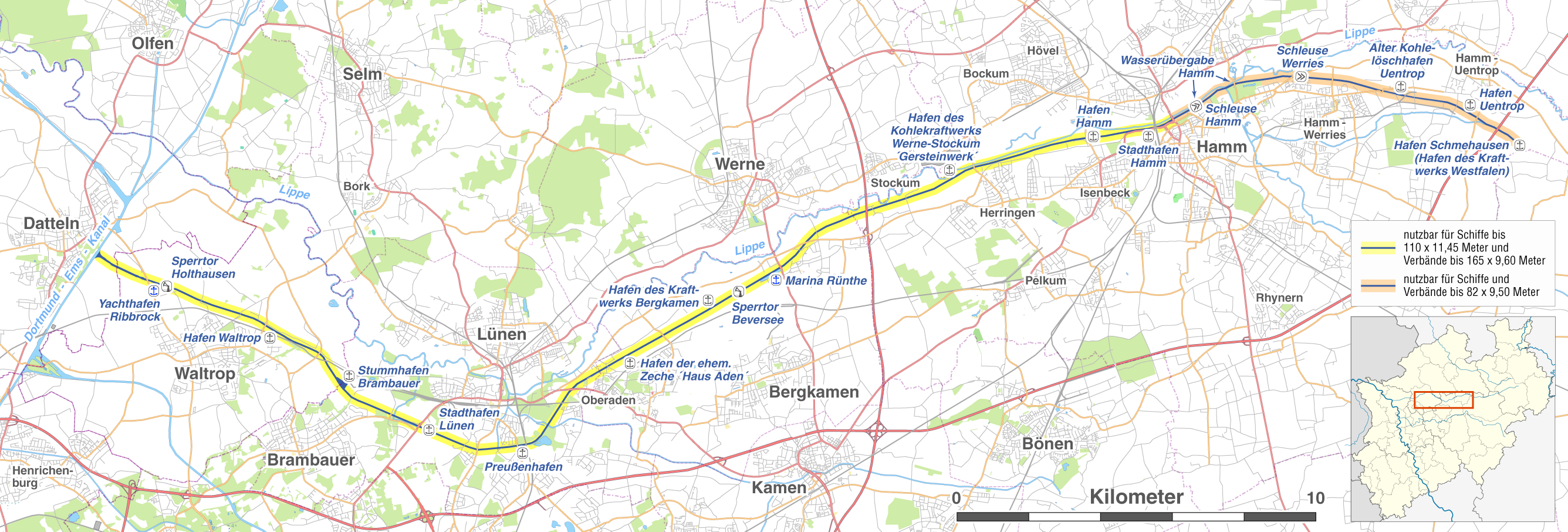
Datteln-Hamm-Kanal

Hamm is the end of the Datteln-Hamm-Kanal; three ports are situated in the urban district: the city port, the canal end port of Uentrop, and the port of Gersteinwerk. The ports of Hamm are the second biggest canal port by freight transact, 1.4 million tons a year by ships and 0.5 million tons by train. The city port allows for ships up to 110 metres length 11.45 meters width and 2.7 metres draft. It is linked with the railway by a track to the near main railway station and the marshaling yard.

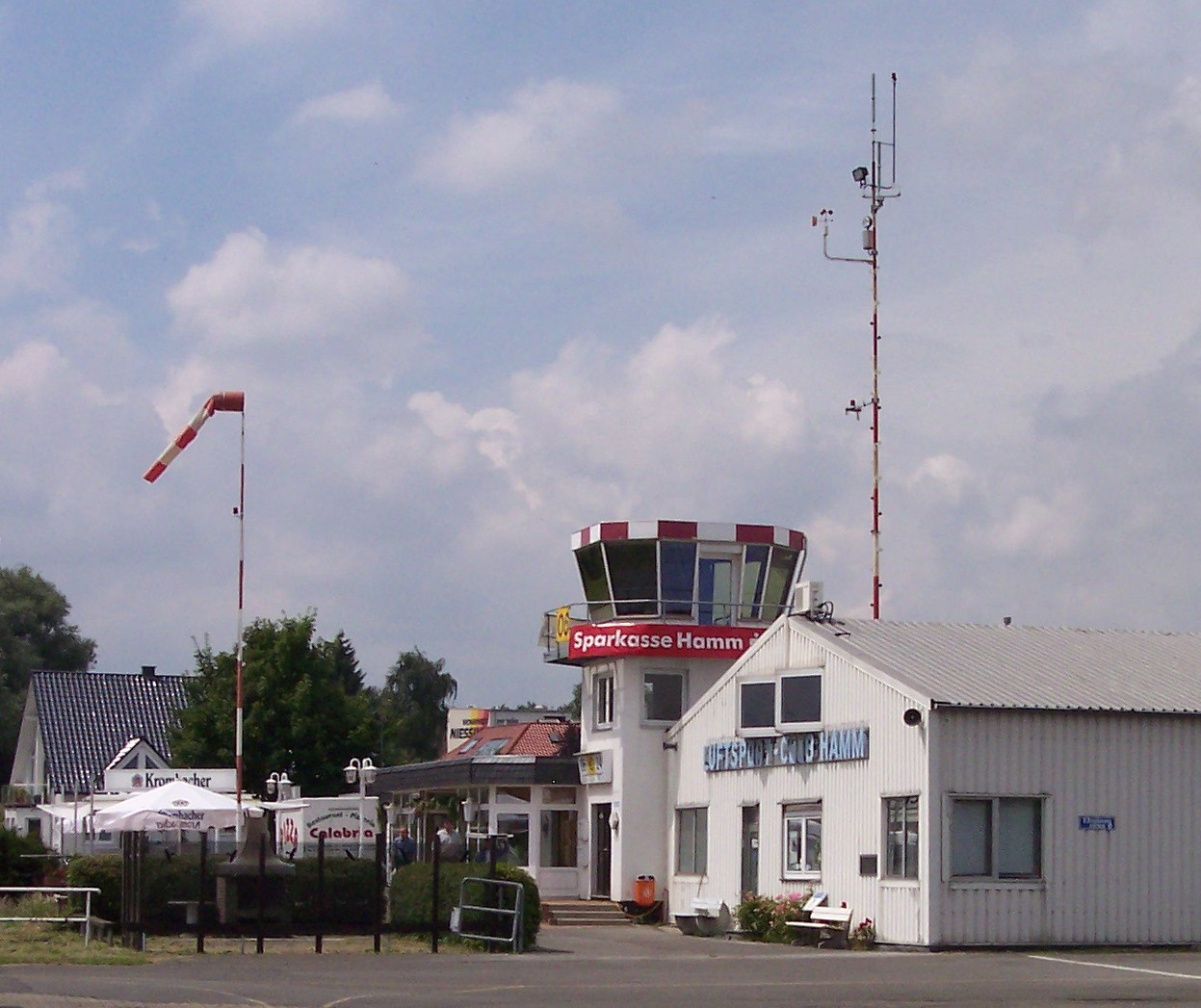
Hamm light airfield

=== Airports ===
Near the city centre, in the meadows by the River Lippe, the Hamm sport airfield is situated. Its runway is 900 m long and 30 m wide. The airfield is operated by the Luftsportclub Hamm e.V. Hamm is situated in the middle of a triangle of three smaller international airports, in the north the Münster Osnabrück Airport (FMO), in the south-west Dortmund Airport and in the east Paderborn Lippstadt Airport. The nearest large international airport is Düsseldorf Airport.

== Notable people ==
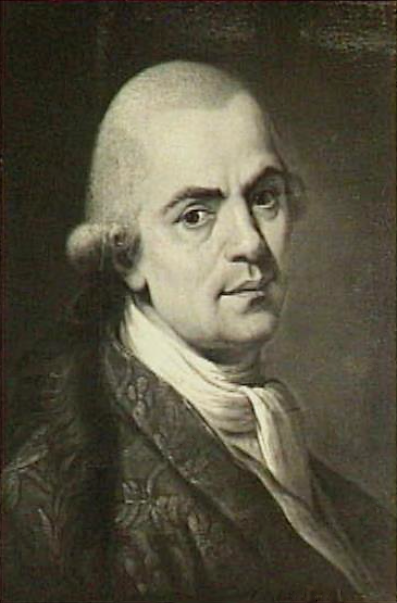
Hendrik Willem Schweickhardt, 1770s

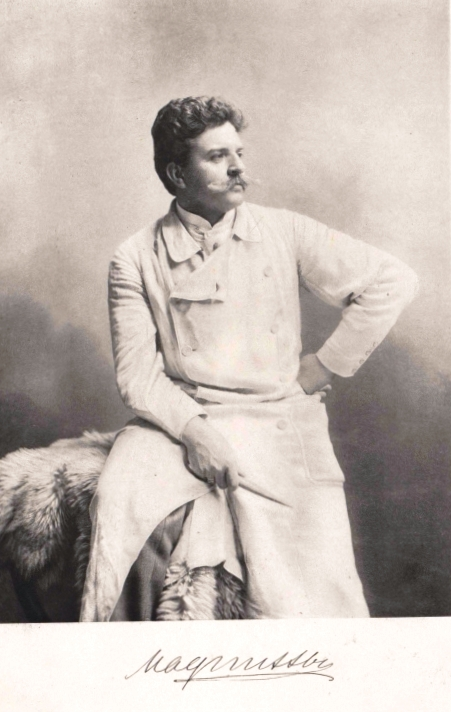
Harro Magnussen, 1901

- Hendrik Willem Schweickhardt (1747–1797), painter.
- Karl von Bodelschwingh-Velmede (1800–1873), a Prussian politician.
- Fred. "Fritz" Schmitz (1820–1905), farmer, musician and member of the Wisconsin State Assembly
- Friedrich Kapp (1824–1884), German-American attorney, author and politician
- Karl Hopf (1832–1873), German historian and Byzantinist
- Harro Magnussen (1861–1908), sculptor
- Wilhelmine Lohmann (1872-?), teacher, social worker, and temperance leader
- Hans Siemsen (1891–1969), journalist and author
- Hubertus Strughold (1898–1986), physiologist, war criminal and prominent medical researcher
- Gerd Bucerius (1906–1995), publisher of Die Zeit from 1959.
- Ludwig Biermann (1907–1986), astronomer
- Jean Berger (1909–2002), pianist and composer
- Heinz Wallberg (1923–2004), conductor
- Hanns Joachim Friedrichs (1927–1995), TV-Journalist and moderator
- Friedrich Hirzebruch (1927–2012), mathematician, founder and first director of the Max Planck Institute for Mathematics in Bonn
- Almuth Lütkenhaus (1930–1996), sculptor and visual artist
- Werner Brinkmann (born 1946), jurist, director of Stiftung Warentest between 1995 – 2011
- Klaus J. Behrendt (born in 1960), actor starred in "Tatort"
- Ursula Neugebauer (born 1960), artist
- Uwe Kröger (born 1964), musical actor
- Richard Klophaus (born 1965), economist
- İsmail YK (born 1978), musician and singer
- Selma Ergeç (born 1978), Turkish-German actress and model
- Giant Rooks, (founded 2014) a German indie rock band from Hamm.

=== Sport ===
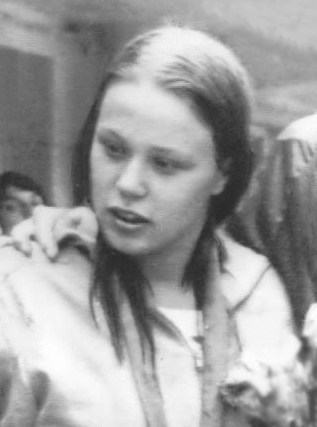
Jutta Weber, 1973

- Bernard Dietz (born 1948), footballer, captain of the West Germany national football team
- Horst Hrubesch (born 1951), retired footballer
- Josef Kaczor (born 1953), footballer, nicknamed "Jupp"
- Jutta Weber (born 1954), swimmer, bronze and silver medallist at the 1972 & 1976 Summer Olympics
- Michael Lusch (born 1964), footballer and football coach
- Christian Vinck (born 1975), former tennis player
- Anna Bornhoff (born 1981), footballer
- Mike Hanke (born 1983), retired footballer who last played for Guizhou Renhe
- Gina-Maria Adenauer (born 1985), racing driver
- Kevin Mirocha (born 1991), Polish-German racing driver
- Sjoeke Nüsken (born 2001), footballer for the Germany national team
- Jan-Niklas Beste (born 1999), footballer for SC Freiburg

== Freemen ==
The city of Hamm has made since 1945 the following people freemen:

- 1946: Josef Schlichter
- 1953: Hugo Bröcker
- 1954: Josef Weidekamp
- 1959: Peter Röttgen
- 1959: Ferdinand Poggel
- 1965: Heinrich Luhmann
- 1971: Gerhard Krampe
- 1990: Werner Figgen
- 1990: Günter Rinsche
- 1994: Felix Ziethmann
