= Alfred Fischer Hall =

Multi-purpose event venue in Germany

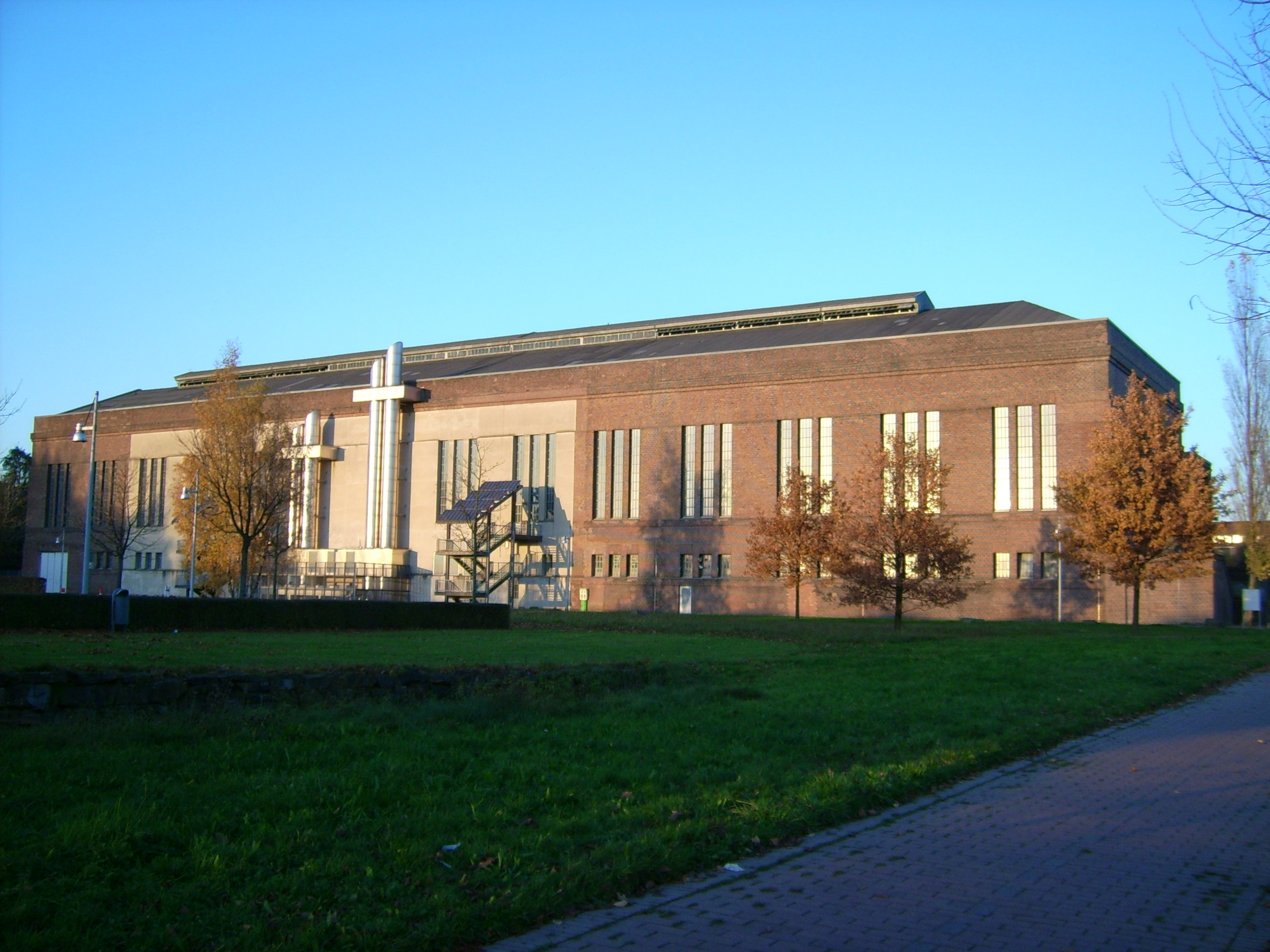
- The hall from the parking area across the street
- Interactive map of Alfred Fischer Hall
- Former names: Maschinenhalle Zeche Sachsen
- Location: Sachsenweg 10, 59073 Hamm, North Rhine-Westphalia, Germany
- Coordinates: 51°42′21″N 7°49′23″E

Construction
- Opened: 1914
- Renovated: 1990s
- Architect: Alfred Fischer

Website
- www.alfred-fischer-halle.de

The Alfred Fischer Hall (Alfred-Fischer-Halle) is a multi-purpose event venue in Hamm, Germany. It was built after design by Alfred Fischer as the machinery hall of a coal mine in 1912. After the mine was closed in 1976, the hall was transformed into a venue for conventions and concerts, among others. It has been a listed historic monument from 1989.

== History ==
The building which now houses the Alfred Fischer Hall was originally built by architect Alfred Fischer as the machinery hall of the coal mine Zeche Sachsen in Heessen (now part of Hamm). The mine, part of the Ruhr district, was founded in 1912, with the hall completed in 1914. The mine was one of the deepest in the district which made production expensive. It was considered to be closed in 1932, but the project faced protest. It was finally closed in 1976.

== Building ==
The complete complex was designed by Fischer who gave the hall classicist features, and influenced by Bauhaus architecture. It is built in the style of Brick Expressionism. The entrance was designed with stairs comparable to a temple. A motto in the entrance façade says "Kohle ist Leben!" (Coal means life!). The hall has been called "schönste Industriehalle Deutschlands" (most beautiful industrial hall of Germany) and "Kathedrale der Industriekultur" (cathedral of industry culture).

== Event venue ==
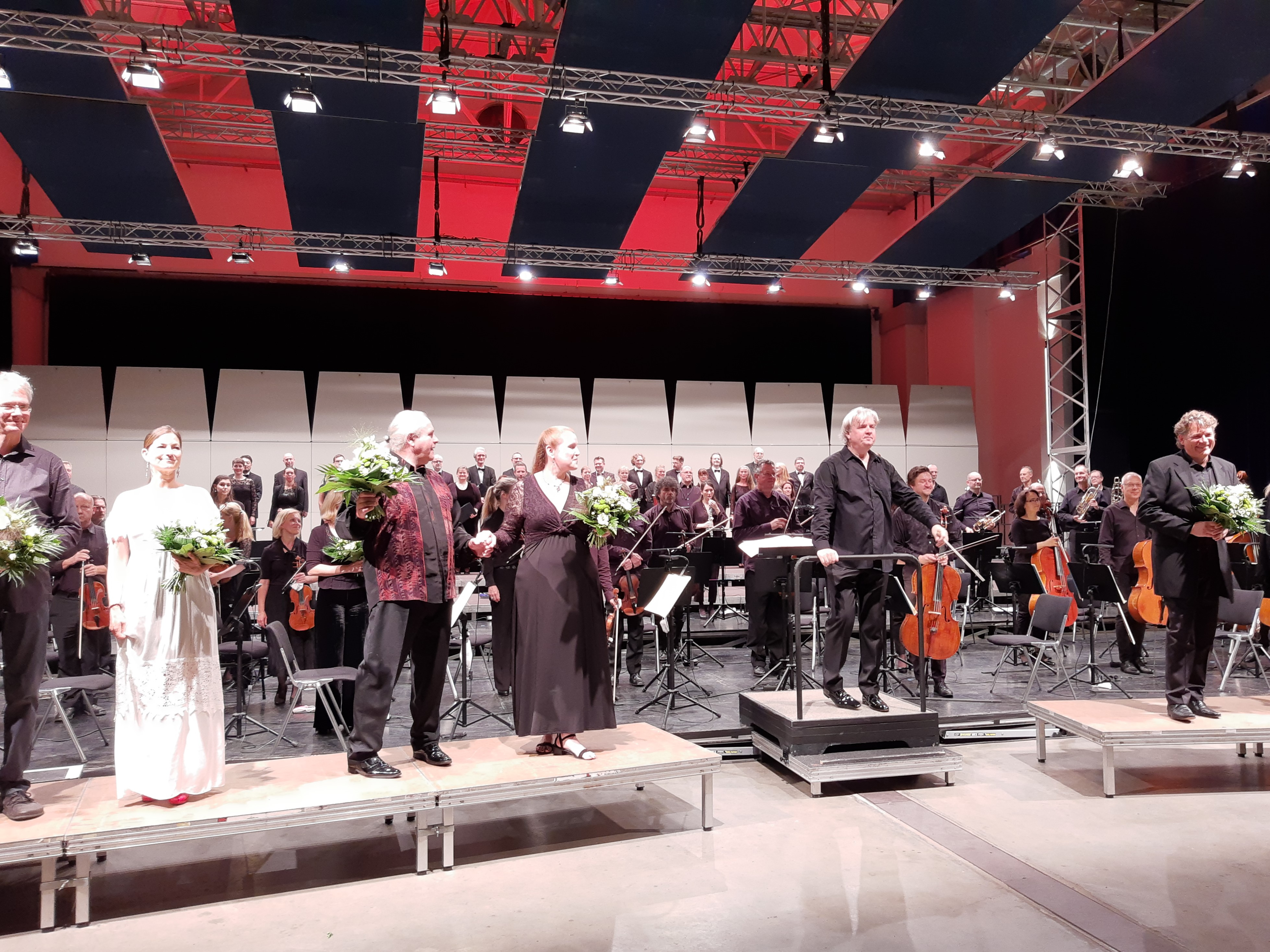
Concert performance of Beethoven's Fidelio, 10 July 2021 as part of KlassikSommer Hamm, performers receiving ovations

The hall, the only building preserved when the mine was closed, was reconstructed to serve as an event venue for an international building exhibition, the Internationale Bauausstellung Emscher Park. It became a listed historic monument (Denkmalschutz) in 1989, and was named after its architect in 1999. The hall was modernised further in 2002, and grew into an event venue of more than regional importance. It has been the location for party conventions, festivals such as Klavier-Festival-Ruhr, Ruhrtriennale and KlassikSommer Hamm, seminars, fairs and exhibitions. While performances were cancelled due to the COVID-19 pandemic in 2020, events took place again in 2021, such as a concert performance of Beethoven's Fidelio on 10 July 2021 as part of KlassikSommer Hamm, with Frank Beermann conducting soloists, choir and the Nordwestdeutsche Philharmonie.
