= Hans-Sachs-Haus =

Modernist building in Germany

Coordinates: 51°30′40″N 7°05′34″E

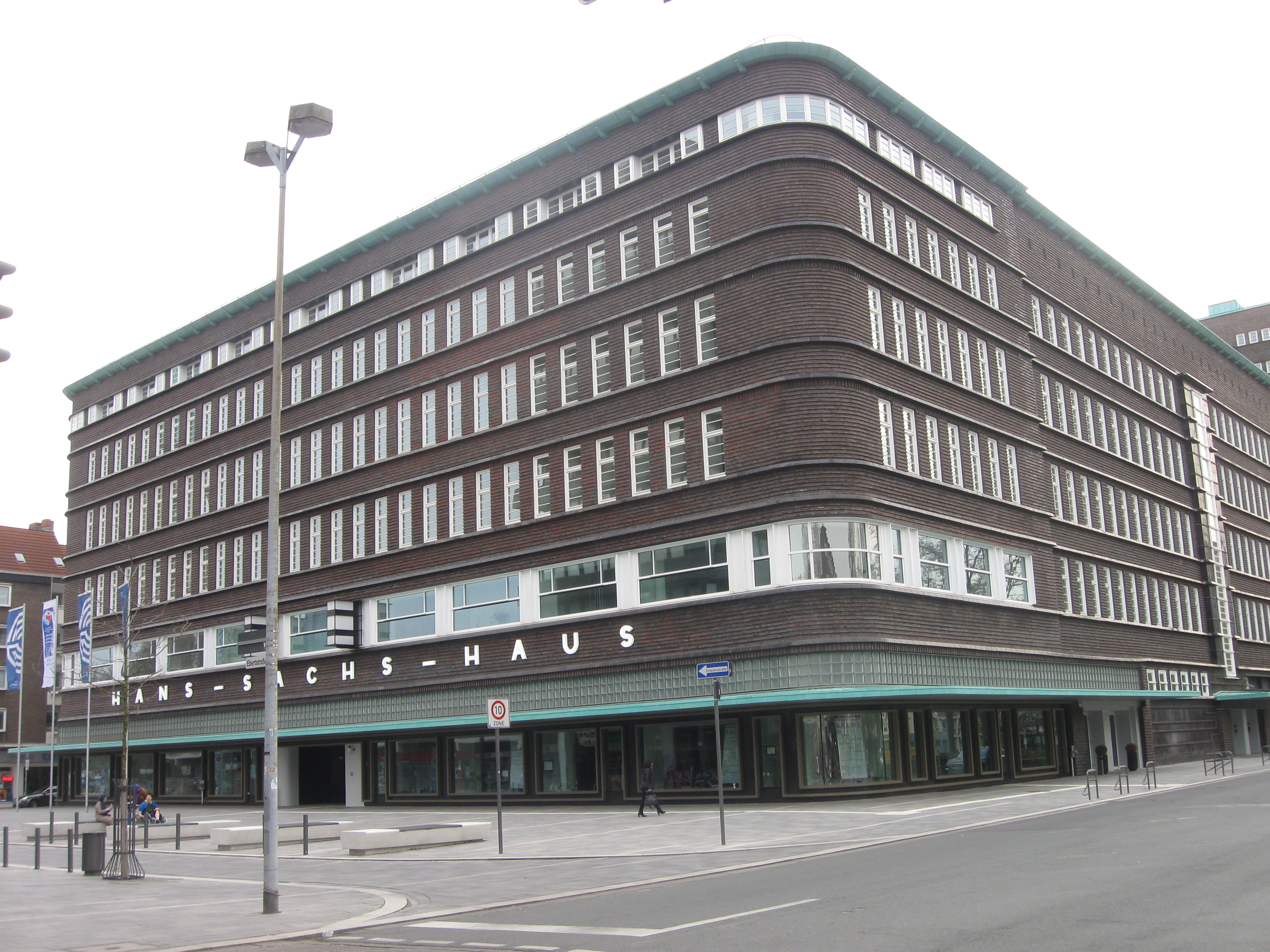
Hans-Sachs-Haus in 2014

The Hans-Sachs-Haus (HSH) is a landmark building in Gelsenkirchen, North Rhine-Westphalia, Germany, constructed between 1924 and 1927. Named after the Meistersinger Hans Sachs, the building was designed by Essen-based architect Alfred Fischer. The outside of the modernist building represents Brick Expressionism, New Objectivity (German: Neue Sachlichkeit) and Streamline Moderne, as well as Bauhaus influences which also characterize its interior. The building covers a floor area of about 27,500 square metres (296,000 sq ft).

It was initially designated as multi-function centre to house offices, a hotel and restaurant, shops, a large concert hall with one of the largest concert organs in Europe (92 stops, built by Walcker Orgelbau) at that time. The building was partially destroyed by bombing during World War II but was reconstructed by 1953. Until 1984, a paternoster lift by Schindler operated in the building.

Between 2001 and 2013, the building was subject to a major reconstruction, redevelopment and refurbishment at the cost of 69 million euro.

The building is currently used as the town hall for the Gelsenkirchen city council and about 450 of its employees. The Hans-Sachs-Haus and the nearby Musiktheater im Revier are part of the Industrial Heritage Trail.
