= Ursula Neugebauer =

German artist

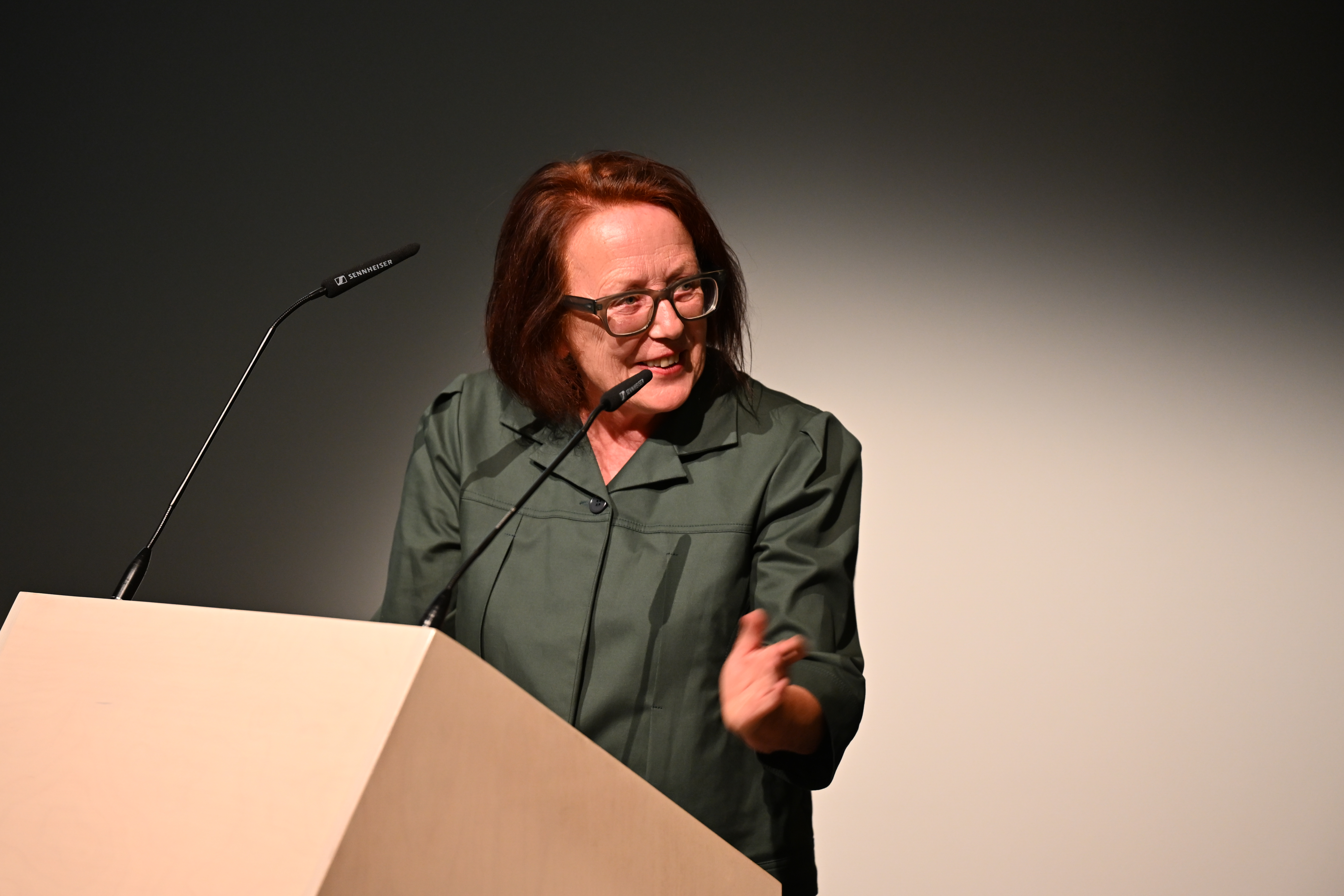
Ursula Neugebauer (2026)

Ursula Neugebauer (born 13 December 1960 in Hamm, Westfalen) is a German artist.

== Biography ==
Ursula Neugebauer studied visual art at the Academy of Fine Arts Münster, where she was named a master student by Timm Ulrichs, as well as literature at the University of Münster. She taught high school for a while and subsequently worked as an art therapist at the Universitätklinikum Münster. From 1999 to 2002 she lectured in the Department of Architecture at the Technische Universität Berlin. She has been professor of visual art at the Berlin University of the Arts. since 2003.

== Works ==
She works as an artist at the interface between installation, object, space, and media. Her works stand in the tradition of a metamorphosis of everyday life and everyday objects that is as analytical as it is precise. By doing so she allows the viewer not only to perceive the world and reality with heightened senses, but to also experience the consolations of art in the face of what is often unspeakable with respect to existence—a function of the aesthetic to which Nietzsche and Adorno made reference.

The dialectic of presence and absence as well as forgetting and remembering plays a major role in her work. It is a constant that runs through her entire oeuvre in various forms—from verschwinden (Disappear, 1999) and Briefe (Letters, 2001) to zu Tisch (At Table, 2011) and the video ...das grösste Glück, welches vorstellbar ist (The Greatest Happiness Imaginable, 2010), a work about the mathematician Grigori Perelman. In verschwinden, in a way that is as simple as it is emphatic the theme takes shape in the form of a series of mirrors. Depending on the direction of reception, they allow the viewer's image to sharply come forward or recede. The work zu Tisch, which Ursula Neugebauer developed as an installation, a performance, and a video, is a work that deals with remembrance and memory into which the viewer is actively included.

The character of a “memorial during one’s lifetime” (Michael Stoeber) is also inscribed into her hair drawings figur (Figure), portraits made out of human hair. It is a work in progress she began in 1996 and into which she included Muslim women who cover their hair in 2007. The film that was produced in this context, Haare (Hair, 2008) sheds light on the phenomenon of religiously motivated veiling as an expression of presence and absence, of the identity and integrity of the female body: here the cloth features as a metaphor for unlived life.

Her series Nachlass (Estate, 2003), in which she took photographs of people who have died, also unites features of the portrait with a work that deals with memory. Neugebauer caused a sensation with the space-consuming installation tour en l’air (1997/98), which featured in numerous exhibitions, in which she animates red ball gowns in a “ballet without ballerinas” (Manfred Schneckenburger). An electric motor and a timer cause them to awaken into a passionate dance, only to subsequently collapse in exhaustion.

== Exhibitions (selection from 2003) ==
- 2003: Drehen, Kreisen, Rotieren, Museum im Kulturspeicher, Würzburg; Kunstmuseum Heidenheim; Kunstmuseum Ahlen; Pfalzgalerie Kaiserslautern
- 2004: Cum Grano Salis, Kloster Bentlage; mit offenem Ende, Kunsthalle Recklinghausen; Kunstverein Ingolstadt,
- 2005: Körper – Leib – Raum. Der Körper im zeitgenössischen Tanz und in der Zeitgenössischen Skulptur. Skulpturenmuseum Glaskasten, Marl; Ursula Neugebauer, Galerie der Stadt Remscheid;Memoria! – 7 Positionen, Kloster Gravenhorst
- 2006: A noir, E blanc, I rouge, U vert, O bleu – Farben, Kunstmuseum Kloster Unser Lieben Frauen, Magdeburg
- 2007: Körper Gesicht Seele, Leopold Museum Wien;Asia - Europe Mediations, Museum Poznan;Ursula Neugebauer, Kunstverein Grafschaft Bentheim, Neuenhaus;Ursula Neugebauer, Werkstadt Graz
- 2008: Aktinos-Mai-Photographs, les festivals français de photographies, Quimper;European Attitude, Zendai MoMA, Shanghai; Was Bleibt, DG, Deutsche Gesellschaft für christliche Kunst, München;Necessary discourse on HYSTERIA, The Gallery
