= Richard Klophaus =

German economist

- Born: September 20, 1965 (age 60); Hamm, Germany
- Education: University of Mannheim (Ph.D., 1995)
- Occupations: Economist and professor for business administration, transport and logistics at the University of Applied Sciences, Worms
- Spouse: married
- Children: three

Richard Klophaus (born September 20, 1965 in Hamm) is a German economist and professor for business administration, transport and logistics at the University of Applied Sciences, Worms.

== Life ==
He studied at the University of Mannheim and the Toronto School of Business. After earning his Ph.D. in 1995 he worked for the German Lufthansa AG. Following this he was professor at Trier University of Applied Sciences for nine years. Klophaus was visiting professor at the Center for Transportation Studies of the University of British Columbia, Vancouver and was offered professorships in Trier (2000), Worms (2006, rejected) and Saarbrücken (2009, rejected). Since 2009 he is professor for business administration, transport and logistics at the University of Applied Sciences Worms tourism/transport department. In addition to his professorship he is board member and spokesman for the Zentrums für Recht und Wirtschaft des Luftverkehrs (ZFL) (Center for law and economy for air transport).

Klophaus works on economic and business administrative issues concerning air transport.

He is a member of the editorial boards of "International Journal of Revenue Management", of the Deutschen Verkehrswissenschaftlichen Gesellschaft (DVWG), of the German Aviation Research Society (G.A.R.S.), of the "Aktionsgemeinschaft luft- und raumfahrtorientierter Unternehmen in Deutschland (ALROUND)", of the "Arbeitsgruppe Flugplatzkonversion des Landes Rheinland-Pfalz", of the Air Transport Research Society (ATRS), of the World Conference on Transport Research Society (WCTRS), he is partner of the "Interessengemeinschaft der Regionalflughäfen (IDRF)", as well as Fellow of the Network for Aviation Research and Policy in the Netherlands (Airneth).

He is married and has three children.
