= Anna Bornhoff =

German football striker

Personal information
- Full name: Anna Bornhoff
- Date of birth: November 17, 1981 (age 44)
- Place of birth: Hamm, West Germany
- Position: Striker

Team information
- Current team: 1. FFC Turbine Potsdam

Youth career
- –1991: SG Sendenhorst
- 1991–1997: SC Germania Stromberg

Senior career*
Years	Team	Apps	(Gls)
1997–2000	SC Germania Stromberg		
2000–2002	SpVgg Bayreuth		
2002–2005	FC Eintracht Münchberg		
2005–2007	TSV Crailsheim		
2007–	1.FFC Turbine Potsdam		
- * Club domestic league appearances and goals ‡ National team caps and goals as of 14 november 2007

Anna Bornhoff (born 17 November 1981) is a German football striker. She currently plays for 1. FFC Turbine Potsdam.

== Career ==
Bornhoff was born in Hamm, North Rhine-Westphalia, and began her career at the SG Sendenhorst. She then moved to the girls' team of SC Germania Stromberg. In 2000, she moved to the university in Bayreuth. She then played for SpVgg Bayreuth and FC Eintracht Münchberg. Bornhoff went to the second division side TSV Crailsheim in 2005. She became the team's top scorer and won promotion to the Bundesliga. In 2007, she went to Berlin for a new job. She rejected offers from Tennis Borussia Berlin and newly promoted 1. FC Union Berlin and signed with 1. FFC Turbine Potsdam but cut her contract in late 2007 due to much work.

== See also ==
- Football in Germany
- List of football clubs in Germany
