= Beeck =

Beeck is a German surname. People with the name include:

- Ana Teresa Velázquez Beeck (born 1982), Mexican politician
- Christian Beeck (born 1971), German football (soccer) player
- Jens Beeck (born 1969), German politician
- Marcus Beeck (1923–1986), Australian businessman
- Zach Beeck (born 1982), Australian rules football player

== See also ==
- Van Beek
- Van der Beek
