= Alte Emscher =

River in Germany

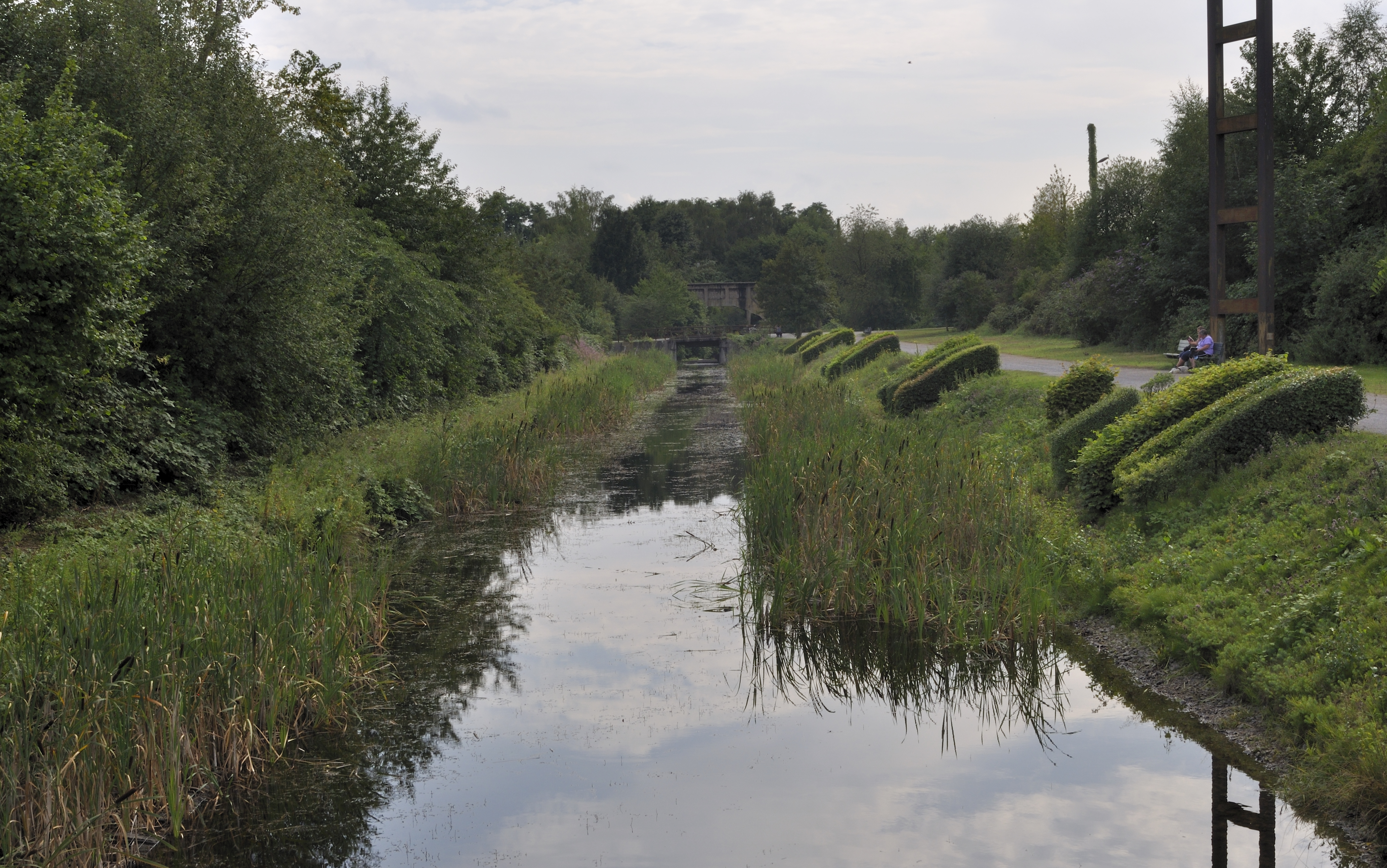
- Alte Emscher in a park in northern Duisburg

Location
- Country: Germany
- State: North Rhine-Westphalia

Physical characteristics
- Mouth
  - location: Rhine
  - coordinates: 51.4957°N 6.7181°E
- Length: 7.845 km (4.875 mi)

Basin features
- Progression: Rhine→ North Sea

Alte Emscher is a river of North Rhine-Westphalia, Germany. It flows into the Rhine near Hamborn (Duisburg). It is the former lower course of the Emscher.

== See also ==
- List of rivers of North Rhine-Westphalia
