= Richard Hessberg =

Richard Hessberg (born December 27, 1879, in Essen; died March 27, 1960, in Essen) was a German ophthalmologist of Jewish origin.

== Personal life ==
Richard Hessberg was the son of an ophthalmologist in Essen. After attending school in Essen and Höxter (Abitur) and studying medicine, he obtained his doctorate in Munich in 1904. After taking over his father's practice, he was appointed chief physician of the eye clinic of the Municipal Hospitals in Essen in 1913 on a part-time basis, "as it seemed desirable for the occupancy of the clinic that he could still maintain his panel practice".

He married Grete Koenecke from Düsseldorf and had three children with her, converting to her faith, Protestantism. They divorced in 1934.

== Medicine ==
Hessberg published numerous scientific papers, campaigned for continuing medical education, and held an important position with the Ophthalmology Department of the "Society for Science and Life in the Rhenish-Westphalian Industrial District". A commemorative publication was dedicated to him at the 48th German Medical Congress in Essen in 1929.

== Politics, literature and art ==
During the Weimar Republic, he was a member of the German People's Party. He was a member of the board of directors of the Folkwang Art Association and managing director of the "Society for Literature and Theater" in Essen. Dr. Hessberg was also a member of the Society for Bibliophilia, to which he donated a letter from Karl Immermann to Heinrich Heine in 1925. In 1920, Thomas Mann stayed with him.

In 1929, the family of five moved into a villa in Essen-Bredeney, built according to the plans of the well-known architect Alfred Fischer, a representative of New Building (New Objectivity, Bauhaus).

Hessberg collected art, and his collection included a painting by Emil Nolde entitled Wald which currently hangs in the Albertina Museum in Vienna.

== Nazi persecution ==
When Hitler came to power in Germany in 1933, Hessberg was persecuted because of his Jewish heritage. At the end of 1933, he was forced to stop working at the Essen Eye Clinic. His previous income of about 2,200 marks per month was thus reduced to about 515 marks. In October 1938, his medical license was revoked, and after the anti-Jewish program known as Kristallnacht, he was imprisoned for five weeks until mid-December.

Richard Hessberg fled after selling his assets in May 1939, and he eventually managed to emigrate to Cuba via Spain. Unable to find work there, he went to the USA in 1944, worked as an ophthalmologist in New York and obtained American citizenship.

In 1948, he officially married Erika Nockher in New York. After the war, the marriage was recognized by the city of Hamburg retroactively from 1935, because the two had become engaged in 1935 but were not allowed to marry because of Nazi racial laws since she was not Jewish.

In October 1952, he returned to Essen in retirement, but continued his scientific work and again supervised the municipal "Sehschonungsschule" which he had founded. He died in 1960 in his hometown Essen.

== Publications ==
- Über Carcinom des Prozessus vermiformis. <Mit e. Taf.>. München : C. Wolf & Sohn, 1904. (31 S.) 8". München, Med. Fak., Ref. v. Bollinger, Diss. v. 10. Nov. 1904
- Jahresbericht der Augenklinik der städt. Krankenanstalten zu Essen-Ruhr (Albert und Franka-Hirschland-Stiftung) für die Jahre 1913–1919. Dresden-Blasewitz : Kaemmerer u. Bleyl. In: Wochenschrift für Therapie u. Hygiene d. Auges; Nr. 23, 1918/19
- Bericht über die 18. Sitzung der Ophthalmologischen Abteilung der Gesellschaft für Wissenschaft und Leben im rheinisch-westfälischen Industriebezirk am Sonnabend, den 11. Januar 1930, nachmittags 4 Uhr, in der Augenklinik der städtischen Krankenanstalten zu Essen, erstattet von R. Hessberg. Sonderabdr. Aus: Zeitschrift für Augenheilkunde; 71 (1930), S. 260–271, Berlin, Verlag Karger
- Bericht über die 21. Sitzung der Ophthalmologischen Abteilung der Gesellschaft für Wissenschaft und Leben im rheinisch-westfälischen Industriebezirk am Sonnabend, den 24. Oktober 1930, nachmittags 4 Uhr, in der Augenklinik der städtischen Krankenanstalten zu Essen, erstattet von R. Hessberg. Sonderabdr. Aus: Zeitschrift für Augenheilkunde; 77 (1932), S. 274–284, Berlin, Verlag Karger
- [Bericht über die 22.] Sitzung der Ophthalmologischen Abteilung der Gesellschaft für Wissenschaft und Leben im rheinisch-westfälischen Industriebezirk am Sonnabend, den 5. März 1932, nachm. 4 Uhr, in der Augenklinik der Städtischen Krankenanstalten in Essen erstattet von R. Hessberg. Sonderabdr. Aus: Zeitschrift für Augenheilkunde; 78 (1932), S. 375–382, Berlin, Verlag Karger
- Ist Blindenfürsorge notwendig? Zum 10jährigen Bestehen des Essener Blindenfürsorgevereins E.V. In: Essener Volkszeitung, 23. Oktober 1927. HEG: DZA 915,8

== Literature ==
- Karl Immermann: Ein unbekannter Brief Immermanns vom 5. März 1825; Immermann, [Karl]; Immermann an Heine. [Faks.] (Hrsg.: Erich Schulz. Den Teiln. an d. Jahresvers. der Ges. d. Bibliophilen gestiftet v. Richard Hessberg u. Ernst v. Waldthausen). (Leipzig), (1926). 4 Bl. 4".
- Festschrift Richard Hessberg. 48. Deutscher Ärztetag, Essen 27. – 29. Juni 1929. [die Ausstattung … besorgte Max Burchartz... Hrsg. Richard Hessberg; Walther Dabitz]. Essen, Kavermann [Verein d. Ärzte f. d. Stadt u. Landkreis Essen], 1929, 138 S. : Ill.; 8-o
- Artur Schopenhauer: Über Schriftstellerei und Stil, Lesen und Bücher [Ausz.]; (Den Teilnehmern am Jahresessen d. Essener Bibliophilen' Abend und Freunden gewidmet v. R[ichard] H[eßberg]). (Essen), (1930), 6 Bl. 8". ([Essener Bibliophilenabend. Gaben; 1930,4]) Anmerkung: Aus: Schopenhauer, Parerga u. Paralipomena
- Martin Bach (Stadt Essen: Institut für Denkmalschutz und Denkmalpflege): Die Villa der Familie Dr. Hessberg in Essen-Bredeney, Stocksiepen 10/12. 2012
