= A Communication to My Friends =

"Eine Mitteilung an meine Freunde", usually referred to in English by its translated title (from German) of "A Communication to My Friends", is an extensive autobiographical work by Richard Wagner, published in 1851, in which he sought to justify his innovative concepts on the future of opera in general, and his own proposed works in particular.

== Background ==
"A Communication to my Friends" was written at a period which was turbulent even in the context of Wagner's very eventful life. Having been forced to flee Dresden, where he had been Kapellmeister at the Opera House, following his involvement with the May Uprising of 1849, he lived in exile, based in Zürich. He had no regular income and, although he had completed the score of his opera Lohengrin, he had at first little prospect of getting it performed, or of furthering his career as a composer. During the period 1849–51 he in fact wrote hardly any music, instead concentrating on writing a series of essays in which he expounded his ideas about music and the future of opera. These included "Art and Revolution" (written in Paris in 1849), "The Artwork of the Future" (1849), "Jewishness in Music" (1850) and the book-length "Opera and Drama" (1851).

Franz Liszt however offered to premiere Lohengrin in Weimar, where he was Kapellmeister to the court, and the production took place there in 1850. In the wake of this it was proposed to publish the librettos of Wagner's three most recent operas, (all of which had been written, as was normal with Wagner, by the composer himself); Der fliegende Holländer, Tannhäuser, and Lohengrin.

However, Wagner was very conscious that his concept of opera had significantly moved on since writing these works, to the extent that they hardly met – and in some aspects fell a long way short of – the standards and principles he had set out in "Opera and Drama". This provoked comment amongst both Wagner's admirers and his critics. Conscious of this, he therefore wrote "A Communication to my Friends" intending it as a preface to the librettos, explaining the evolution of his ideas and the reason for these discrepancies. 'I was burning to write Something that should take the message of my tortured brain, and speak it in a fashion to be understood by present life'. Wagner wrote to his friend Theodor Uhlig of the essay 'This is a decisive work!'

== Contents ==
=== Wagner's critique of the arts ===
The essay begins with an analysis of contemporary art-tastes, which Wagner castigates. Due to the materialism of the public 'only such artists can work in harmony with the present public taste as either imitate the monuments of the past, or stamp themselves as servants of the mode [fashion]; but both are, in very truth, no artists at all'. Art is only to be drawn from 'life itself', and the only one of the arts which can meet his criteria for 'the warm-appealing Art-work' is drama. Wagner proceeds to condemn the majority of modern artists, in painting and in music, as 'feminine [...] the world of art close fenced from Life, in which Art plays with herself.' Where however the impressions of Life produce an overwhelming 'poetic force', we find the 'masculine, the generative path of Art'.

=== Wagner's artistic development ===
The remainder of the essay traces the writer's artistic development hand-in-glove with his life story, confirming Wagner's identification of himself as one who wrings Art from Life, i.e. 'masculine', rather than a 'feminine' artistic freeloader. Admitting that with the early Rienzi 'I had it mind only to write an "opera" ', with Der fliegende Holländer 'I became, myself, the artistic modeller of a 'stuff' that lay before me only in the blunt and simple outlines of Folk-Saga' Gradually, working to the forms of myth as he perceived them, in subsequent operas, Wagner begins to remodel the idea of opera.

'I by no means set out to destroy [..] the prevailing operatic forms of aria, duet, &c.; but the omission of these forms followed from the very nature of the Stuff, with whose intelligible presentment to the Feeling [...] I had alone to do.'

Wagner unfortunately found that his audiences were not willing to follow where he led them:

The public, by their enthusiastic reception of Rienzi and their cooler welcome of the Flying Dutchman, had plainly shown me what I must set before them if I sought to please. I completely undeceived their expectations; they left the theatre, after the first performance of Tannhaüser, [1845] in a confused and discontented mood. - The feeling of utter loneliness in which I now found myself, quite unmanned me.[...] My Tannhaüser had appealed to a handful of intimate friends alone.

=== Wagner's plans for the future ===
Wagner refers to some of his projects, including a drama Jesus of Nazareth (the draft for which was published after his death), and his libretto Siegfried's Death (which was eventually to evolve into the Ring cycle). He explains how he intends to apply his new techniques of opera to this libretto. After relating his disastrous visit to Paris in 1849, he gives credit to his 'wondrous friend', Franz Liszt, for standing by him and undertaking to stage Lohengrin.

Finally Wagner announces:

I shall never write an Opera more. As I have no wish to invent an arbitrary title for my works, I will call them Dramas [...]

I propose to produce my myth in three complete dramas, preceded by a lengthy Prelude (Vorspiel). [...]

At a specially-appointed Festival, I propose, some future time, to produce those three Dramas with their Prelude, in the course of three days and a fore-evening. The object of this production I shall consider thoroughly attained, if I and my artistic comrades, the actual performers, shall within these four evenings succeed in artistically conveying my purpose to the true Emotional (not the Critical) Understanding of spectators who shall have gathered together expressly to learn it. [...]

This is his first public announcement of the form of what would become the Ring cycle.

== Sources ==
- Wagner, Richard, tr. William Ashton Ellis (1994), The Art Work of the Future, and other works, Lincoln and London. ISBN 978-0-8032-9752-4. "A Communication to My Friends" is on pp. 269–392.
- Wagner, Richard, tr. William Ashton Ellis (1995), Jesus of Nazareth, and other writings, Lincoln and London. ISBN 978-0-8032-9780-7.
- Wagner, Richard, tr. J. S. Shedlock (1890) Richard Wagner's Letters to his Dresden Friends, London.
