= Ferdinand Praeger =

German composer, pianist and writer

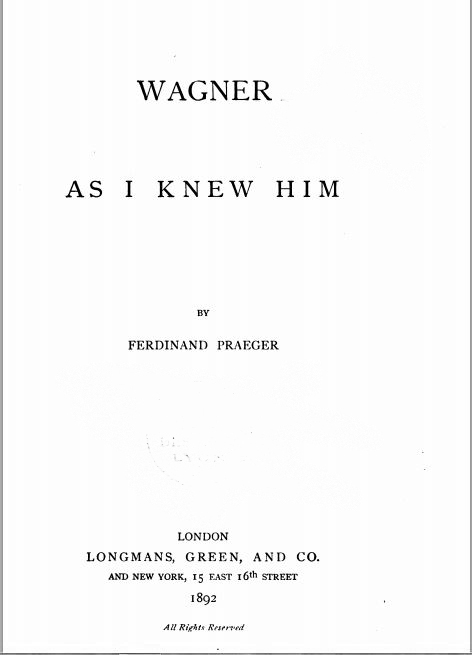
Title page of Ferdinand Praeger's "Wagner as I Knew Him" (1892)

Ferdinand Praeger (22 January 1815 – 2 September 1891) (aka Ferdinand Christian Wilhelm Praeger) was a composer, music teacher, pianist and writer. He is now best known for his controversial biography of Richard Wagner, Wagner As I Knew Him, published in 1892 after Praeger's death.

== Life ==
Praeger was born in Leipzig, to Jewish parents, the Dutch-Jewish violinist, composer and conductor Heinrich (Hijman Chaim Aron) Aloys Praeger (Amsterdam 1783 – Magdeburg 1854) and his English-Jewish wife Elizabeth (Wilhelmina), née Davis or Davison (b. 1788). Heinrich Praeger was a director of opera in Leipzig until 1828, and later at Hanover and Magdeburg.

Praeger studied the cello as a child but on the advice of Hummel took up the piano. In 1831 he moved to The Hague and in 1834 went on to London, which thereafter became his home. From 1842 onwards he was the British correspondent of the Leipzig Neue Zeitschrift für Musik, the journal founded by Robert Schumann. In England he continued as a teacher and a composer, marrying his French wife Léonie in about 1850. His many compositions included piano music, chamber music, and orchestral works (his overture Abellino was conducted by Hector Berlioz in London in 1855). These included thirty-six piano sonatas and twenty-five string quartets.

In 1869, Praeger undertook the tuition of the then eleven-year-old pianist Sophia Flora Heilbron, and the two continued to work together until Heilbron was at least thirteen.

He wrote a number of pieces to celebrate Queen Victoria's Golden Jubilee (1887), and was still composing shortly before his death in 1891. Some of his works are dedicated to his musical friends, including an 1889 Impromptu dedicated to the composer Ethel Smyth. He was active in British musical social life and worked with many musicians visiting Britain, including Antonín Dvořák. But despite lobbying William George Cusins (the Master of the Queen's Musick) to conduct his other orchestral works, he was unable ever to get these performed.

In 1890 Praeger agreed a contract with the Earl of Dysart to send him for the next 12 years his compositions, for a remuneration of £200 a year. The Earl, who was President of the London Wagner Society, also commissioned him to write a biography of Wagner. Praeger died in London in 1891.

== Praeger and Wagner ==
Praeger claimed to be an early advocate of Wagner's music, having written the first article on Wagner in the English press in 1845, after hearing the overture to Tannhäuser in Germany. In fact, the article was on Wagner's earlier opera, Rienzi. Praeger learned much about Wagner in correspondence with their mutual friend August Röckel, but his published journalism shows him to have been sceptical about the music of the "New German School" (which included Wagner, Hector Berlioz and Franz Liszt) as late as 1854, in which year he claimed to have been a leader amongst those who persuaded the Philharmonic Society to invite Wagner to London to conduct their 1855 season. However, in March 1855, just before Wagner arrived in London, Praeger wrote to George Hogarth (the Secretary of the Society) that he was not a Wagnerite and had never heard any of Wagner's operas.

It was in London that Praeger and Wagner actually met for the first time. In his autobiography Mein Leben, Wagner explains how he was introduced to Praeger, via correspondence, by the Röckel family, and how Praeger put him up on his first night in London. Praeger later accompanied him on visits to various musical notables, including the conductor Sir Michael Costa and the violinist Prosper Sainton (who was in fact the prime mover of Wagner's appointment in London). Wagner describes Praeger patronisingly as "an unusually good-natured fellow, though of an excitability insufficiently balanced by his standard of culture". Together they visited the pantomime in London and went on trips to Brighton and Gravesend. Although Praeger sought to be helpful to Wagner during the London season, he may in fact have contributed to the poor reception of Wagner by leading English critics, such as J. W. Davison of The Times, by writing an article in the American Musical World looking forward to the uproar that the music of this "ultra-red republican" would cause in "the musical world of this classical, staid, sober, proper, exclusive, conservative London".

Wagner became godfather to one of Praeger's sons, Richard Wagner Charles Henry Praeger (b. 1855). Praeger remained in correspondence with Wagner for some years thereafter, and met with him on several occasions. These included stays with Wagner and his wife Minna in Zürich in July 1857 and with Wagner and his second wife Cosima at Tribschen near Lucerne in the summer of 1871. Praeger saw Wagner at the time of the abortive 1861 Paris production of Tannhäuser, and also saw him at the 1882 Bayreuth Festival. By this time, however, in Praeger's own words, "The world accepted [Wagner] as one of its great men" and Praeger no longer had any part in his life.

== Wagner As I Knew Him ==
Praeger's Wagner As I Knew Him, which he had dictated during his last years, the first full-length biography of Wagner to be created in English, was published a year after the author's death and nine years after the death of its subject. The work was controversial for a number of reasons. Not least, the author claimed, in his introductory dedication to the Earl of Dysart, "an uninterrupted friendship of close upon half a century" – whereas the period of their intimacy can be set at the most from 1855 until 1871. The author's doubtful claims to have been Wagner's first English champion, and his early opposition to the "New German School" were also challenged from the start, although the Wagner enthusiast George Bernard Shaw said of the book, "A more vivid and convincing portrait than Praeger's was never painted in words."

But the book soon met more forceful criticism from Wagner's English translator William Ashton Ellis and Wagner's son-in-law (and major promoter of the Wagner cult at Bayreuth) Houston Stewart Chamberlain. In particular they objected to Praeger's detailed account of Wagner's involvement in the 1849 May Uprising in Dresden, which to Chamberlain's far-right-wing political opinions was deeply embarrassing. Ellis wrote a pamphlet (1849: A Refutation) denouncing the book, and Chamberlain was successful in suppressing its German publication. Praeger's case was not helped when Chamberlain and Ellis revealed that he had fabricated or mis-represented a number of Wagner's letters that had been included in the book, often in such a way as to promote Praeger's own profile. Chamberlain had insinuated himself in the household of the Earl of Dysart in order to examine the originals of the letters. However, as the music historian Stewart Spencer points out, there was something "distinctly comical" about Chamberlain's complaints. As Chamberlain was himself "currently overseeing one of the most egregious attempts in the history of musicology to misrepresent an artist [Wagner] by systematically censoring his correspondence, to criticize Praeger ... suggests either a pot-and-kettle blindness or a deliberate attempt to divert attention". Nevertheless, Praeger's reputation has never recovered from this initial onslaught. The attack on the biography led to the resignation of Dysart from the Presidency of the London Wagner Society.

Wagner's supporters may have also been irked by other apparent fabrications by Praeger, such as the claim that Wagner had told him that his first love, at the age of 14, was a Jewish girl in Leipzig. Throughout the book, Praeger in fact supports and justifies Wagner's anti-Jewish prejudices, including a defence of his anti-Semitic essay Das Judenthum in der Musik, and gives the excuse that "Towards Jews and Judaism [Wagner] had a most pronounced antipathy, and yet this did not prevent him from numbering many Hebrews amongst his most devoted friends." Praeger, however, nowhere reveals that he himself was Jewish.

== Sources ==
- Anon (1891). "Obituary - Mr. Ferdinand Praeger" in The Musical Times vol. 32 no. 584 (October 1891), pp. 603–4.
- Anon (1892). "Review - Wagner as I knew him ", in The Musical Times, vol. 33 no. 590 (April 1892), pp. 234–235.
- Cormack, David (2013). "Praeger, Ferdinand", in The Cambridge Wagner Encyclopedia ed. N. Vazsonyi, Cambridge: Cambridge University Press. ISBN 978-1-107-00425-2
- Cormack, David (2014). " 'Faithful, All Too Faithful!' (part 4), on The Wagner Journal website, accessed 19 March 2015.
- Davison, J. W., ed. Henry Davison (1912). From Mendelssohn to Wagner. London: Wm. Reeves.
- Grove, George and John Warrack (n.d.). "Praeger, Ferdinand (Christian Wilhelm)" in Oxford Music Online (subscription required), accessed 14 March 2015.
- Nay, Jessica S. (2012). Rediscovering Pieces of the Past: The Manuscript Scores of Ferdinand Praeger , State University of New York at Buffalo Music Library, accessed 14 March 2015.
- Newman, Ernest (1976), The Life of Richard Wagner, 4 vols. Cambridge: Cambridge University Press. ISBN 978-0-685-14824-2.
- Praeger, Ferdinand (1892). Wagner As I Knew Him, London and New York: Longmans, Green and Co. Kindle version, Project Gutenberg, accessed 17 March 2015.
- Spencer, Stewart (2000). Wagner Remembered. London: Faber and Faber. ISBN 978-0-571-19653-1
- Slavíková, Jitka (1986). "Dvořák in England", in Musical Times vol. 127 no. 1720 (August 1986), p. 427.
- Wagner, Richard (tr. Andrew Gray) (1992), My Life, New York: Da Capo Press. ISBN 978-0-306-80481-6.
