= Wieland der Schmied =

Wieland der Schmied is German for "Wieland the Blacksmith" and may refer to:

- Wieland der Schmied (Hitler), an unfinished juvenilia opera by Adolf Hitler
- Wieland der Schmied (libretto), an opera libretto draft by Richard Wagner
- Wieland der Schmied (Bella), an opera by Ján Levoslav Bella
