= Vladimír Roy =

Slovak poet and translator

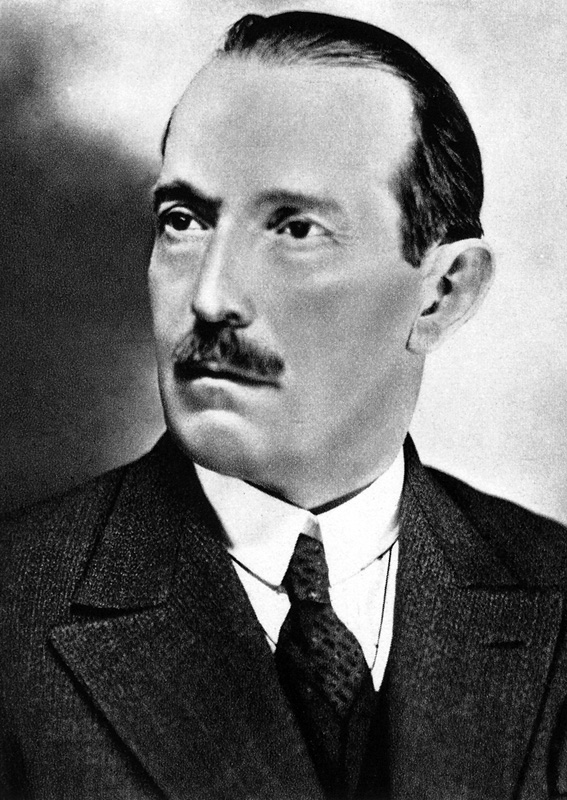
Vladimír Roy in 1937

Vladimír Roy (17 April 1885, in Kochanovce (Kochanócz), Austria-Hungary – 6 February 1936, in Nový Smokovec, Czechoslovakia) was a Slovak poet, translator and opera librettist.

He provided the libretto for the opera Wieland der Schmied composed in 1881–90 by the Slovak composer Ján Levoslav Bella.
