= Theodor Uhlig =

German composer (1822–1853)

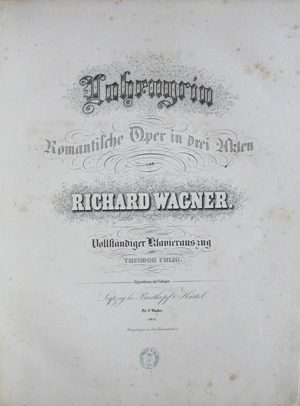

Background information
- Born: 15 February 1822
- Died: 3 January 1853 (aged 30)

Theodor Uhlig (15 February 1822 – 3 January 1853) was a German violin-player, composer and music critic. He was the illegitimate son of Frederick Augustus II of Saxony.

== Uhlig and Wagner ==
Born in Wurzen, Saxony, and orphaned at a young age, Uhlig showed such musical talent that he was singled out for musical training, which led to becoming a violinist in the Dresden orchestra at the age of 19. In the following year (1842), Richard Wagner came to Dresden for the premiere of his opera, Rienzi, and remained in the city as Kapellmeister until his flight following the May Uprising in the city of 1849 (in which he had taken a leading part).

Although originally opposed to Wagner, Uhlig quickly became a passionate convert. A tangible sign of his devotion was his arrangement of Wagner's opera Lohengrin for piano. Uhlig defended Wagner in magazine articles and reviews; Wagner wrote of him in his autobiography Mein Leben that he

grasped with clear understanding and perfect agreement those very tendencies of mine which many musicians of apparently wider culture than his own regarded with almost despairing horror.

During the early years of Wagner's exile from Germany, Uhlig remained one of his most important contacts and the source of an extensive correspondence until Uhlig's early death in 1853 in Dresden from consumption. Although Uhlig's letters to Wagner have not survived, there are nearly 100 letters from Wagner to Uhlig from 1849 to 1853, many of them very lengthy. In these, the composer is often very frank about his own moods and depression, and frequently abusive of others, including mutual friends (e.g. accusing his former secretary Ritter of onanism).

Uhlig in part repaid Wagner by a series of articles, published in 1850, caustically attacking the opera Le prophète by Wagner's supposed enemy, Giacomo Meyerbeer. In a series of six essays in the Neue Zeitschrift für Musik, entitled "Contemporary Reflections", Uhlig castigated the music of the opera and attacked Meyerbeer personally, not least as a representative of "Hebraic art-taste" (Meyerbeer was Jewish). Wagner picked up on this phrase as an excuse to launch his virulent attack "Jewishness in Music". Uhlig was involved in the negotiations for the publication of this pamphlet.

Wagner later dedicated to Uhlig his major essay Opera and Drama. It was also to Uhlig that he first wrote of his intentions to create his Ring Cycle as a series of four operas. In this letter, Wagner asks Uhlig to 'borrow' for him a book that he needs about the Völsunga saga from the Dresden Royal Library.

== Uhlig as composer and critic ==
Uhlig's compositions, which are now completely forgotten, were extensive (running up to opus number 84). They included orchestral and chamber works, songs and Singspiele. He also wrote thoughtfully about other musical topics, including the music of Ludwig van Beethoven and Franz Liszt, and on phrase structure in music.

== Notes ==
=== Sources ===
- Wagner, Richard, tr. J. Shedlock, Richard Wagner's Letters to his Dresden Friends, London, 1870
- Weiner, Marc A., Richard Wagner and the Anti-Semitic Imagination, Lincoln, Nebraska, 1997
