= Opera and Drama =

1851 essay by Richard Wagner

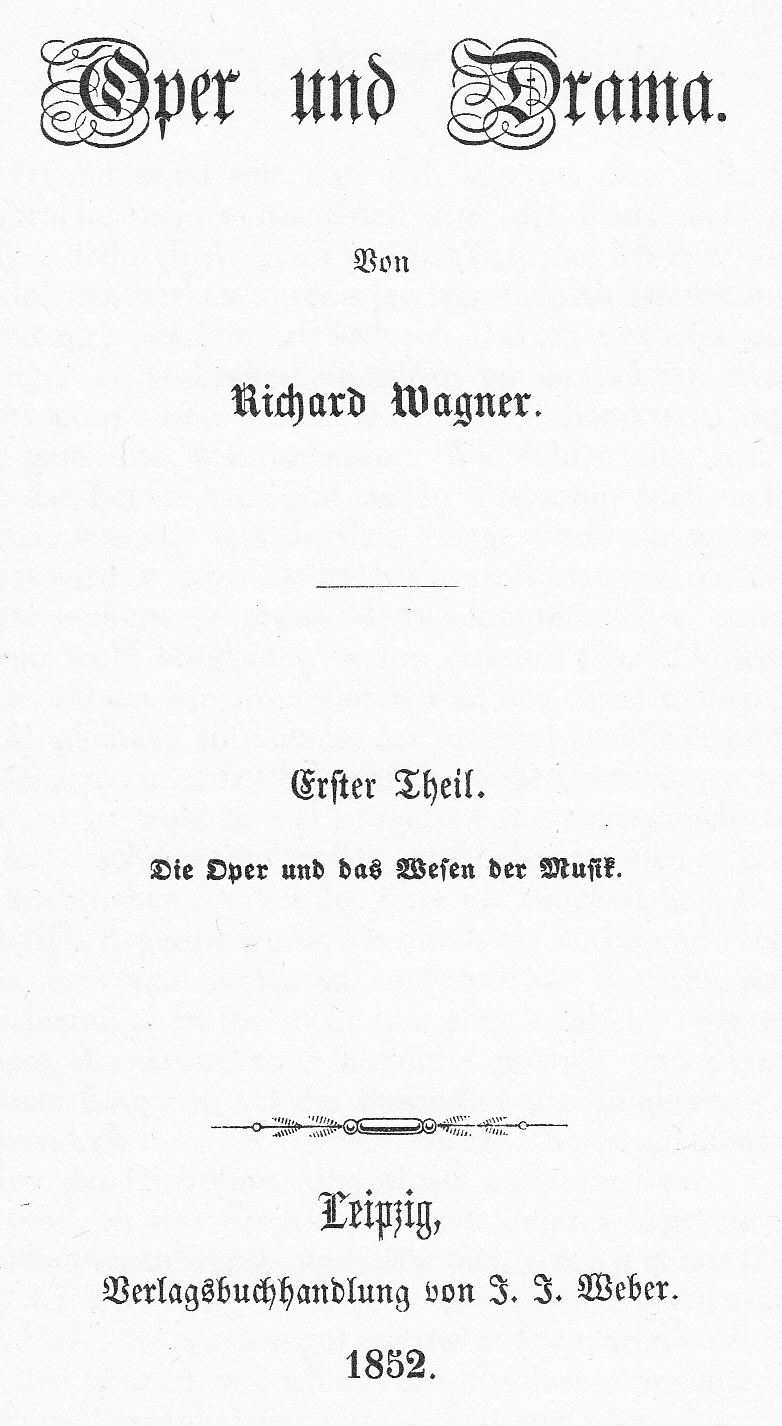
Title page of first edition.

Opera and Drama (German: Oper und Drama) is a book-length essay written by Richard Wagner in 1851 setting out his ideas on the ideal characteristics of opera as an art form. It belongs with other essays of the period in which Wagner attempted to explain and reconcile his political and artistic ideas, at a time when he was working on the libretti, and later the music, of his Ring cycle.

== Background ==
As the longest of all of Wagner's literary works apart from his autobiography Mein Leben (376 pages long in its English translation), Opera and Drama is perhaps better described by the word 'treatise', as suggested by its translator W. Ashton Ellis. It follows from his earlier writings of the period 1849–50: more particularly "Art and Revolution" (1849), which sets out Wagner's ideals for an artwork that would be appropriate for his ideal society; "The Artwork of the Future" (1849), which sets out ideas for a music drama which would meet such ideals; and "Jewishness in Music" (1850), an antisemitic diatribe attacking the influence of "Jewishness" on European art music.

Wagner wrote the entire book in Zurich in four months between October 1850 and January 1851. He gave public readings of large extracts in Zurich in early 1851, with a dedication to Theodor Uhlig. Parts of it were published in the Monatschrift, an intellectual magazine, and the whole was published in Leipzig in 1852. A second edition appeared in 1868, with a dedication to the German political writer Constantin Frantz.

The earliest English translation had appeared as early as 1856, but the translation generally used in the English-speaking world is that by W. Ashton Ellis, first published in 1893. Like the original, this is full of complex phrases, grammar and structure, which render the work difficult to absorb. Even Ellis commented that some 'tantalising epithets seemed to group themselves into a coruscation baffling all description.'

== Overview ==
Opera and Drama is in three parts.

The first part, "Opera and the Nature of Music", is an extended attack on contemporary opera, with significant attacks on Rossini and Meyerbeer, whom Wagner regarded as betraying art for public acclaim and sensationalism. In this section Wagner makes his famous allegation of Meyerbeer's operas consisting of "effects without causes".

The second part, "The Play and the Nature of Dramatic Poetry" is Wagner's most extensive consideration of the role of poetry in his idealised music drama.

The last section, "The Arts of Poetry and Tone in the Drama of the Future", gives a conspectus of the ideal music drama as a whole—an ideal which, however, in reality Wagner was obliged to compromise to achieve success in his later works.

== Significance ==
The Wagner scholar Curt von Westernhagen identified three important problems discussed in the essay which were particularly relevant to Wagner's operatic development: the problem of unifying verse stress with melody; the problems caused by formal arias in dramatic structure, and how opera music could be organized on a different basis of organic growth and modulation; and the function of musical motifs in linking elements of the plot whose connections might otherwise be inexplicit (what was to become known as the leitmotif technique, although Wagner himself did not use this word).
