= Art and Revolution =

1849 essay by Richard Wagner

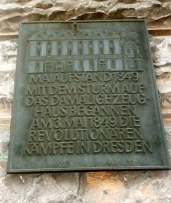
Plaque commemorating the 1849 revolution in Dresden, for his part in which Wagner was forced to live in exile

"Art and Revolution" (original German title "Die Kunst und die Revolution") is a long essay by the composer Richard Wagner, originally published in 1849. It sets out some of his basic ideas about the role of art in society and the nature of opera.

== Background ==
Wagner had been an enthusiast for the revolutions of 1848 and had been an active participant in the Dresden Revolution of 1849, as a consequence of which he was forced to live for many years in exile from Germany. "Art and Revolution" was one of a group of polemical articles he published in exile. His enthusiasm for such writing at this stage of his career is in part explained by his inability, in exile, to have his operas produced. But it was also an opportunity for him to express and justify his deep-seated concerns about the true nature of opera as music drama at a time when he was beginning to write his libretti for his Ring cycle, and turning his thoughts to the type of music it would require. This was quite different from the music of popular grand operas of the period, which Wagner believed were a sell-out to commercialism in the arts. "Art and Revolution" therefore explained his ideals in the context of the failure of the 1848 revolutions to bring about a society like that which Wagner conceived to have existed in Ancient Greece—truly dedicated to, and which could be morally sustained by, the arts—which for Wagner meant, supremely, his conception of drama.

Wagner wrote the essay over two weeks in Paris and sent it to a French political journal, the National; they refused it, but it was published in Leipzig and ran to a second edition.

== Summary ==
The following summary is based on the standard translation of Wagner's prose works by William Ashton Ellis, first published in 1895. Quotations are taken from this translation.

Wagner notes that artists complain that economic uncertainty following the 1848 revolutions has damaged their prospects. But such materialistic complaints are selfish and unjustified. Those who practised art for art's sake "suffered also in the former times when others were rejoicing". He therefore undertakes an examination of the role of art in society, commencing with a historical review starting in Ancient Greece.

He extols the Apollonian spirit, embodied in the tragedies of Aeschylus, as "the highest conceivable form of Art – the DRAMA". But the fall of the Athenian state meant that philosophy, rather than art, dominated European society. Wagner portrays the Romans as brutal and sensuous, and the Church as having hypocritically betrayed Jesus's gospel of Universal Love. "The Greek ... could procreate Art for the very joy of manhood; the Christian, who impartially cast aside both Nature and himself; could only sacrifice to his God on the altar of renunciation; he durst not bring his actions or his work as offering, but believed that he must seek His favour by abstinence from all self-prompted venture." The worldly power of Christendom indeed "had its share in the revival of art" by patronage of artists celebrating its own supremacy. Moreover, "the security of riches awoke in the ruling classes the desire for more refined enjoyment of their wealth". Modern changes in society have resulted in the catastrophe that art has sold "her soul and body to a far worse mistress - Commerce."

The modern stage offers two irreconcilable genres, split from Wagner's Greek ideal - the play, which lacks "the idealising influence of music", and opera which is "forestalled of the living heart and lofty purpose of actual drama". Moreover, opera is enjoyed specifically because of its superficial sensationalism. In a critique which lies at the heart of much of his writings at this period and thereafter, (and which is a clear dig at composers such as Giacomo Meyerbeer), Wagner complains:

There are even many of our most popular artists who do not in the least conceal the fact, that they have no other ambition than to satisfy this shallow audience. They are wise in their generation; for when the prince leaves a heavy dinner, the banker a fatiguing financial operation, the working man a weary day of toil, and go to the theatre: they ask for rest, distraction, and amusement, and are in no mood for renewed effort and fresh expenditure of force. This argument is so convincing, that we can only reply by saying: it would be more decorous to employ for this purpose any other thing in the wide world, but not the body and soul of Art. We shall then be told, however, that if we do not employ Art in this manner, it must perish from out our public life: i.e.,—that the artist will lose the means of living.

Wagner continues by comparing many features of contemporary art and art practice to those of Ancient Greece, always of course to the detriment of the former; some of this decay was due to the introduction in the ancient world of slave-labour, to which Wagner links contemporary wage labour; concluding this section by asserting that the Greeks had formed the perfect Art-work (i.e. Wagner's own conception of Greek drama), whose nature we have lost.

Only the great Revolution of Mankind, whose beginnings erstwhile shattered Grecian Tragedy, can win for us this Art-work. For only this Revolution can bring forth from its hidden depths, in the new beauty of a nobler Universalism, that which it once tore from the conservative spirit of a time of beautiful but narrow-meted culture—and tearing it, engulphed.

This revolution consists for Wagner of a not very clearly defined return to Nature. Elements of this are a condemnation of the rich and "the mechanic's pride in the moral consciousness of his labour", not however to be confused with "the windy theories of our socialistic doctrinaires" who believe that society might be reconstructed without overthrow. Wagner's goal is "the strong fair Man, to whom Revolution shall give his Strength, and Art his Beauty!"

Wagner then berates those who simply dismiss these ideas as utopian. Reconciling his two main inspirations, Wagner concludes "Let us therefore erect the altar of the future, in Life as in the living Art, to the two sublimest teachers of mankind:—Jesus, who suffered for all men; and Apollo, who raised them to their joyous dignity!"

== Reception and influence ==
Wagner's idealism of ancient Greece was common among his romantic intellectual circle (for example, his Dresden friend the architect Gottfried Semper wrote to demonstrate the ideal qualities of classical Greek architecture). Although Wagner at the time imagined his intended operas to constitute the "perfect Art-works" mentioned in this essay and described further in "The Artwork of the Future" and "Opera and Drama", with the aim of redeeming society through art, in the event practicality superseded the naive ideas (and shallow historical interpretation) expressed in these essays. However, the concept of music drama as Wagner eventually forged it is undoubtedly rooted in the ideas he expressed at this time. Indeed, the essay is notable among other things for Wagner's first use of the term Gesamtkunstwerk (total art work)—in this case referring to his view of Greek drama as combining music, dance and poetry, rather than his later application of the term to his own works.

Curt von Westernhagen also detects in the essay the influence of Proudhon's What is Property? which Wagner read in June 1849.

In 1872, by which time he was no longer an outcast, but had established himself as a leading artist, Wagner wrote a new introduction to the essay. He began by quoting Thomas Carlyle's History of Frederick the Great (1858–1865), feeling himself "in complete accord" with Carlyle's call in the aftermath of the "Spontaneous Combustion" of revolution and resulting "Millennium of Anarchies" to "abridge it, spend your heart's-blood upon abridging it, ye Heroic Wise that are to come!" As Wagner explains, "I believed in the Revolution, and in its unrestrainable necessity ... only, I also felt that I was called to point out to it the way of rescue. ... It is needless to recall the scorn which my presumption brought upon me ...". The essay, the first of a series of polemical blasts from Wagner in the years 1849 to 1852, which included "The Artwork of the Future" and "Jewishness in Music", indeed provided fuel to those who wished to characterize Wagner as an impractical and/or eccentric radical idealist.

Wagner had however been writing in part to deliberately provoke, on the basis that any notoriety was better than no notoriety. In a letter of June 1849 to Franz Liszt, one of his few influential allies at the time, he wrote "I must make people afraid of me. Well, I have no money, but what I do have is an enormous desire to commit acts of artistic terrorism"; without denying the sincerity of Wagner's views at the time of writing, this article can be seen perhaps as one of those acts.

During and immediately after the Russian Revolution of 1917, the ideas of Wagner's "Art and Revolution" were influential in the proletarian art movement and on the ideas of those such as Platon Kerzhentsev, the theorist of Proletcult Theatre.

The song "The Damnation Slumbereth Not" by the band Half Man Half Biscuit on their 2002 album Cammell Laird Social Club includes a slightly-modified quotation from the essay:

Well of course music these days is the slave of mammon and as a result
It has become corrupt and shallow
Its real essence is industry
Its moral purpose is the acquisition of money
Its aesthetic pretext is the entertainment of those who are bored

== Texts ==
- Ellis's English translation online

== Notes ==
=== Sources ===
- Peter Burbidge and Richard Sutton (eds), The Wagner Companion, London 1979 ISBN 0-571-11450-4
- Ernest Newman, The Life of Richard Wagner, vol. II (1848–1860), Cambridge, 1976. ISBN 0-521-29095-3
- von Geldern, James (1993). Bolshevik Festivals, 1917–1920. Berkeley: University of California Press – via California Digital Library.
- Richard Wagner, translator W. Ashton Ellis, The Art-Work of the Future, and other works, University of Nebraska Press, 1993. ISBN 978-0-8032-9752-4
- Richard Wagner, translator and ed. S. Spencer and B. Millington Selected Letters of Richard Wagner, London 1987.
