= Das Judenthum in der Musik =

Antisemitic work on music theory by Richard Wagner

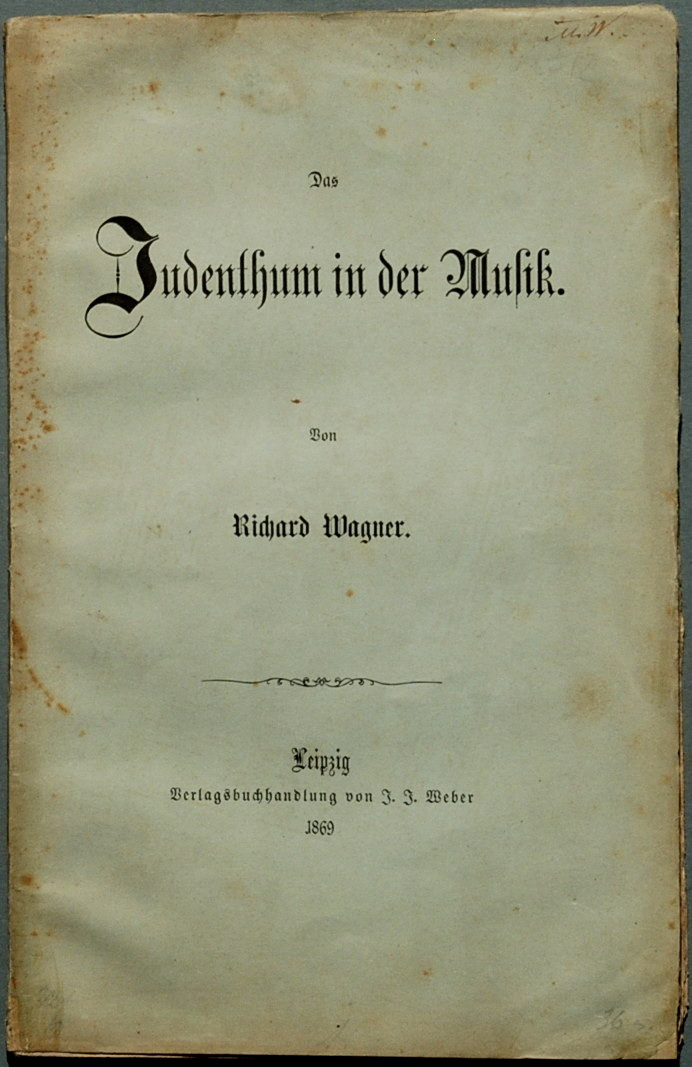
Title page of the second edition of Das Judenthum in der Musik, published in 1869

"Das Judenthum in der Musik" (German for Judaism in Music, but perhaps more accurately understood in contemporary language as Jewishness in Music), is an essay by composer Richard Wagner which criticizes the influence of Jews and their "essence" on European art music, arguing that they have not contributed to its development but have rather commodified and degraded it.

It alleges that Jews infiltrated the music industry not through their artistic capabilities, but because of their control over financial resources. In particular it discusses the music of Jewish composers Felix Mendelssohn and Giacomo Meyerbeer, acknowledging its technical proficiency but criticizing it as lacking genuine artistic passion. According to Wagner, authentic art is rooted in immersion within the organic life of a culture, and Jews, indicated as being outsiders to this culture, are capable of only making artificial or superficial contributions.

It was first published under a pseudonym in the Neue Zeitschrift für Musik (NZM) of Leipzig in September 1850. It was republished in 1869, this time bearing Wagner's name, with expanded commentary on the original publication's purpose, response and the purported negative impact on Wagner and his associates' careers.

== Background ==
There is debate over the translation of the title, Das Judenthum in der Musik, into English. The article's first translator, William Ashton Ellis, gave it the title Judaism in Music. "Judaism" in modern English tends to refer to the Abrahamic religion of the Jews. "Judenthum" however in 19th-century Germany carried a much broader meaning, including the culture and social practices of the Jews. It also carried a pejorative sense associating Jews with money-making. Wagner also intended this latter dual meaning, given the context of the essay in which he uses "Judenthum" almost synonymously with "commercialism"; this usage is also reflected in his personal letters.

Wagner's essay primarily attacks Jewish culture, artistic taste, and alleged economic power and commercialism, rather than the Jewish race or religion. In the essay Wagner speaks of the need to emancipate both Jews and non-Jews from "Judenthum". For this reason, alternative translations of the title have been given, including Jewishness in Music and Jewry in Music.

The essay was written during his exile in Zürich after participating in the May Uprising in Dresden, part of the Revolutions of 1848. It follows Art and Revolution and The Artwork of the Future in a series of polemical essays intended to provoke controversy and discussion over the purpose and future direction of European art. Wagner had a radical mindset at the time, and was formulating what would become his magnum opus, the 16-hour long music drama Der Ring des Nibelungen, with which he intended to revitalize German art and society, which he perceived to be in decline.

In these previous essays, Wagner criticized the perceived shallowness of the then-popular French grand opera, such as that of the celebrated Jewish composer Giacomo Meyerbeer. Wagner was emboldened to write again on the subject, this time from a fully antisemitic perspective, after learning of the great success of Meyerbeer's 1849 opera Le prophète, and reading a series of essays written by his close associate Theodor Uhlig, criticizing Le prophète as exemplifying inferior "Hebrew artistic taste".

== The original article of 1850 ==
The first version of the article appeared in the NZM under the pseudonym of K. Freigedank ("K. Freethought"). In an April 1851 letter to Franz Liszt, Wagner stated that he used a pseudonym "not out of fear, but to prevent the question being dragged down by the Jews to a purely personal level". Ironically, this same letter also reveals Wagner's deep personal antipathy for Meyerbeer as partially motivating the essay, who reminds him of the “darkest” period of his life.

In the essay, Wagner criticizes the artistry of Jews. Wagner argues that Jewish participation in European music represents not a contribution to its enrichment, but rather a symptom of a cultural epoch in decline.

Wagner uses Felix Mendelssohn and a contemporary, unnamed Jewish opera composer (Meyerbeer) as examples to argue that while Jewish artists may achieve technical proficiency, their works ultimately fail to resonate deeply with the spirit of true artistry. This disconnect stems from an inherent outsider perspective that Jewish artists have towards European cultural traditions, which prevents them from creating art that genuinely reflects these traditions' spirit.

Wagner’s negative assessment of Meyerbeer's music was not in isolation, but was in fact in tune with the prevailing critical consensus in Germany at the time, according to which Meyerbeer's works displayed "rhythmic monotony and undue eclecticism, elevating contrived effect above genuine dramatic tension". Wagner accuses Meyerbeer's audience in Paris as seeking cheap distractions from their boredom, rather than desiring engagement with a real art that challenges and elevates them.

Wagner reflects on an emotional "instinctive repulsion" towards Jews that remains in European society at large despite high-minded liberal social emancipation efforts, and a lack of genuine integration or acceptance of Jews. Wagner argues this repulsion needs to be acknowledged and discussed, rather than suppressed and ignored, so once the specific details of its triggering are understood, could steps be taken to resolve the social friction between Jews and non-Jews.

Despite calls for understanding and reconciliation, the essay is rife with insulting and provocative antisemitism. Wagner harshly attacks the Hebrew language, speech patterns, and appearance of Jews as aesthetically unpleasing and unsuited for artistic expression. In one metaphor, Wagner suggests that just as worms consume a body after it has died, so do Jews take over a European culture's music after its native vitality has diminished.

== Reception of the 1850 article ==
NZM had a very small circulation, estimated at 1500–2000 readers. Despite Wagner's hoping to create a sensation and open public debate, the response was muted. A single letter of complaint was sent to Franz Brendel, the editor of NZM, from Mendelssohn's old colleague Ignaz Moscheles. He and ten other professors at the Leipzig Conservatory (founded by Mendelssohn in 1843) requested that Brendel resign from the conservatory's board. Brendel kept his position. The article was poorly received even amongst Wagner's associates, most notably composer Franz Liszt, who was embarrassed by the article and thought it to be a passing phase or mere fit of pique.

== The 1869 republishing ==
Seeking to explain to friends the source of the unprecedented hostility towards himself and his artwork by music critics in the press, Wagner republished his essay in 1869 under his own name along with expanded commentary on the original's purpose and reception. Some edits were made to the original 1850 text, toning down its offensive language.

Wagner defends his use of a pseudonym in the original publication of the essay, having wanted to prevent the discussion from being diverted to personal matters, which he believed would happen if his real name was attached. Despite this, Wagner was soon recognized as the essay's author.

According to Wagner, while the original essay itself was ignored in an effort to stifle the conversation it sought to provoke, critics pivoted to attacking him in other areas, such as his other published art writings and stage works, in a "reverse persecution" by the Jewish intelligentsia which Wagner asserts controls the press. This included the significant mocking of himself and Liszt as the "prophets" of the "Music of the Future" in the newspapers, led by music critic Eduard Hanslick, who initially supported Wagner but later turned on him around 1854, with his publication of On the Beautiful in Music. Hanslick's theory of aesthetic beauty based on formal structure, which Wagner derides in his essay as "Jewish", was at odds with Wagner's own theories based on relatively formless passionate expression.

Wagner argues at length against Hanslick's "Music Judaism", which includes not just Jewish musicians but any composer who adopts this diluted style. He cites Robert Schumann as a composer whose youthful and spirited compositions turned superficial and pretentious in later years due to the influence of "Music Judaism".

In closing, Wagner appeals to the Jewish people directly, acknowledging the significant talents and virtues within Jewish society and suggesting that the oppression faced by the German spirit under Judaism is even more burdensome for the Jews themselves. Wagner expresses a hope, albeit faint, that open criticism of their relationship with Judaism might encourage even those within the Jewish community to fight for their "true emancipation". He argues for the necessity of openly addressing the challenges of assimilating the Jewish people into German culture, not to halt cultural decline through exclusion, but to foster a shared development towards higher human qualities.

== Reception of the 1869 article and aftermath ==
Once again many of Wagner's supporters were troubled by the essay's provocation. By this time, Wagner was a well-known public figure and the publication brought many responses in the press. Productions of Die Meistersinger von Nürnberg were shelved, and a Berlin production of Lohengrin was cancelled.

In the final decades of his life, Wagner's writings shifted away from overt political polemics, including his earlier antisemitic essays, and increasingly reflected metaphysical and philosophical concerns. Influenced by the philosophy of Schopenhauer and aspects of Indian religions such as Buddhism and Hinduism, Wagner developed the idea of Weltenwahn ("world-delusion" or "world-madness"). This concept, which bears some resemblance to the notion of Maya in Indian thought, described the illusory nature of the material world and the suffering caused by attachment, desire, and the pursuit of power. Wagner named his final residence in Bayreuth Wahnfried ("peace from delusion"), a symbolic expression of his aspiration for inner liberation. The theme of Wahn (German for delusion or madness) is a recurring element in his later music dramas, including Tristan, Die Meistersinger, and Parsifal, each of which explores different dimensions of illusion, enlightenment, and spiritual transformation.

Wagner writes in his late essay "Know Thyself" (Erkenne dich Selbst, 1881) that this "madness" arises from within a supposedly Judaized German society, and that once society has woken up, will there "be no more Jews". This subject is explored in his final opera, Parsifal.

Wagner distanced himself from the racial antisemitic movements growing in the late 19th century at the time, writing in his private letters:

From the modern antisemitic movement I stand completely distant. In an upcoming issue of the Bayreuth Blätter there will appear an article ["Know Thyself"] by me that ardently announces that it will actually be impossible for me to associate myself with that movement.

After Wagner's death in 1883, racialist antisemites such as the British-born Houston Stewart Chamberlain and Winifred Williams would descend on Bayreuth and its annual festival, taking it over, expelling Jewish musicians, and transforming it into a theater for the Nazis to subject Wagner's stage works to racist interpretations, with Adolf Hitler appearing there often as an honored guest.

== Recent reception ==
Das Judenthum would not create the serious controversy Wagner sought to provoke until the 1950s and 1960s, when scholars began researching a possible link between Wagner and his works with the philosophy and policies of Nazi Germany, most notably the Final Solution resulting in the Holocaust.

Hitler was known to be an enthusiastic admirer of Wagner's music, and the music was frequently played during Nazi party rallies (along with the music of other German composers) as exemplifying German cultural supremacy. While Hitler owned several of Wagner's music manuscripts as prized possessions, there is no evidence Hitler and other Nazi leadership members read Das Judenthum or were even aware of its existence. As the essay was largely regarded as an embarrassment to the early Wagnerites, there was just one reprint of the essay in Weimar in 1914, before the Nazis came to power. During the Nazi era there were two further publications: in Berlin in 1934 and in Leipzig in 1939. Neither of these appear to have been large editions with significant readership.

However, Nazi musicologist Karl Blessinger drew upon Wagner's anti-semitic ideas and language in publications during the Nazi era and Hitler came to use the Wagner-coined phrase of "Jewification" ("Verjudung") in Mein Kampf.

The essay has since served as an important document to understand the nature of Wagner's antisemitic worldview and whether this antisemitism is present in his stage works. Scholars such as Theodor Adorno have asserted that it is present, but this is strongly disputed by others. The topic remains under considerable debate in both academia and amongst the opera-going public. With a few controversial exceptions, Wagner has not been publicly performed in what is today the modern state of Israel since 1938.

Some writers such as Bryan Magee have sought to make a qualified defense of Wagner's originality of thought in Das Judenthum, despite acknowledging its malevolence. However, other scholars argue a more comprehensive consideration of the essay's contents weakens his argument. Music historians have written to debunk the anti-Jewish thesis and arguments appearing in Wagner's essay.

== Sources ==
- Conway, David (2012). Jewry in Music: Entry to the Profession from the Enlightenment to Richard Wagner, Cambridge: Cambridge University Press. ISBN 978-1-107-01538-8
- Deathridge, John (2008). Wagner:Beyond Good and Evil. Berkeley: University of California Press. ISBN 978-0-520-25453-4
- Dennis, David R. (1996). Beethoven in German Politics, 1870–1989, New Haven and London: Yale University Press.
- Evans, Richard J. (2005). The Third Reich in Power, 1933-1939, The Penguin Press, ISBN 1-59420-074-2.
- Fischer, Jens Malte (2000). Richard Wagners 'Das Judentum in der Musik' . Frankfurt: Insel Verlag . ISBN 978-3-458-34317-2 (in German)
- Fontane, Theodor tr. Hugh Rorrison and Helen Chambers, (1995). Effi Briest. London: Penguin.
- Guttman, Robert W. (1990). Richard Wagner: The Man, his Mind and his Music. San Digeo: Harcourt, Brace, Jovanovich. ISBN 0-15-677615-4
- Karlsson, Jonas (2013). "Profession and Faith", in The Wagner Journal, vol. 7 no. 1. ISSN 1755-0173.
- Katz, Jacob (1986). The Darker side of genius: Richard Wagner's anti-semitism. Hanover: Brandeis University Press. ISBN 0-87451-368-5.
- Magee, Bryan (1988). Aspects of Wagner. Oxford: Oxford University Press. ISBN 0-19-284012-6
- Millington, Barry (ed.) (2001) The Wagner Compendium: A Guide to Wagner's Life and Music, revised edition. London: Thames and Hudson Ltd. ISBN 0-02-871359-1
- Rose, Paul Lawrence (1992). Wagner: Race and Revolution. London 1992. ISBN 0-571-17888-X
- Spotts, Frederick (1996). Bayreuth: A History of the Wagner Festival, Yale University Press ISBN 0-300-06665-1
- Wagner, Richard (1869). Das Judenthum in der Musik (1869) – WikisourceDas Judenthum in der Musik], accessed 7 March 2024.
- Wagner, Richard (1881). Bayreuther BlätterErkenne dich selbst], accessed 9 March 2024.
- Wagner, Richard, tr. and ed. Stewart Spencer and Barry Millington (1978). Selected Letters of Richard Wagner, London: J. M. Dent and Sons. ISBN 9780460046435
- Wagner, Richard, ed. Joachim Bergfeld, tr. George Bird (1980). The Diary of Richard Wagner: The Brown Book 1865–1882. London: Victor Gollancz and Co.. ISBN 0575026286
- Wagner, Richard, tr. W. Ashton Ellis (1995). Judaism in Music and other Essays. London. ISBN 0-8032-9766-1
- Wagner, Richard, ed. D. Borchmeyer (1983). Richard Wagner: Dichtungen und Schriften Jubiläumsaufgabe, 10 vols. Insel Verlag, Frankfurt (in German)
