= William Ashton Ellis =

English translator and biographer (1852–1919)

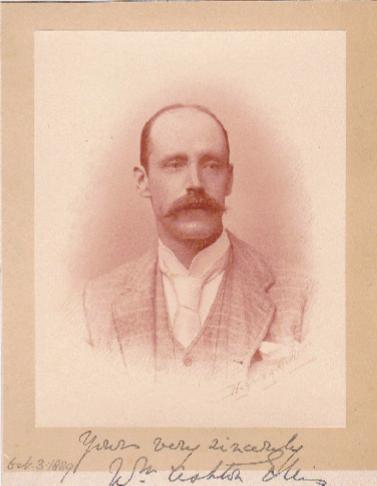
Photograph of William Ashton Ellis, c. 1889

William Ashton Ellis (20 August 1852 – 2 January 1919) was an English doctor and theosophist. He is remembered for translating the complete prose works of Richard Wagner.

== Life ==
Born in London, the son of the surgeon Robert Ellis (1823–1877), he was originally intended to follow a medical career. His interest in theosophy (he was personally acquainted with Madame Blavatsky) and his devotion to the music of Wagner combined in 1887 to lead him to resign his job as a medical officer, and to become the editor of the journal of the London Wagner Society, "The Meister". Ellis wrote that Wagner's music and ideas would free mankind "from the tightening grip of crushing scientific materialism" of his era: "at no time [had] there been such a widespread desire to search all things, and to bring forth some of the hidden secrets of that which is above and beyond matter."

Ellis's own articles in "The Meister" included reviews of material by other writers on Wagner, (including the biography by Houston Stewart Chamberlain), a review of the letters of Franz Liszt, and an exposé of the mendacious account of Wagner's early life by Ferdinand Praeger.

In 1891 the Society commissioned Ellis to translate the biography of Wagner by Carl Friedrich Glasenapp, but after the first volume, dissatisfied with Glasenapp's work, he began to rewrite and expand it, under his own name. Having reached the sixth volume in 1909 (and taking Wagner's life only through his first 46 years, to 1859) he discontinued this project. In the meantime, lacking any regular source of income, thanks to the efforts of George Bernard Shaw, he had been awarded a Civil List pension in recognition of his work.

In 1915 he was able to return to his work as a medical officer (due to labour shortages during World War I). During the War he published articles in The Musical Times seeking to exonerate Wagner from German "Barbarism." He died in London in 1919, possibly as a victim of the 1918-1919 influenza epidemic.

In his English translations of Wagner's prose essays, Ellis determined "to do what Thomas Carlyle did for Goethe". They have remained a standard, even though Ellis's tortuous phrasing (faithful to Wagner's original style) can make them hard work.

== Works ==
Contemporary publication of Ashton's Wagner translations include:

- vol. 1 The Artwork of the Future and Other Works, Lincoln (NE) and London: University of Nebraska Press. ISBN 978-0-8032-9752-4.
- vol. 2 Opera and Drama, Lincoln (NE) and London: University of Nebraska Press. ISBN 978-0-8032-9765-4.
- vol. 3 Judaism in Music and Other Essays, Lincoln (NE) and London: University of Nebraska Press. ISBN 978-0-8032-9766-1.
- vol. 4 Art and Politics, Lincoln (NE) and London: University of Nebraska Press. ISBN 978-0-8032-9774-6.
- vol. 5 Actors and Singers, Lincoln (NE) and London: University of Nebraska Press. ISBN 978-0-8032-9773-9.
- vol. 6 Religion and Art, Lincoln (NE) and London: University of Nebraska Press. ISBN 978-0-8032-9764-7.
- vol. 7 Pilgrimage to Beethoven and Other Essays, Lincoln (NE) and London: University of Nebraska Press. ISBN 978-0-8032-9763-0.
- vol. 8 Jesus of Nazareth and Other Writings, Lincoln (NE) and London: University of Nebraska Press. ISBN 978-0-8032-9780-7.
- My life, London (1911)

An enlarged edition of Ashton's translation of "The Family Letters of Richard Wagner", with an introduction by the music historian John Deathridge, was published in 1991. (London:Palgrave Macmillan).
