= Wieland der Schmied (Hitler) =

Adolf Hitler's Opera

Wieland der Schmied (English: Wayland the Smith) is the unfinished juvenilia opera by Adolf Hitler that he began around 1905, in his early 20s.

From 1907 to 1908, Hitler would unsuccessfully apply to the Vienna Academy of Fine Arts twice. During this time, his fascination with German composer Richard Wagner began, a relationship which would only deepen as his German nationalism grew. The opera was modelled after Wagner's unfinished version of the same name. There is only one surviving piece of sheet music from the work, a piano sketch made by Hitler's childhood friend and music conductor August Kubizek. In recollection about the work in his 1953 memoir Adolf Hitler, mein Jugendfreund (Young Hitler, the Story of Our Friendship), Kubizek marvelled at Hitler's passion for "the beauty, the nobility, the grandeur of the art".

The manuscript was included in the 2021 "Young Hitler: the Formative Years of a Dictator" exhibition held at the Nordico museum in Linz, Austria.
