= Mein Leben (Wagner) =

Autobiography of the German composer Richard Wagner

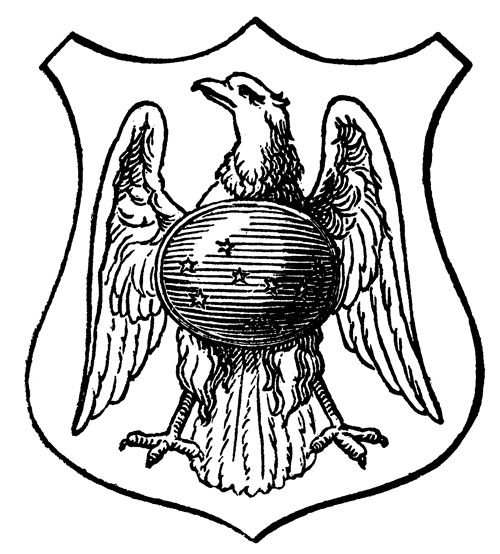
Wagner family coat of arms devised for Mein Leben (see text, The frontispiece)

Mein Leben (German for "My Life") is the autobiography of the composer Richard Wagner, covering the years from his birth in 1813 to 1864.

== Origins ==
On 17 July 1865 in Munich, Wagner began dictating Mein Leben to his then mistress Cosima von Bülow, whom he married in 1870. King Ludwig II of Bavaria asked him to write the memoir in a letter dated 28 May 1865:

You would cause me inexpressible happiness if you were to give me an account of your intellectual and spiritual development and of the external events of your life as well.

Wagner was indebted to the king, who had rescued him from a life of exile and financial embarrassment in the previous year. At around the same time in 1864, Wagner had heard the news of the death of his professional nemesis, the composer Giacomo Meyerbeer. The book therefore ends on a 'triumphant' note with the exaltation of Wagner at the death of his supposed 'enemy.'

The book is amongst the most readable of Wagner's prose writings, generally free of the complex syntax that is typical of his theoretical works. His frequently tempestuous career, friendships and controversies make for a racy and often surprisingly frank account. However,

[t]he subjective quality [...] emerges most clearly [...] in the casual and sometimes condescending tone [Wagner] adopts towards contemporaries [...], and it is present in the attacks on other composers of the age, above all on Meyerbeer.

Nonetheless, the book is a major source for both Wagner's life and for the world of music and culture in which he began his career.

== The first publication ==
The final section of the book, covering 1861 to 1864, was not completed until 1880. However, Wagner and Cosima had already determined to print a few copies for private circulation. The first volume was printed in 1870 in an edition of fifteen. Volumes 2 and 3 were printed in 1872 and 1875, in editions of eighteen copies. Wagner recruited the young Friedrich Nietzsche to act as proof-reader and to see the book through a press in Basel. Volume 4 was printed in 1880 in Bayreuth.

There was no intention to distribute the book beyond a small circle of trusted friends; for this reason, rumours began to grow regarding the contents. Cosima herself was worried about some of the revelations in Mein Leben – in a letter to the King she wrote:

Had I not constantly begged him to say everything, however painful it might be, there is quite a lot he would not have set down. I was bold enough to assert that you too would have asked him to do it, and so he plunges deep into a sea of unedifying memories.

This is despite the fact that Wagner, in dictating to Cosima, had watered down some of his past, particularly his love life and his involvement in the 1849 Revolution in Dresden. An extra copy of volumes 1 to 3 struck off by the Basel printer was acquired by the American collector Mrs. Burrell in 1892, and she was so surprised by what she read that she suspected it of being a forgery.

== The frontispiece ==
Following a suggestion by Nietzsche, Wagner included a symbolic coat of arms as a frontispiece to the first volume. This showed a vulture (German: Geier) holding a shield with the constellation of The Plough (Wagen); thus referring both to Wagner's natural father Carl and to his beloved stepfather, Ludwig Geyer. This was later the source for Nietzsche's taunt (in a footnote in his 1888 book The Case of Wagner: A Musician's Problem), that Wagner might have been Jewish, as 'a Geyer (vulture) is almost an Adler (eagle)'. Both 'Geyer' and 'Adler' were common Jewish surnames, although Ludwig Geyer was not in fact Jewish. However, as Nietzsche was at the time one of the very few who had read Mein Leben and had been a close associate of the composer, many assumed (as Nietzsche doubtless intended) that Wagner had revealed a Jewish paternity in the autobiography, which was not the case.

== Subsequent publications ==
Over the years, and particularly after Wagner's death, Cosima attempted to recall all the copies that had been distributed. Many of these were apparently burnt by Cosima. The first generally published edition did not appear until 1911, possibly to quell the rumours which had grown about the contents; this was cut and adapted by the Wagner family to cover up indiscreet comments or actions by Wagner which appeared discreditable. The first complete public edition appeared in 1963 (in German). The edition translated by Andrew Gray is based on this and is the first complete English translation.
