= Wieland der Schmied (Bella) =

Opera by Ján Levoslav Bella

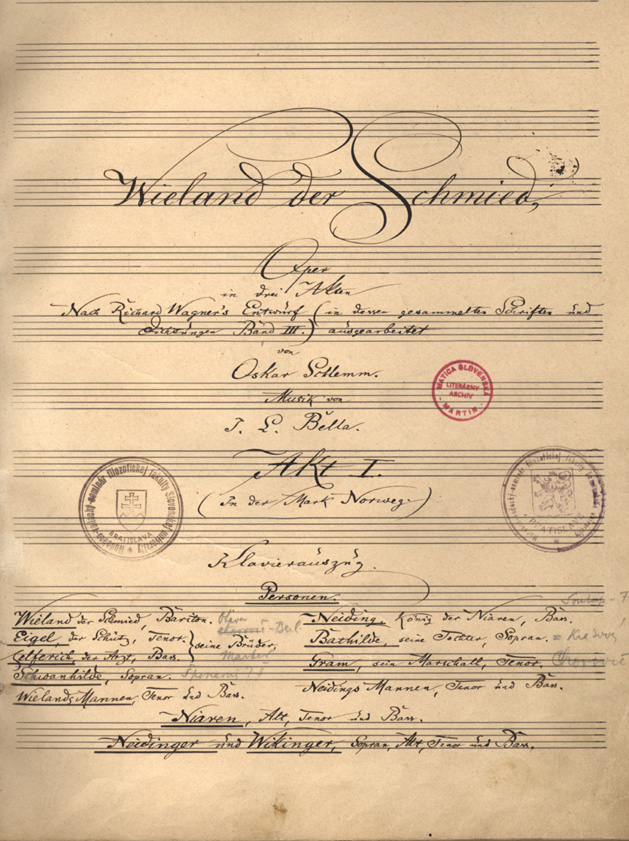
Titlepage of the manuscript of Bella's Wieland der Schmied

Wieland der Schmied (Wieland the Smith; Slovak: Kováč Wieland) is an opera in three acts by Ján Levoslav Bella first performed in 1926, to a libretto by Oskar Schlemm based on an original libretto draft by Richard Wagner.

== The libretto ==
Wagner was motivated by his enthusiasm for the Romeo and Juliet symphony of Hector Berlioz to create a libretto which might serve for a production at the Paris Opéra, with music perhaps to be written by Berlioz or by himself. The draft, which is mostly in prose, was written between December 1849 and March 1850. It was published as an appendix to Wagner's essay The Art-Work of the Future as an example of the ideals to which such art-works should aspire - "a glorious Saga which long ago the raw, uncultured Folk of old-time Germany indited for no other reason than that of inner, free, Necessity". However it was never set as an opera by Wagner or any other composer before Bella.

== The opera ==
Oskar Schlemm adapted Wagner's outline to a full libretto (in German) for Bella, who wrote the music for it between 1880 and 1890, during which period he was living in Sibiu (now in Romania). The opera was eventually produced in Bratislava at the Slovak National Theatre on 28 April 1926, conducted by Oskar Nedbal, in a Slovak translation by Vladimir Roy, under the title Kováč Wieland. This was the first ever staging of an original opera in Slovak. The composer was in the audience, and the Slovak newspaper Slovenská politika reported "everyone will understand the magnitude of the moment and the tremor that seized us when the sweet singing of a Slovak word sounded from the stage."

== Roles ==
- Wieland, a smith (baritone)
- Eigel, a hunter (tenor), and Helferich, a healer (bass), his brothers
- Schwanhilde (soprano)
- Neiding, King of the Niar (bass)
- Bathilda, his daughter (mezzo-soprano)
- Gram, his marshal (tenor)
- King Rothar (silent role)
- Chorus: Friends of Wieland, Gram's retinue, Neiding's retinue, Niar, Vikings.

== Story ==
The original legend of Wieland is told in Old Norse sources such as Völundarkviða (a poem in the Poetic Edda) and Þiðreks saga. In them, Wieland is a smith, one of three brothers who had married swan maidens. Wieland is enslaved by a king. He takes revenge by killing the king's sons and then escapes by crafting a winged cloak and flying away.

In Wagner's libretto, Schwanhilde is the daughter of a marriage between a mortal woman and a fairy king, who forbids his wife to ask about his origins; on her asking him he vanishes. Schwanhilde and her sisters are however able to fly as swans. But wounded by a spear, Schwanhilde falls to earth and is rescued by the master-craftsman Wieland, and marries him, putting aside her wings and her magic ring of power. Wieland's enemies, the Neidings, under Princess Bathilde, steal the ring, kidnap Schwanhilde and destroy Wieland's home. When Wieland searches for Schwanhilde, they entrap and cripple him. However he fashions wings for himself and escapes with Schwanhilde as the house of the Neidings is destroyed.
