= The Artwork of the Future =

Literary work

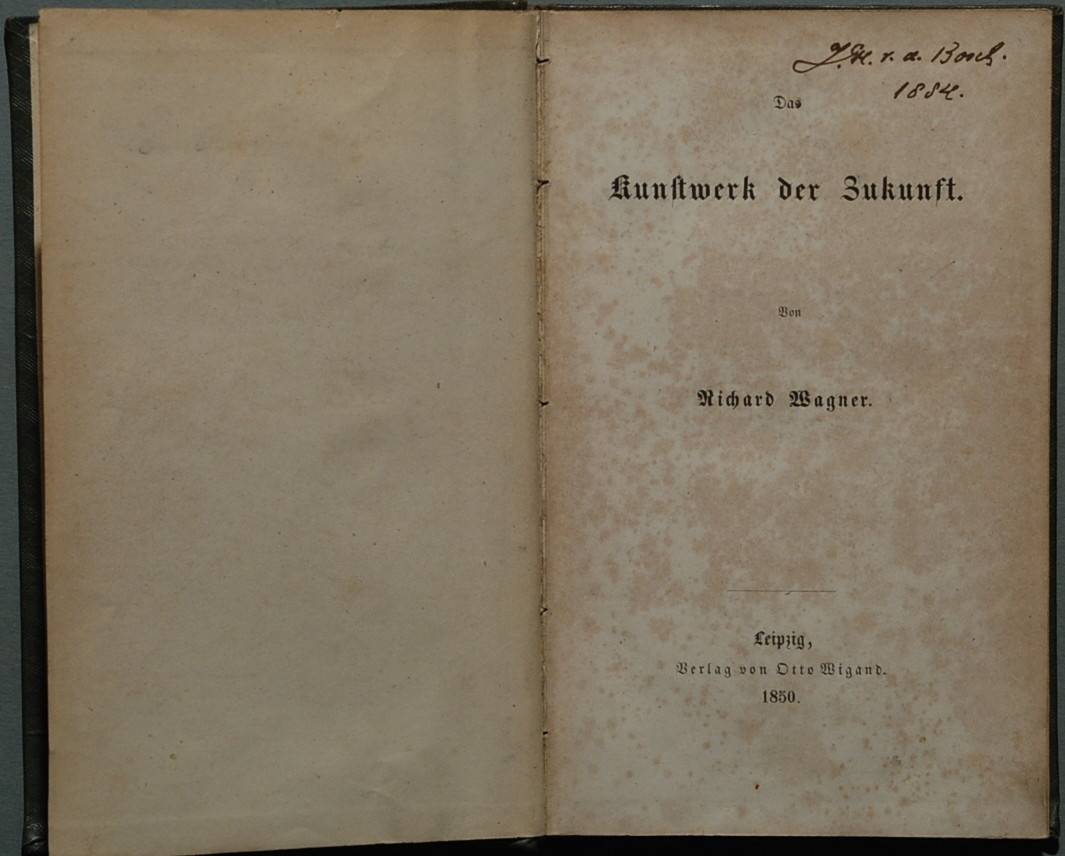
Titlepage of the first edition

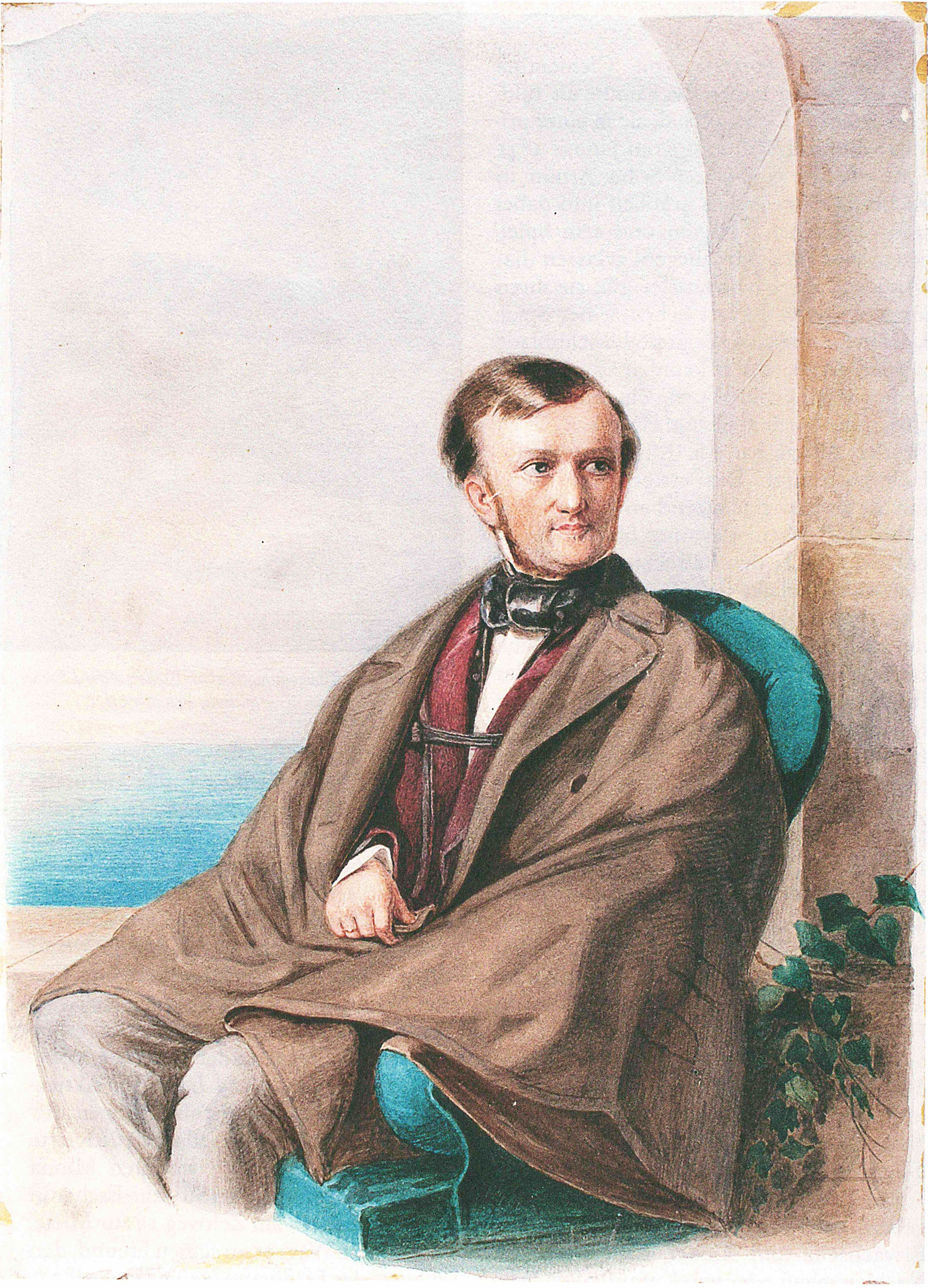
Wagner in 1853

"The Artwork of the Future" (German: Das Kunstwerk der Zukunft) is a long essay written by Richard Wagner, first published in 1849 in Leipzig, in which he sets out some of his ideals on the topics of art in general and music drama in particular.

== Background ==
The essay is one of a series which Wagner produced in a period of intensive writing following his exile after the Dresden May uprising of 1849. It follows "Art and Revolution" and precedes "Jewishness in Music", developing the ideas of the one and prefiguring some of the issues of the other.

Wagner wrote the whole essay over about two months in Zürich. He wrote to his friend Uhlig in November 1849, 'This will be the last of my literary works'. On this, as on many other matters in his life, Wagner was to change his mind. The essay is dedicated to the philosopher Ludwig Feuerbach, whose works (perhaps particularly Principles of the Philosophy of the Future), inspired some of its ideas. In September and October 1849, Wagner had read both Feuerbach's Reflections on Death and Immortality and his The Essence of Christianity. Wagner's biographer Ernest Newman opined that Wagner's prose style in this essay and others was also heavily influenced by Feuerbach, who was 'constitutionally prone to the antithetical'; whilst noting that within a few years Wagner rejected Feuerbach's philosophy for that of Schopenhauer.

The title of the essay was to haunt Wagner; thereafter his opponents were to taunt him as a self-appointed prophet of 'the music of the future'.

Immediately following the essay Wagner dashed off a draft libretto, mostly in prose, Wieland der Schmied (Wieland the Smith), outlined at the close of the essay itself, which he thought appropriate as material for his ideal music-drama, and originally intended to develop for production in Paris. However he abandoned this plan, and the draft eventually became the basis for the first Slovak opera, Kovac Wiland, by Ján Levoslav Bella, (produced in Bratislava in 1924).

== Content ==
Wagner begins, 'As Man stands to Nature, so stands Art to Man.' Man, or more particularly the Volk (the community of 'men who feel a common and collective want') creates Art to fill that want. Those who feel no want are outsiders to the Volk and crave only pointless luxury – true Art thus comes only from the atavistic needs of the Volk. When luxury (by which Wagner implies base entertainment posing as true art – i.e. Grand Opera and its like) has been abolished by the Volk they will be able to join to create the Artwork of the Future.

Wagner goes on to talk of the three basic elements of art, which he lists as 'Dance, Tone [i.e. music] and Poetry' which were originally united in ancient Greek drama (as extolled by Wagner in Art and Revolution). Modern attempts to unite these give rise to the 'unnatural abortion, the Oratorio', and to the 'shameless insolence' of contemporary opera Only when these and other tawdry entertainments are swept aside will the Artwork of the Future arise.

This artwork will command all the arts – 'Architecture can set before herself no higher task than to frame' it, (an early prefiguring of the Bayreuth Festspielhaus). The Artwork of the Future will of course bring forth the Artist of the Future who will be 'without a doubt the Poet.' Wagner points out that it is a matter of indifference whether this be a word-poet or a tone-poet, perhaps hinting at exactly what sort of a fellow this Artist must be. However the Darsteller (translated by Ellis as 'performer' but perhaps meaning rather the 'purveyor') of the Artwork will be a communal matter, a 'fellowship of all artists'. In this communal aspect of the Artwork of the Future, Newman sees an anticipation of the Bayreuth Festival concept.

The essay closes with a précis of Wieland the Smith.

== Bibliography ==
- M. Gregor-Dellin, Wagner au jour le jour, Paris, 1976
- Barry Millington (ed.), The Wagner Compendium, London, 1992 ISBN 0-500-28274-9
- Ernest Newman, The Life of Richard Wagner: Volume II, 1848–1860, Cambridge, 1976 ISBN 0-521-29095-3
- Richard Wagner, trans. and ed. W. Ashton Ellis, The Art-Work of the Future, and other works, Lincoln and London, 1993 ISBN 0-8032-9752-1
- Richard Wagner, trans. Emma Warner, The Artwork of the Future, London, 2013 ISSN 1755-0173 [print]; ISSN 1755-0181 [online]
