= Der Ring des Nibelungen =

Cycle of four operas by Richard Wagner

- Music dramas by Richard Wagner
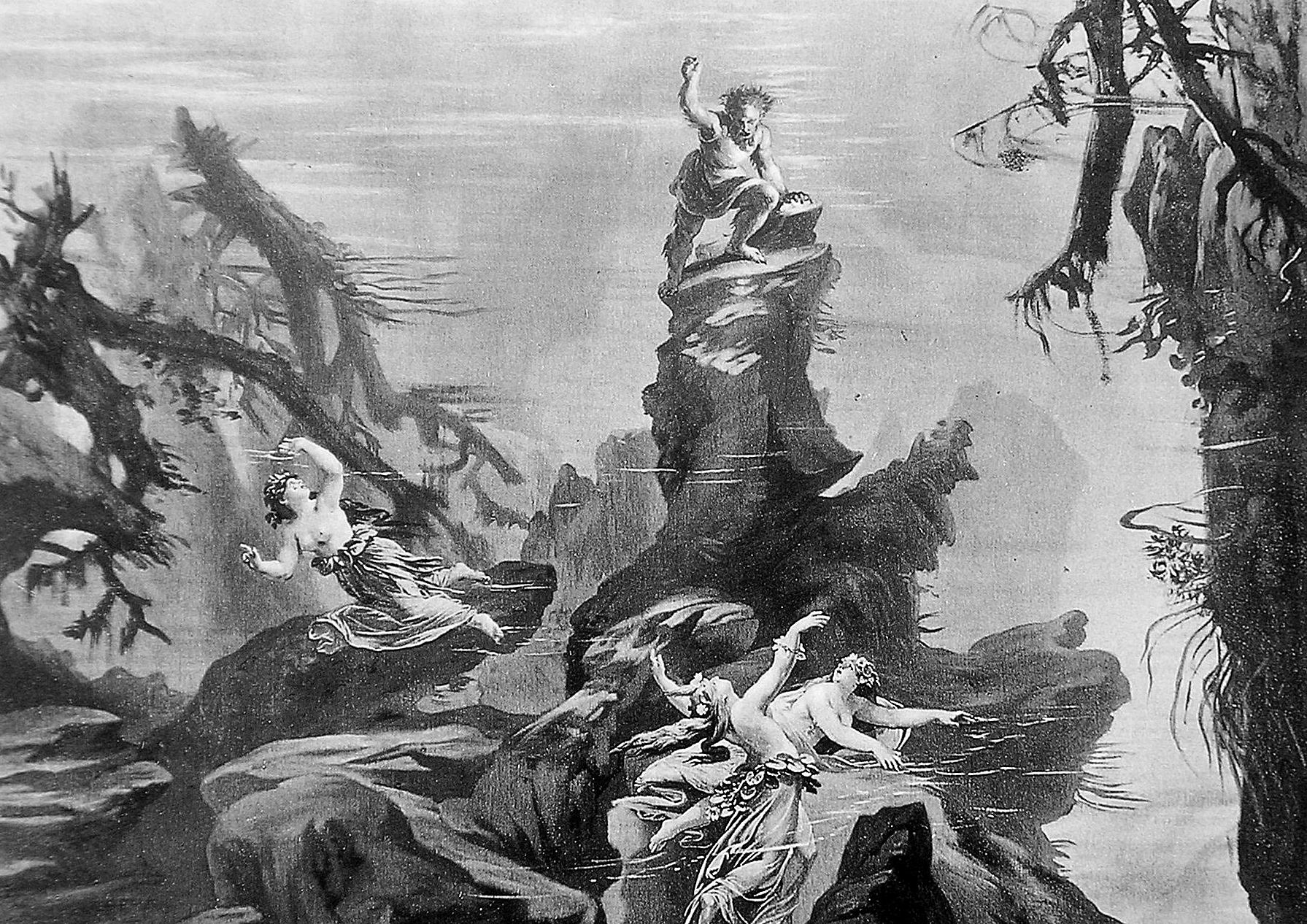
- Scene 1 of Das Rheingold from the first Bayreuth Festival production of the Bühnenfestspiel in 1876
- Translation: The Ring of the Nibelung
- Librettist: Richard Wagner
- Language: German
- Premiere: Individually: 22 September 1869 Das Rheingold; 26 June 1870 Die Walküre; As a cycle: 13 August 1876 Das Rheingold; 14 August 1876 Die Walküre; 16 August 1876 Siegfried; 17 August 1876 Götterdämmerung; Bayreuth Festspielhaus

Der Ring des Nibelungen (The Ring of the Nibelung), WWV 86, is a cycle of four German-language epic music dramas composed by Richard Wagner. The works are based loosely on characters from Germanic heroic legend, namely Norse legendary sagas and the Nibelungenlied. The composer termed the cycle a "Bühnenfestspiel" (stage festival play), structured in three days preceded by a Vorabend ("preliminary evening"). It is often referred to as the Ring cycle, Wagner's Ring, or simply The Ring.

Wagner wrote the libretto and music over the course of about twenty-six years, from 1848 to 1874. The four parts that constitute the Ring cycle are, in sequence:

- Das Rheingold (The Rhinegold)
- Die Walküre (The Valkyrie)
- Siegfried
- Götterdämmerung (Twilight of the Gods)

Individual works of the sequence are often performed separately, and indeed the operas contain dialogues that mention events in the previous operas, so that a viewer could watch any of them without having watched the previous parts and still understand the plot. However, Wagner intended them to be performed in series. The first performance as a cycle opened the first Bayreuth Festival in 1876, beginning with Das Rheingold on 13 August and ending with Götterdämmerung on 17 August. Opera stage director Anthony Freud stated that Der Ring des Nibelungen "marks the high-water mark of our art form, the most massive challenge any opera company can undertake."

== Title ==
Wagner's title is most literally rendered in English as The Ring of the Nibelung. The Nibelung of the title is the dwarf Alberich, and the ring in question is the one he fashions from the Rhinegold. The title therefore denotes "Alberich's Ring".

== Content ==
The cycle is a work of extraordinary scale. A full performance of the cycle takes place over four nights at the opera, with a total playing time of about 15 hours, depending on the conductor's pacing. The first and shortest work, Das Rheingold, has no interval and is one continuous piece of music typically lasting around two and a half hours, while the final and longest, Götterdämmerung, takes up to five hours, excluding intervals. The cycle is modelled after ancient Greek dramas that were presented as three tragedies and one satyr play. The Ring proper begins with Die Walküre and ends with Götterdämmerung, with Rheingold as a prelude. Wagner called Das Rheingold a Vorabend or "Preliminary Evening", and Die Walküre, Siegfried and Götterdämmerung were subtitled First Day, Second Day and Third Day, respectively, of the trilogy proper.

The scale and scope of the story is epic. It follows the struggles of gods, heroes, and several mythical creatures over the eponymous magic ring that grants domination over the entire world. The drama and intrigue continue through three generations of protagonists, until the final cataclysm at the end of Götterdämmerung.

The music of the cycle is thick and richly textured, and grows in complexity as the cycle proceeds. Wagner wrote for an orchestra of gargantuan proportions, including a greatly enlarged brass section with instruments such as the Wagner tuba, bass trumpet and contrabass trombone. Remarkably, he uses a chorus only relatively briefly, in acts 2 and 3 of Götterdämmerung, and then mostly of men with just a few women. He eventually had a purpose-built theatre constructed, the Bayreuth Festspielhaus, in which to perform this work. The theatre has a special stage that blends the huge orchestra with the singers' voices, allowing them to sing at a natural volume. The result was that the singers did not have to strain themselves vocally during the long performances.

== List of characters ==
Gods	Mortals	Valkyries	Rhinemaidens, Giants & Nibelungs	Other characters
Wotan: Fricka's husband, king of the gods and god of knowledge (bass-baritone); Fricka: Wotan's wife, queen of the gods and goddess of marriage (mezzo-soprano); Freia: Fricka's sister and goddess of love and youth (soprano); Froh: Fricka's brother and god of fertility (tenor); Donner: Fricka's brother and god of weather (baritone); Erda: The Norns and Valkyries' mother and goddess of earth, wisdom and prophecy (contralto); The Norns: Erda's daughters and the goddesses of fate (contralto, mezzo-soprano, soprano); Loge: demigod of cunning and fire (tenor)	Wälsungs: Siegmund: Wotan's mortal son, Sieglinde's twin brother and Siegfried's father (tenor); Sieglinde: Wotan's mortal daughter, Siegmund's twin sister and Siegfried's mother (soprano); Siegfried: Siegmund and Sieglinde's son and Brünnhilde's lover (heldentenor); Neidings: Hunding: Sieglinde's husband and king of the Neidings (bass); Gibichungs: Gunther: Gibich and Grimhilda's son, Gutrune's brother and king of the Gibichungs (baritone); Gutrune: Gibich and Grimhilda's daughter and Gunther's sister (soprano); Hagen: Alberich and Grimhilda's son and Gunther and Gutrune's maternal half-brother (bass); A male choir of Gibichung vassals and a small female choir of Gibichung women	Brünnhilde: Wotan and Erda's immortal daughter and Siegfried's lover (soprano); Gerhilde: Wotan and Erda's immortal daughter and Brünnhilde's sister (soprano); Ortlinde: Wotan and Erda's immortal daughter and Brünnhilde's sister (soprano); Waltraute: Wotan and Erda's immortal daughter and Brünnhilde's sister (mezzo-soprano); Schwertleite: Wotan and Erda's immortal daughter and Brünnhilde's sister (contralto); Helmwige: Wotan and Erda's immortal daughter and Brünnhilde's sister (soprano); Siegrune: Wotan and Erda's immortal daughter and Brünnhilde's sister (mezzo-soprano); Grimgerde: Wotan and Erda's immortal daughter and Brünnhilde's sister (contralto); Rossweisse: Wotan and Erda's immortal daughter and Brünnhilde's sister (mezzo-soprano)	Rhinemaidens: Woglinde: Wellgunde and Flosshilde's sister and guardian of Rhine gold (soprano); Wellgunde: Woglinde and Flosshilde's sister and guardian of Rhine gold (soprano); Flosshilde: Woglinde and Wellgunde's sister and guardian of Rhine gold (mezzo-soprano); Giants: Fasolt: Fafner's brother and king of the giants (bass-baritone/high bass); Fafner: Fasolt's brother and later turned into a dragon (bass); Nibelungs: Alberich: Mime's brother and Hagen's father (bass-baritone); Mime: Alberich's brother and Siegfried's foster father (tenor)	The Voice of a Woodbird: a parlant bird and Siegfried's ally (soprano)

=== List of characters by appearance ===
Character	Das Rheingold	Die Walküre	Siegfried	Götterdämmerung
Wotan	Yes	Yes	Yes (Note: Also known as The Wanderer.)	No
Fricka	Yes	Yes	No	No
Loge	Yes	No	No	No
Freia	Yes	No	No	No
Donner	Yes	No	No	No
Froh	Yes	No	No	No
Erda	Yes	No	Yes	No
Woglinde	Yes	No	No	Yes
Wellgunde	Yes	No	No	Yes
Flosshilde	Yes	No	No	Yes
Fasolt	Yes	No	No	No
Fafner	Yes	No	Yes	No
Alberich	Yes	No	Yes	Yes
Mime	Yes	No	Yes	No
Siegmund	No	Yes	No	No
Sieglinde	No	Yes	No	No
Hunding	No	Yes	No	No
Brünnhilde	No	Yes	Yes	Yes
Gerhilde	No	Yes	No	No
Ortlinde	No	Yes	No	No
Waltraute	No	Yes	No	Yes
Schwertleite	No	Yes	No	No
Helmwige	No	Yes	No	No
Siegrune	No	Yes	No	No
Grimgerde	No	Yes	No	No
Rossweisse	No	Yes	No	No
Siegfried	No	No	Yes	Yes
The Woodbird	No	No	Yes	No
The Norns	No	No	No	Yes
Gunther	No	No	No	Yes
Gutrune	No	No	No	Yes
Hagen	No	No	No	Yes
Vassals	No	No	No	Yes
Women	No	No	No	Yes

== Story ==
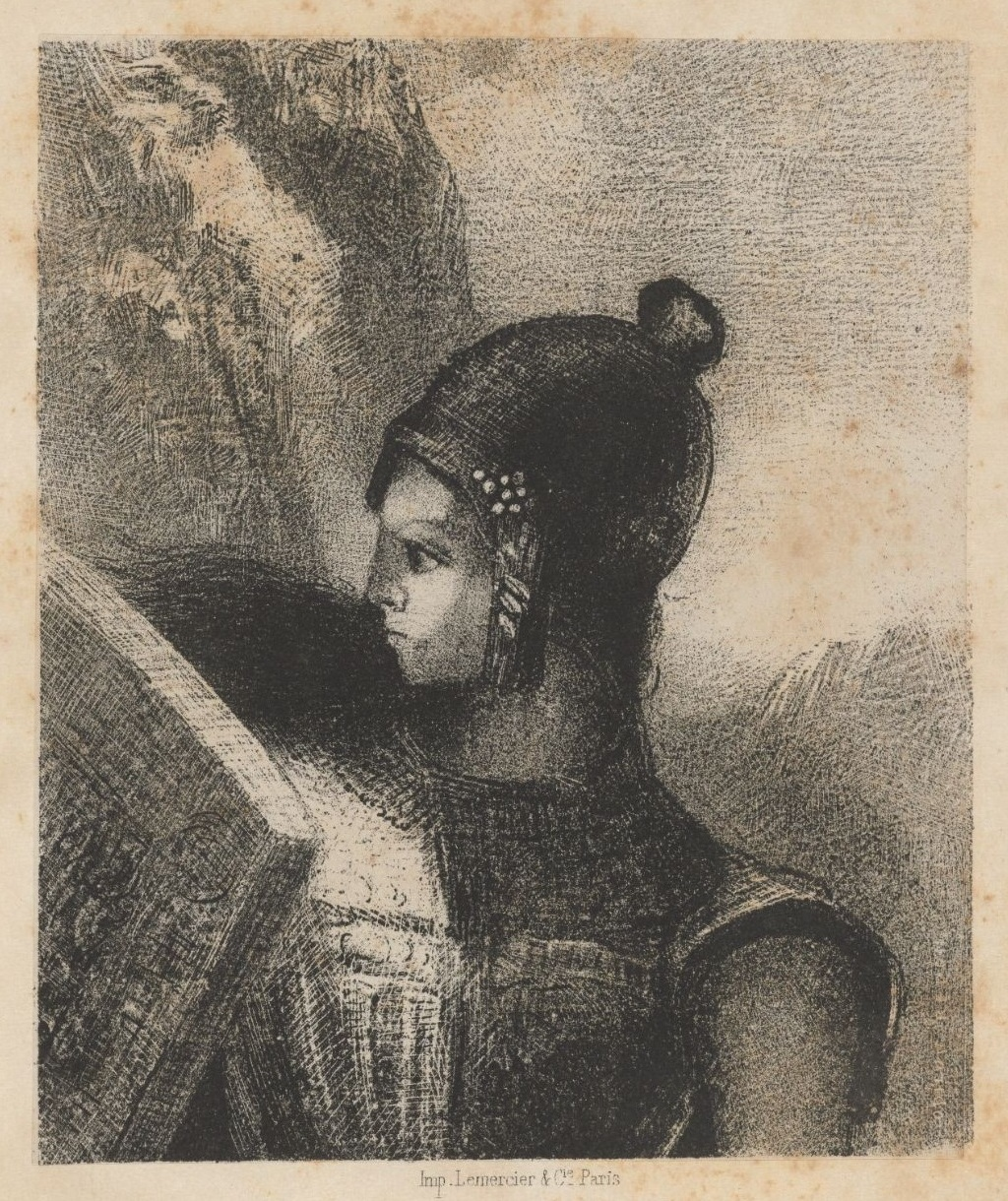
Illustration of Brünnhilde by Odilon Redon, 1885

The plot revolves around a magic ring that grants the power to rule the world, forged by the Nibelung dwarf Alberich from gold he stole from the Rhine maidens in the river Rhine. With the assistance of the god Loge, Wotan – the chief of the gods – steals the ring from Alberich, but is forced to hand it over to the giants Fafner and Fasolt in payment for building the home of the gods, Valhalla; otherwise they will take Freia, who provides the gods with the golden apples that keep them young. Wotan's schemes to regain the ring, spanning generations, drive much of the action in the story. His grandson, the mortal Siegfried, wins the ring by slaying Fafner (who slew Fasolt for the ring) – as Wotan intended – but is eventually betrayed and slain as a result of the intrigues of Alberich's son Hagen, who wants the ring for himself. Finally, the Valkyrie Brünnhilde – Siegfried's lover and Wotan's daughter, who lost her immortality for defying her father in an attempt to save Siegfried's father Siegmund – bequeaths the ring to the Rhine maidens as she commits suicide on Siegfried's funeral pyre. Hagen is drowned by the Rhine maidens as he attempts to recover the ring. In the process, the gods and Valhalla are destroyed by fire.

Wagner developed the story of the Ring by fusing elements from many Germanic and Scandinavian myths and folk-tales. The Old Norse Edda texts supplied much of the material for Das Rheingold, while Die Walküre was largely based on the Völsunga saga. Siegfried contains elements from the Eddur, the Völsunga saga and Thidrekssaga. The final Götterdämmerung draws from the 12th-century German poem, the Nibelungenlied, which appears to have been the original inspiration for the Ring.

The Ring has been the subject of myriad interpretations. For example, George Bernard Shaw, in The Perfect Wagnerite (1898), argues for a view of The Ring as an essentially socialist critique of industrial society and its abuses. Robert Donington in Wagner's Ring and Its Symbols (1963) interprets it in terms of Jungian psychology, as an account of the development of unconscious archetypes in the mind, leading towards individuation.

== Concept ==
In his earlier operas (up to and including Lohengrin) Wagner's style had been based, rather than on the Italian style of opera, on the German style as developed by Carl Maria von Weber, with elements of the grand opera style of Giacomo Meyerbeer. However he came to be dissatisfied with such a format as a means of artistic expression. He expressed this clearly in his essay "A Communication to My Friends" (1851), in which he condemned the majority of modern artists, in painting and in music, as "feminine ... the world of art close fenced from Life, in which Art plays with herself.' Where however the impressions of Life produce an overwhelming 'poetic force', we find the 'masculine, the generative path of Art'.

Wagner unfortunately found that his audiences were not willing to follow where he led them:

The public, by their enthusiastic reception of Rienzi and their cooler welcome of the Flying Dutchman, had plainly shown me what I must set before them if I sought to please. I completely undeceived their expectations; they left the theatre, after the first performance of Tannhäuser, [1845] in a confused and discontented mood. – The feeling of utter loneliness in which I now found myself, quite unmanned me... My Tannhäuser had appealed to a handful of intimate friends alone.

Finally Wagner announces:

I shall never write an Opera more. As I have no wish to invent an arbitrary title for my works, I will call them Dramas ...

I propose to produce my myth in three complete dramas, preceded by a lengthy Prelude (Vorspiel). ...

At a specially-appointed Festival, I propose, some future time, to produce those three Dramas with their Prelude, in the course of three days and a fore-evening. The object of this production I shall consider thoroughly attained, if I and my artistic comrades, the actual performers, shall within these four evenings succeed in artistically conveying my purpose to the true Emotional (not the Critical) Understanding of spectators who shall have gathered together expressly to learn it.

This is his first public announcement of the form of what would become the Ring cycle.

In accordance with the ideas expressed in his essays of the period 1849–51 (including the "Communication" but also Opera and Drama and "The Artwork of the Future"), the four parts of the Ring were originally conceived by Wagner to be free of the traditional operatic concepts of aria and operatic chorus. The Wagner scholar Curt von Westernhagen identified three important problems discussed in "Opera and Drama" which were particularly relevant to the Ring cycle: the problem of unifying verse stress with melody; the disjunctions caused by formal arias in dramatic structure and the way in which opera music could be organised on a different basis of organic growth and modulation; and the function of musical motifs in linking elements of the plot whose connections might otherwise be inexplicit. This became known as the leitmotif technique (see below), although Wagner himself did not use this word.

However, Wagner relaxed some aspects of his self-imposed restrictions somewhat as the work progressed. As George Bernard Shaw sardonically noted of the last opera Götterdämmerung:

And now, O Nibelungen Spectator, pluck up; for all allegories come to an end somewhere... The rest of what you are going to see is opera and nothing but opera. Before many bars have been played, Siegfried and the wakened Brynhild, newly become tenor and soprano, will sing a concerted cadenza; plunge on from that to a magnificent love duet...The work which follows, entitled Night Falls on the Gods [Shaw's translation of Götterdämmerung], is a thorough grand opera.

== Music ==
=== Leitmotifs ===
As a significant element in the Ring and his subsequent works, Wagner adopted the use of leitmotifs, which are recurring themes or harmonic progressions. They musically denote an action, object, emotion, character, or other subject mentioned in the text or presented onstage. Wagner referred to them in "Opera and Drama" as "guides-to-feeling", describing how they could be used to inform the listener of a musical or dramatic subtext to the action onstage in the same way as a Greek chorus did for the theatre of ancient Greece.

=== Instrumentation ===
Wagner made significant innovations in orchestration in this work. He wrote for a very large orchestra, using the whole range of instruments used singly or in combination to express the great range of emotion and events of the drama. Wagner even commissioned the production of new instruments, including the Wagner tuba, invented to fill a gap he found between the tone qualities of the horn and the trombone, as well as variations of existing instruments, such as the bass trumpet and revived the contrabass trombone, now with a double slide. He also developed the "Wagner bell", enabling the bassoon to reach the low A-natural, whereas normally B-flat is the instrument's lowest note. If such a bell is not available, then a contrabassoon should be employed.

All four parts have a very similar instrumentation. The core ensemble is:

==== Woodwinds ====
- one piccolo, three flutes (third doubling second piccolo), three oboes, cor anglais (doubling fourth oboe), three soprano clarinets, one bass clarinet, three bassoons

==== Brass ====
- eight horns (fifth through eighth doubling Wagner tubas), three trumpets, one bass trumpet, three tenor trombones, one contrabass trombone (doubling bass trombone), one contrabass tuba

==== Percussion ====
- 4 timpani (requiring two players), triangle, cymbals, tam-tam, glockenspiel

==== Strings ====
- six harps
- 16 first and 16 second violins, 12 violas, 12 cellos and 8 double basses

Das Rheingold requires one bass drum, one offstage harp, one offstage hammer and 18 offstage anvils. Die Walküre requires one tenor drum, one D clarinet (played by the third clarinetist), and an offstage steerhorn. Siegfried requires one offstage cor anglais and one offstage horn. Götterdämmerung requires a snare drum, as well as five offstage horns, 3 offstage steerhorns and one onstage steerhorn, to be blown by Hagen.

=== Tonality ===
Much of the Ring, especially from Act III of Siegfried-onwards, cannot be said to be in traditional, clearly defined keys for long stretches, but rather in 'key regions', each of which flows smoothly into the following. This fluidity avoided the musical equivalent of clearly defined musical paragraphs and assisted Wagner in building the work's huge structures. Tonal indeterminacy was heightened by the increased freedom with which he used dissonance and chromaticism. Chromatically altered chords are used very liberally in the Ring and this feature, which is also prominent in Tristan und Isolde, is often cited as a milestone on the way to Arnold Schoenberg's revolutionary break with the traditional concept of key and his dissolution of consonance as the basis of an organising principle in music.

== Composition ==
In summer 1848 Wagner wrote The Nibelung Myth as Sketch for a Drama, combining the medieval sources previously mentioned into a single narrative, very similar to the plot of the eventual Ring cycle, but nevertheless with substantial differences. Later that year he began writing a libretto entitled Siegfrieds Tod ("Siegfried's Death"). He was possibly stimulated by a series of articles in the Neue Zeitschrift für Musik, inviting composers to write a 'national opera' based on the Nibelungenlied, a 12th-century High German poem which, since its rediscovery in 1755, had been hailed by the German Romantics as the "German national epic". Siegfrieds Tod dealt with the death of Siegfried, the central heroic figure of the Nibelungenlied. The idea had occurred to others – the correspondence of Fanny and Felix Mendelssohn in 1840/41 reveals that they were both outlining scenarios on the subject: Fanny wrote 'The hunt with Siegfried's death provides a splendid finale to the second act'.

By 1850, Wagner had completed a musical sketch (which he abandoned) for Siegfrieds Tod. He now felt that he needed a preliminary opera, Der junge Siegfried ("The Young Siegfried", later renamed to "Siegfried"), to explain the events in Siegfrieds Tod and his verse draft of this was completed in May 1851. By October, he had made the momentous decision to embark on a cycle of four operas, to be played over four nights: Das Rheingold, Die Walküre, Der Junge Siegfried and Siegfrieds Tod; the text for all four parts was completed in December 1852 and privately published in February 1853.

In November 1853, Wagner began the composition draft of Das Rheingold. Unlike the verses, which were written as it were in reverse order, the music would be composed in the same order as the narrative. Composition proceeded until 1857, when the final score up to the end of act 2 of Siegfried was completed. Wagner then laid the work aside for twelve years, during which he wrote Tristan und Isolde and Die Meistersinger von Nürnberg.

By 1869, Wagner was living at Tribschen on Lake Lucerne, sponsored by King Ludwig II of Bavaria. He returned to Siegfried and, remarkably, was able to pick up where he left off. In October, he completed the final work in the cycle. He chose the title Götterdämmerung instead of Siegfrieds Tod. In the completed work the gods are destroyed in accordance with the new pessimistic thrust of the cycle, not redeemed as in the more optimistic originally planned ending. Wagner also decided to show onstage the events of Das Rheingold and Die Walküre, which had hitherto only been presented as back-narration in the other two parts. These changes resulted in some discrepancies in the cycle, but these do not diminish the value of the work.

== Performances ==
=== First productions ===
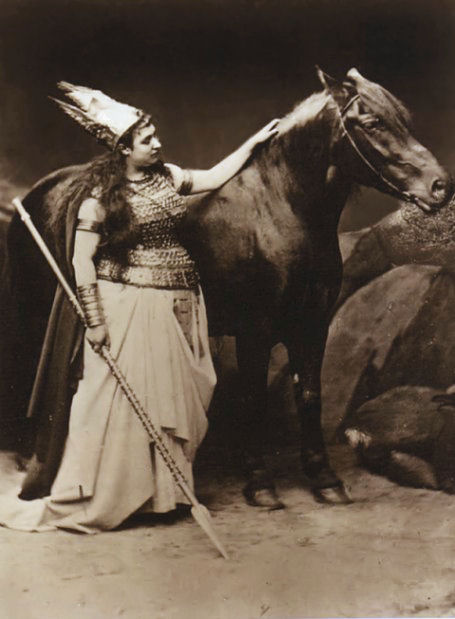
Amalie Materna, the first Bayreuth Brünnhilde, with Cocotte, the horse donated by King Ludwig to play her horse Grane

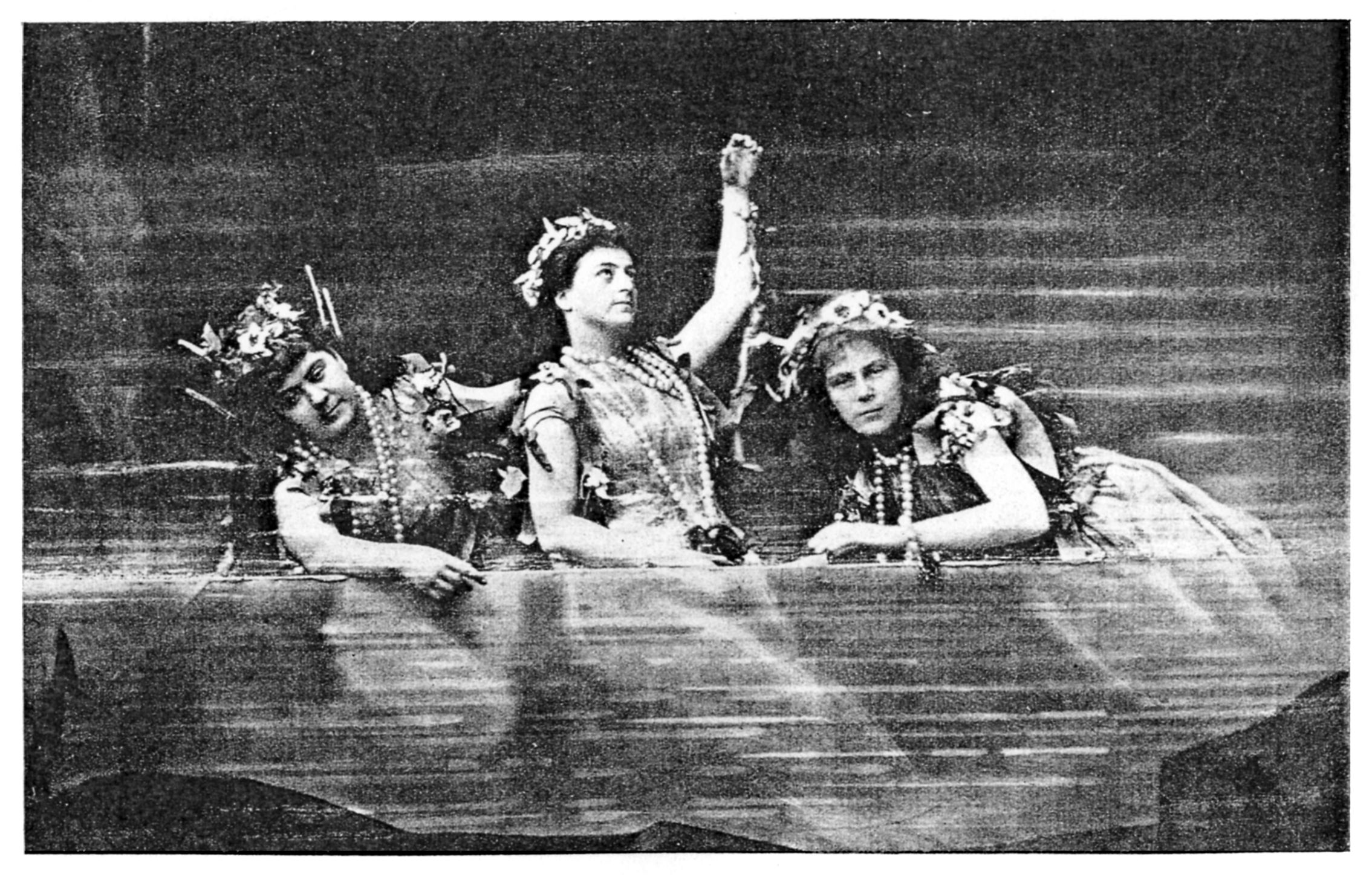
The Rhinemaidens in the first Bayreuth production in 1876

On King Ludwig's insistence, and over Wagner's objections, "special previews" of Das Rheingold and Die Walküre were given at the National Theatre in Munich, before the rest of the Ring. Thus, Das Rheingold premiered on 22 September 1869 and Die Walküre on 26 June 1870. Wagner subsequently delayed announcing his completion of Siegfried to prevent this work also being premiered against his wishes.

Wagner had long desired to have a special festival opera house, designed by himself, for the performance of the Ring. In 1871, he decided on a location in the Bavarian town of Bayreuth. In 1872, he moved to Bayreuth and the foundation stone was laid. Wagner would spend the next two years attempting to raise capital for the construction, with scant success; King Ludwig finally rescued the project in 1874 by donating the needed funds. The Bayreuth Festspielhaus opened in 1876 with the first complete performance of the Ring, which took place from 13 to 17 August.

In 1882, London impresario Alfred Schulz-Curtius organized the first staging in the United Kingdom of the Ring cycle, conducted by Anton Seidl and directed by Angelo Neumann.

The first production of the Ring in Italy was in Venice (the place where Wagner died), just two months after his 1883 death, at La Fenice.

The first Australian Ring (and The Mastersingers of Nuremberg) was presented in an English-language production by the British travelling Quinlan Opera Company, in conjunction with J. C. Williamson's, in Melbourne and Sydney in 1913.

=== Modern productions ===
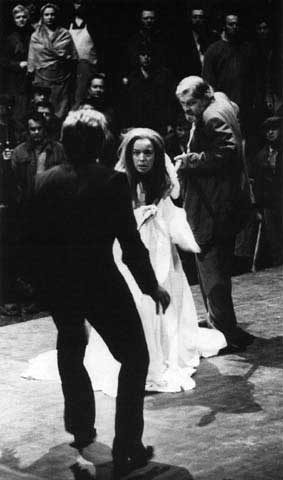
Gwyneth Jones performing at the 1976 Bayreuth production of Der Ring des Nibelungen, conducted by Pierre Boulez and directed by Patrice Chéreau

The Ring is a major undertaking for any opera company: staging four interlinked operas requires a huge commitment both artistically and financially; hence, in most opera houses, production of a new Ring cycle will happen over a number of years, with one or two operas in the cycle being added each year. The Bayreuth Festival, where the complete cycle is performed most years, is unusual in that a new cycle is almost always created within a single year.

Early productions of the Ring cycle stayed close to Wagner's original Bayreuth staging. Trends set at Bayreuth have continued to be influential. Following the closure of the Festspielhaus during the Second World War, the 1950s saw productions by Wagner's grandsons Wieland and Wolfgang Wagner (known as the "New Bayreuth" style), which emphasised the human aspects of the drama in a more abstract setting.

Perhaps the most famous modern production was the centennial production of 1976, the Jahrhundertring, directed by Patrice Chéreau and conducted by Pierre Boulez. Set in the Industrial Revolution, it replaced the depths of the Rhine with a hydroelectric power dam and featured grimy sets populated by men and gods in 19th and 20th century business suits. This drew heavily on the reading of the Ring as a revolutionary drama and critique of the modern world, famously expounded by George Bernard Shaw in The Perfect Wagnerite. Early performances were booed but the audience of 1980 gave it a 45-minute ovation in its final year.

Seattle Opera has created three different productions of the tetralogy: Ring 1, 1975 to 1984: Originally directed by George London, with designs by John Naccarato following the famous illustrations by Arthur Rackham. It was performed twice each summer, once in German, once in Andrew Porter's English adaptation. Henry Holt conducted all performances. Ring 2, 1985–1995: Directed by Francois Rochaix, with sets and costumes designed by Robert Israel, lighting by Joan Sullivan and supertitles (the first ever created for the Ring) by Sonya Friedman. The production set the action in a world of nineteenth-century theatricality; it was initially controversial in 1985, it sold out its final performances in 1995. Conductors included Armin Jordan (Die Walküre in 1985), Manuel Rosenthal (1986) and Hermann Michael (1987, 1991 and 1995). Ring 3, 2000–2013: the production, which became known as the "Green" Ring, was in part inspired by the natural beauty of the Pacific Northwest. Directed by Stephen Wadsworth, set designer Thomas Lynch, costume designer Martin Pakledinaz, lighting designer Peter Kaczorowski; Armin Jordan conducted in 2000, Franz Vote in 2001 and Robert Spano in 2005 and 2009. The 2013 performances, conducted by Asher Fisch, were released as a commercial recording on compact disc and on iTunes.

In 2003 the first production of the cycle in Russia in modern times was conducted by Valery Gergiev at the Mariinsky Opera, Saint Petersburg, designed by George Tsypin. The production drew parallels with Ossetian mythology.

The Royal Danish Opera performed a complete Ring cycle in May 2006 in its new waterfront home, the Copenhagen Opera House. This version of the Ring tells the story from the viewpoint of Brünnhilde and has a distinct feminist angle. For example, in a key scene in Die Walküre, it is Sieglinde and not Siegmund who manages to pull the sword Nothung out of a tree. At the end of the cycle, Brünnhilde does not die, but instead gives birth to Siegfried's child.

In September 2006, the Canadian Opera Company opened its new opera house, The Four Seasons Centre with a production of the Ring. Three cycles were presented with a different director overseeing an opera.

San Francisco Opera and Washington National Opera began a co-production of a new cycle in 2006 directed by Francesca Zambello. The production uses imagery from various eras of American history and has a feminist and environmentalist viewpoint. Recent performances of this production took place at the John F. Kennedy Center for the Performing Arts in Washington D.C. in April/May 2016, featuring Catherine Foster and Nina Stemme as Brünnhilde, Daniel Brenna as Siegfried and Alan Held as Wotan.

Los Angeles Opera presented its first Ring cycle in 2010 directed by Achim Freyer. Freyer staged an abstract production that was praised by many critics but criticized by some of its own stars. The production featured a raked stage, flying props, screen projections and special effects.

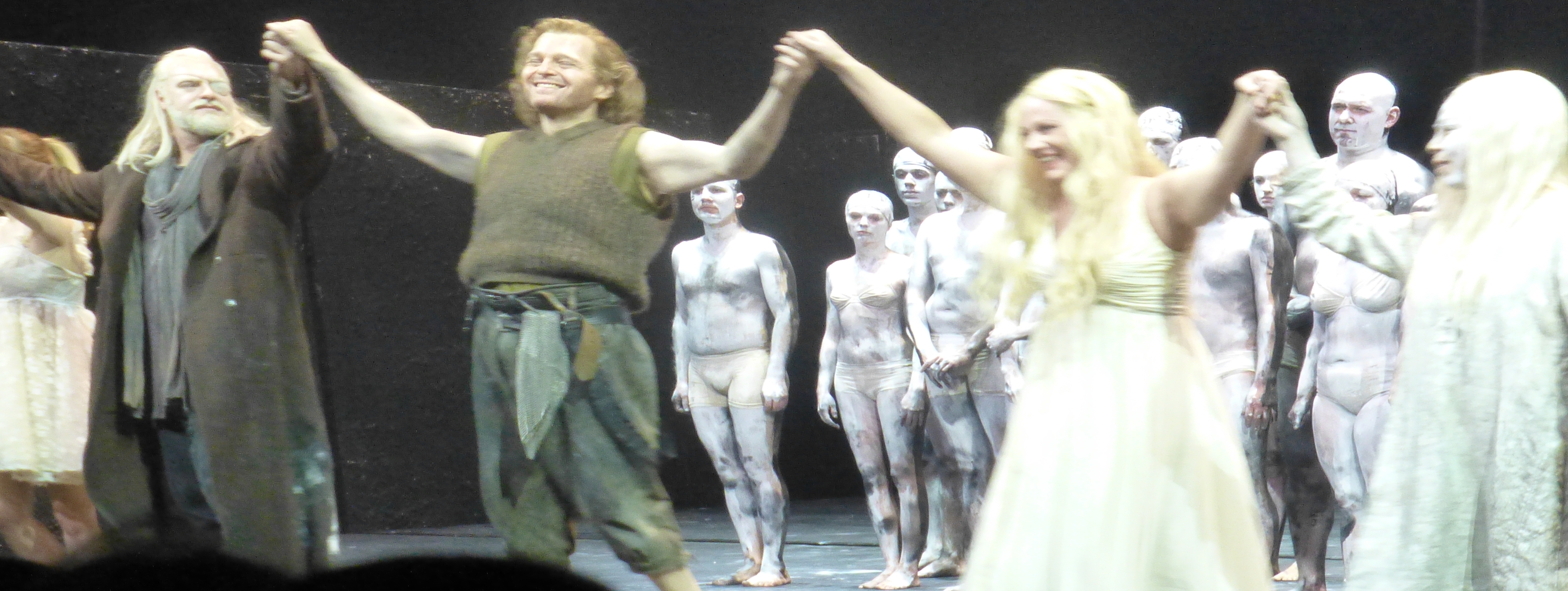
Modern costuming shown in closing bows following Siegfried in 2013 at the Bavarian State Opera in Munich

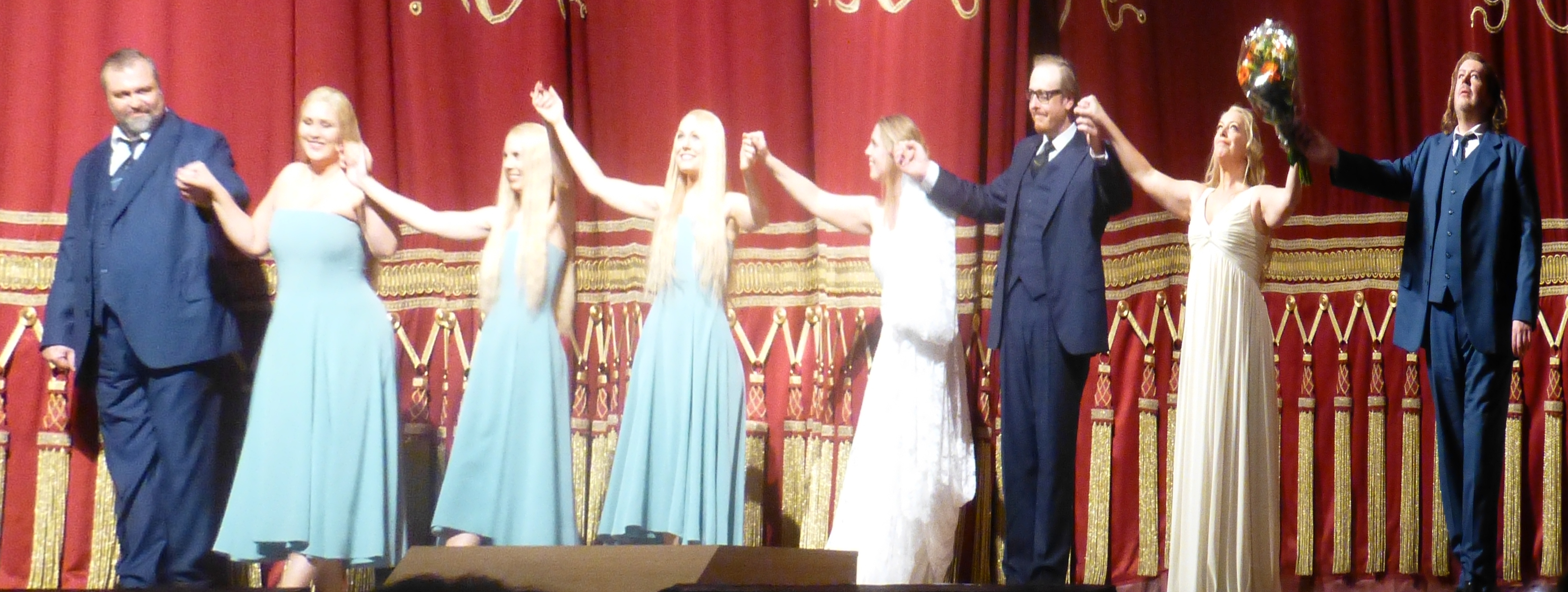
Modern costuming shown in closing bows following Götterdämmerung in 2013 at the Bavarian State Opera. Left to right: Gunther, the Rhinemaidens, Gutrune, Hagen, Brünnhilde, Siegfried

The Metropolitan Opera began a new Ring cycle directed by French-Canadian theater director Robert Lepage in 2010. Premiering with Das Rheingold on opening night of the 2010/2011 Season conducted by James Levine with Bryn Terfel as Wotan. This was followed by Die Walküre in April 2011 starring Deborah Voigt. The 2011/12 season introduced Siegfried and Götterdämmerung with Voigt, Terfel and Jay Hunter Morris before the entire cycle was given in the Spring of 2012 conducted by Fabio Luisi (who stepped in for Levine due to health issues). Lepage's staging was dominated by a 90,000 pound (40 tonne) structure which consisted of 24 identical aluminium planks able to rotate independently on a horizontal axis across the stage, providing level, sloping, angled or moving surfaces facing the audience. Bubbles, falling stones and fire were projected on to these surfaces, linked by computer with the music and movement of the characters. The subsequent HD recordings in 2013 won the Met's orchestra and chorus the Grammy Award for Best Opera Recording for their performance. In 2019, the Metropolitan Opera revived the Lepage staging for the first time since 2013 with Philippe Jordan conducting, Greer Grimsley and Michael Volle rotating as Wotan, Stefan Vinke and Andreas Schager rotating as Siegfried and Met homegrown Christine Goerke as Brünnhilde. Lepage's "Machine", as it affectionately became known, underwent major reconfiguration for the revival in order to dampen the creaking that it had produced in the past (to the annoyance of audience members and critics) and to improve its reliability, as it had been known to break down during earlier runs including on the opening night of Rheingold. Unlike its beloved predecessor directed by Viennese opera director Otto Schenk which played at the house over 22 years, the Met has confirmed that this controversial and expensive production will not return again, having lasted just shy of ten years at the house with only three complete cycles having been given. They announced it would be replaced by a new production in 2025, however though originally in partnership with the English National Opera this was cancelled due to ENO budgetary cuts and poor audience response. In 2024 they announced director Yuval Sharon would instead direct a new production with the first installment set to premiere in the 27/28 season finishing with the full cycle in the Spring of 2030.

The Lyric Opera of Chicago has staged three complete Ring Cycles in the past four decades, with a cycle in the 1990s, the 2000s, and in the late 2010s.

The mid-1990s production by August Everding with choreography by Cirque du Soleil's Debra Brown was conducted by Zubin Mehta, with James Morris a Wotan and Eva Marton as Brünnhilde, Siegfried Jerusalem as Siegmund, and Tina Kiberg as Sieglinde.

The 2000s Ring cast included "James Morris as Wotan, Jane Eaglen as Brünnhilde, Plácido Domingo as Siegmund, and Michelle DeYoung as Sieglinde." Lyric music director Andrew Davis conduct[ed]. The company ... revived the August Everding production that it presented nine years [earlier], restaged by Herbert Kellner with minor changes ... The bungee-jumping Rhinemaidens and the Valkyries on trampolines from the original production, choreographed by Cirque du Soleil's Debra Brown ... returned. Sets and costumes [were] by John Conklin; lighting [was] by Duane Schuler."

The most recent production's Das Rheingold premiered in 2016, with subsequent Ring operas Die Walküre, Siegfried, and Götterdämmerung staged between 2017 and 2019. The subsequent "full Ring" performances in the spring of 2020 were cancelled due to the COVID-19 global pandemic and has never been staged at the Lyric as the complete cycle.

Opera Australia presented the Ring cycle at the State Theatre in Melbourne, Australia, in November 2013, directed by Neil Armfield and conducted by Pietari Inkinen. Classical Voice America heralded the production as "one of the best Rings anywhere in a long time." The production was presented again in Melbourne from 21 November to 16 December 2016 starring Lise Lindstrom, Stefan Vinke, Amber Wagner and Jacqueline Dark.

It is possible to perform The Ring with fewer resources than usual. In 1990, the City of Birmingham Touring Opera (now Birmingham Opera Company), presented a two-evening adaptation (by Jonathan Dove) for a limited number of solo singers, each doubling several roles and 18 orchestral players. This version was subsequently given productions in the USA. A heavily cut-down version (7 hours plus intervals) was performed at the Teatro Colón in Buenos Aires on 26 November 2012 to mark the 200th anniversary of Wagner's birth.

In a different approach, Der Ring in Minden staged the cycle on the small stage of the Stadttheater Minden, beginning in 2015 with Das Rheingold, followed by the other parts in the succeeding years and culminating with the complete cycle performed twice in 2019. The stage director was Gerd Heinz, and Frank Beermann conducted the Nordwestdeutsche Philharmonie, playing at the back of the stage. The singers acted in front of the orchestra, making an intimate approach to the dramatic situations possible. The project received international recognition.

== Other treatments of the Ring cycle ==
Orchestral versions of the Ring cycle, summarizing the work in a single movement of an hour or so, have been made by Leopold Stokowski, Lorin Maazel (Der Ring ohne Worte, 1988) and Henk de Vlieger (The Ring: An Orchestral Adventure, 1991).

English-Canadian comedian and singer Anna Russell recorded a twenty-two-minute version of the Ring for her album Anna Russell Sings! Again? in 1953, characterized by camp humour and sharp wit.

Produced by the Ridiculous Theatrical Company, Charles Ludlam's 1977 play Der Ring Gott Farblonjet was a spoof of Wagner's operas. The show received a well-reviewed 1990 revival in New York at the Lucille Lortel Theatre.

In 1991, Seattle Opera premiered a musical comedy parody of the Ring cycle called Das Barbecü, with book and lyrics by Jim Luigs and music by Scott Warrender. It follows the outline of the cycle's plot but shifts the setting to Texas ranch country. It was later produced off-Broadway and elsewhere around the world.

The German two-part television movie Dark Kingdom: The Dragon King (2004, also known as Ring of the Nibelungs, Die Nibelungen, Curse of the Ring and Sword of Xanten) is based in some of the same material Richard Wagner used for his music dramas Siegfried and Götterdämmerung.

An adaptation of Wagner's storyline was published as a graphic novel in 2002 by P. Craig Russell.

The Ring cycle was the basis for a video game duology simply titled Ring, where each game adapts two of the four parts. The game reimagines the Ring cycle in a science fiction setting, and was very poorly received critically, although the first game was a financial success.
