= Wieland der Schmied (libretto) =

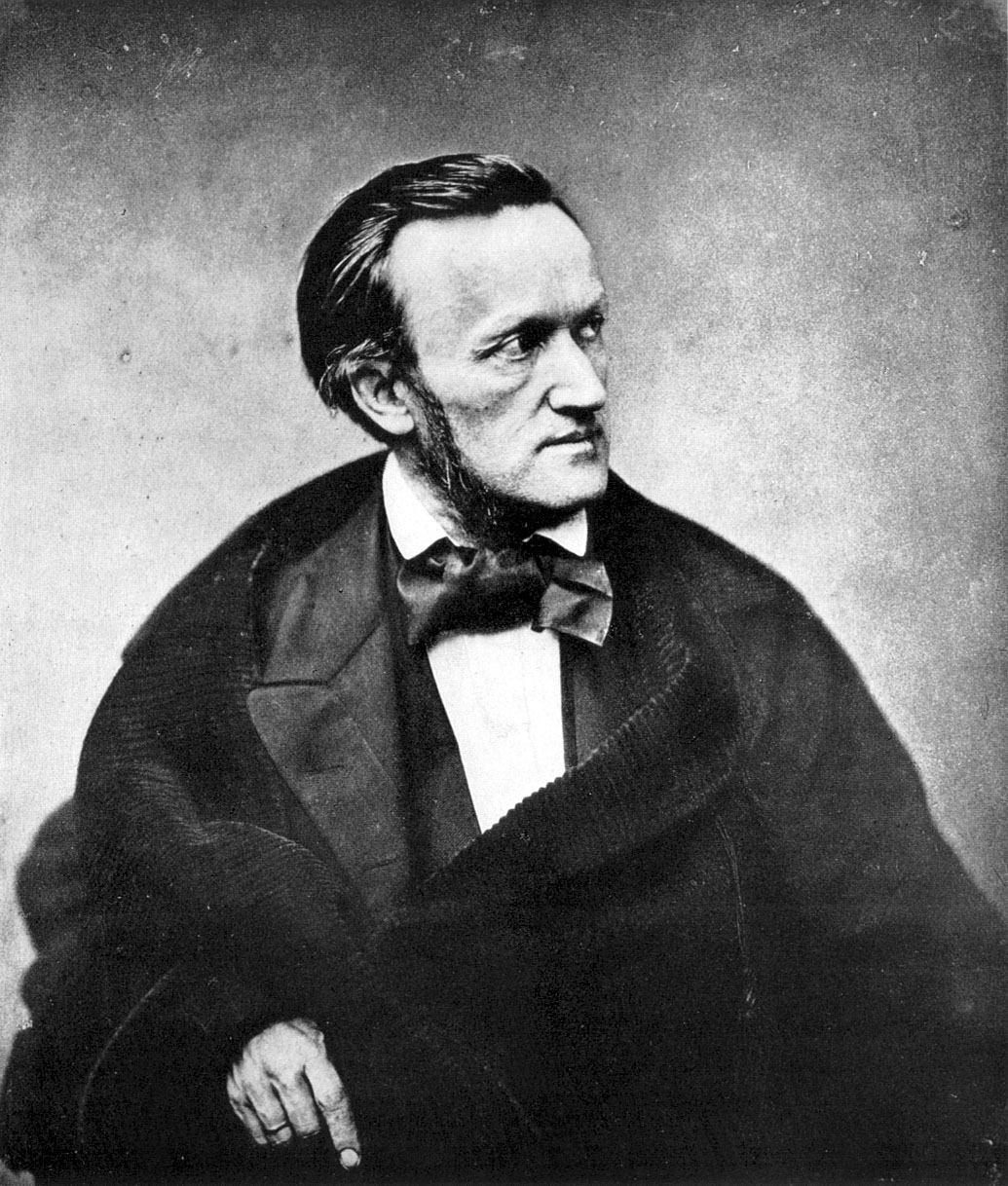
Richard Wagner in Paris, 1861

Wieland der Schmied ([ˈviːlant deːɐ̯ ˈʃmiːt], "Wieland the Smith") is a draft by Richard Wagner for an opera libretto based on the Germanic legend of Wayland Smith. It is listed in the Wagner-Werk-Verzeichnis as WWV82.

== Background ==
Wagner was motivated by his enthusiasm for the Romeo and Juliet symphony of Hector Berlioz to create a libretto which might serve for a production at the Paris Opéra, with music perhaps to be written by Berlioz or by himself. The draft, which is mostly in prose, was written between December 1849 and March 1850. It was published as an appendix to Wagner's essay The Art-Work of the Future as an example of the ideals to which such art-works should aspire - "a glorious Saga which long ago the raw, uncultured Folk of old-time Germany indited for no other reason than that of inner, free, Necessity".

The libretto contains many elements which are found in other of Wagner's operas (a swan, a wound, a spear, a ring, smithying, an absent mysterious father, a forbidden question), and one biographer calls it 'one of Wagner's most frankly autobiographic libretti'. Nevertheless, Wagner decided to abandon it, presumably because he realised its subject matter was not to French taste. He offered the libretto to Franz Liszt who also declined it.

The libretto was eventually adapted by O. Schlemm for the composer Ján Levoslav Bella who composed an opera on it between 1880 and 1890. (See Wieland der Schmied.) This was eventually produced in Bratislava, Czechoslovakia in 1926. Revivals were produced in Slovak, under the title Kováč Wieland.

The composer Siegmund von Hausegger wrote the symphonic elaboration of the unperformed opera libretto in 1904, which he refers to as the "allegory of the attainment of creative powers".

== Story ==
Swanhilde is the daughter of a marriage between a mortal woman and a fairy king, who forbids his wife to ask about his origins; on her asking him he vanishes. Swanhilde and her sisters are however able to fly as swans. But wounded by a spear, Swanhilde falls to earth and is rescued by the master-craftsman Wieland, and marries him, putting aside her wings and her magic ring of power. Wieland's enemies, the Neidings, under Princess Bathilde, steal the ring, kidnap Swanhilde and destroy Wieland's home. When Wieland searches for Swanhilde, they entrap and cripple him. However he fashions wings for himself and escapes with Swanhilde as the house of the Neidings is destroyed.

== Bibliography ==
- Oskár Elschek (ed.), A History of Slovak Music, Bratislava 2003. ISBN 80-224-0724-0
- Robert W. Guttman, Richard Wagner:The Man, his Mind and his Music, London, 1990 ISBN 0-15-677615-4
- Barry Millington (ed.), The Wagner Compendium, London 1992 ISBN 0-500-28274-9
- Richard Wagner, tr. W. Ashton Ellis The Art-Work of the Future and other Works, Lincoln and London 1993. ISBN 0-8032-9752-1
- John Warrack, The Musical Background, in Peter Burbidge and Richard Sutton (eds.), The Wagner Companion, London 1979. ISBN 0-571-11450-4
