= Ján Levoslav Bella =

Slovak composer, conductor and music teacher

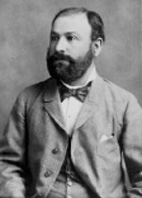
Ján Levoslav Bella, c. 1880

Ján Levoslav Bella (German Johann Leopold Bella; 4 September 1843 – 25 May 1936) was a Slovak composer, conductor and music teacher, who wrote in the spirit of the Nationalist Romantic movement of the 19th century.

== Life ==
Bella was born in Liptovský Mikuláš (Liptau-Sankt-Nikolaus), Austrian Empire (now Slovakia), and raised in a Roman Catholic family. He studied at the college in Levoča and a seminary in Banská Bystrica before taking a degree at Vienna University.

Bella was ordained a priest in 1866. From 1869 to 1881 he was town director of music at Kremnica. He left the priesthood in 1881 and converted to Protestantism, becoming director of music in Hermannstadt/Nagyszeben, now Sibiu in modern Romania, (at that time Kingdom of Hungary) where he remained until 1921. From 1921 to 1928 he lived in retirement in Vienna, moving to Bratislava in 1928, where he died in 1936.

== Music ==
Bella began to compose whilst studying in Levoča. At this time his output was largely small-scale, such as church music, folk-song arrangements and some chamber music. In 1873 however, visiting Vienna and Prague, he heard for the first time the music of, amongst others, Robert Schumann, Richard Wagner and Bedřich Smetana. This encounter with romantic music had a profound effect, of which the first result was Bella's 1874 symphonic poem Osud a ideál (Fate and the Ideal), which premiered in Prague in 1876.

In his day Bella was respected both as a composer and conductor by such important musical figures as Antonín Dvořák, Johannes Brahms, Hans von Bülow, Joseph Joachim and Ernst von Dohnányi.

Bella wrote in many different forms, including songs, church music, organ music, chamber music and orchestral music. His operas include Wieland der Schmied (Wieland the Blacksmith), to a libretto originally written by Richard Wagner and based on German legend. This was written in the period 1880–1890 and first performed in 1926 in Bratislava, where it was performed in a Slovak version as Kováč Wieland.

In recent times, Bella's music and reputation have been revived by, amongst others, the Slovak composer and scholar Vladimír Godár. Recordings of his complete chamber and organ works have been issued by Hudobné Centrum in Bratislava.

Banská Bystrica's Ján Levoslav Bella Conservatory, founded in 1992, is named after him.
