= Musikdrama =

German word meaning a unity of prose and music

Musikdrama is a German word that means a unity of prose and music. Initially coined by Theodor Mundt in 1833, it was most notably used by Richard Wagner, along with Gesamtkunstwerk, to define his operas.

== Usage ==
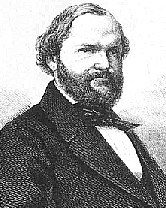
Theodor Mundt (1808–1861), who coined Musikdrama was a German critic and novelist. He was a member of the Young Germany group of German writers.

Mundt formulated his definition explicitly in contrast to intermezzo, or a piece that sits in between dramatic entities. To this day, Musikdrama is associated with the works of Richard Wagner where poetry, music and stage performances were not arbitrarily combined. Wagner himself composed the music and libretto for his operas and was a consultant on the stage design and choreography. This all-encompassing art, or Gesamtkunstwerk, called on the diegesis of Musikdrama in order to further the immersive feel.

Wagner himself resisted calling his works Musikdrama, which would imply a drama "meant for music," like a libretto. Instead he wanted to put music at the service of the drama, which indeed in its original ancient Greek form was inseparable from music. Nevertheless, the term music drama has become accepted. A major characteristic of Musikdrama is its formal unity, without interruptions or smaller closed forms such as arias or duets. Recurring leitmotifs provide support and interpretation of the text, which progresses as in a spoken drama.
