= May Uprising in Dresden =

1849 failed revolution in Dresden, Kingdom of Saxony

- Part of the Revolutions of 1848
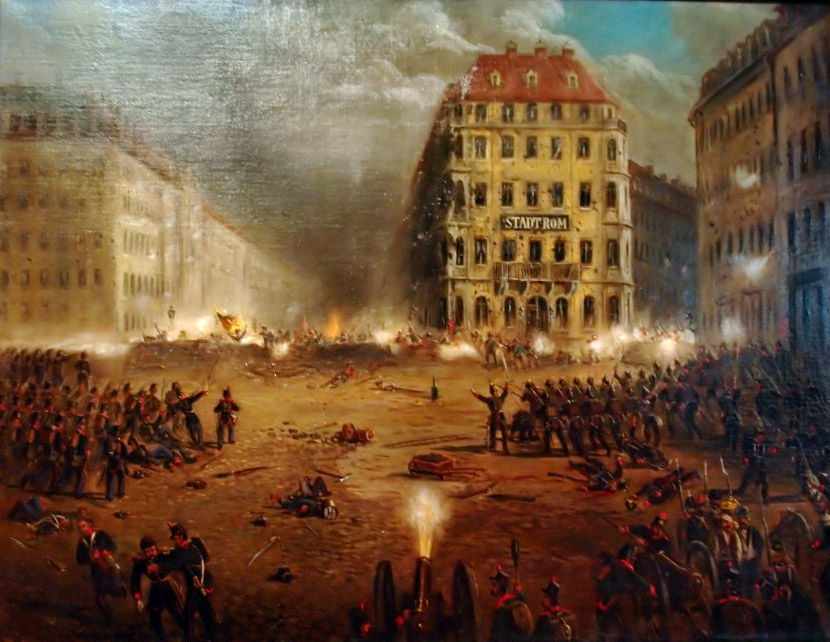
- Prussian and Saxon troops assault revolutionary barricades in the Dresden Neumarkt
Date	3–9 May 1849
Location	Dresden, Saxony
Result	Government victory

Belligerents
Dresden revolutionaries	Kingdom of Saxony; Prussia

Commanders and leaders
Samuel Tzschirner; Karl Gotthelf Todt; Otto Heubner; Alexander Heinze	

Strength
3,000	5,000

Casualties and losses
197 killed 114 wounded ~1,200 captured	31 killed 94 wounded

The May Uprising took place in Dresden, Kingdom of Saxony in 1849; it was one of the last of the series of events known as the Revolutions of 1848.

== Events leading to the May Uprising ==
In the German states, revolutions began in March 1848, starting in Berlin and spreading across the other states which now make up Germany. The heart of the revolutions was in Frankfurt, where the newly formed National Assembly, the Frankfurt Parliament, met in St Paul's Church from May 1848, calling for a constitutional monarchy to rule a new, united German nation. To form the Assembly, near-democratic elections had taken place across the German states; the majority of the members were Saxon democrats. On 28 March 1849 the Assembly passed the first Reichsverfassung (constitution) for Germany, and in April 1849, Friedrich Wilhelm IV of Prussia was offered the crown.

Despite its apparent progress, the National Assembly really depended upon the co-operation of the old leaders and Emperor; this became all too clear when Friedrich Wilhelm IV refused to accept the crown in disgust. Movements sprang up across the German states to force through the new constitution but the National Assembly disintegrated. In Saxony, Frederick Augustus II had never recognised the constitution, and now also disbanded the Saxon parliament.

In Württemberg the more radical elements of the National Assembly formed a rump parliament in Stuttgart, which was defeated by Prussian troops. At the same time, the people of Saxony began to react to the repression of the democratic movement — the May Uprising began.

== The uprising ==
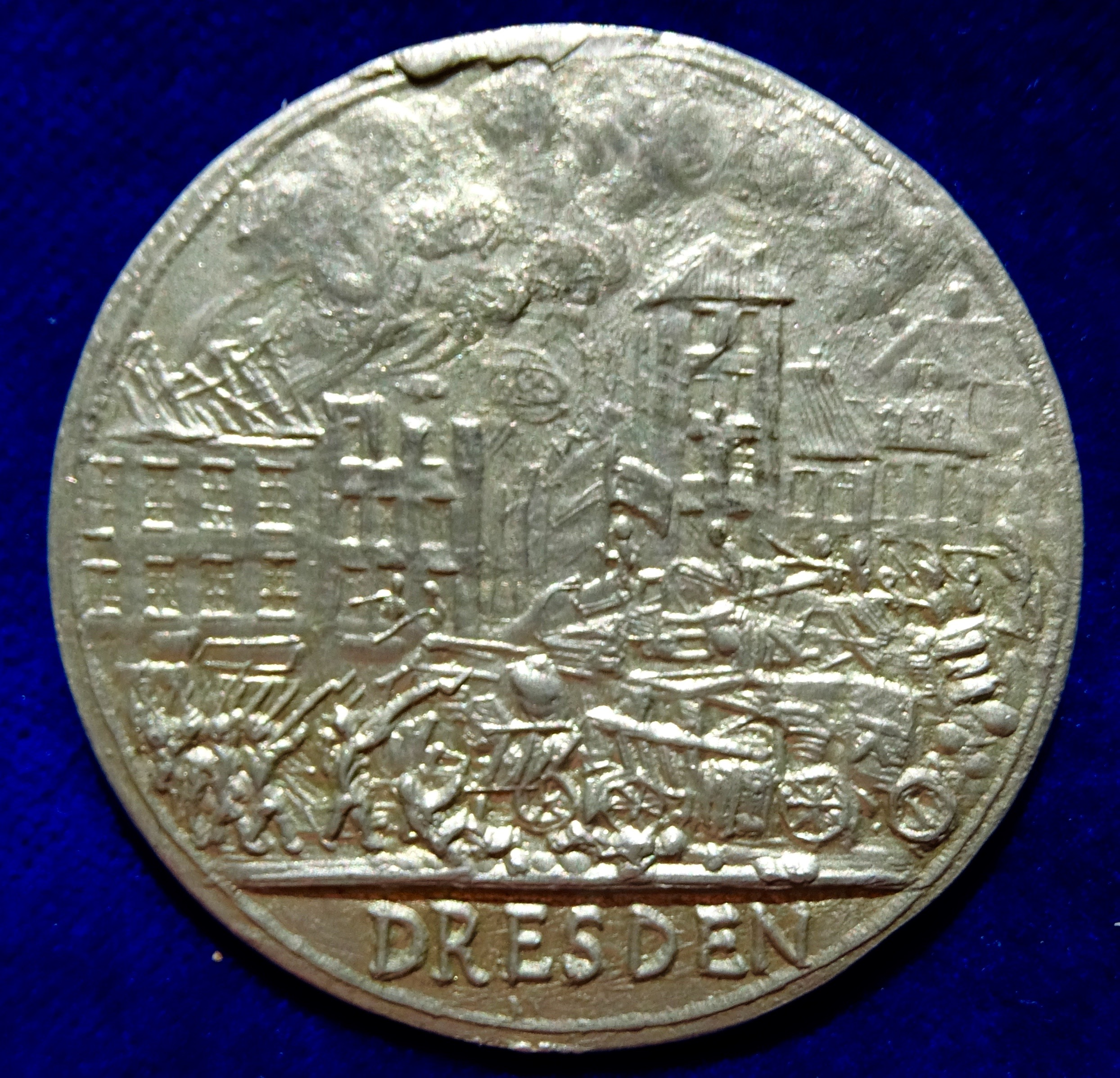
Revolutionary war medal of the May Uprising in Dresden, Kingdom of Saxony, 1849, obverse, showing the street fighting.

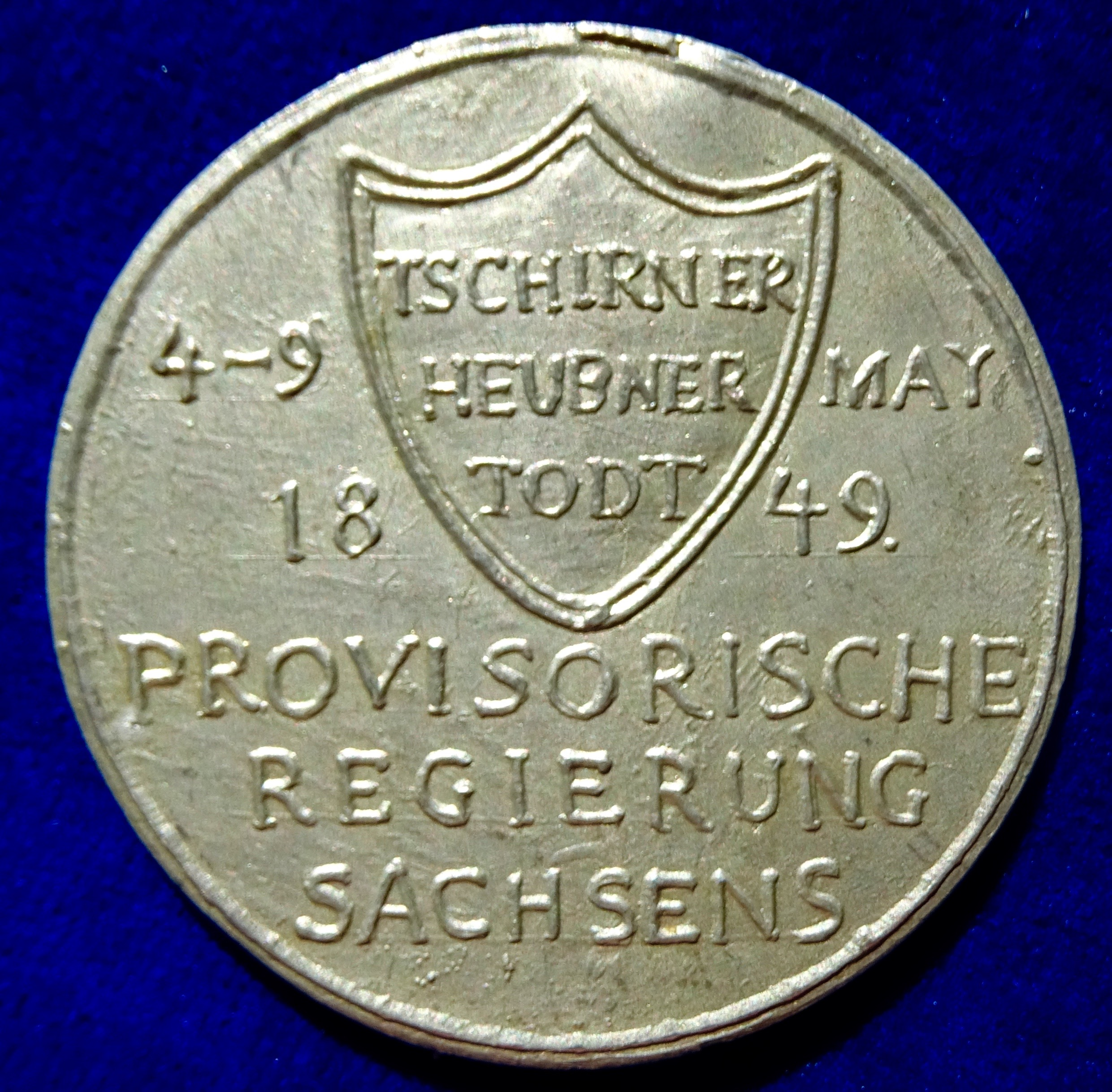
The reverse of this medal shows the names of the leaders of the provisional government Tzschirner, Heubner and Todt, and the dates of the uprising.

At first the Saxon town councillors attempted to persuade Frederick Augustus II to accept the constitution in public speeches. The municipal guards who should have controlled them were on their side and made an address to the King, also calling for acceptance of the constitution. The King was unyielding, however, and called them to order. This led to further unrest, which in turn caused the king to bring in Prussian troops; the situation exploded.

On 3 May 1849, the municipal guards were told to go home, but the town councillors organised them into defensive units to stop expected Prussian intervention. As the people's anger grew, the government withdrew into the castle and the armoury (Zeughaus), protected by Saxon troops. The municipal guards were undecided whether or not to support the people, who threatened to use explosives to get the government out. In response the Saxon troops fired on the crowd. Within hours the town was in chaos, with 108 barricades erected. In the early hours of 4 May 1849, the king and his ministers managed to escape and fled to the fortress of Königstein.

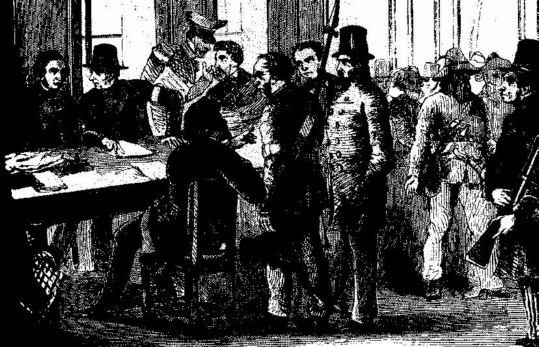
The provisional government in Dresden

Three members of the dissolved Democratic parliament now became the leaders of the revolution: Samuel Erdmann Tzschirner, Karl Gotthelf Todt and Otto Leonhard Heubner formed a provisional government with the aim of forcing the acceptance of the constitution. Tzschirner called in another member, Alexander Heinze, to organise fighting and bring in more communal guards from outside Dresden.

Reinforcements joined the revolutionaries from as far away as Chemnitz, Zwickau and Marienberg, and the struggle grew extremely violent. The Saxon troops were also backed up by arriving Prussian soldiers. They planned to encircle the rebels and corner them on the Altmarkt (Old Market), but the number of barricades meant they had to fight for every street, even in the houses.

Recent studies place the number of revolutionaries at around 3,000, compared with 5,000 government troops from Saxony and Prussia. Apart from being outnumbered, the rebels were also untrained in battle, disorganised and lacked weapons, so they stood little chance of success. On 9 May the majority (1,800) were forced to flee. Most of the others gave up, and the rest were tracked down to the Frauenkirche and arrested.

== Prominent figures amongst the revolutionaries ==
Before the events of May 1849, Dresden was already known as a cultural centre for liberals and democrats; the anarchist Dresdner Zeitung newspaper was partly edited by the music director August Röckel and contained articles by Mikhail Bakunin, who came to Dresden in March 1849. The Saxon government later accused Bakunin of being the revolutionaries' ringleader, although this is unlikely to have been the case. Röckel also published the popular democratic newspaper Volksblätter.

Richard Wagner the composer, at the time Royal Saxon Court Conductor, had been inspired by the revolutionary spirit since 1848 and was befriended by Röckel and Bakunin. He wrote passionate articles in the Volksblätter inciting people to revolt, and when fighting broke out he took a very active part in it, making hand grenades and standing as a look out at the top of the Kreuzkirche. The architect Gottfried Semper was until 1849 less politically active, but had made known his democratic beliefs and felt compelled to stand up for them, also taking a lead role on the barricades. Others on the barricades included Pauline Wunderlich, Gustav Zeuner, Ludwig Wittig (main editor of the Dresdner Zeitung); the actress and singer Wilhelmine Schröder-Devrient supported the uprising.

== Results of the uprising ==
The struggle left some Dresden buildings in ruins: the old Opera, two sides of the Zwinger and six houses were burned down. The number of dead rebels is uncertain but in 1995 the figure was estimated at around 200; 8 Saxon and 23 Prussian soldiers died.

The Saxon government arrested Bakunin and Röckel in Chemnitz, but Tzschirner, Heubner and Todt escaped. Todt died early in his Swiss exile at Rießbach in 1852. Semper and Wagner were on the government's wanted list, but also escaped, to Zürich, where Wagner remained. From 1849 the German states saw a sharp rise in emigration as thousands deserted their homeland for political reasons, many of them artists, writers and other well-educated, prominent members of society.

The revolution had a slight effect on the political system, in that the nobility lost some of its power in the lower house, but otherwise was a complete failure.

== See also ==
- Revolutions of 1848 in the German states
