= Wagner (film) =

1983 British television miniseries

- Genre: Biography; Music; Drama
- Written by: Charles Wood
- Directed by: Tony Palmer
- Starring: Richard Burton
- Composer: Richard Wagner
- Country of origin: United Kingdom
- Original language: English
- No. of seasons: 1
- No. of episodes: 10

Production
- Production locations: Dublin, Ireland
- Cinematography: Vittorio Storaro
- Running time: 466 minutes
- Production company: Hungarofilm

Original release
- Release: 3 October – 11 December 1983

Wagner is a 1983 television miniseries on the life of Richard Wagner with Richard Burton in the title role. It was directed by Tony Palmer and written by Charles Wood. The film was later released on DVD as a ten-part miniseries.

Other main roles were played by Vanessa Redgrave, Gemma Craven, Marthe Keller, Ronald Pickup, Miguel Herz-Kestranek and László Gálffi. Sir John Gielgud, Sir Ralph Richardson and Sir Laurence Olivier played ministers of Ludwig II of Bavaria.

The cast also includes the composer William Walton, and his wife Susan Walton, in the roles of the royal couple Frederick Augustus II of Saxony and Maria Anna of Bavaria.

The music of Wagner was specially recorded for the film, and conducted by Sir Georg Solti.

== Production ==
Tony Palmer's original concept of Wagner was as a feature film. It lasted 7 hours 46 minutes, but it was later edited down to a 5-hour version in which some characters disappeared. Later the film was screened as a 10 episode mini-series on television clocking in at almost 9 hours. In 2011 it was re-released in a three-DVD set in its full original version as a feature film, in high definition and widescreen. It had earlier been released on videotape.

It was filmed in many authentic locations including King Ludwig II's castle of Neuschwanstein and Herrenchiemsee, and the Residenz in Munich. Other locations were in Hungary, Switzerland, Siena, Tuscany, Venice, Vienna and Dublin.

Palmer said of Burton's performance, "Even now – although there were criticisms – I can't think of anybody who could have brought it off better than he did."

== Critical reception ==
The film received glowing reviews from leading European and music journals.

"Wagner can be mentioned alongside such exceptional film biographies as Gandhi, Reds and Abel Gance's Napoléon ... Wagner is one of the most beautifully photographed motion pictures in history."

"An absolute bulls-eye... wonderful... technically brilliant.. musically and filmically on the highest level... it will surely set out on a triumphant procession around the world."

"A monumental film... a complete work of art... truly visionary..."

"A remarkable event... hardly a minute too long... a British Film of glory... takes the screen by storm... a big spirited work"

In America, when a much truncated version just over 4 hours was shown on PBS, The New York Times in an atypical review described the show as "pretentious kitsch" and a "colossal disaster".

== Cast ==
- Richard Burton as Richard Wagner
- Gemma Craven as Minna Planer, later Wagner
- Dame Vanessa Redgrave as Cosima von Bülow, later Wagner
- Miguel Herz-Kestranek as Hans von Bülow
- László Gálffi as King Ludwig II of Bavaria
- Zoltán Gera as Lüttichau
- Sir John Gielgud as Franz Seraph von Pfistermeister
- Sir Laurence Olivier as Sigmund von Pfeufer
- Sir Ralph Richardson as Baron Karl Ludwig von der Pfordten
- Ekkehard Schall as Franz Liszt
- Ronald Pickup as Friedrich Nietzsche
- Liza Goddard as Jessie Laussot
- Marthe Keller as Mathilde Wesendonck
- Richard Pasco as Otto Wesendonck
- Peter Hofmann as Ludwig Schnorr von Carolsfeld
- Dame Gwyneth Jones as Malvina Schnorr von Carolsfeld
- Jess Thomas as Albert Niemann
- Vernon Dobtcheff as Giacomo Meyerbeer
- Gabriel Byrne as Karl Ritter
- Sir William Walton as King Frederick Augustus II of Saxony
- Lady Susan Walton as Maria Anna of Bavaria, wife of Frederick
- Sigfrit Steiner as King Ludwig I of Bavaria
- Barbara Leigh-Hunt as Queen Marie of Bavaria Marie of Prussia
- Daphne Wagner as Princess Pauline von Metternich
- Dame Joan Plowright as Mrs Taylor
- Corin Redgrave as Dr Pusinelli
- Prunella Scales as Frau Pollert
- Péter Andorai as Mikhail Bakunin
- Arthur Lowe as Meser
- Andrew Cruickshank as the Narrator

== Episodes ==
Wagner was released on DVD as a ten-part miniseries. Despite the fact that the separate installments are billed as episodes, only the first episode has opening credits, and only the last episode has closing credits, with all other episodes beginning and ending with abrupt scene changes.

=== Episode 1 ===
Opening in 1849, Richard Wagner is a respected composer living in Dresden, where he works as royal court conductor for the King of Saxony, Friedrich August II, and he is trying to arrange the first performance of his recently composed opera Lohengrin. Although his wife, Minna, enjoys their life and status, Wagner is bored with his work for the ageing king and spends most of his time writing revolutionary pamphlets against the establishment and aristocracy. Eventually, the May Uprising breaks out and Wagner becomes an important figure behind it. When Saxon and Prussian troops crush the uprising, Wagner becomes a wanted man and is forced to flee to Zürich.

=== Episode 2 ===
After refusing to join her husband for quite some time, Minna eventually agrees to move to Zürich to be reunited with Wagner. She manages to persuade him to start conducting and composing again and urges him to travel to France. In Bordeaux, Wagner meets a wealthy Scottish emigree, Mrs. Taylor, who agrees to become a patron of his, although he has a brief affair with her married daughter, Jessie Laussot. Upon traveling to Paris, Wagner is ordered to leave the city at once and return to Zürich. In Zürich he meets up with his good friend Franz Liszt, who arranges to perform Wagner's operas in Germany during his exile. While in Switzerland, he begins his first work on Der Ring des Nibelungen and plans an opera about Wayland the Smith. He also takes on a pupil, Karl Ritter, the son of another patron, Mrs. Ritter.

=== Episode 3 ===
In the 1850s, Wagner's health deteriorates and he has to be cured in a sanatorium, where he reads Arthur Schopenhauer's work Die Welt als Wille und Vorstellung. At his return, Mathilde Wesendonck, the wife of wealthy silk merchant Otto Wesendonck, becomes yet another one of his patrons and offers him the cottage on her estate as his residence. Once installed in the cottage, Wagner begins a passionate correspondence with Mathilde, which upsets both Mathilde's husband, Otto, and Wagner's wife, Minna, who seeks solace in increasing amounts of laudanum. Wagner, who starts composing Tristan und Isolde for Mathilde, is also visited by his good friend Hans von Bülow, and his new bride Cosima, Liszt's daughter. After a while, Minna works up the courage to confront Wagner and Mathilde about their correspondence.

=== Episode 4 ===
Wagner moves to Venice to finish Tristan und Isolde. When Karl Ritter informs him that Mrs Ritter is no longer able to provide Wagner with money, he ends their friendship and travels to Paris. There, he is ordered by the French emperor Napoleon III to stage a new version of his famous opera Tannhäuser. However, the show is a fiasco and riots break out during the performance, out of artistic (Wagner insisted on having a ballet in the first act, instead of the second, as it was customary) and political reasons (the involvement of one of Wagner's patrons, the Austrian Princess Metternich, was exploited to protest against the pro-Austrian policies of the French emperor). Moreover, shortly before the performance, Wagner has a dispute with the Jewish composer Giacomo Meyerbeer about his anti-semitic essay Das Judenthum in der Musik.

=== Episode 5 ===
After the failure in Paris, Wagner travels around Europe to Switzerland, Austria and Russia. While looking for financiers for the Ring and Die Meistersinger von Nürnberg, he meets the influential critic Eduard Hanslick in Vienna. He also tries staging Tristan und Isolde in Vienna, but is unsuccessful. Meanwhile, Minna continues to plead with the Dresden court for amnesty for Richard, which is eventually granted. Wagner returns but is chased away when creditors come looking for him. Destitute, Wagner tries to hide but is eventually found by Pfistermeister, personal secretary to the new King of Bavaria, who is desperate to meet him.

=== Episode 6 ===
After moving to Munich in 1864, Wagner enjoys a prosperous time under the patronage of the young King of Bavaria, Ludwig II. Most of his debts are settled and several of his operas are staged to great success. Meanwhile, Wagner has an affair with Cosima, wife of his good friend Hans von Bülow, much to the dismay of Cosima's father, Franz Liszt. Although Wagner and Ludwig have become close friends, the King's ministers and the people of Bavaria are weary of Wagner. Wagner eventually has a falling-out with the King when he asks Ludwig to pay for a portrait of Wagner which is painted as a gift to Ludwig himself.

=== Episode 7 ===
One year later in 1865, Wagner must reconcile with the King and eventually does so. Their friendship grows even stronger while Ludwig's ministers are becoming increasingly suspicious of Wagner and his ever-increasing demands for money. The premiere of Tristan und Isolde has to be postponed when the lead actress Malvina Schnorr von Carolsfeld falls ill but finally happens a few months later. Meanwhile, Wagner begins dictating his autobiography Mein Leben, and his friend Gottfried Semper made the first plans for the opera house that Wagner had planned for a long time.

Ludwig leaves the premiere before the end to travel into the night on board the royal train. When Bavaria faces external challenges (the danger of a war with Prussia under Otto von Bismarck) and Wagner's lifestyle becomes too extravagant for the Bavarian people, Ludwig is finally forced to banish Wagner from his country. In the meantime, Cosima gives birth to Wagner's daughter, Isolde, while Minna dies alone, neglected by Wagner. A little later, Wagner is shocked to learn of the death of the lead actor Ludwig Schnorr von Carolsfeld.

=== Episode 8 ===
In 1866, Wagner moves to Tribschen, near Lucerne, with Cosima and her children. He is later joined by King Ludwig who wishes to abdicate in order to become Wagner's assistant. Wagner convinces him to return to Bavaria, where war with Prussia erupts and ends quickly with an Austro-Bavarian defeat.

Hans von Bülow eventually also visits in Lucerne and Cosima asks him for a divorce, which he refuses. Despite a press campaign exposes the fact that Wagner lives with Von Bülow's wife, Wagner and Cosima successfully ask King Ludwig to restore their public reputation. When Hans is overly tired by his work for Wagner, he leaves, and Wagner hires Hans Richter as his new assistant. The three of them are visited by Friedrich Nietzsche, and in 1869 Cosima gives birth to Wagner's son, Siegfried.

=== Episode 9 ===
The war between Prussia and France begins in 1870 and concludes early the following year with a quick victory for Prussia, which finally realises Wagner's lifelong dream of a fully united Germany. During this time, Wagner marries Cosima and has the Siegfried Idyll performed in their villa as a birthday present for Cosima.

He is ordered by Ludwig to stage his opera Das Rheingold. When Wagner decides to postpone the opera, one day before the premiere, he and Ludwig have a falling-out. Wagner is denied access to the theatre and decides to build his own opera house in Bayreuth.

=== Episode 10 ===
In the 1870s, construction on the opera house in Bayreuth begins and the epic Der Ring des Nibelungen can finally be premiered. The opening August 1876 performance is attended by Ludwig who is slowly losing his mind, while living in his gigantic new castle Neuschwanstein. Wagner and Nietzsche have a falling-out over Wagner's lifestyle and ideas (including his rampant anti-semitism). Later in 1882, Wagner stages his last opera, Parsifal, under the conductor Hermann Levi.

Shortly before his death in February 1883, the aged Wagner travels to Venice, Italy with his family. There, he reflects with Liszt on his life: the people he has known, the events that occurred and the music he composed.

== Novel ==
Wagner by A. C. H. Smith. In German and Italian (1983) ISBN 3-453-01837-0. English-language edition (2012) ISBN 978-1-85135-035-3. Now available also in English

For more details see "A. C. H. Smith, Wagner novelisation".
