= Die Rheinnixen =

1864 romantic opera by Jacques Offenbach

Jacques Offenbach by Nadar, c. 1860s

Die Rheinnixen (French: Les fées du Rhin; English The Rhine Nixies) is a romantic opera in four acts by Jacques Offenbach. The original libretto by Charles-Louis-Étienne Nuitter was translated into German by Alfred von Wolzogen.

The Elves' Song from Die Rheinnixen was later used in The Tales of Hoffmann, where it became the "Barcarolle" (Belle nuit, ô nuit d'amour) in the 'Giulietta' act; Conrad's drinking song was also re-used in the same act.

== Performance history ==
The first performance was given in a truncated form (owing to the illness of the tenor Alois Ander) on 4 February 1864 at the Hoftheater in Vienna (Theater am Kärntnertor).

The first full performance was given in concert at the Corum, Montpellier, on 30 July 2002 with Regina Schörg (Armgard), Nora Gubisch (Hedwig), Piotr Beczała (Franz), Dalibor Jenis (Conrad), and Peter Klaveness (Gottfried), and the Orchestre National de Montpellier, conducted by Friedemann Layer, which was recorded. The first fully staged performance was given in Ljubljana by the Slovenian National Opera under Dieter Rossberg on 13 January 2005. Performances followed in Trier and at the Opéra de Lyon under Marc Minkowski later in 2005, and in Cottbus in 2006. (These performances, as at the Vienna premiere, were all given in German.) New Sussex Opera gave the British premiere of the work, under the title The Rhine Fairies, in October 2009, conducted by Nicholas Jenkins, with libretto translated into English by Neil Jenkins.

== Roles ==
Roles, voice types, premiere cast
Role	Voice type	Premiere cast, 4 February 1864
Conrad von Wenckheim, leader of the elector of the Palatinate's mercenaries	baritone	Beck
Franz Вaldung, a mercenary captain, originally from the locality	tenor	Alois Ander
Gottfried, a hunter	bass	Mayerhofer
Hedwig, tenant of a Sickingen farm on the Rhine	mezzo-soprano	Destinn
Armgard, her daughter	soprano	Wildauer
A fairy	soprano	
First mercenary	tenor	Willem
Second mercenary	baritone	Soutscheck
A farmer	tenor	Campe
Winegrowers, peasants, mercenaries, elves, and fairies

== Synopsis ==
Place: In and around the castle of Franz von Sickingen, near Kreuznach on the Rhine
Time: During the Knights' War of the 16th century

=== Act 1 ===
Hedwig's farmhouse

Peasants return from the vineyards near Bingen on the Rhine, singing of the fertility of the land. Gottfried leads a thanksgiving prayer as they approach the house of Hedwig. Hedwig tells Gottfried that she fears for the safety of their lands: she curses war, and worries about her daughter Armgard's melancholy frame of mind. Armgard sings constantly to conceal a hidden grief, and Hedwig recounts a ballad of the fate of young women who sang too much. By refusing to cease her singing, she gives her mother cause to worry that she too will succumb like the spirits in her ballad. Gottfried declares his love for Armgard, an attachment supported by Hedwig. Armgard is, however, unable to accept his devotion, as she reveals that Franz Baldung, her true love, has joined a troop of mercenaries led by the violent Conrad von Wenckheim. Gottfried offers to help bring Franz back, but the peace is broken by the news that plundering mercenaries have attacked nearby farmsteads.

The pillaging troops led by Conrad enter, singing of wine and women, along with Franz, delirious, having lost his memory after a blow to his head, and recalling little of his previous existence. Discovering that the soldiers have arrived on Armgard's name day, Conrad threatens to kill the family unless she sings for them. As Armgard sings she notices Franz among the soldiers. Franz begins to recover his memory, slowly awakens to his past and wants to intervene. Having sung the 'Vaterlandslied' Armgard faints, and Franz recognizes her.

=== Act 2 ===
Inside Hedwig's farmhouse

Gottfried and the women lament the death of Armgard. The folk legend decrees that Armgard's ghost will go off at dusk to join elves at the enchanted stone in the forest. Hedwig reveals to Gottfried that she was abandoned by the father of Armgard. She hurries to the forest, hoping to find Armgard's shadow, swiftly followed by Gottfried. Franz enters and sings of his love, then Conrad also arrives, forcing Franz to come away to attack Ebernburg Palace. Gottfried has been captured and will be bribed to guide them to it. At nightfall Armgard, alive but in a trance, passes through the scene, wanting to save Franz.

=== Act 3 ===
The Elfenstein in the forest: rocks, waterfalls, pines – moonlight

Elves and spirits dance and sing in the forest, where Hedwig appears. Armgard tries to pretend to her that she is a spirit, then hides. The men now arrive, expecting to be at the palace, and Conrad boasts of the licentious escapades of his youth. They then realize the trick Gottfried has played on them. He is tied up to be executed next day. Conrad is however sent into a trance by the song of the elves, and Hedwig cries out for revenge.

=== Act 4 ===
Kreuznach castle surrounded by rocks. Arms, gunpowder, cannons. Night.

Soldiers prepare for an attack. After Franz has threatened suicide unless he sees Armgard, whom he thinks is now a fairy, she enters, explains all that has happened, and they are reconciled in their love. She tells him that their troubles have been a dream and their suffering will give way to renewed love. They leave. Hedwig is dragged in by soldiers. After interrogation she and Conrad recognize each other and she reveals that he is Armgard's father; he thinks he has killed her by forcing her to sing. Gottfried is brought in chains, but once his captors have gone Conrad frees him. Armgard, Franz, Hedwig, and Conrad decide to flee together, but the mercenaries rush in. The elves cast a spell after which some fall into a ravine, while others go off into the next valley. The palace, the local people and local fatherland are all saved.

== Musical highlights ==
Rodney Milnes notes several musical highlights in the score: the overture, with the calm 'barcarolle' contrasted with war-like music, Armgard's Vaterlandslied and Franz's entrance aria in act 1, Franz's 12/8 romance with horn plus a trio bouffe for three men in act 2, the ballet music and a duet for mother and daughter in act 3, and two powerful duets in the last act. The work concludes with a combination of the barcarolle and the Vaterlandslied. Its text is:

O könnt' ich's allen sagen,
Wie meine Pulse schlagen
Für dich, mein Vaterland!
Ich habe dir mein Leben,
Mein Alles hingegeben.
Ich nehm das Glas zur Hand
Und trink' es dir und ruf' es laut:
Du, Vaterland, bist meine Braut!
Du liebes Land, du schönes Land!
Du großes, deutsches Vaterland!

Wer sollte dich nicht ehren,
Nicht deinen Ruhm begehren,
O Heimat hold und traut!
Wo stolze Burgen thronen,
Wo treue Menschen wohnen,
Wo Sangeslust so laut:
Da muss am schönen grünen Rhein
Ein Leben voller Wonne sein!
O liebes Land, o schönes Land,
O schönes, großes, deutsches Vaterland!

O if I were only able to tell everyone
How my heart beats
For thee, my fatherland!
I have given thee my life,
I have given thee everything.
I take the glass
And toast thee and shout loudly:
Thou, my fatherland, art my bride!
Thou art a lovely and beautiful country!
Thou art my big, German fatherland!

Who should not honour thee,
Who should not crave thy glory,
O, my dear country, comely and intimate!
Where proud castles are enthroned,
Where faithful people live,
Where everyone loves to sing:
There, on the beautiful green Rhine,
Life must be full of delight!
O lovely land, o beautiful land,
O beautiful, big, German fatherland!

== Recordings ==
- 2002: Regina Schörg, Nora Gubisch, Piotr Beczała, Dalibor Jenis; Opéra Orchestre national Montpellier, Friedemann Layer Universal / Accord CD 472 920-2 (in German)
