= Schörg =

Schörg is a surname. Notable people with the surname include:

- Gretl Schörg (1914–2006), Austrian operatic soprano
- Regina Schörg (born 1969), Austrian operatic soprano
- Joe Schorgl (1922-2014), American politician from Missouri
