= Heinrich Gudehus =

German opera singer (1845–1909)

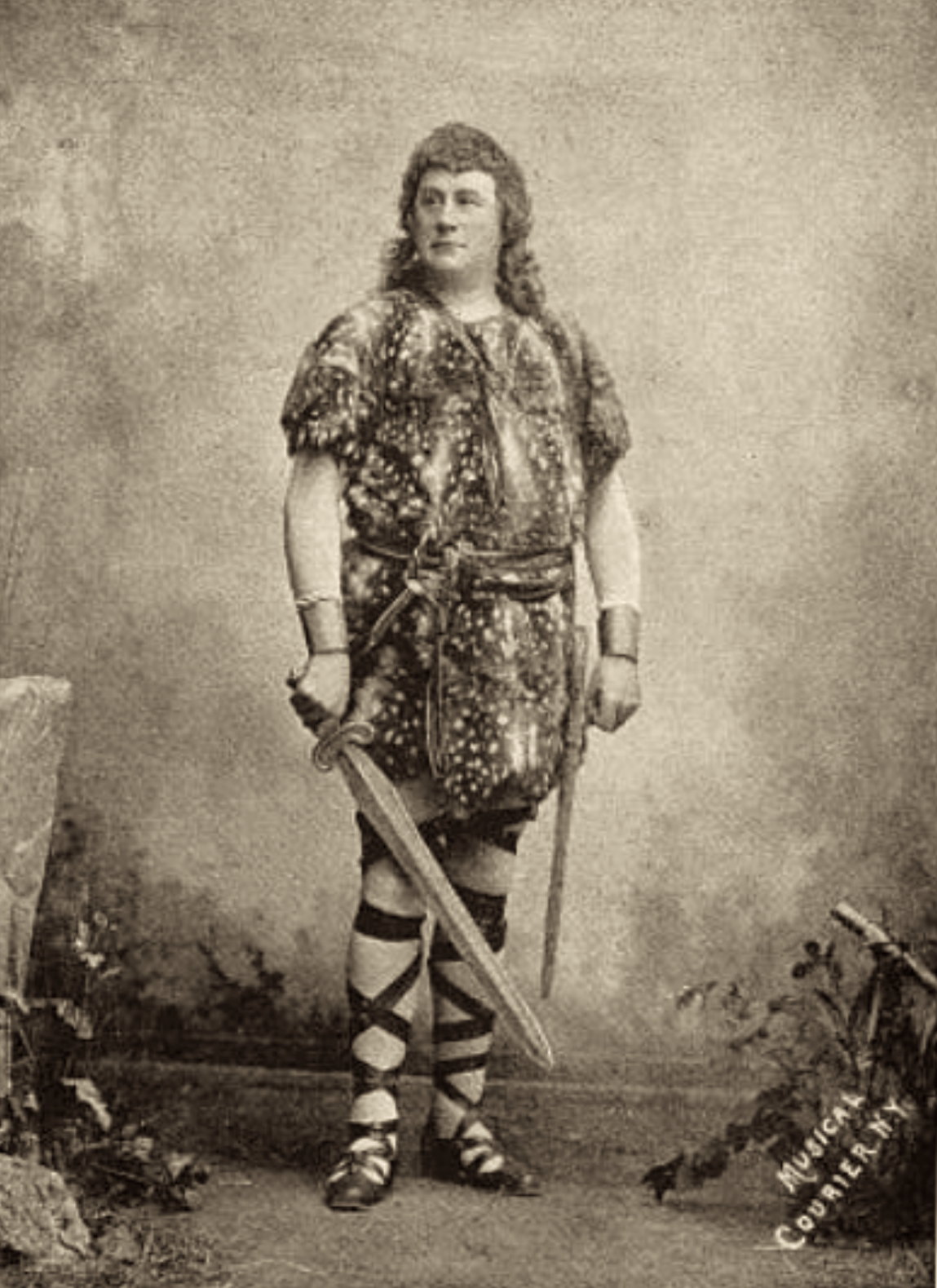
Heinrich Gudehus as Wagner's Siegfried.

Heinrich Gudehus (March 30, 1845 – October 9, 1909) was a German operatic tenor who was particularly celebrated for his performances in the operas of Richard Wagner and in the dramatic French opera repertoire.

== Early life ==
The son of Heinrich Wilhelm and his wife Marie Dorothee Gudehus (née Martens), Heinrich Gudehus was born in Altenhagen, Celle on March 30, 1845. In his youth he studied both the piano and organ with court organist Heinrich Wilhelm Stolze.

Following in the footsteps of his father who was a teacher, he began his professional life as an educator in 1866; working in that capacity over the next several years in Celle and Goslar. He concurrently worked as the organist at the Marktkirche St. Cosmas und Damian (Goslar). On July 17, 1866, he married Caroline Johanne Klippel in Celle. Their marriage ended tragically when she died after giving birth to a stillborn child on May 2, 1867. He married Caroline's sister, Dorothee Friedrike, on December 20, 1868. She also died early in the marriage on December 7, 1869.

== Singing career ==
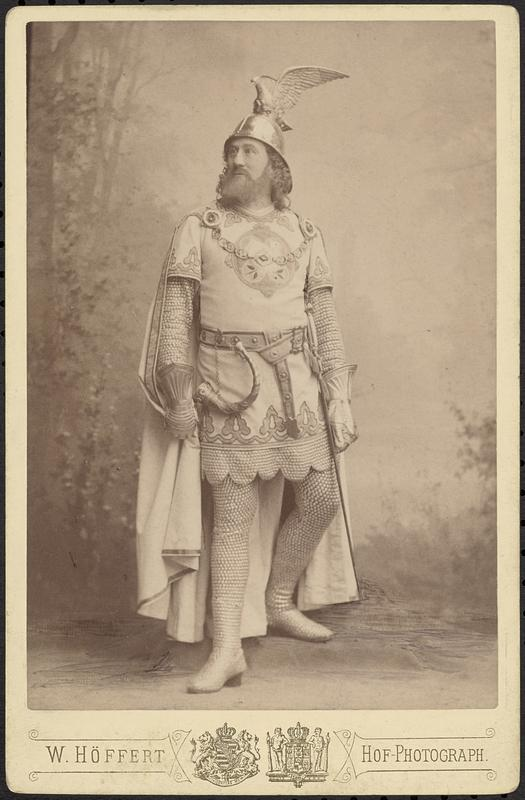
Gudehus as Lohengrin.

Gudehus abandoned his teaching career in order to train as an opera singer. He studied with soprano Malvina Garrigues in Braunschweig and Gustav Engel in Berlin before becoming a pupil of Luise Ress with whom he studied in Berlin from 1872 to 1875. He made his professional opera debut at the Royal Opera, Berlin on January 7, 1871, as Nadori in Louis Spohr's Jessonda. Not long after he had success there in the role of Tamino in The Magic Flute. He left the company to complete his vocal training with Ress.

In the 1875–1876 season Gudehus was committed to the Latvian National Opera where he first appeared as Raoul de Nangis in Giacomo Meyerbeer's Les Huguenots. The following season he was engaged by Theater Lübeck after which he was at Theater Freiburg in 1877–1878 season. On May 22, 1877, he married Elisabeth Tovote in Meppen. Their marriage produced two sons and two daughters. From 1878 through 1880 he was a resident artist at Theater Bremen. During this time he appeared as a guest artist at the Hamburg State Opera in 1878.

Gudehus worked as a principal member of the Semperoper in Dresden from 1880 to 1890; making he debut with the company in the title role of Lohengrin. Some of the parts he sang there included Siegfried in a complete staging of The Ring Cycle in 1885 and Tristan in Tristan und Isolde in 1886. Wagner traveled specifically to Dresden to hear him sing in 1881 which led to a contract at the Bayreuth Festival. He made multiple appearances at Bayreuth between 1882 and 1889; making his debut there in the title role of Parsifal on July 28, 1882. It was notably only the second time that opera had been staged at that point in history. Other appearances at Bayreuth included Tristan in Tristan und Isolde in 1886 and Walther von Stolzing in Die Meistersinger von Nürnberg in 1888.

Gudehus performed Walther von Stolzing for his debut at the Royal Opera House in London on June 4, 1884. His other repertoire in London included Max in Der Freischütz, Tristan, Walther von Stolzing, and the title roles in Lohengrin and Tannhäuser. He also performed the title role in a concert version of Parsifal at Royal Albert Hall in 1884. Other guest appearances included performances at the Oper Frankfurt and the Vienna State Opera in 1885–1886.

Gudehus performed Tannhäuser for his debut at the Metropolitan Opera on November 28, 1890. Other parts he sang at the Met included Florestan in Fidelio, Jean of Leyden in Le Prophète, Raoul de Nangis, Siegfried in Götterdämmerung, Siegmund in Die Walküre, Tannhäuser, and Tristan. After one season in New York he returned to the Royal Opera, Berlin where he performed until his retirement from the stage in 1896.

== Later life ==
In his later life he worked as a voice teacher in Dresden. He died in Dresden on October 9, 1909. He is buried at Alter Annenfriedhof cemetery.
