= László Gálffi =

Hungarian actor

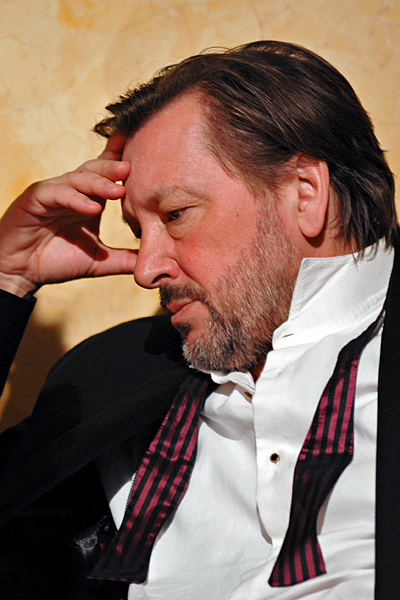
Gálffi in 2008

László Gálffi (born 16 November 1952) is a Hungarian actor. He was born in Budapest.

One of his better known roles is that of King Ludwig II of Bavaria in Tony Palmer's epic film production of Wagner, in which Galffi acted alongside Richard Burton, John Gielgud, Ralph Richardson, Laurence Olivier and Vanessa Redgrave.

He played the part of Frédéric Chopin in the 1982 Hungarian TV film Liszt Ferenc, about the life of Franz Liszt. Galffi also plays Rossa in the 1999 film, Sunshine, also starring Ralph Fiennes.
