= Ludwig Schnorr von Carolsfeld =

German opera singer

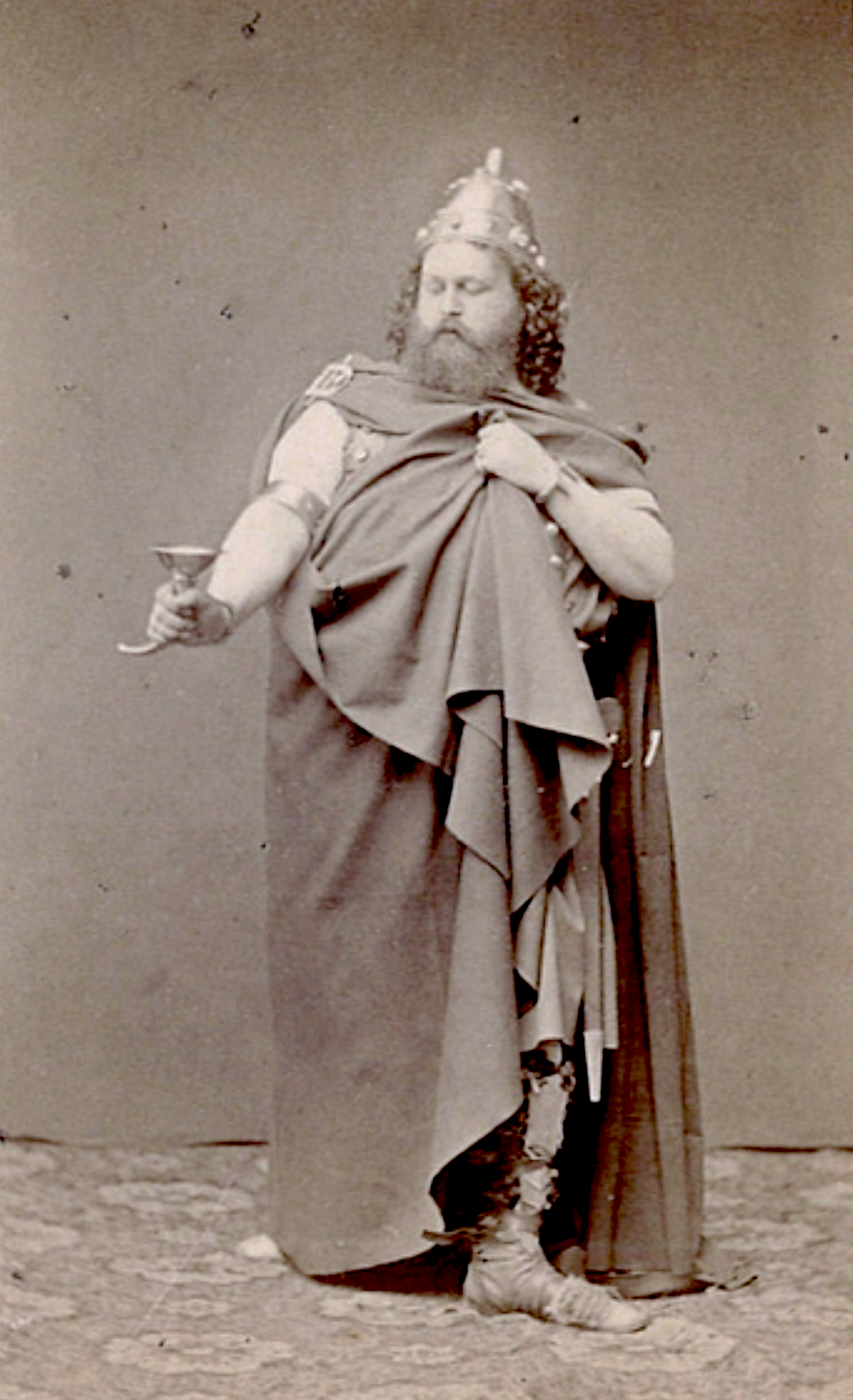
Ludwig Schnorr von Carolsfeld as Wagner's Tannhäuser.

Ludwig Schnorr von Carolsfeld (2 July 1836 – 21 July 1865) was a German heldentenor. The son of painter Julius Schnorr von Carolsfeld, he was trained as a vocalist at the Kreuzschule in Dresden and the Leipzig Conservatory. He was a resident artist at the Karlsruhe Hofoper from 1854–1860, and the Semperoper in Dresden from 1860–1865.

Schnorr von Carolsfeld is best known for creating the role of Tristan in Richard Wagner's opera Tristan und Isolde at its 1865 world premiere at the Bavarian State Opera in Munich; portraying that role opposite his wife, the soprano Malvina Garrigues, as Isolde. He died at the age of 29 just weeks after the premiere of this opera from a chill followed by rheumatic fever leading to an apoplexic event to which the overweight tenor succumbed. His early death created a mythos in the opera world with legend attributing his demise to the enormous exertions required of a Wagnerian heldentenor. While he possessed a strong voice especially suited to operatic works by Wagner and Giuseppe Verdi, he was also capable of performing repertoire more commonly associated with the lyric tenor fach.

== Early life, education, and initial career in Karlsruhe ==
Ludwig Schnorr von Carolsfeld was born in Munich on 2 July 1836. He was the son of the famous painter Julius Schnorr von Carolsfeld, and nephew of artist Ludwig Ferdinand Schnorr von Carolsfeld. He began his musical education at the Kreuzschule in Dresden, and then pursued further studies at the Leipzig Conservatory where he was a pupil of Julius Otto.

While still a student in Leipzig, Schnorr von Carolsfeld was hired by Eduard Devrient to perform at the Karlsruhe Hofoper. He then continued his vocal training by taking private lessons with Devrient. He made his professional opera debut at that theatre in 1854 in the minor role of Naphtali in Étienne Méhul's Joseph. Later that same year he performed the small part of a soldier in Giacomo Meyerbeer's Les Huguenots in a production that starred his future wife, the Danish soprano Malvina Garrigues, in the role of Valentine. Malvina and Ludwig became engaged in 1857 and married in April 1860. Malvina was eleven years older than Ludwig, and she would outlive the tenor by nearly forty years.

In 1855 Schnorr von Carolsfeld continued to perform in smaller parts at the Karlsruhe Hofoper in Vincenzo Bellini's Norma and Carl Maria von Weber's Der Freischütz. He eventually was appointed a principal tenor at Karlsruhe in 1858, and had his first major success of his career at that theatre in the title role of Meyerbeer's Robert le diable. This achievement led to engagements as a guest artist in leading roles at the Hoftheater Wiesbaden, the Staatstheater Mainz, the Altes Theater in Düsseldorf, and the Comoedienhaus in Frankfurt.

== Later life and career in Dresden ==
In 1860 Schnorr von Carolsfeld left his position at the Karlsruhe Hofoper to join the roster of resident principal artists at the Semperoper in Dresden. He remained in that position until his death five years later. At that opera house he was particularly celebrated for his performances in the operas of Richard Wagner; achieving particular acclaim in the title roles of Tannhäuser and Lohengrin. In February 1861 Ludwig sang Lohengrin as a guest artist at the Bavarian State Opera; a performance which was attended by King Ludwig II of Bavaria. This performance sparked a passion for Wagner's music within the King, which led to a series of stagings of Wagner's operas at the command of the king between the years 1862-1864.

Schnorr von Carolsfeld was also admired for his work in the operas of Giuseppe Verdi. In 1860 he portrayed Manrico in the Dresden premiere of Verdi's Il trovatore. Other roles in his repertoire varied from lighter lyric tenor parts to heavier dramatic roles, including Pollione in Norma, Tamino in The Magic Flute, Arnold in Guillaume Tell, Edgardo in Lucia di Lammermoor, Florestan in Fidelio, Gennaro in Lucrezia Borgia, John of Leyden in Le Prophète, and Raoul in Les Huguenots.

In addition to his work in opera, Schnorr von Carolsfeld also had success in Dresden as a singer of lieder and oratorio works. He also dabbled in work as a painter, poet, and composer.

=== Tristan und Isolde and an early death ===
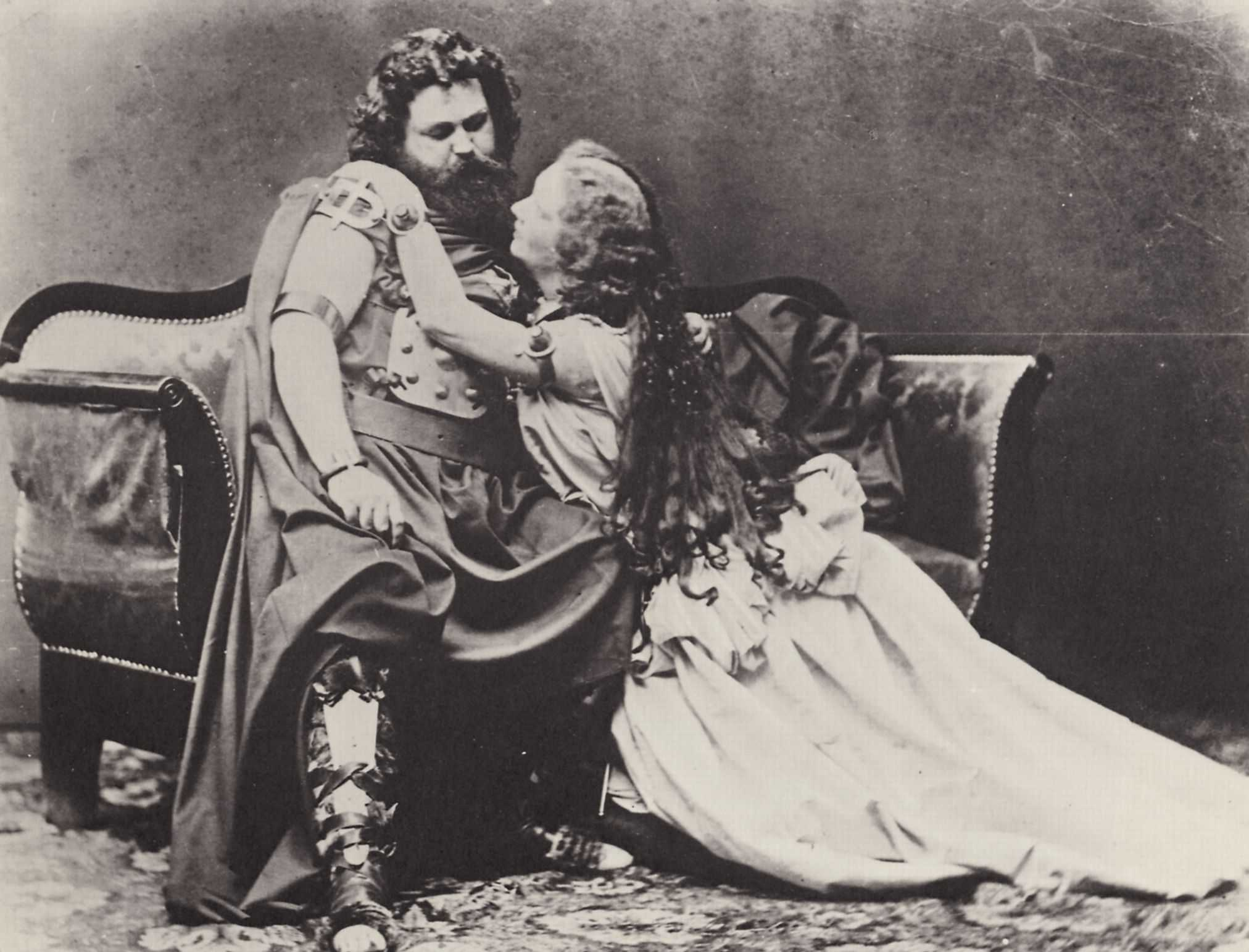
Ludwig and Malvina (or Malvine) Schnorr von Carolsfeld costumed as Tristan and Isolde

In 1862 Schnorr von Carolsfeld drew the attention of Richard Wagner when the composer attended a performance of Lohengrin at the Karlsruhe Hofoper in which the tenor sang the title part in a return to that theatre as a guest artist. Highly impressed with Schnorr von Carolsfeld's singing, Wagner approached the tenor with an offer to sing the role of Tristan in his new opera Tristan und Isolde. Wagner provided Ludwig and his wife Malvina with a copy of the score, and the couple sang through parts of the opera with Wagner at the piano. Wagner was particularly impressed with Ludwig's aesthetic sensibilities and intelligence.

Later in 1862, Wagner was approached by the Vienna State Opera with an offer to stage the premiere of Tristan und Isolde, and at that time Wagner suggested to that theatre that Ludwig and Malvina Schnorr von Carolsfeld be cast in the title parts. However, this suggestion was rejected as the Vienna State Opera had its own group of artists under contract. Accordingly, Luise Meyer-Dustmann was cast as Isolde, and the part of Tristan was given to Alois Ander when the opera went into rehearsal in Vienna.

The Vienna production of Tristan und Isolde was ill fated. Anders was plagued with memory problems, and complained that the Act III monologue was impossible to sing. He ultimately lost his voice, and not long after the soprano, Meyer-Dustmann, was also having vocal problems singing her part. Sources vary as to the number of rehearsals that happened in Vienna before the opera was abandoned in April 1863, with one source claiming a total of fifty-four rehearsals, some fifty-seven rehearsals, and others 77 rehearsals.

With the assistance of King Ludwig II, a second attempt to give a first staging of Tristan und Isolde was made, this time in Munich. On 10 June 1865, a month before his death, Schnorr von Carolsfeld and his wife created the title roles in the world premiere of Wagner's Tristan und Isolde at the Bavarian State Opera. Ludwig had a triumphant success as Tristan at the premiere, and sang the role four more times to critical acclaim. The success of the opera at its premiere is largely attributed to Ludwig and Malvina's performances.

Despite the success of his performance as Tristan, Schnorr von Carolsfeld was physically taxed by the demands of the role, and he developed a fever soon after. He continued to work while ill, with his final performance in an opera being Erik in The Flying Dutchman on 9 July 1865. He gave another performance on the following 12 July at a musical soiree organized by Ludwig II in which he sang excerpts from three as yet unperformed operas by Wagner: Die Meistersinger von Nürnberg, Die Walküre, and Siegfried. He developed rheumatic fever leading to a stroke, and he died in Dresden on the following 21 July just 19 days after his 29th birthday. He was in rehearsals for the part of Don Ottavio in Mozart's Don Giovanni at the time of his death, and was scheduled to sing the role the day after he died.

Schnorr von Carolsfed's death shortly after performing the difficult role of Tristan created a mythos around "the perils of Wagner's art." While medically attributed to heart failure, Schnorr von Carolsfeld's death created a legend around the challenges of singing the character of Tristan; with some claiming the physical demands of singing the role were responsible for his premature death at the age of 29. Others, have linked Ludwig's death to several other misfortunes plaguing artists connected to Wagner, including the suicide of pianist Joseph Rubinstein and the death of tenor Alois Ander in 1864, the latter of whom was plagued with insanity not long after rehearsing the role of Tristan in 1862-1863. The French poet Charles Baudelaire went so far as to accuse Wagner's music of being a part of "satanic religion" and using the tragic death of Schnorr von Carolsfed as evidence that "Wagner's music tapped into devilish forces".

In his diary, Wagner blamed himself for Schnorr von Carolsfed's early death, and he believed he pushed the singer too far. Wagner wrote the following about Ludwig Schnorr von Carolsfeld after his death, "In him I lost … the great granite block needed to raise my building, and found myself directed to seek his replacement in a pile of bricks."

== Notes, references and sources ==
References
