= Malvina Garrigues =

Danish-born Portuguese operatic dramatic soprano (1825 - 1904)

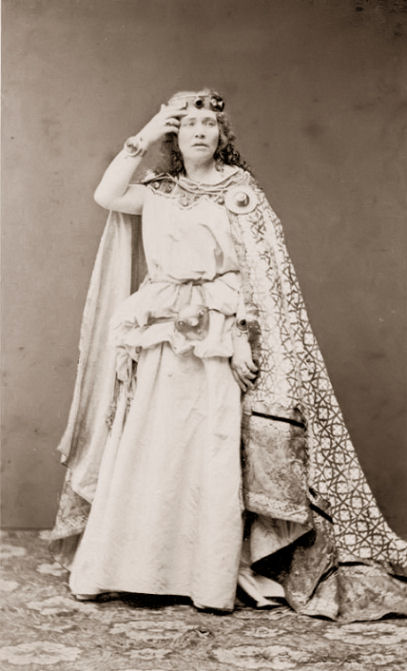
Malvina Garrigues Schnorr von Carolsfeld in the Wagnerian role of Isolde

Eugénia Malvina Garrigues (later Malvina Schnorr von Carolsfeld; 7 December 1825 – 8 February 1904), was a Danish-born Portuguese operatic dramatic soprano.

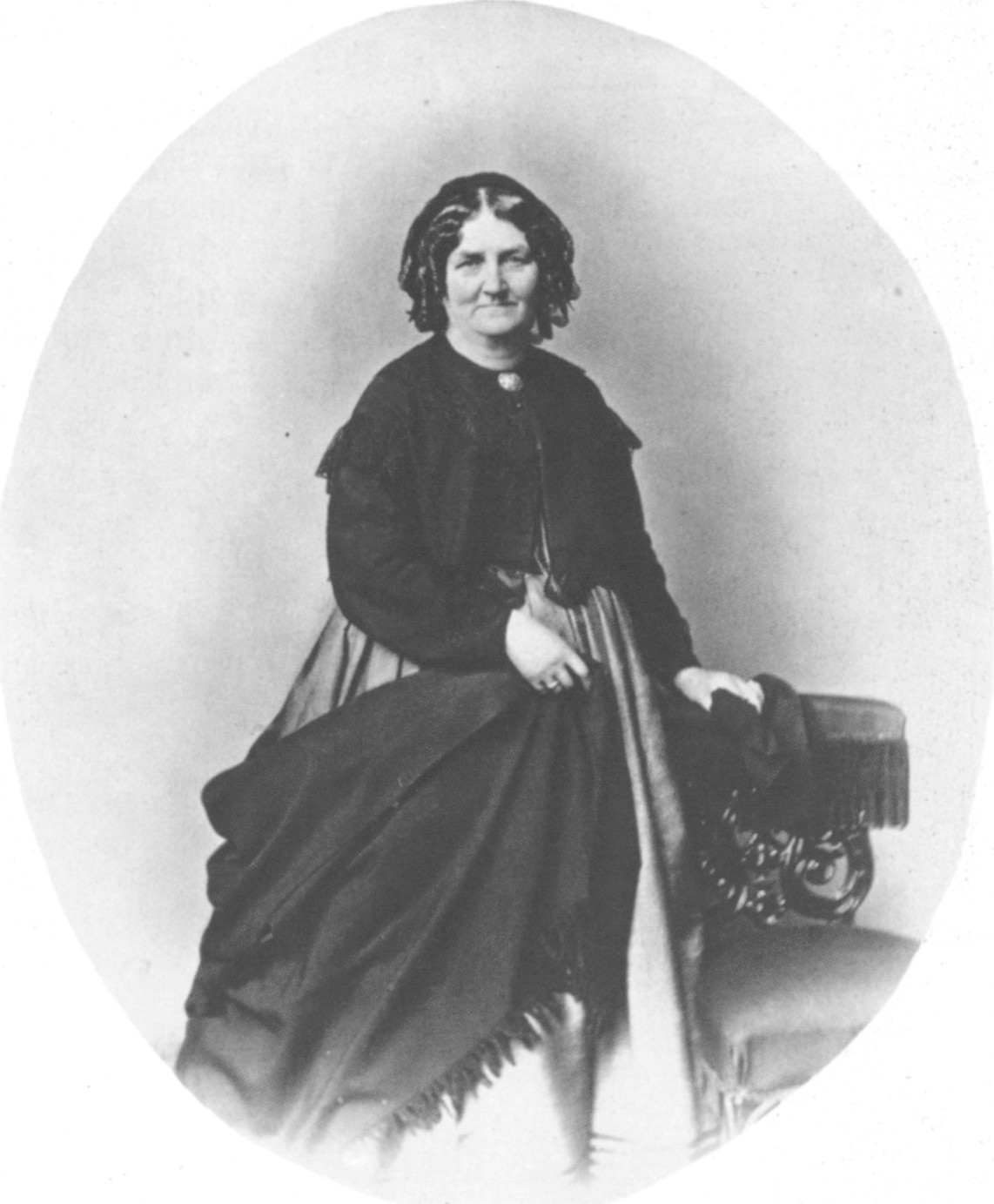
Malvina Garrigues Schnorr von Carolsfeld

== Early life and education ==
Eugénia Malvina Garrigues was born a Portuguese citizen in Copenhagen, Denmark, the daughter of the Portuguese consul there, João António Henriques Garrigues (Jean Antoine Henri Garrigues), and his German wife of French descent, Nanette Palmier. Portugal's Queen Maria II assigned her father as consul to Denmark by decree of 17 November 1825. She was great-grandniece of David Garrick. Her first cousin was the noted Danish-American medical doctor Henry Jacques Garrigues.

== Career ==
She studied in Paris with Manuel Patricio Rodríguez García.

She made her debut in Giacomo Meyerbeer's Robert le diable in Breslau in 1841, where she sang until 1849. From 1849 to 1853 she worked at the ducal Hoftheater at Coburg, and in Gotha and Hamburg. In 1854 she was engaged by the Karlsruhe Opera, where she met Ludwig Schnorr von Carolsfeld, who was ten years her junior. They appeared there together in such operas as Les Huguenots. They became engaged in 1857 and married in April 1860. The same year they were engaged by the Dresden Court Opera.

After conducting 70 rehearsals of his Tristan und Isolde in Vienna and still finding the singers wanting, Richard Wagner turned to Malvina and Ludwig Schnorr von Carolsfeld to create the roles. The premiere was set for 15 May 1865 in Munich, but had to be postponed to 10 June owing to Malvina's hoarseness.

After Ludwig's sudden and untimely death at the age of 29 on 21 July 1865, only six weeks after the premiere, Malvina sank into a deep depression and never sang again. She took up spiritualism, and was influenced by one of her mediumistic pupils to believe she was destined to marry Wagner. This caused her to be deeply jealous of Cosima von Bülow, who was living openly with Wagner at Tribschen, and she tried to create a rift between them.

She later taught singing at Frankfurt; her pupils included Heinrich Gudehus and Rosalie Miller.

Malvina Garrigues Schnorr von Carolsfeld also wrote a small number of songs dedicated to Jenny Lind, to texts by Heinrich Heine and Lord Byron. She published some poetry by herself and her husband.

She died in Karlsruhe in 1904, aged 78, was cremated in Heidelberg, and her ashes are located in Dresden.

She has been the subject of a 1995 stage show by Klaus Geitel, Oh Malvina!, created by Gwyneth Jones with linking narrations spoken by Christopher Lee; Jones had also played her in the 1983 film Wagner.
