= Friedemann Layer =

Austrian conductor (1941–2019)

Friedemann Layer (30 October 1941 – 3 November 2019) was an Austrian conductor. He was assistant to Herbert von Karajan in Ulm and to Karl Böhm. In 1989, he conducted a film version of Der Schauspieldirektor, with Zdzisława Donat and Christian Boesch in the cast.

Layer was chief conductor of the Opéra national de Montpellier from 1994 to 2007.

== Selected discography ==
- Henze - Symphony No 10; 4 Poemi; La Selva Incantata. Montpellier National Orchestra
- Mieczysław Karłowicz - Concerto for Violin and Orchestra. Montpellier Languedoc-Roussillon National Orchestra
- Alfano - Risurrezione Accord
- Offenbach - Die Rheinnixen Accord
- Respighi - La campana sommersa Accord
- Lidarti - Esther oratorio in Hebrew. Accord.
- Ponchielli - Marion Delorme Accord
- Zoltán Kodály - Háry János sung in Hungarian, with French narration by Gérard Depardieu. Accord
- Cilea - L'arlesiana Accord
- Antoine Mariotte - Salomé Accord
