= Gustav Engel (musician) =

German tenor

Gustav Eduard Engel (29 October 1823 – 19 July 1895) was a German tenor, music theorician, music educator and music journalist.

== Life ==
Born in Königsberg, after attending grammar school in Gdańsk, Engel studied philology at the Humboldt University of Berlin and was awarded a doctorate in 1847. He went afterwards to the Evangelisches Gymnasium zum Grauen Kloster in Berlin as a probationary teacher.

He already learned to play the piano in Gdańsk and also listened to lectures on music during his studies in Berlin. In 1843, Engel joined the Sing-Akademie zu Berlin and in 1846 he became a member of the Staats- und Domchor Berlin with performances as a tenor soloist. After completing his probationary year as a teacher, he turned increasingly to the study of music theory. From 1853 he was "musical reporter" for the Spenersche Zeitung and from 1861 for the Vossische Zeitung. In 1863, he started to teach voice at Theodor Kullak's Neue Akademie der Tonkunst and in 1874 he was appointed professor at the Universität der Künste Berlin. One of his students was tenor Heinrich Gudehus.

In addition, Engel wrote several works on music theory and music education.

Engel died in Berlin at the age of 76.
