= Franz Seraph von Pfistermeister =

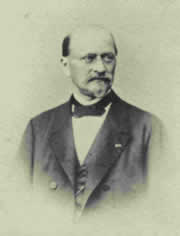
- Franz Seraph Freiherr von Pfistermeister, State Council of the Kingdom of Bavaria.
- Born: 14 December 1820; Amberg
- Died: 2 March 1912 (aged 91); Munich
- Occupation: State Council

Franz Seraph von Pfistermeister (14 December 1820 – 2 March 1912), was the court secretary and State Council of the Kingdom of Bavaria. Pfistermeister entered history not only in the domain of politics but also in the domain of music, when in his first official administrative function he was ordered by King Ludwig II to find the composer Richard Wagner and bring him to Munich.

== Life and work ==
Franz Seraph Freiherr von Pfistermeister was born on 14 December 1820 in Amberg, Germany. After attending the gymnasium in Amberg, Franz Pfistermeister began his career in the Royal Bavarian governmental service as military fiscal adjunct. In 1849 he was appointed to the Court Office in Munich, and by the year 1866 he then began working as Cabinet Secretary to Kings Maximilian II and Ludwig II.

Because of his opposition to Richard Wagner, (Note: Wagner was drawn into a plot conceived by Prince Maximilian Karl, 6th Prince of Thurn and Taxis to found a new kingdom for his eldest son Maximilian Anton Lamoral Erbprinz von Thurn und Taxis consisting of Rhineland-Westphalia and approximately half of Belgium. In order to succeed, a bank should have to be found, and indeed the Landgrand-Dumonceau agricultural Bank in Antwerp was created. Councillor Georg Klindworth from Brussels and Baron Franz Josef von Gruben from Regensburg, the Thurn und Taxis estate manager and a prominent figure in the Bavarian Catholic Party, offered Wagner capital in the form of bonus share in the recently formed bank to finance his plans. All that Wagner had to do was to use his influence with the king and persuade him into firing the hated ministers Pfistermeister and Karl Ludwig Freiherr von der Pfordten.) and his costly promotion by King Ludwig II in 1866, his dismissal from the 1866 service was "the highest immediate service". From 1864 to 1895 he served as State Council of the Kingdom of Bavaria. He died on the 2 March 1912 in his home on Knöbelstraße, Munich, where he lived from 1881. His grave with a landmarked bust is located in the old south cemetery in Munich.

== Additional information ==
=== References ===
Attribution

- This article is based on the translation of the corresponding article of the German Wikipedia. A list of contributors can be found there at the History section.

== Sources ==
- Karl Bosl: Bosls Bayerische Biographie. Pustet, Regensburg 1983, ISBN 3-7917-0792-2, p. 586
- Hermann Rumschöttel: Ludwig II. In: Alois Schmid (Hrsg.): Die Herrscher Bayerns. Beck, München 2001, ISBN 3-406-48230-9, p. 350
