= Joe Schorgl =

American politician

Member of the U.S. House of Representatives from Missouri's 24th district

Missouri House of Representatives
- In office 1969–1977

Personal details
- Born: 1922 Kansas City, Missouri, US
- Died: 2014 (aged 91–92)
- Resting place: Mount Olivet Cemetery near Raytown, Missouri
- Party: Democratic
- Spouse: Helen Rice
- Children: 3 daughters
- Occupation: electrical contractor

James Joseph "Joe" Schorgl (September 13, 1922 – September 19, 2014) was an American Democratic politician who served in the Missouri House of Representatives. He was born in Kansas City, Missouri, and was educated at Assumption Elementary School and Northeast High School in Kansas City. In 1949, he married Helen Rice. During World War II, he served in the 3rd Infantry Division. Schorgl worked for the Missouri Pacific Railroad.
