= Tristan und Isolde =

1865 opera by Richard Wagner

- Music drama by Richard Wagner
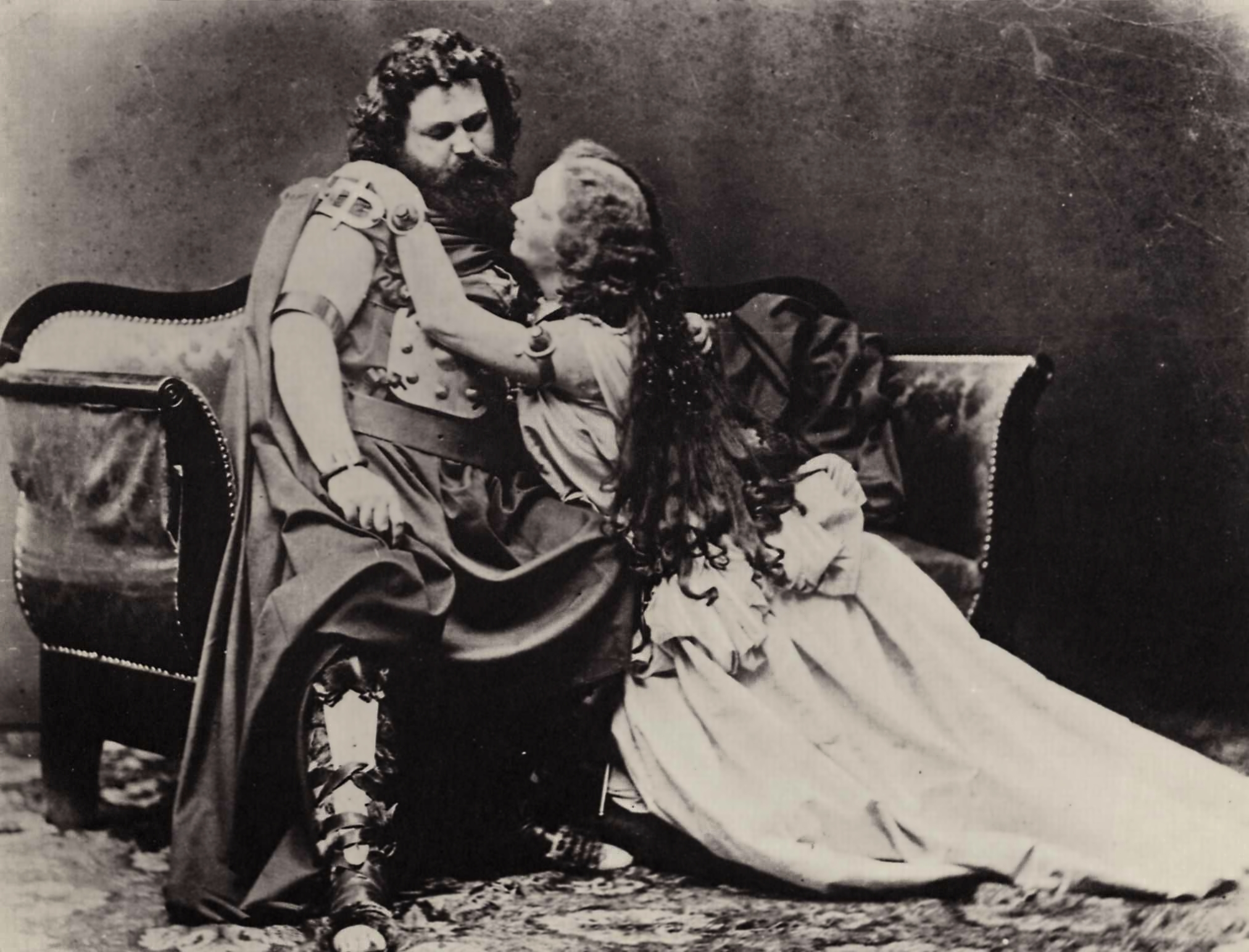
- Ludwig Schnorr von Carolsfeld and his wife Malvina starring as Tristan and Isolde in the first performance
- Librettist: Richard Wagner
- Language: German
- Based on: Tristan and Iseult by Gottfried von Strassburg
- Premiere: 10 June 1865; Königliches Hof- und Nationaltheater, Munich

Tristan und Isolde (Tristan and Isolde), WWV 90, is a music drama in three acts by Richard Wagner set to a German libretto by the composer, loosely based on Gottfried von Strassburg's medieval 12th-century romance Tristan and Iseult. First conceived in 1854, the music was composed between 1857 and 1859 and premiered at the Königliches Hoftheater und Nationaltheater in Munich on 10 June 1865, with Hans von Bülow conducting. While it is performed by opera companies, Wagner preferred the term Handlung (German for "plot" or "action") for Tristan to distinguish its structure of continuous narrative flow ("endless melody") as distinct from that of conventional opera at the time, which consisted of recitatives punctuated by showpiece arias, which Wagner regarded with great disdain.

Tristan und Isolde was inspired in part by the philosophy of Arthur Schopenhauer, and by Wagner's relationship with his muse Mathilde Wesendonck. It explores existential themes such as that of mankind's insatiable striving and the transcendental nature of love beyond death, and incorporates spirituality from Christian mysticism as well as Vedantic and Buddhist metaphysics, subjects that interested Schopenhauer. Wagner was one of the earliest Western artists to use concepts from the Dharmic religions in their work.

Tristan und Isolde is widely acknowledged as one of the greatest achievements of Western art music, intriguing audiences with philosophical depths not usually associated with opera, and the "terrible and sweet infinity" of its musical-poetic language. Its advanced harmony, immediately announced by the Tristan chord of its prelude, marks a defining moment in the evolution of music, characterized by unprecedented use of chromaticism, tonal ambiguity, orchestral colour, and prolonged harmonic suspension. These innovations initially divided audiences, but the opera grew in popularity and became enormously influential among Western classical composers, directly inspiring Anton Bruckner, Gustav Mahler, Richard Strauss, Alban Berg, Arnold Schoenberg, and Benjamin Britten. Composers such as Claude Debussy, Maurice Ravel, and Igor Stravinsky formulated their styles in contrast to Wagner's musical legacy.

== Composition history ==
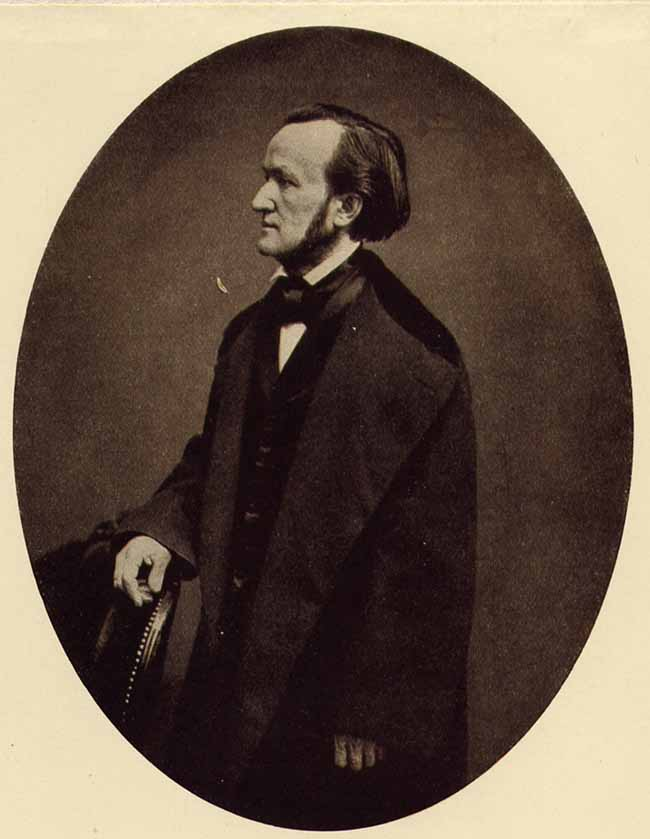
Photo of Wagner in Brussels, 1860

Wagner was forced to abandon his position as conductor of the Dresden Opera in 1849, as there was a warrant for his arrest for his participation in the unsuccessful May Revolution. He left his wife, Minna, in Dresden, and fled to Zurich. There, in 1852, he met the wealthy silk trader Otto Wesendonck. Wesendonck became a supporter of Wagner and bankrolled him for several years. Wesendonck's wife, Mathilde, became enamoured of Wagner. Though Wagner was working on his epic Der Ring des Nibelungen, he found himself intrigued by the legend of Tristan and Isolde.

The rediscovery of medieval Germanic poetry, including Gottfried von Strassburg's version of Tristan, the Nibelungenlied, and Wolfram von Eschenbach's Parzival, left a large impact on the German Romantic movements of the mid-19th century. The story of Tristan and Isolde is a quintessential romance of the Middle Ages and the Renaissance. Several versions of it exist, the earliest dating to the middle of the 12th century. Gottfried's version, part of the "courtly" branch of the legend, greatly influenced German literature.

According to his autobiography, Mein Leben, Wagner decided to dramatise the Tristan legend after his friend Karl Ritter attempted to do so:

He had, in fact, made a point of giving prominence to the lighter phases of the romance, whereas it was its all-pervading tragedy that impressed me so deeply that I felt convinced it should stand out in bold relief, regardless of minor details.

This influence, together with his discovery of Arthur Schopenhauer's philosophy in October 1854, led Wagner to find himself in a "serious mood created by Schopenhauer, which was trying to find ecstatic expression. It was some such mood that inspired the conception of a Tristan und Isolde."

Wagner wrote of his preoccupations with Schopenhauer and Tristan in a 16 December 1854 letter to Franz Liszt:

Never in my life having enjoyed the true happiness of love I shall erect a memorial to this loveliest of all dreams in which, from the first to the last, love shall, for once, find utter repletion. I have devised in my mind a Tristan und Isolde, the simplest, yet most full-blooded musical conception imaginable, and with the 'black flag' that waves at the end I shall cover myself over – to die.

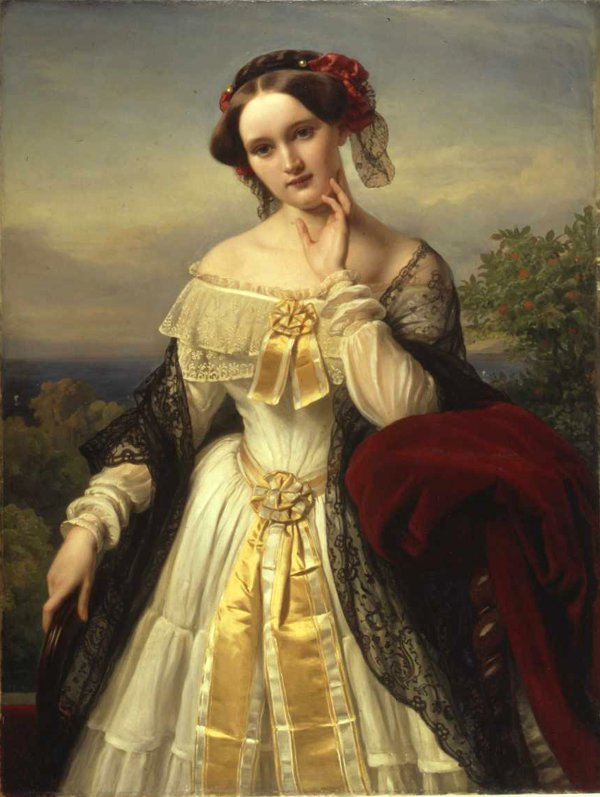
Painting of Mathilde Wesendonck (1850) by Karl Ferdinand Sohn

By the end of 1854, Wagner had sketched out all three acts of the opera, based on Gottfried von Strassburg's version of the story. The earliest extant sketches are from December 1856, but only in August 1857 did Wagner begin devoting his attention entirely to the opera, putting Siegfried aside to do so. On 20 August he began the prose sketch for the opera, and the libretto (or poem, as Wagner preferred to call it) was completed by 18 September. Wagner had moved into a cottage built in the grounds of Wesendonck's villa, where, during his work on Tristan und Isolde, he became passionately involved with Mathilde Wesendonck. Whether this relationship was platonic is uncertain. One evening in September that year, Wagner read the finished poem of Tristan to an audience including Mathilde; his wife, Minna; and his future wife Cosima von Bülow.

By October 1857, Wagner had begun the composition sketch of the first act. In November, he set five of Mathilde's poems to music known today as the Wesendonck Lieder. This was unusual for Wagner, who almost never set to music poetic texts other than his own. Wagner called two of the songs – "Im Treibhaus" and "Träume" – "Studies for Tristan und Isolde": "Träume" uses a motif that forms the love duet in act 2 of Tristan, while "Im Treibhaus" introduces a theme that later became the prelude to act 3. But Wagner resolved to write Tristan only after he had secured a publishing deal with the Leipzig-based firm Breitkopf & Härtel, in January 1858. From then on, Wagner finished each act and sent it off for engraving before he started on the next – a remarkable feat given the score's unprecedented length and complexity.

In April 1858, Minna intercepted a note from Wagner to Mathilde and, despite Wagner's protests that she was giving it a "vulgar interpretation", accused first Wagner and then Mathilde of infidelity. After enduring much misery, Wagner persuaded Minna, who had a heart condition, to rest at a spa while Otto Wesendonck took Mathilde to Italy. During the two women's absence, Wagner began the composition sketch of the second act of Tristan. Minna's return in July 1858 did not clear the air, and on 17 August Wagner was forced to leave both Minna and Mathilde and move to Venice.

Wagner later called his last days in Zurich "a veritable Hell". Minna wrote to Mathilde before departing for Dresden:

I must tell you with a bleeding heart that you have succeeded in separating my husband from me after nearly twenty-two years of marriage. May this noble deed contribute to your peace of mind, to your happiness.

Wagner finished the second act of Tristan during his eight-month exile in Venice, where he lived in the Palazzo Giustinian. In March 1859, fearing extradition to Saxony, where he was still considered a fugitive, Wagner moved to Lucerne, where he wrote the last act, completing it in August 1859.

=== Premiere ===
Tristan und Isolde proved to be a difficult opera to stage, and Wagner considered various possibilities for the venue. In 1857 he was invited by a representative of Pedro II, Emperor of Brazil, to stage his operas in Rio de Janeiro (in Italian, the language of the Imperial Opera); he told Liszt he was considering settling in Rio, and that that city would be given the honour of premiering Tristan. Wagner sent the emperor bound copies of his earlier operas in expression of his interest, but nothing more came of the plan. He then proposed that the premiere take place in Strasbourg, following interest in the project shown by the Grand Duchess of Baden. Again, the project failed to eventuate. His thoughts then turned to Paris, the centre of the operatic world in the middle of the 19th century. However, after a disastrous staging of Tannhäuser at the Paris Opéra, Wagner offered the work to the Karlsruhe opera in 1861.

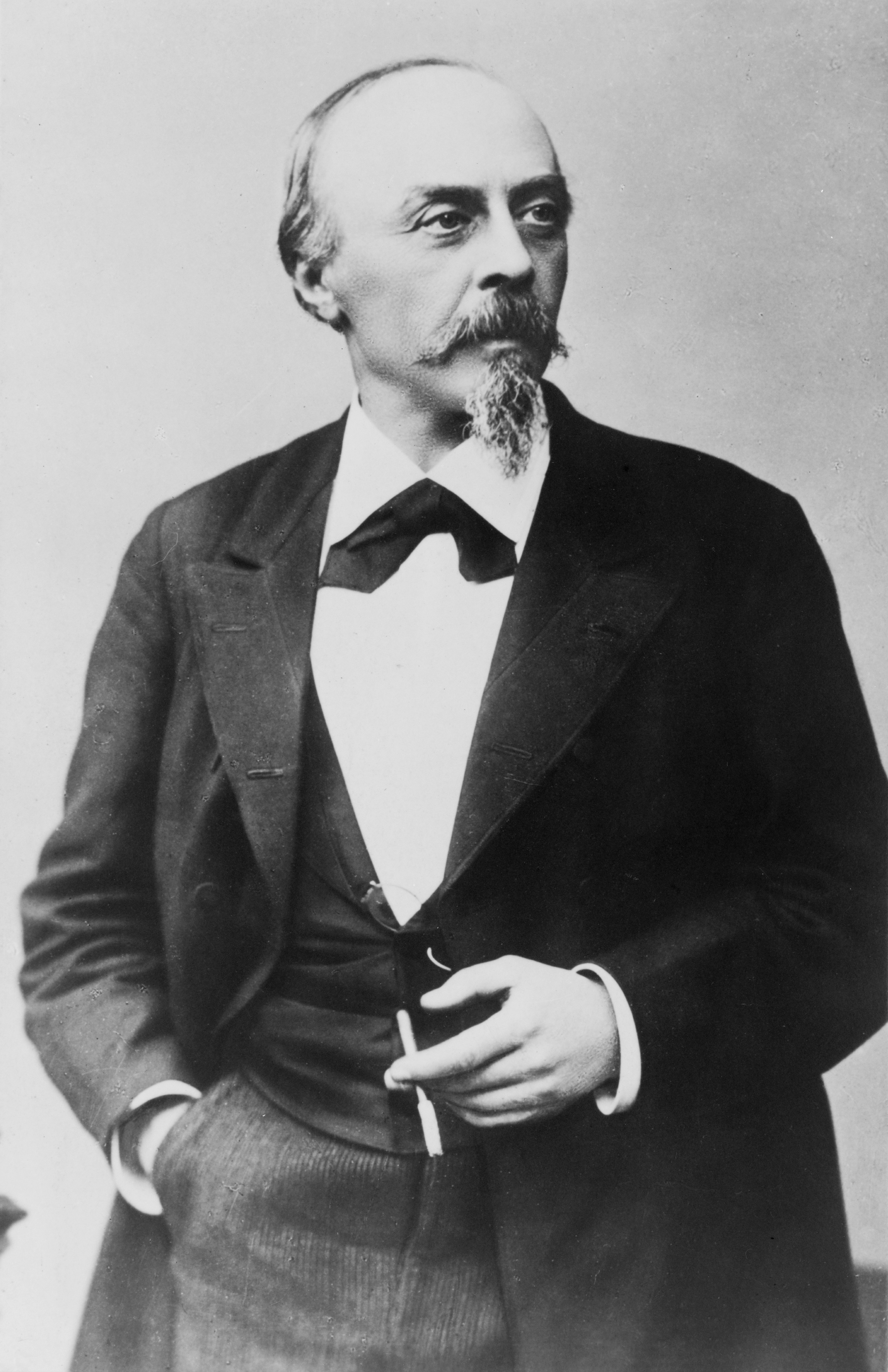
Photo of Hans von Bülow, who conducted the premiere

To rehearse possible singers for Karlsruhe, Wagner visited the Vienna Court Opera, which proposed staging the opera. Tenor Alois Ander, cast as Tristan, proved unable to master the role. Dresden, Weimar and Prague stagings also failed. After 70-plus rehearsals between 1862 and 1864, the Vienna production was abandoned, securing Tristan's unperformable reputation.

Only after King Ludwig II of Bavaria became a sponsor of Wagner (granting him a generous stipend and supporting his artistic endeavours in other ways) could enough resources be found to mount the premiere of Tristan und Isolde. Hans von Bülow was chosen to conduct the production at the Nationaltheater in Munich, even though Wagner was having an affair with his wife, Cosima von Bülow. The planned premiere on 15 May 1865 had to be postponed until the Isolde, Malvina Schnorr von Carolsfeld, had recovered from hoarseness. The work finally premiered on 10 June 1865, with Malvina's husband Ludwig partnering her as Tristan.

On 21 July 1865, having sung the role only four times, Ludwig died suddenly – prompting speculation that the exertion involved in singing the part of Tristan had killed him. (The stress of performing Tristan also claimed the lives of conductors Felix Mottl in 1911 and Joseph Keilberth in 1968. Both died after collapsing while conducting the second act.) Malvina sank into a deep depression after her husband's death and never sang again, although she lived for another 38 years.

For some years thereafter, the roles' only performers were another husband–wife team, Heinrich Vogl and Therese Vogl.

== Performance history ==
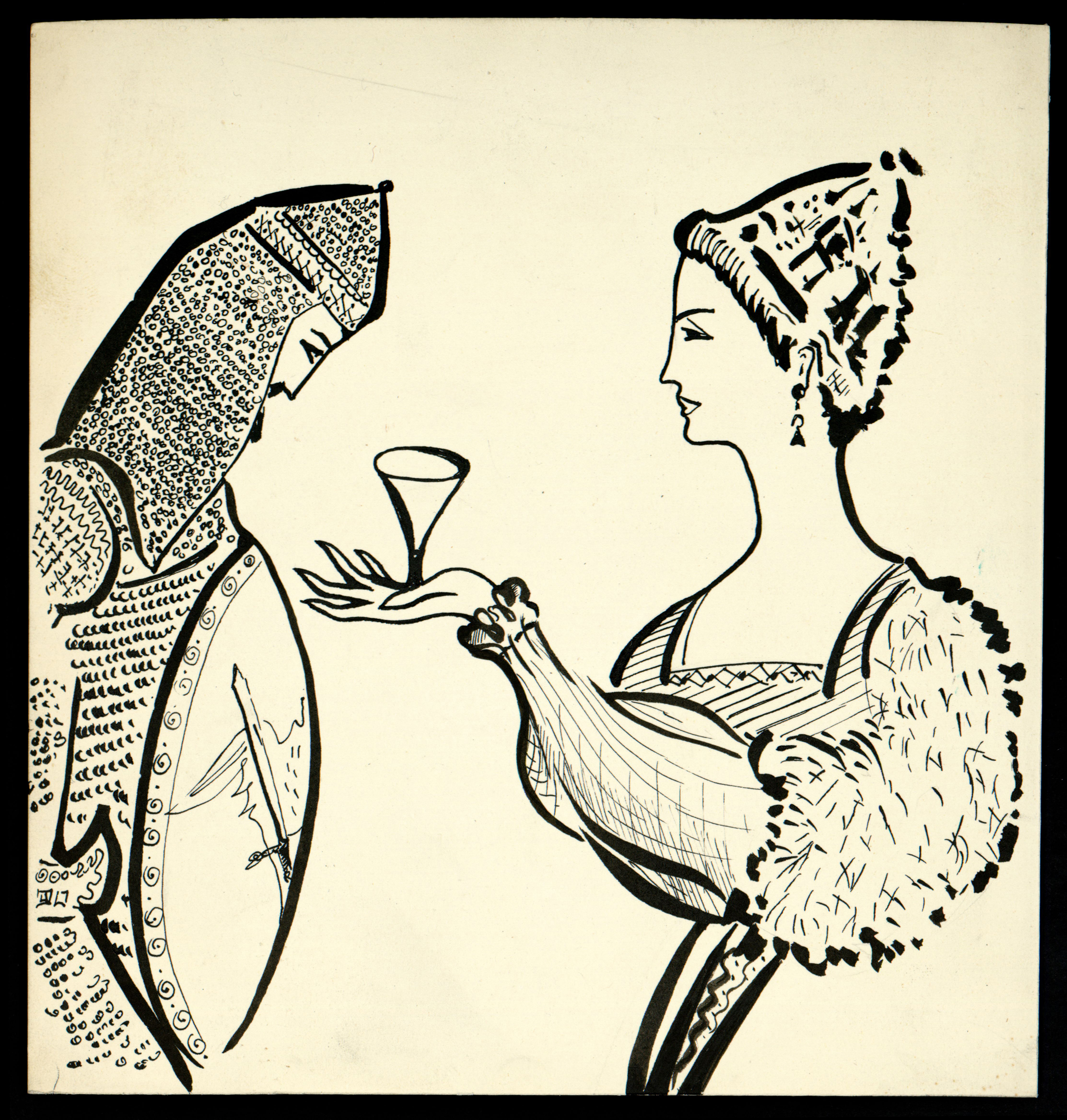
Drawing for a libretto (undated)

The next production of Tristan was in Weimar in 1874. Wagner supervised another production in Berlin in March 1876, but the opera was performed in his own theatre at the Bayreuth Festival only after his death; Cosima Wagner oversaw that widely acclaimed production in 1886.

The first production outside Germany was at the Theatre Royal, Drury Lane, London in 1882; Tristan was performed by Hermann Winkelmann, who later that year sang the title role of Parsifal at Bayreuth. It was conducted by Hans Richter, who also conducted the first Covent Garden production two years later. Winkelmann was also the first Vienna Tristan, in 1883. The first American performance was held at the Metropolitan Opera on 1 December 1886, with Albert Niemann and Lilli Lehmann conducted by Anton Seidl.

The first performance in France was at the Nouveau-Théâtre in Paris in 1899 in translation, with Félia Litvinne and Gilbert under Charles Lamoureux; it was then staged at the Opéra in 1904 with Louise Grandjean and Albert Alvarez and Paul Taffanel conducting, and in 1925 entered the repertoire of the Opéra-Comique with Suzanne Balguerie and Oscar Ralf conducted by Désiré-Émile Inghelbrecht.

In 1968 Belgian television presented Tristan und Isolde as a ten-part television serial, filmed in various outdoor locations. The cast included Claude Heater as Tristan, Jacqueline Van Quaille as Isolde, Maryse Patris as Brangaene, and Marke sung by Josef Greindl but acted by Maurice de Groote; the conductor was André Vandernoot. Before each part, Vandernoot gave a commentary on the opera.

== Significance in the development of Western music ==
Harold C. Schonberg wrote: "The opening chords of Tristan were to the last half of the nineteenth century what [Beethoven's] Eroica and Ninth Symphonies had been to the first half—a breakaway, a new concept. … In Tristan, harmonic relations are pushed to their breaking point, and twentieth century scholars see in the opera the beginnings of atonality." Wagner uses a remarkable range of orchestral colour, harmony, and polyphony, with a freedom rarely found in his earlier operas. The first chord in the piece, the Tristan chord, is of great significance in the move away from traditional tonal harmony, as it resolves to another dissonant chord:

The opera is noted for its numerous expansions of harmonic practice; one significant innovation is the frequent use of two consecutive chords containing tritones (diminished fifth or augmented fourth), neither of which is a diminished seventh chord (F–B, bar 2; E–A♯, bar 3). Tristan und Isolde is also notable for its use of harmonic suspension – a device to create musical tension through a series of prolonged unfinished cadences inspiring desire and expectation for musical resolution. Suspension is a common compositional device (in use since before the Renaissance), but Wagner was one of the first composers to employ harmonic suspension over the course of an entire work. The cadences first introduced in the prelude are not resolved until the finale of act 3, and, on a number of occasions, Wagner primes the audience for a musical climax with a series of chords building in tension, only to defer the anticipated resolution. One example of this is at the end of the love duet in act 2 ("Wie sie fassen, wie sie lassen..."), where Tristan and Isolde gradually build up to a musical climax only to have the expected resolution interrupted by Kurwenal ("Rette Dich, Tristan!"). Full resolution does not occur until the very end, after Isolde sings the passage commonly called the "Liebestod" ("Love-Death"), after which she sinks down, "as if transfigured", dead onto Tristan's body.

Claude Debussy was deeply influenced by Wagner, particularly Tristan. Moments of Tristan-inspired tonality mark his early compositions, like the Prélude à l'après-midi d'un faune (1894). However, he later distanced himself from Wagner. Many consider his opera Pelléas et Mélisande (1902) a French counterpoint to Tristan. Aaron Copland wrote that Arnold Schoenberg's Verklärte Nacht (1899) is "clearly inspired by Tristan", "moving into a realm where the normal rule of harmony – dissonance begetting consonance in an orderly progression – were no longer the only formula for creating music." Alban Berg tipped his hat to Tristan in his Lyric Suite and his opera Lulu (1929-1937). Wagner's chromaticism influenced the development of film music.

== Roles ==
Roles, voice types, premiere cast
Role	Voice type	Premiere cast, 10 June 1865 Conductor: Hans von Bülow
Tristan, a Breton nobleman, adopted heir of Marke	tenor	Ludwig Schnorr von Carolsfeld
Isolde, an Irish princess betrothed to Marke	high dramatic soprano	Malvina Schnorr von Carolsfeld
Brangäne, Isolde's maid	soprano	Anna Deinet
Kurwenal, Tristan's servant	baritone	Anton Mitterwurzer
Marke, King of Cornwall	bass	Ludwig Zottmayr
Melot, a courtier, Tristan's friend	tenor (or baritone)	Karl Samuel Heinrich
A shepherd	tenor	Karl Simons
A steersman	baritone	Peter Hartmann
A young sailor	tenor	
Sailors, knights, and esquires

== Instrumentation ==
Tristan und Isolde is scored for the following instruments:

- 3 flutes (one doubles piccolo), 2 oboes, cor anglais, 2 clarinets, bass clarinet, 3 bassoons
- 4 horns, 3 trumpets, 3 trombones, bass tuba
- timpani, cymbals, triangle
- harp
- 1st and 2nd violins, violas, violoncellos, and double basses (Wagner's original score describes the strings as "Vorzüglich gut und stark zu besetzen." ("The string instruments are to be exquisitely cast in quantity and quality").

onstage

- cor anglais, 6 horns, 3 trumpets, 3 trombones

== Synopsis ==
Prelude

=== Act 1 ===
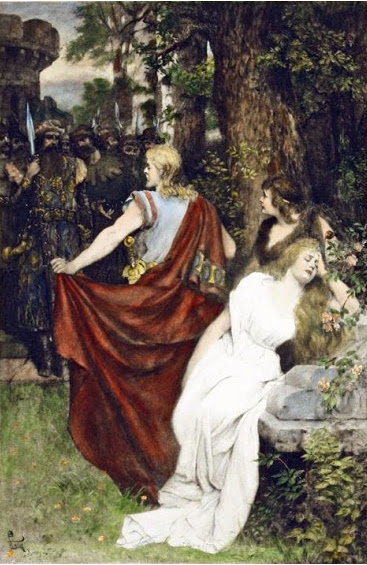
Tristan und Isolde by Ferdinand Leeke

Isolde, promised to King Marke in marriage, and her handmaid, Brangäne, are quartered aboard Marke's nephew Tristan's ship, being transported to Marke's lands in Cornwall. A young sailor sings of a "wild Irish maid" ("Westwärts schweift der Blick"), which Isolde construes as a mocking reference to herself. In a furious outburst, she wishes the seas to rise up and sink the ship, killing herself and all on board ("Erwache mir wieder, kühne Gewalt"). Her scorn and rage are directed particularly at Tristan, the knight responsible for taking her to Marke, and Isolde sends Brangäne to command Tristan to appear before her ("Befehlen liess' dem Eigenholde"). Tristan refuses the request, claiming that his place is at the helm. His henchman, Kurwenal, answers more brusquely, saying that Isolde is in no position to command Tristan and reminding Brangäne that Isolde's fiancé, Morold, was killed by Tristan ("Herr Morold zog zu Meere her").

Brangäne returns to Isolde to relate these events, and Isolde, in what is termed the "narrative and curse", sadly tells her of how, after Morold died, she happened upon a stranger who called himself Tantris. Tantris was found mortally wounded in a barge ("von einem Kahn, der klein und arm") and Isolde used her healing powers to restore him to health. But she discovered during Tantris's recovery that he was actually Tristan, Morold's murderer. Isolde attempted to kill Tristan with his own sword as he lay helpless before her, but he looked not at the sword or her hand but into her eyes ("Er sah' mir in die Augen"). His gaze pierced her heart and she was unable to slay him. Tristan was allowed to leave on the condition that he never return, but he came back with the intention to make Isolde King Marke's bride. Furious at Tristan's betrayal, Isolde insists that he drink atonement to her, and from her medicine chest produces a vial to make the drink. Brangäne is shocked to see that it is a lethal poison.

Kurwenal appears in the women's quarters ("Auf auf! Ihr Frauen!") and announces that the voyage is coming to an end. Isolde warns Kurwenal that she will not appear before Marke if Tristan does not come before her as she previously asked and drink atonement to her. When Tristan arrives, Isolde reproaches him for his conduct and tells him that he owes her his life and that his actions have undermined her honour, since she blessed Morold's weapons before battle and therefore swore revenge. Tristan first offers his sword but Isolde refuses, saying they must drink atonement. Brangäne brings in the potion that will seal their pardon; Tristan knows it may kill him, since he knows Isolde's magic powers ("Wohl kenn' ich Irlands Königin"). With the journey almost at its end, Tristan drinks and Isolde takes half the potion for herself. Instead of death, the potion brings relentless love ("Tristan!" "Isolde!"). Kurwenal, who announces King Marke's imminent arrival aboard, interrupts their rapture. Isolde asks Brangäne which potion she prepared and Brangäne replies, as the sailors hail Marke's arrival, that it was not poison; rather, she substituted a love potion to save Isolde and Tristan.

=== Act 2 ===
King Marke leads a hunting party out into the night, leaving Isolde and Brangäne alone in the castle. A torch is burning at the open door of Isolde's apartments. Listening to the hunting horns, Isolde believes the hunting party is far enough away to warrant extinguishing the torch – the prearranged signal for Tristan to join her ("Nicht Hörnerschall tönt so hold"). Brangäne warns Isolde that Melot, one of Marke's knights, has seen the amorous looks Tristan and Isolde have exchanged and suspects their passion ("Ein Einz'ger war's, ich achtet' es wohl"). But Isolde believes Melot to be Tristan's most loyal friend and, in a frenzy of desire, extinguishes the flame. Brangäne retires to the ramparts to keep watch as Tristan arrives.

The lovers, at last alone and freed from the constraints of courtly life, declare their passion for each other. Tristan decries the realm of daylight as false and unreal, keeping them apart. Only at night, he claims, can they truly be together, and only in the long night of death can they be eternally united ("O sink' hernieder, Nacht der Liebe"). During their tryst, Brangäne repeatedly warns that the night is ending ("Einsam wachend in der Nacht"), but her cries fall upon deaf ears. The day breaks in on the lovers as Melot leads Marke and his men to find Tristan and Isolde in each other's arms. Marke is heartbroken, not only because of Tristan's betrayal but because Melot betrayed Tristan to Marke ("Mir – dies? Dies, Tristan – mir?").

Tristan says he cannot tell Marke why he betrayed him because Marke wouldn't understand. He turns to Isolde, who agrees to accompany him into the realm of night. Tristan further reveals that Melot has also fallen in love with Isolde. A fight ensues between Melot and Tristan, but at a critical moment, Tristan deliberately throws his sword aside, allowing Melot to stab him.

=== Act 3 ===
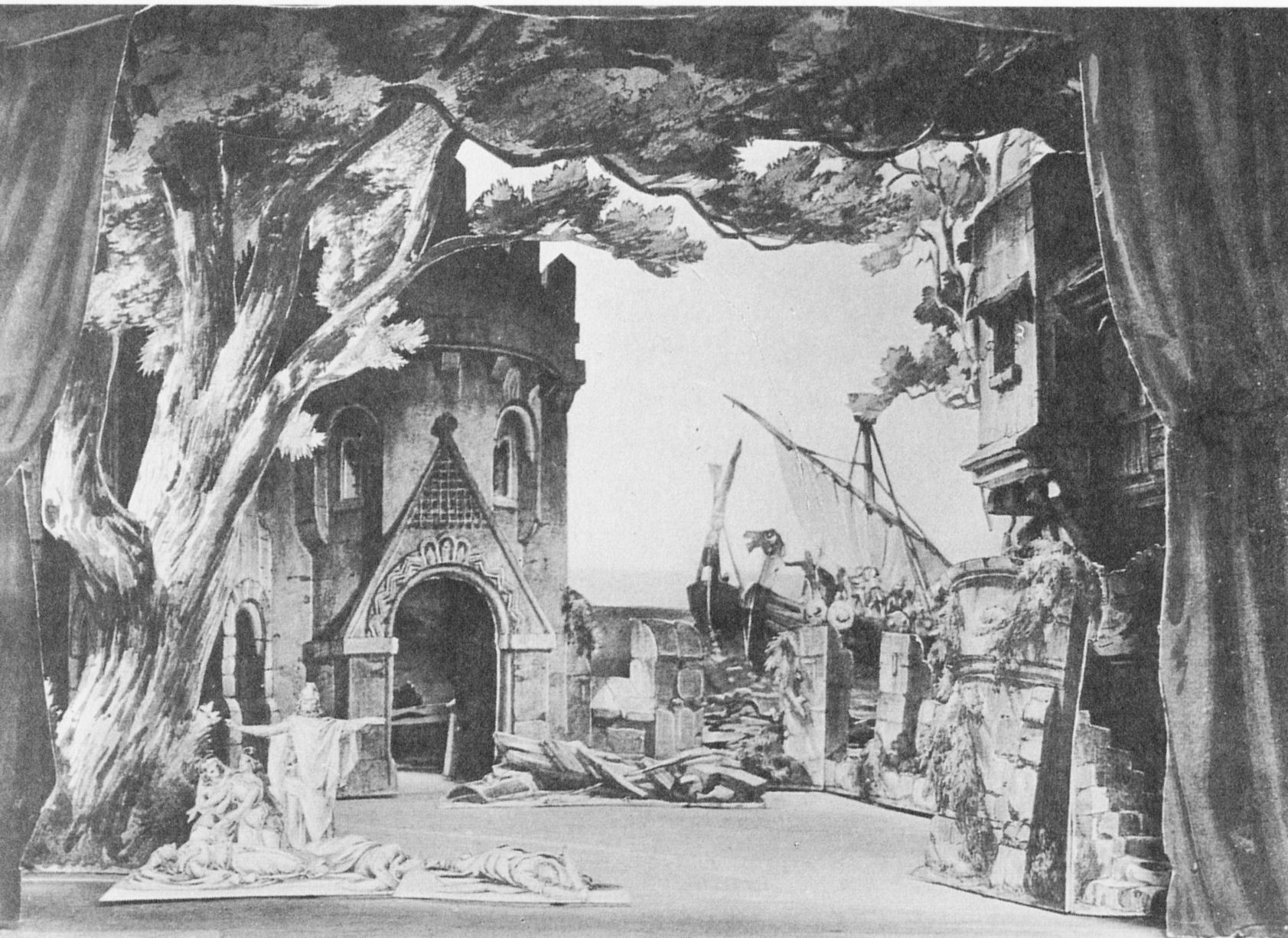
Model by Angelo Quaglio of the set in act 3 for the premiere production

Kurwenal has brought Tristan home to his castle at Kareol in Brittany. A shepherd pipes a mournful tune and asks whether Tristan is awake. Kurwenal replies that only Isolde's arrival can save Tristan, and the shepherd offers to keep watch and says he will pipe a joyful tune to mark the arrival of any ship. Tristan awakes ("Die alte Weise – was weckt sie mich?") and laments his fate – to be, once again, in the false realm of daylight, once more driven by unceasing unquenchable yearning ("Wo ich erwacht' weilt ich nicht"). Tristan's sorrow ends when Kurwenal tells him that Isolde is on her way. Overjoyed, Tristan asks whether her ship is in sight, but only a sorrowful tune from the shepherd's pipe is heard.

Tristan relapses and recalls that the shepherd's mournful tune is the one played when he was told of the deaths of his father and mother ("Muss ich dich so versteh'n, du alte, ernst Weise"). He rails once again against his desires and the love potion ("verflucht sei, furchtbarer Trank!") until, exhausted, he collapses in delirium. The shepherd is heard piping the arrival of Isolde's ship, and, as Kurwenal rushes to meet her, Tristan tears the bandages from his wounds in his excitement ("Hahei! Mein Blut, lustig nun fliesse!"). As Isolde arrives at his side, Tristan dies with her name on his lips.

Isolde collapses beside her deceased lover just as the appearance of another ship is announced. Kurwenal sees Melot, Marke, and Brangäne arriving ("Tod und Hölle! Alles zur Hand!") and believes they have come to kill Tristan. In an attempt to avenge him, he furiously attacks Melot. Marke tries to stop the fight to no avail. Both Melot and Kurwenal are killed in the fight. Marke and Brangäne finally reach Tristan and Isolde. Grieving over the body of his "truest friend" ("Tot denn alles!"), Marke explains that Brangäne told him about the love potion and that he has come not to part the lovers, but to unite them ("Warum Isolde, warum mir das?"). Isolde appears to wake at this and, in a final aria describing her vision of Tristan risen again (the "Liebestod", "love death"), dies ("Mild und leise wie er lächelt").

== Influences ==
=== Schopenhauer ===
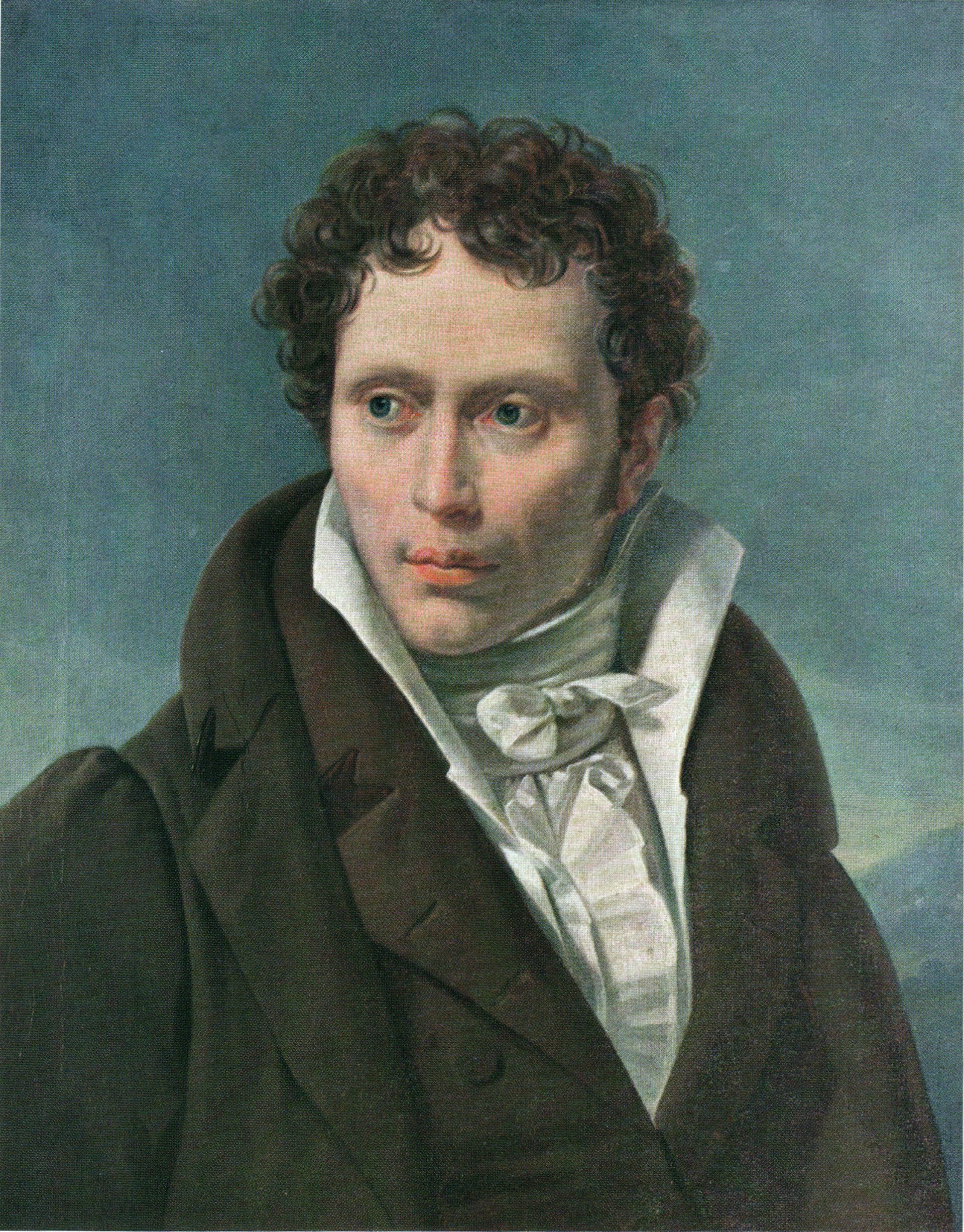
Portrait of Arthur Schopenhauer (1815) by Ludwig Sigismund Ruhl

Wagner read Schopenhauer's The World as Will and Representation in 1854, and it profoundly affected him, triggering a spiritual and artistic reassessment. Schopenhauer's pessimistic worldview, his emphasis on the primacy of "Will" as the fundamental force of existence, and his view that music is the highest art because it directly expresses the Will resonated deeply with Wagner. In response, Wagner composed works such as Tristan und Isolde and Parsifal, whose libretti are pervaded with Schopenhauer's ideas and whose music dominates the works. This is in contrast to Wagner's earlier theorizing in The Artwork of the Future (1849) that music, poetry, and drama should be balanced and serve as equal partners in the Gesamtkunstwerk.

Wagner gives heightened importance to music in Tristan und Isolde, often regarded as his most symphonically rich work. Unlike with his other operas, Wagner wrote some music for Tristan before completing the libretto. The music embodies Schopenhauer's concept of the Will, a force that is inherently restless and never fully satisfied, driving all human urges and desires and leading to a cycle of longing and suffering. Wagner captures this in the opera's music through unresolved harmonic tension and extreme chromaticism, creating a sense of perpetual yearning and lack of resolution. Only at the very end, when Isolde undergoes transfiguration and "Love-Death", does the musical tension finally resolve. The music is often called "sensual" and "erotic"; this not only reflects the illicit lovers' desire but is consistent with Schopenhauer's position that the sexual urge is the Will's most powerful manifestation.

In the second act, Wagner uses day and night as metaphors for the realms Tristan and Isolde inhabit. Day represents the external world of social obligations, duties, and constraints—embodied by King Marke's court, where Tristan and Isolde must suppress their love and live according to the norms and expectations of society. It is a world of falsehood and deception because it requires them to deny their true feelings. Night, by contrast, represents the inner world of truth, love, and authentic existence, where Tristan and Isolde can express their love freely and fully. It is a realm where the external world's constraints are suspended and their deepest desires can be realized. But this realm is also linked to death, as true fulfillment and unity can be achieved only beyond the physical world.

Schopenhauer's philosophy distinguishes phenomenon—the world of appearances, shaped by our perceptions and intellect—and noumenon, the underlying reality not directly accessible to us. Wagner implicitly equates Day with Phenomenon and Night with noumenon.

=== Mysticism and spirituality ===
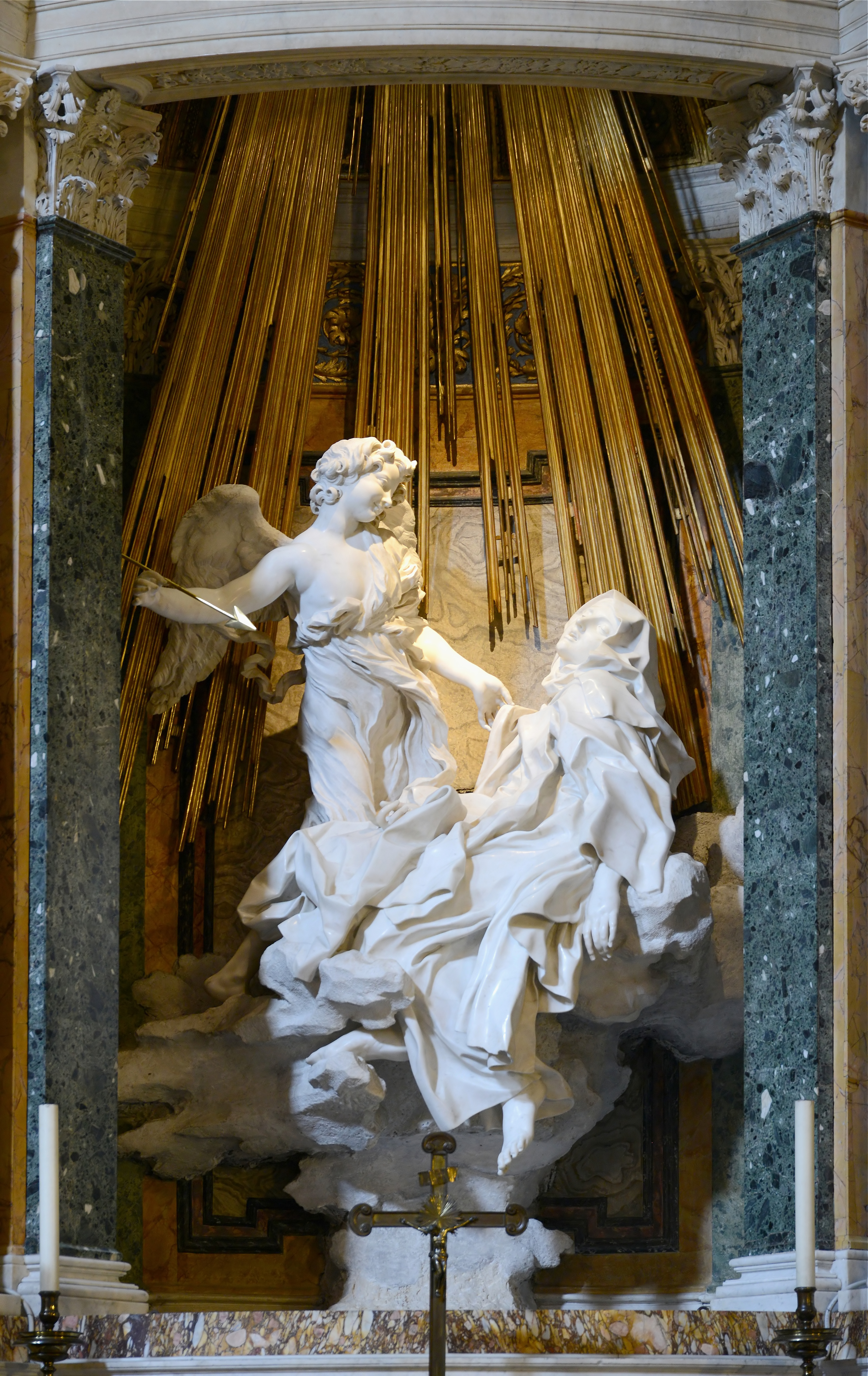
Ecstasy of Saint Teresa (1652) by Gian Lorenzo Bernini. Like Bernini's sculpture, the mysticism of Wagner's operas like Tristan drew criticism for an "emotionalism of a colour at once erotic and religiously enthusiastic".

In the years leading up to 1857, when Wagner set The Ring aside to focus on Tristan und Isolde, spiritual matters dominated his interests. In 1855, his attention turned to Indian religion, and he read Eugène Burnouf's Introduction to the History of Indian Buddhism and Hindu texts published in Adolf Holtzmann's Indian Sagas. In addition to Tristan, this culminated in the conception of two additional operas at this time, Die Sieger, based on the life of the Buddhist monk Ānanda, and Parsifal, a Holy Grail quest based on Wolfram von Eschenbach's medieval poem Parzival.

Wagner was interested in the Orient and already acquainted with Islamic mysticism before he read Schopenhauer, calling the Persian Sufi poet Hafez the "greatest of all poets" in an 1852 letter to his friend August Röckel. Schopenhauer's discussion of German Christian mystics, such as Meister Eckhart, further piqued Wagner's interest in mysticism.

When Tristan and Isolde drink the potion at the end of act 1 but do not die, their eyes are opened to the illusions of material Day and to the higher spiritual insight of Night. Tristan celebrates the enlightenment brought about by the potion in act 2:

Oh hail the potion! Hail to the draft!
Hail to its magic's magnificent craft!
Through the gates of Death, to me it flowed,
wide and open, for me it showed,
that which I've only dreamed to have sight,
the wondrous realm of Night!

Mythologist Joseph Campbell wrote of this moment:

...as [Tristan and Isolde] have already renounced psychologically both love as lust and the fear of death, when they drink, and live, and again look upon each other, the veil of māyā has fallen.

In Indian religions, māyā is appearance, a "magic show, an illusion where things appear to be present but are not what they seem" that "conceals the true character of spiritual reality"; Schopenhauer's "phenomenon" parallels it. Tristan denounces the lying "disguise" of Day and resolves to yearn for and seek out only the "Holy Night":

Oh, now we are with Night anointed!
The treacherous Day, with envy pointed,
could part us with its disguise,
but no longer cheat us with lies!
Amid the Day's deluded churning,
remains one single yearning—
the yearning for the Holy Night,
where all-eternal's solely true
Love does laugh with delight!

After this, the act 2 love duet, the "Liebesnacht" ("O sink hernieder, Nacht der Liebe"), begins. In it, Tristan and Isolde dedicate themselves to eternal Night and wish that Day never come again, instead yearning to die a transcendental "Love-Death" as the ultimate consummation of their love. The music builds to ecstatic, mystically elated climaxes, where they imagine the dissolution of their individual egos and unity with each other and "supreme love":

Tristan you, I Isolde, no longer Tristan!
You Isolde, Tristan I, no longer Isolde!
Without naming, without separating,
newly perceiving, newly igniting;
endless, eternal, one-consciousness:
a heart fervently burning with supreme love's joy!

These themes of spiritual yearning resonate with the introspective and passionate elements of Christian mysticism, particularly the concept of "unio mystica"—the soul's union with the divine. The characters' relentless pursuit of an idealized love that transcends earthly bounds and the notion of love leading to a metaphysical union can be seen as parallel to the Sufi pursuit of "fana", the annihilation of the self in the universal presence of the divine.

The closing "Liebestod", Isolde's "transfiguration" sung before she dies, invokes Hindu and Buddhist sentiments. The German word for breath, Atem, is related etymologically to the Sanskrit word Ātman, meaning soul or eternal self. Isolde sinking "unconscious" into a state of bliss is associated with the Buddhist concept of Nirvana, although Schopenhauer and Wagner at the time misunderstood this concept to imply a state of non-being:

In the unbounded swell,
in the resounding call,
in the world's breath, flowing in all!
To drown...
to sink...
unconscious...
supreme bliss!

Wagner scholar John Pohanka has written that not only do Wagner's libretti exhibit spiritual influences, but his music and drama invoke transformative, ineffable experiences in some listeners comparable to mystical experiences.

Given Schopenhauer's influence and the apparent framing of Tristan und Isolde as a tragedy, many have remarked on its "pessimism". Of this, British scholar George Ainslie Hight wrote in 1912:

Such is Wagner's pessimism: it is the pessimism of the Vedânta philosophy; that is to say, it is most clearly formulated in that system, and in the Upanishads upon which it rests, but really it is the common basis of all religions. It breathes in the poems of Hafiz, in the philosophy of Parmenides, Plato, and the Stoics, in the profound wisdom of Ecclesiastes, in mediaeval mysticism, and the faith of the early Christian Church. Buddhism and Christianity are both pessimist in their origin.

== Reactions ==
Tristan und Isolde is now considered a classic, but critical opinion of it was initially unfavourable. The 5 July 1865 edition of the Allgemeine musikalische Zeitung reported:

Not to mince words, it is the glorification of sensual pleasure, tricked out with every titillating device, it is unremitting materialism, according to which human beings have no higher destiny than, after living the life of turtle doves, 'to vanish in sweet odours, like a breath'. In the service of this end, music has been enslaved to the word; the most ideal of the Muses has been made to grind the colours for indecent paintings... [Wagner] makes sensuality itself the true subject of his drama.... We think that the stage presentation of the poem Tristan und Isolde amounts to an act of indecency. Wagner does not show us the life of heroes of Nordic sagas, which would edify and strengthen the spirit of his German audiences. What he does present is the ruination of the life of heroes through sensuality.

In 1868, Eduard Hanslick wrote of the Tristan prelude that it "reminds one of the old Italian painting of a martyr [Erasmus of Formia] whose intestines are slowly unwound from his body on a reel". In 1882, the first performance in London's Drury Lane Theatre drew the following response from The Era:

We cannot refrain from making a protest against the worship of animal passion which is so striking a feature in the late works of Wagner. We grant there is nothing so repulsive in Tristan as in Die Walküre, but the system is the same. The passion is unholy in itself and its representation is impure, and for those reasons we rejoice in believing that such works will not become popular. If they did we are certain their tendency would be mischievous, and there is, therefore, some cause for congratulation in the fact that Wagner's music, in spite of all its wondrous skill and power, repels a greater number than it fascinates.

On a visit to Germany, Mark Twain heard Tristan at Bayreuth and said: "I know of some, and have heard of many, who could not sleep after it, but cried the night away. I feel strongly out of place here. Sometimes I feel like the one sane person in the community of the mad; sometimes I feel like the one blind man where all others see; the one groping savage in the college of the learned, and always, during service, I feel like a heretic in heaven."

Clara Schumann wrote that Tristan was "the most repugnant thing I have ever seen or heard in all my life".

Tristan's stature has since improved. In an interview shortly before his death, Giuseppe Verdi said he "stood in wonder and terror" before Tristan. In The Perfect Wagnerite, George Bernard Shaw wrote that Tristan is "an astonishingly intense and faithful translation into music of the emotions which accompany the union of a pair of lovers" and called it "a poem of destruction and death". Initially dismissive of Tristan, Richard Strauss said that Wagner's music "would kill a cat and would turn rocks into scrambled eggs from fear of [its] hideous discords". But Strauss later became part of the Bayreuth coterie and in 1892 wrote to Cosima Wagner: "I have conducted my first Tristan. It was the most wonderful day of my life." In 1935 he wrote to Joseph Gregor, one of his librettists, that Tristan was "the end of all romanticism, as it brings into focus the longing of the entire 19th century."

Vincent d'Indy wrote that Emmanuel Chabrier wept upon hearing the opening: "I've been waiting for ten years of my life for that A on the 'cellos". Debussy parodied the opening in his ragtime-infused piano piece "Golliwog's Cakewalk" (1911), instructing the passage be played 'avec une grande emotion'. Maurice Ravel parodied the Love Duet in the Duo miaulé in his opera L'enfant et les sortilèges: Fantaisie lyrique en deux parties (1925), sung by two cats.

The conductor Bruno Walter heard his first Tristan in 1889 as a student:

So there I sat in the topmost gallery of the Berlin Opera House, and from the first sound of the cellos my heart contracted spasmodically.... Never before has my soul been deluged with such floods of sound and passion, never had my heart been consumed by such yearning and sublime bliss... A new epoch had begun: Wagner was my god, and I wanted to become his prophet.

Arnold Schoenberg called Wagner's shifting harmonies in Tristan "phenomena of incredible adaptability and nonindependence roaming, homeless, among the spheres of keys; spies reconnoitering weaknesses; to exploit them in order to create confusion, deserters for whom surrender of their own personality is an end in itself". Harold C. Schonberg compared Tristan to Schoenberg's Erwartung (1924): "Tristan und Isolde is full of night and day symbolism, and so is Erwartung. Tristan und Isolde ends with a 'love-death,' and so does Erwartung. When the woman finds her dead lover in the Schoenberg opera, she sings a long passage that in effect is nothing less than a 'Liebestod.' Through Schoenberg's new language something very traditional can be felt."

Friedrich Nietzsche, who in his younger years was one of Wagner's staunchest allies, wrote that, for him, "Tristan is the real opus metaphysicum of all art ... insatiable and sweet craving for the secrets of night and death ... it is overpowering in its simple grandeur". In an 1868 letter to his friend Erwin Rohde, Nietzsche described his reaction to Tristan's prelude: "I simply cannot bring myself to remain critically aloof from this music; every nerve in me is atwitch, and it has been a long time since I had such a lasting sense of ecstasy as with this overture". Even after his break with Wagner, Nietzsche considered Tristan a masterpiece: "Even now I am still in search of a work that exercises such a dangerous fascination, such a spine-tingling and blissful infinity as Tristan – I have sought in vain, in every art."

T. S. Eliot quotes Tristan in The Waste Land (1922). James Joyce made numerous references to it in Finnegans Wake (1939). The line "three quarks for Muster Mark!" refers to King Marke, in a song sung by seagulls.

Greatly influenced by Wagner, Marcel Proust refers to Tristan and its "inexhaustible repetitions" throughout his novel In Search of Lost Time. He describes the prelude theme as "linked to the future, to the reality of the human soul, of which it was one of the most special and distinctive ornaments".

== Recordings ==
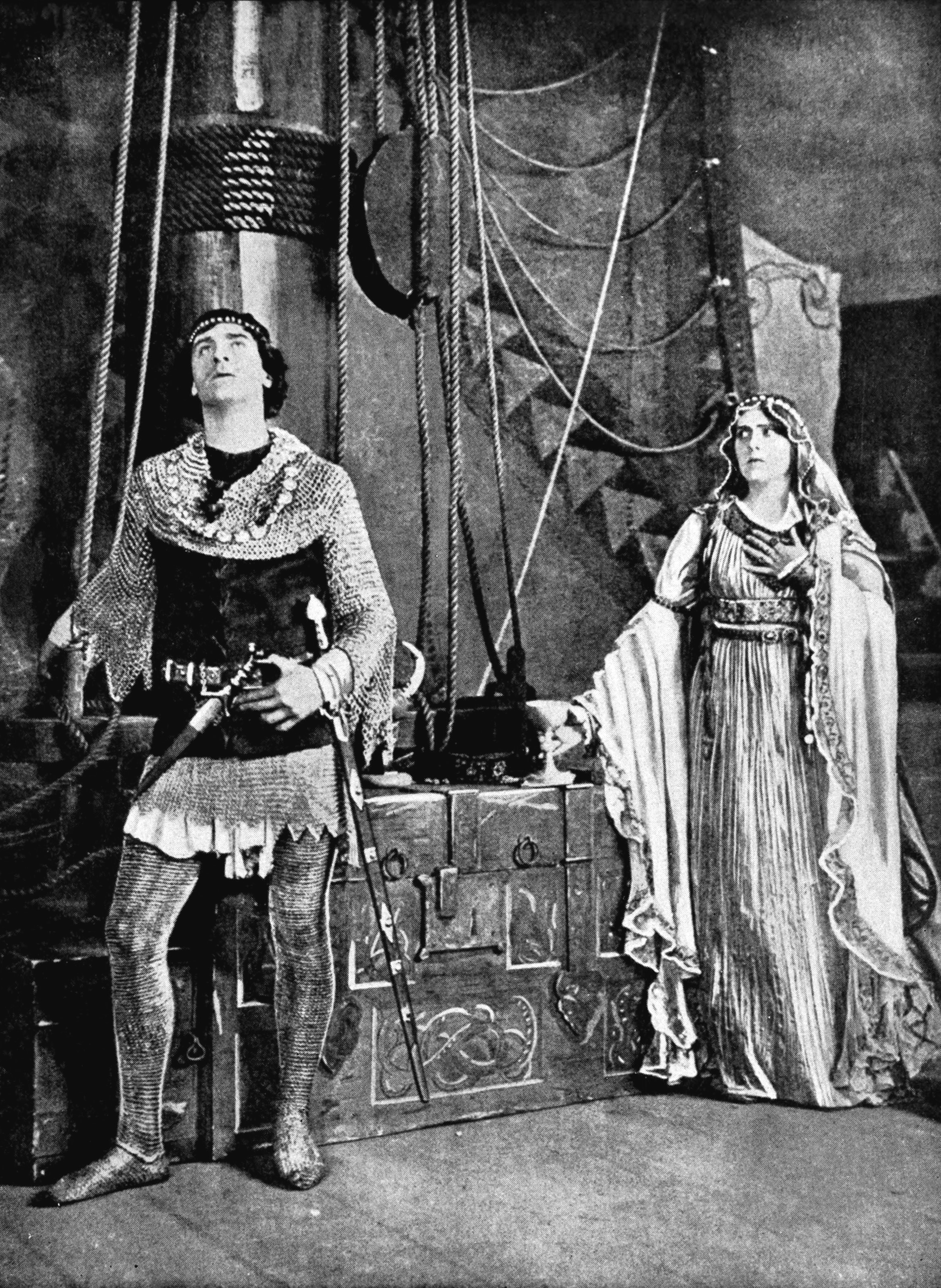
Photo from a 1917 production

Tristan und Isolde has a long recorded history and most of the major Wagner conductors since the end of the First World War have had their interpretations captured on disc. The limitations of recording technology meant that until the 1930s it was difficult to record the entire opera, however recordings of excerpts or single acts exist going back to 1901, when excerpts of Tristan were captured on the Mapleson Cylinders recorded during performances at the Metropolitan Opera.

In the years before World War II, Kirsten Flagstad and Lauritz Melchior were considered to be the prime interpreters of the lead roles, and mono recordings exist of this pair in a number of live performances led by conductors such as Thomas Beecham, Fritz Reiner, Artur Bodanzky and Erich Leinsdorf. Flagstad recorded the part commercially only near the end of her career in 1952, under Wilhelm Furtwängler for EMI, producing a set which is considered a classic recording.

Following the war, another classic recording is the 1952 performance at the Bayreuth Festival with Martha Mödl and Ramón Vinay under Herbert von Karajan, which is noted for its strong, vivid characterizations and is now available as a live recording. In the 1960s, the soprano Birgit Nilsson was considered the major Isolde interpreter, and she was often partnered with the Tristan of Wolfgang Windgassen. Their performance at Bayreuth in 1966 under the baton of Karl Böhm was captured by Deutsche Grammophon – a performance often hailed as one of the best Tristan recordings.

Karajan did not record the opera officially until 1971–72. Karajan's selection of a lighter soprano voice (Helga Dernesch) as Isolde, paired with an extremely intense Jon Vickers and the unusual balance between orchestra and singers favoured by Karajan was controversial. In the 1980s recordings by conductors such as Carlos Kleiber, Reginald Goodall, and Leonard Bernstein were mostly considered to be important for the interpretation of the conductor, rather than that of the lead performers. The set by Kleiber is notable as Isolde was sung by the famous Mozartian soprano Margaret Price, who never sang the role of Isolde on stage. The same is true for Plácido Domingo, who sang the role of Tristan to critical acclaim in the 2005 EMI release under the baton of Antonio Pappano despite never having sung the role on stage. In the last ten years acclaimed sets include a studio recording with the Berlin Philharmonic by Daniel Barenboim and a live set from the Vienna State Opera led by Christian Thielemann.

There are several DVD productions of the opera including Götz Friedrich's production at the Deutsche Oper in Berlin featuring the seasoned Wagnerians René Kollo and Dame Gwyneth Jones in the title roles. Deutsche Grammophon released a DVD of a Metropolitan Opera performance featuring Jane Eaglen and Ben Heppner, conducted by James Levine, in a production staged by Dieter Dorn and a DVD of the 1993 Bayreuth Festival production with conductor Daniel Barenboim and featuring Waltraud Meier as Isolde and Siegfried Jerusalem as Tristan, staged by Heiner Müller. More recently Barenboim's production at La Scala, Milan, in the production by Patrice Chéreau has also been issued on DVD. There is also a technically flawed, but historically important video recording with Birgit Nilsson and Jon Vickers from a 1973 live performance at the Théâtre antique d'Orange, conducted by Karl Böhm.

In a world first, the British opera house Glyndebourne made a full digital video download of the opera available for purchase online in 2009. The performance stars Robert Gambill as Tristan, Nina Stemme as Isolde, Katarina Karnéus as Brangäne, Bo Skovhus as Kurwenal, René Pape as King Marke, and Stephen Gadd as Melot, with Jiří Bělohlávek as the conductor, and was recorded on 1 and 6 August 2007.

A performance typically lasts approximately 3 hours and 50 minutes.

== Concert extracts and arrangements ==
The Prelude and Liebestod is a concert version of the overture and Isolde's act 3 aria, "Mild und leise". The arrangement was by Wagner himself, and it was first performed in 1862, several years before the premiere of the complete opera in 1865. The "Liebestod" can be performed either in a purely orchestral version, or with a soprano singing Isolde's vision of Tristan resurrected.

However, the first time the prelude and its opening "Tristan chord" was heard publicly was on 12 March 1859, when it was performed at the Sophieninselsaal in Prague, in a charity concert in aid of poor medical students, conducted by Hans von Bülow, who provided his own concert ending for the occasion. Wagner had authorised such an ending, but did not like what Bülow had done with it and later wrote his own. Wagner then included the prelude in his own three concerts at the Paris Théâtre-Italien in January–February 1860.

Wagner called the prelude the "Liebestod" (Love-death) while Isolde's final aria "Mild und leise" he called the "Verklärung" (Transfiguration). In 1867 his father-in-law Franz Liszt made a piano transcription of "Mild und leise", which he called "Liebestod" (S.447); he prefaced his score with a four-bar motto from the love duet from act 2, which in the opera is sung to the words "sehnend verlangter Liebestod". Liszt's transcription became well known throughout Europe well before Wagner's opera reached most places, and it is Liszt's title for the final scene that persists. The transcription was revised in 1875.

Wagner wrote a concert ending for the act 2 love duet for a planned 1862 concert performance that did not eventuate. The music was lost until 1950, then passed into private hands, before coming to the attention of Daniel Barenboim, who passed it on to Sir Antonio Pappano. The first recording of the Love Duet with the concert ending was made in 2000, with Plácido Domingo, Deborah Voigt and the Orchestra of the Royal Opera House under Pappano.

Chabrier worked themes from Tristan into a quadrille in Souvenirs de Munich. These were augmented and orchestrated by Markus Lehmann in 1988. Leopold Stokowski made a series of purely orchestral "Symphonic Syntheses" of Wagner's operas during his time as conductor of the Philadelphia Orchestra, bringing to concert audiences of the 1920s and '30s music they might not otherwise have heard. He made a 'long version' of music from Tristan and Isolde which consisted mainly of the act 1 prelude, the Liebesnacht from act 2 and the Liebestod from act 3. A shorter version of music from the 2nd and 3rd acts was called "Love Music from Tristan and Isolde". He made recordings of both versions on 78s and again on LP.

The British composer Ronald Stevenson has made two arrangements based on the opera. The first is The Fugue on the Shepherd's Air from Tristan und Isolde from 1999. Its composition was inspired by a lecture given by the Wagner biographer and chair of the Wagner Society of Scotland, Derek Watson, to whom the piece is dedicated. In a contrapuntal climax, Stevenson combines both the Shepherd's Air and Isolde's "Liebestod". The second is a setting, for voices and organ, of lines from Tom Hubbard's 1998 narrative poem in Scots, "Isolde's Luve-Daith", the premiere of which took place in Greyfriars Kirk, Edinburgh in March 2003.

In 2022, the music publisher Edition Peters published an arrangement of Prelude und Liebestod from Tristan und Isolde for chamber ensemble (12 or 13 musicians).

Electronic composer Paul Lansky quoted Tristan in his Mild und Lise (1972). This was sampled by Radiohead on Kid A (2000).

Other works based on the opera include:

- Clément Doucet's piano rags Isoldina and Wagneria.
- Hans Werner Henze's Tristan: Préludes für Klavier, Tonbänder und Orchester (1973);
- Peter Schickele's "Last Tango in Bayreuth", from Music for an Awful Lot of Winds and Percussion (1992)
- a 'symphonic compilation' Tristan und Isolde: an orchestral passion (1994) by Henk de Vlieger;
- a six-minute paraphrase by Enjott Schneider, Der Minuten-Tristan (1996), originally written for 12 pianists at six pianos;
- An arrangement of "Prelude und Liebestod" for string quartet and accordion, written for the Dudok Quartet Amsterdam (2021) by Max Knigge
- the Nachtstück (1980–83) for viola and chamber orchestra by Volker David Kirchner
- Franz Waxman, Fantasy based on themes from the opera, for violin and orchestra

== In popular culture ==
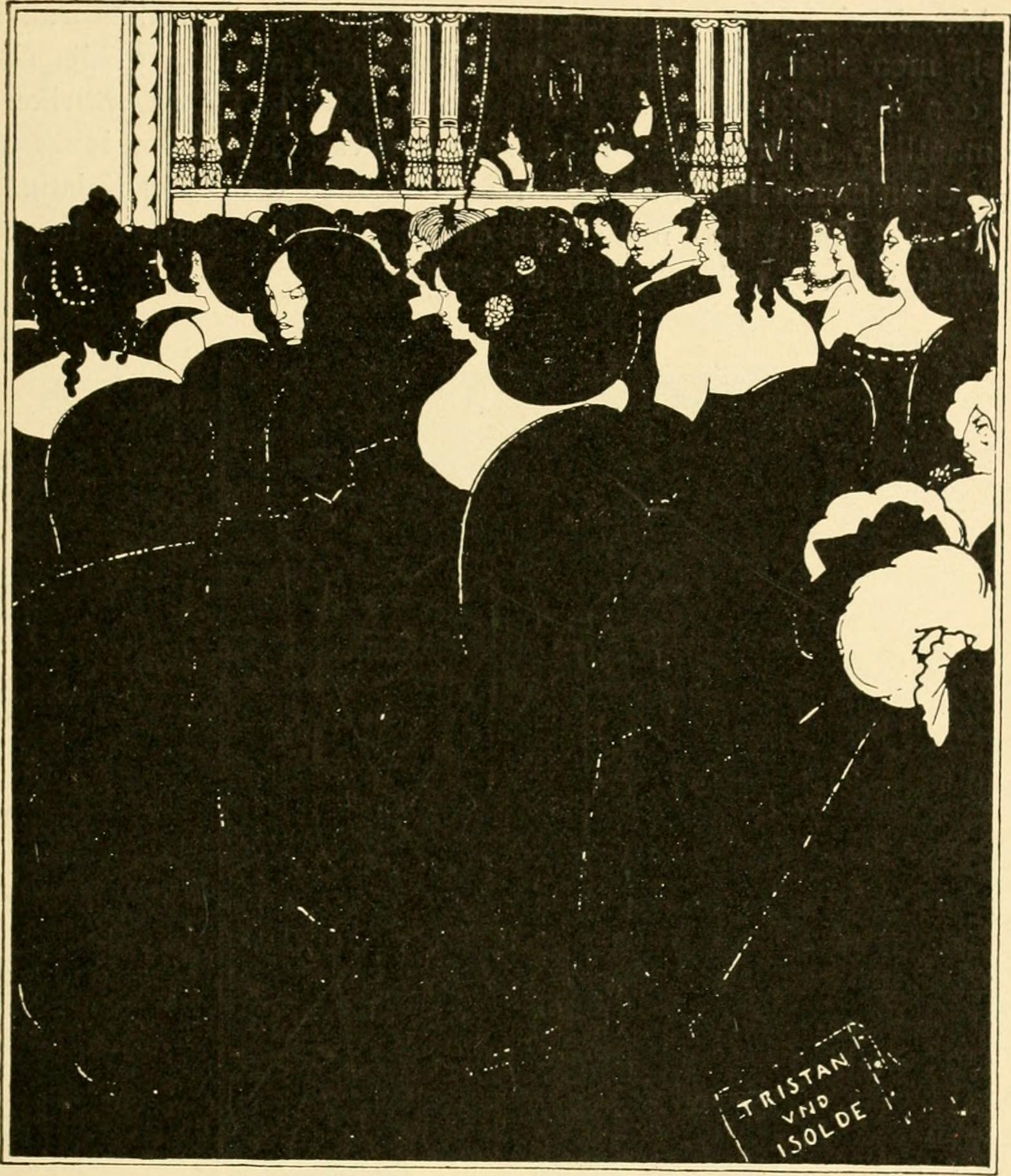
Beardsley: The Wagnerites

Aubrey Beardsley's pen and ink drawing The Wagnerites shows highly coiffured men and women attending a performance of Tristan und Isolde. The drawing was first published in the Yellow Book, vol III [October 1894]. According to Stephen Calloway, "Beardsley had an obsessive interest in Wagner, and avidly attended the London performances of the works. This depiction of the Wagnerian audience rather than the action of the opera identified by the fallen programme as Tristan and Isolde, is one of the greatest masterpieces of Beardsley's manière noire. Sickert claimed to have warned him that the drawings in which the area of black exceeded that of white paper were bound to fail artistically, and to have 'convinced him' of the truth of this aesthetic rule. Fortunately Beardsley seems to have ignored the advice." The drawing is in the collection of the Victoria and Albert Museum.

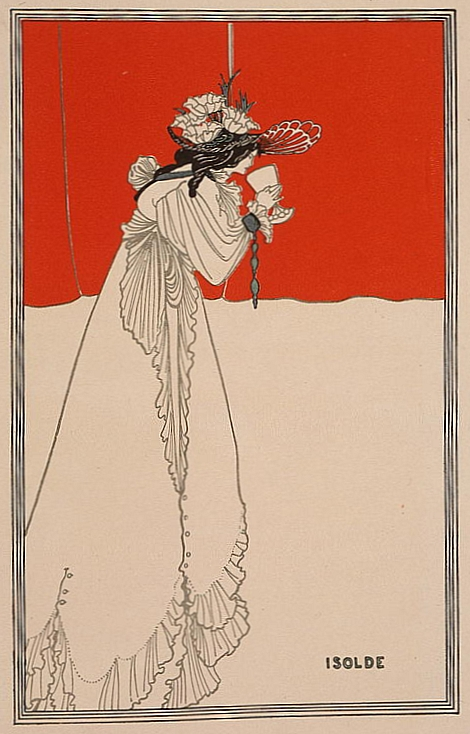
Beardsley: Isolde

The following year Beardsley produced a print depicting a stylised image of a woman, standing in front of a half length yellow curtain, wearing an ornate flowered hat and holding a large drinking vessel to her mouth. In the bottom right-hand corner is the word 'ISOLDE'. Isolde was first reproduced in colour lithography (red, green, grey and black) as a supplement to The Studio, October 1895. The drawing (in yellow, black and white) is in the collection of the Victoria and Albert Museum.

The opera forms the backdrop of Horacio Quiroga's tale of love lost, "La muerte de Isolda" (The Death of Isolde) from his collection Cuentos de amor de locura y de muerte (1917).

Luis Buñuel included the "Liebestod" in his surrealist films Un Chien Andalou (1929) and L'Age d'Or (1930). Bernard Herrmann's score for Alfred Hitchcock's Vertigo (1958) is heavily reminiscent of the "Liebestod", most evidently in the recognition scene. In Hitchcock's The Birds (1963), a recording of Tristan is prominently displayed in the scene in which Annie (Suzanne Pleshette) resignedly reveals to Melanie (Tippi Hedren) her unrequited love for Mitch. For Camille Paglia, the visual inclusion of the LP cover, with the opera's 'theme of self-immolation through doomed love' signifies that Annie is a forlorn romantic.

Dalit Warshaw's concerto for piano and orchestra, Conjuring Tristan, draws on the opera's leitmotifs to recast the narrative and dramatic events of Thomas Mann's Tristan through Wagner's music. Warshaw was inspired by developments in Mann's mediation of the Tristan legend which see a former pianist's love for music rekindled by the opera's score.

François Girard's Thirty Two Short Films About Glenn Gould (1993) features a young Gould listening to Toscanini conducting the Prelude.

Lars von Trier's 2011 film Melancholia prominently features music from the prelude.
