= Regina Schörg =

Austrian soprano and teacher (born 1969)

Regina Schörg (born 12 January 1969) is an Austrian soprano and teacher.

Born in Vienna, Schörg studied at the Konservatorium der Stadt Wien from 1989 to 1992, before joining the Linz State Theatre where she worked as a soloist from 1992 to 1997. From 1997 to 2001 she worked at the Vienna Volksoper, then moving on to the Vienna State Opera as soloist where she worked from 1997 to 2005. Internationally, she has performed key parts and leading roles at opera houses as far apart as Sydney and San Francisco, Berlin and Beijing, Toronto and Tokyo.

Her roles have included Fiordiligi in Così fan tutte, La Contessa in Le Nozze di Figaro, Pamina in Die Zauberflöte, Donna Anna in Don Giovanni and Violetta in La traviata, as well as Rosalinde in Die Fledermaus.
