= Alois Ander =

German opera singer

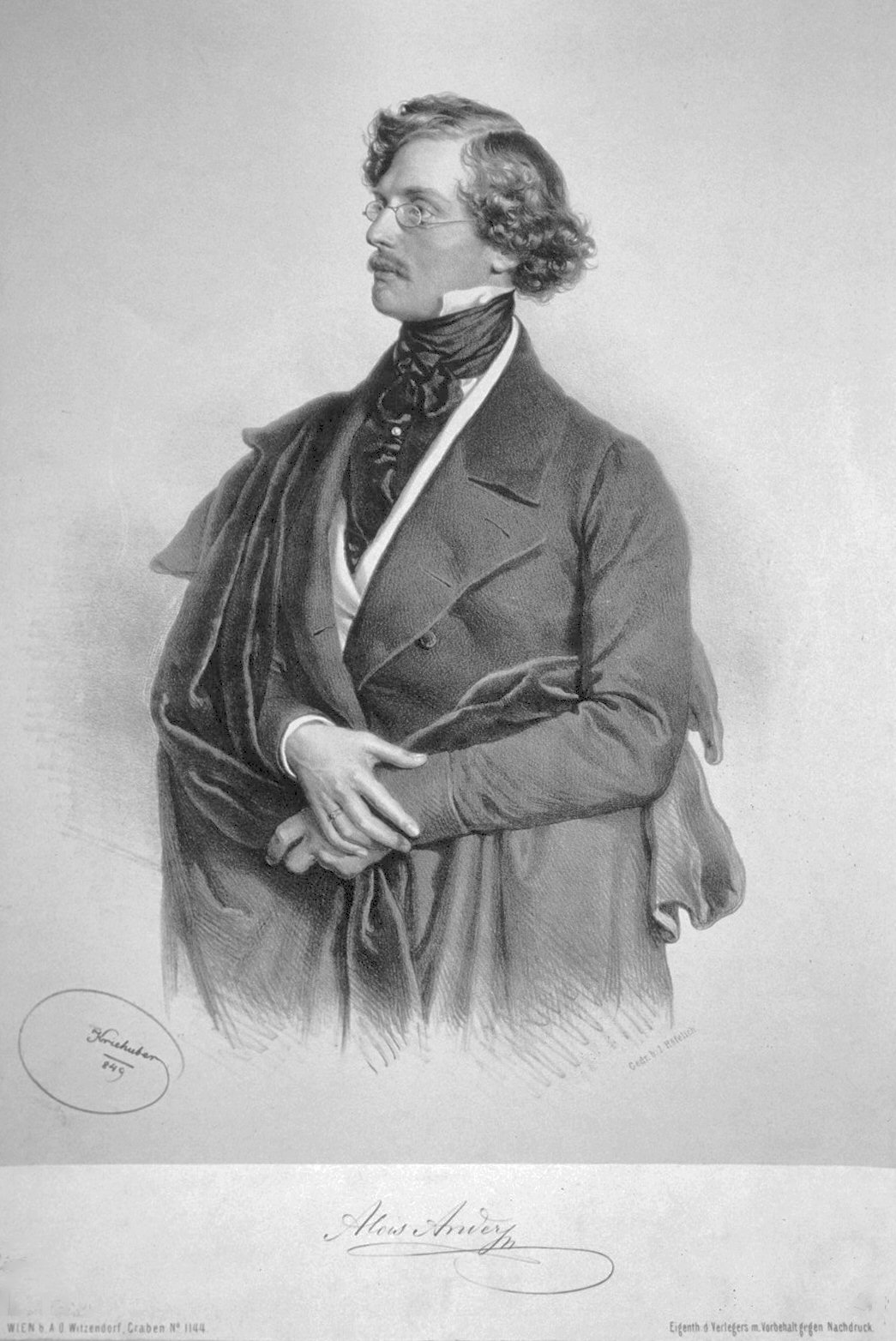
Alois Ander, lithograph by Josef Kriehuber, 1849

Alois Ander (also Aloys; 24 August 1821 – 11 December 1864) was a German operatic tenor, active in Vienna in the middle of the nineteenth century. In 1900, Carl Ferdinand Pohl called him "one of the most famous German tenor singers of recent times."

== Career ==
He was born Aloys Anderle at Libitz (now Libice nad Doubravou) in Bohemia. His voice, though not powerful, was extremely sympathetic in quality. He went to Vienna in the hope that his talents would be recognised there, but it required all the energy and influence of Franz Wild the singer, at that time Ober-Regisseur to the Theater am Kärntnertor, before he was allowed to appear there. He appeared for the first time on 22 October 1845 as Stradella in the opera of that name, though with no previous experience of the boards whatever. His success was complete, and decided his course for life, and that single night raised him from a simple clerk to the rank of a "primo tenore assoluto."

Still more remarkable was his success in the Le prophète, which was given in Vienna for the first time on 28 February 1850. Meyerbeer interested himself in the rapid progress of Ander, and from that date he became the established favourite of the Vienna public, to whom he remained faithful, notwithstanding tempting offers of engagements elsewhere. His last great part was that of Lohengrin, in which he combined all his extraordinary powers. His last appearance was as Arnold in William Tell, on 19 September 1864; he was then failing, and shortly afterwards totally collapsed. He was taken to the Bath of Wartenberg in Bohemia, where he died on 11 December, and was buried five days later in Vienna's Matzleinsdorf Cemetery amid tokens of universal affection. In 1894 his remains were transferred to an honorary grave in the Zentralfriedhof (Group 32 A, No. 14) in Vienna.

== Technique ==
As an actor, he was greatly gifted, and had the advantage of a very attractive appearance. His voice, not strong and somewhat veiled in tone, was in harmony with all his other qualities; his conceptions were full of artistic earnestness, and animated by a noble vein of poetry. His physical strength however was unequal to the excitement of acting, and was impaired by the artificial means which he took to support himself.
