= List of prose works by Richard Wagner =

Richard Wagner's Prose Works

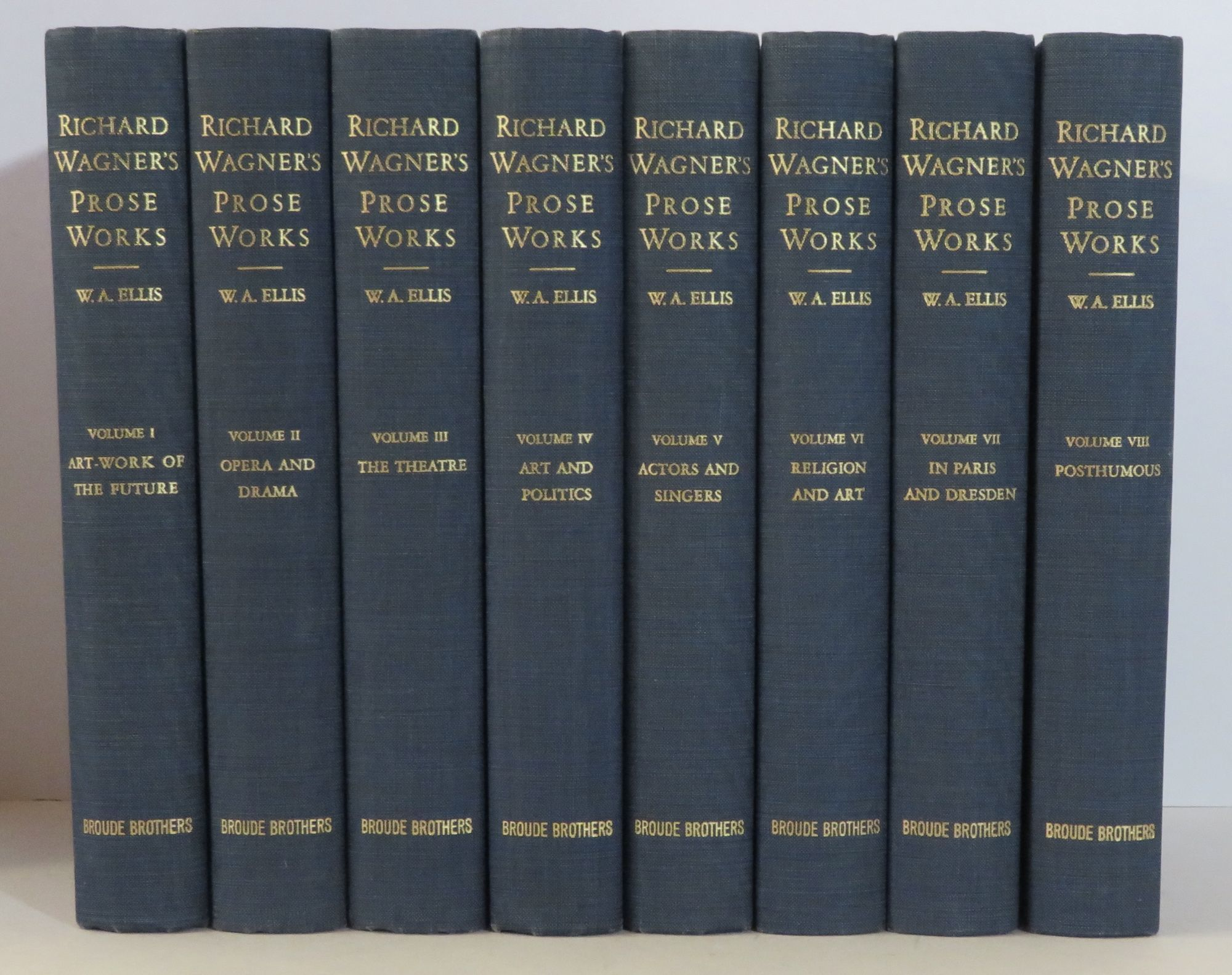
Wagner's prose works, the complete English translations volumes I through VIII, translated by William Ashton Ellis.

This is a list of mostly prose works by the German composer Richard Wagner. In addition to writing operas, Wagner was a prolific essayist.

Wagner began compiling his prose and poetry in the 1860s, going on to publish them in ten volumes as the Gesammelte Schriften und Dichtungen (GS&D, Collected Writings and Poems). The first edition was published in Leipzig by Fritzsch, Wagner's main publisher, between 1871 and 1883. The Collected Writings and Poems includes essays, theoretical treatises, poems, published letters, and opera libretti, reflecting Wagner's thoughts on music, art, politics, religion, and philosophy.

The list has been structured and named according to the conventions of William Ashton Ellis, who first translated and published the complete prose works in English in eight volumes between 1892 and 1907. The libretti (poems) of Wagner's completed stage works are not included.

Ellis Volume	First Published	English Title	Original Title	GS&D Vol.	Notes
1: The Art-Work of the Future, etc.	1842	Autobiographical Sketch	Autobiographische Skizze	1	
1: The Art-Work of the Future, etc.	1849	Art and Revolution	Die Kunst und die Revolution	3	
1: The Art-Work of the Future, etc.	1849	The Artwork of the Future	Das Kunstwerk der Zukunft	3	
1: The Art-Work of the Future, etc.	1849	Wieland the Smith	Wieland der Schmied: Als Drama entworfen	3	Dramatic sketch
1: The Art-Work of the Future, etc.	1850	Art and Climate	Kunst und Klima	3	
1: The Art-Work of the Future, etc.	1851	A Communication to My Friends	Eine Mitteilung an meine Freunde	4	
2: Opera and Drama	1852	Opera and Drama	Oper und Drama	3 & 4	
3: The Theatre	1851	On the "Goethe-Stiftung"	Über die "Goethestiftung": Brief an Franz Liszt	5	
3: The Theatre	1851	A Theatre at Zurich	Ein Theater in Zürich	5	
3: The Theatre	1852	On Musical Criticism	Über musikalische Kritik	5	
3: The Theatre	1850	Judaism in Music	Das Judenthum in der Musik	5	Republished in 1869 with commentary
3: The Theatre	1851	Mementoes of Spontini	Erinnerungen an Spontini	5	
3: The Theatre	1859	Homage to L. Sphor and W. Fischer	Nachruf an L. Spohr und Chordirektor W. Fischer	5	
3: The Theatre	1854	Gluck's Overture to "Iphigenia in Aulis"	Gluck's Ouvertüre zu Iphigenia in Aulis	5	
3: The Theatre	1852	On the Performing of "Tannhäuser"	Über die Aufführung des Tannhäuser	5	
3: The Theatre	1853	Remarks on Performing "The Flying Dutchman"	Bemerkungen zur Aufführung der Oper Der fliegende Holländer	5	
3: The Theatre	1852	Beethoven's "Heroic Symphony"	Programmatische Erläuterungen: Beethovens heroische Symphonie	5	Explanatory programme
3: The Theatre	1852	Beethoven's Overture to "Coriolanus"	Programmatische Erläuterungen: Ouvertüre zu Coriolan	5	Explanatory programme
3: The Theatre	1853	Overture to "Die fliegende Holländer"	Programmatische Erläuterungen: Der fliegende Holländer	5	Explanatory programme
3: The Theatre	1853	Overture to "Tannhäuser"	Programmatische Erläuterungen: Tannhäuser	5	Explanatory programme
3: The Theatre	1853	Prelude to "Lohengrin"	Programmatische Erläuterungen: Vorspiel zu Lohengrin	5	Explanatory programme
3: The Theatre	1853	On Franz Liszt's Symphonic Poems	Über Franz Liszt's symphonische Dichtungen	5	
3: The Theatre	1872	Epilogue to The "Nibelung's Ring"	Bericht an den Deutschen Wagner-Verein über die Umstände und Schicksale, welche die Ausführung des Bühnenfestspieles "Der Ring des Nibelungen" begleiten.		
3: The Theatre	1863	Preface to The "Ring" Poem			
3: The Theatre	1860	A Letter to Hector Berlioz	Ein Brief an Hector Berlioz	7	
3: The Theatre	1861	"Music of the Future"	"Zukunftsmusik"	7	
3: The Theatre	1861	A Report on the Production of "Tannhäuser" in Paris	Bericht über die Aufführung des Tannhäuser in Paris	7	
3: The Theatre	1863	The Vienna Opera-House	Das Wiener Hof-Operntheater	7	
3: The Theatre	1864	To the Kingly Friend	Dem königlichen Freunde: Gedicht	8	Poem
4: Art and Politics	1864	On State and Religion	Über Staat und Religion	8	
4: Art and Politics	1867	German Art and German Policy	Deutsche Kunst und deutsche Politik	8	
4: Art and Politics	1878	What is German?	Was ist Deutsch?	10	Written c. 1865
4: Art and Politics	1865	A Music-School for Munich	Bericht an König Ludwig II. von Bayern über eine in München zu errichtende deutsche Musikschule	8	
4: Art and Politics	1868	Ludwig Schnorr of Carolsfeld	Meine Erinnerungen an Ludwig Schnorr von Carolsfeld	8	
4: Art and Politics	1867	W. H. Riehl	Censuren: W.H. Riehl	8	Notices
4: Art and Politics	1867	Ferdinand Hiller	Censuren: Ferdinand Hiller	8	Notices
4: Art and Politics	1868	A Remembrance of Rossini	Censuren: eine Erinnerung an Rossini	8	Notices
4: Art and Politics	1869	Eduard Devrient	Censuren: Eduard Devrient	8	Notices
4: Art and Politics	1869	About Conducting	Über das Dirigieren]	8	
4: Art and Politics	1868	Rheingold	Drei Gedichte: Rheingold	8	"Three Poems"
4: Art and Politics	1869	On the Completion of Siegfried	Drei Gedichte: Bei der Vollendung des Siegfried	8	"Three Poems"
4: Art and Politics	1870	August 25th, 1870	Drei Gedichte: Zum 25. August 1879	8	"Three Poems"
4: Art and Politics	1871	To the German Army before Paris	An das deutsche Heer von Paris	9	Poem
4: Art and Politics	1873	A Capitulation	Eine Kapitulation: Lustspiel in antiker Manier	9	Dramatic sketch
5: Actors and Singers	1871	Reminiscences of Auger	Erinnerungen an Auber	9	
5: Actors and Singers	1870	Beethoven (Wagner)	Beethoven	9	
5: Actors and Singers	1871	The Destiny of Opera	Über die Bestimmung der Oper	9	
5: Actors and Singers	1872	Actors and Singers	Über Schauspieler und Sänger	9	
5: Actors and Singers	1873	The Rendering of Beethoven's Ninth Symphony	Zum Vortrag der neunten Symphonie Beethoven's	9	
5: Actors and Singers	1872	Letter to an Actor	Brief über das Schauspielerwesen an einen Schauspieler	9	"Letters and Short Essays"
5: Actors and Singers	1873	A Glance at the German Operatic Stage of Today	Ein Einblick in das heutige deutsche Opernwesen	9	"Letters and Short Essays"
5: Actors and Singers	1871	Letter to an Italian Friend on the Production of "Lohengrin"	Brief an einen italienischen Freund über die Aufführung des Lohengrin in Bologna	9	"Letters and Short Essays"
5: Actors and Singers	1872	To the Burgomaster of Bologna	Schreiben an den Bürgermeister von Bologna	9	"Letters and Short Essays"
5: Actors and Singers	1872	To Friedrich Nietzsche	An Friedrich Nietzsche, ord. Prof. der Klassischen Philologie in Basel	9	"Letters and Short Essays"
5: Actors and Singers	1872	On the Name "Musikdrama"	Über die Benennung 'Musikdrama'	9	"Letters and Short Essays"
5: Actors and Singers	1873	Prologue to a Reading of "Die Götterdämmerung"	Einleitung zu einer Vorlesung der Götterdämmerung vor einem ausgewählten Zuhörerkreis in Berlin	9	"Letters and Short Essays"
5: Actors and Singers	1873	Final Report on the Fates and Circumstances	Epilogischer Bericht über die Umstände und Schicksale, welche die Ausführung des Bühnenfestspieles Der Ring des Nibelungen bis zur Veröffentlichung der Dichtung begleiteten	6	"Bayreuth"
5: Actors and Singers	1873	The Festival-Playhouse at Bayreuth	Das Bühnenfestspielhaus zu Bayreuth	9	"Bayreuth"
6: Religion and Art	1875	Spohr's "Jessonda" at Leipzig	Über eine Opernaufführung in Leipzig	10	
6: Religion and Art	1877	To the Presidents of Wagner-Vereins	An die geehrten Vorstände der Richard Wagner-Vereine	10	Minor Bayreuth Papers
6: Religion and Art	1878	Proposed Bayreuth "School"	Entwurf, veröffentlicht mit den Statuten des Patronat- vereines	10	Minor Bayreuth Papers
6: Religion and Art	1878	Introduction to First Number of the Bayreuther Blätter	Zur Einführung. (Bayreuther Blätter, Erstes Stück.)	10	Minor Bayreuth Papers
6: Religion and Art	1879	Introduction to a Work of Hans Von Wolzogen's	Ein Wort zur Einführung der Arbeit Hans von Wolzogen's Über Verrottung und Errettung der deutschen Sprache	10	Minor Bayreuth Papers
6: Religion and Art	1879	Postponement of "Parsifal"	Erklärung an die Mitglicher des Patronatvereines	10	Minor Bayreuth Papers
6: Religion and Art	1879	Introduction to the Year 1880	Zur Einführung in das Jahr 1880	10	Minor Bayreuth Papers
6: Religion and Art	1880	Announcement of "Parsifal" Performance	Zur Mittheilung an die geehrten Patrone der Bühnenfest-spiele in Bayreuth.	10	Minor Bayreuth Papers
6: Religion and Art	1881	Introduction to a Work of Count Gobineau's	Zur Einführung der Arbeit des Grafen Gobineau	10	Minor Bayreuth Papers
6: Religion and Art	1878	Modern	Modern	10	
6: Religion and Art	1878	Public and Popularity	Publikum und Popularität	10	
6: Religion and Art	1878	The Public in Time and Space	Das Publikum in Zeit und Raum	10	
6: Religion and Art	1878	Retrospect of the Stage-Festivals of 1876	Ein Rückblick auf die Bühnenfestspiele des Jahres 1876	10	
6: Religion and Art	1879	Shall We Hope?	Wollen wir hoffen?	10	
6: Religion and Art	1879	On Poetry and Composition	Über das Dichten und Komponieren	10	
6: Religion and Art	1879	On Operatic Poetry and Composition	Über das Opern-Dichten und Komponieren im Besonderen	10	
6: Religion and Art	1879	On the Application of Music to the Drama	Über die Anwendung der Musik auf das Drama	10	
6: Religion and Art	1879	Against Vivisection	Offenes Schreiben an Herrn Ernst von Weber	10	
6: Religion and Art	1880	Religion and Art	Religion und Kunst	10	
6: Religion and Art	1880	What Boots this Knowledge?	Was nüßt diese Erkenntniß?	10	Supplement to "Religion and Art"
6: Religion and Art	1881	Know Thyself	Erkenne dich selbst	10	Supplement to "Religion and Art"
6: Religion and Art	1881	Hero-dom and Christendom	Heldenthum und Christenthum	10	Supplement to "Religion and Art"
6: Religion and Art	1882	End of the Patronat-Verein	Brief an H. v. Wolzogen	10	
6: Religion and Art	1882	The Stipendiary Fund	Offenes Schreiben an Herrn Friedrich Schön in Worms	10	
6: Religion and Art	1882	"Parsifal" at Bayreuth	Das Bühnenweihfestspiel in Bayreuth 1882	10	
6: Religion and Art	1883	A Youthful Symphony	Bericht über die Wiederaufführung eines Jugendwerkes	10	
6: Religion and Art	1883	Letter to H. V. Stein	Brief an H. v. Stein	10	
6: Religion and Art	1885	The Human Womanly	Über das Weibliche im Menschlichen		Fragment
7: In Paris and Dresden	1836	"Das Liebesverbot": Account of a first Operatic Performance	Das Liebesverbot: Bericht über eine erste Opernaufführung	1	
7: In Paris and Dresden	1840	A Pilgrimage to Beethoven	Eine Pilgerfahrt zu Beethoven	1	"A German Musician in Paris"
7: In Paris and Dresden	1841	An End in Paris	Ein Ende in Paris	1	"A German Musician in Paris"
7: In Paris and Dresden	1841	A Happy Evening	Ein glücklicher Abend	1	"A German Musician in Paris"
7: In Paris and Dresden	1840	On German Music	Über deutsches Musikwesen	1	"A German Musician in Paris"
7: In Paris and Dresden	1840	Pergolesi's "Stabat Mater"	Pergolesis Stabat Mater	1	"A German Musician in Paris"
7: In Paris and Dresden	1840	The Virtuoso and the Artist	Der Virtuos und der Künstler	1	"A German Musician in Paris"
7: In Paris and Dresden	1840	Du Métier de Virtuose	Du Métier de Virtuose	1	"A German Musician in Paris"
7: In Paris and Dresden	1841	The Artist and Publicity	Der Künstler und die Öffentlichkeit	1	"A German Musician in Paris"
7: In Paris and Dresden	1841	Rossini's "Stabat Mater"	Rossinis Stabat Mater	1	"A German Musician in Paris"
7: In Paris and Dresden	1841	On the Overture	Über die Ouvertüre	1	
7: In Paris and Dresden	1841	To the Paris Public	An das Pariser Publikum	1	"Der Freischütz in Paris"
7: In Paris and Dresden	1841	Report to Germany	Bericht nach Deutschland	1	"Der Freischütz in Paris"
7: In Paris and Dresden	1842	Halévy's "Reine de Chypre"	Bericht über eine neue Pariser Oper (La Reine de Chypre von Halévy)	1	
7: In Paris and Dresden	1871	Author's Introduction to Vol. II of the Gesammelte Schriften		2	
7: In Paris and Dresden	1844	Weber's Re-interment	Bericht über die Heimbringung der sterblichen Überreste Carl Maria von Weber's aus London nach Dresden	2	
7: In Paris and Dresden	1846	Beethoven's Choral Symphony at Dresden	Bericht über die Aufführung der neunten Symphonie von Beethoven im Jahre 1846	2	
7: In Paris and Dresden	1848	The Wibelungen	Die Wibelungen: Weltgeschichte aus der Sage	2	
7: In Paris and Dresden	1848	The Nibelungen-Myth	Der Nibelungen-Mythus: Als Entwurf zu einem Drama	2	Dramatic sketch
7: In Paris and Dresden	1848	Tercentenary Toast	Trinkspruch am Gedenktag des 300-jährigen Bestehens der königlichen musikalischen Kapelle in Dresden	2	
7: In Paris and Dresden	1849	Plan of Organisation of a German National Theatre	Entwurf zur Organisation eines deutschen Nationaltheaters für das Königreich Sachsen	2	
8: Posthumous, etc.	1848	Siegfried's Death	Siegfried's Tod	2	Dramatic sketch
8: Posthumous, etc.	1834	On German Opera			Discarded
8: Posthumous, etc.	1834	Pasticcio			Discarded
8: Posthumous, etc.	1837	Bellini: A Word in Season	Bellini. Ein Wort zu seiner Zeit		Discarded
8: Posthumous, etc.	1841	Parisian Amusements			Discarded
8: Posthumous, etc.	1841	Parisian Fatalities for the German			Discarded
8: Posthumous, etc.	1841	Letters from Paris, 1841			Discarded
8: Posthumous, etc.	1842	Halévy and "La Reine de Chypre"			Discarded
8: Posthumous, etc.	1846	Jottings on the Ninth Symphony			Discarded
8: Posthumous, etc.	1846	Artist and Critic			Discarded
8: Posthumous, etc.	1848	Greeting from Saxony to the Viennese			Discarded
8: Posthumous, etc.	1849	On E. Devrient's "History of German Acting"			Discarded
8: Posthumous, etc.	1849	Theatre-Reform			Discarded
8: Posthumous, etc.	1849	Man and Established Society			Discarded
8: Posthumous, etc.	1849	The Revolution			Discarded
8: Posthumous, etc.	1865	Invitation to the Production of "Tristan in Munich"			Discarded
8: Posthumous, etc.	1889	The Saracen Woman			Dramatic sketch, written 1841-1843
8: Posthumous, etc.	1899	Sketch for "The Apostles' Love-Feast"	Das Liebesmahl der Apostel		Prose sketch, written 1843
8: Posthumous, etc.	1887	Jesus of Nazareth	Jesus von Nazareth		Prose sketch, written 1848-1849
8: Posthumous, etc.	1885	A Title-Page			Sketches and fragments
8: Posthumous, etc.	1885	Personal			Sketches and fragments
8: Posthumous, etc.	1885	A Sketch, a Reflection, and Four Programmes			Sketches and fragments
8: Posthumous, etc.	1885	Metaphysics, Ethics and Art			Sketches and fragments
8: Posthumous, etc.	1885	On the Womanly in the Human			Sketches and fragments
Misc	1880	My Life	Mein Leben Vol. 1, Vol. 2		Wagner's autobiography
