= Autobiographic Sketch (Wagner) =

Richard Wagner's "Autobiographic Sketch" (in the original German, Autobiographische Skizze) was written in 1842. It is the composer's earliest autobiographical account.

== Background ==
Wagner wrote the "Autobiographic Sketch" following his unsuccessful years in Paris (1839–42) at the request of Heinrich Laube, the editor of the magazine Zeitung für die Elegante Welt (Journal for Elegant Society). Wagner submitted it literally as a sketch – the sentences are short and the grammar far less convoluted than his normal writing style – expecting that Laube would expand it. However, Laube published it (in 1843) just as it was, commenting

The storm and stress of Paris have turned the Musician into a Writer. I should only spoil the life-sketch, did I attempt to alter a word of it

== Contents ==
In the first pages, Wagner gives a breezy and self-deprecating account of his early life and ambitions. At the age of 21 he hears for the first time the singer Wilhelmine Schröder-Devrient in Vincenzo Bellini's opera of Romeo and Juliet - "I was astounded to witness so extraordinary a rendering of such utterly meaningless music".

A racy description follows of his adventures and misadventures as a conductor and composer in Germany and the Baltics, including the story of a storm off Norway which he claims inspired his opera The Flying Dutchman. Finally, he arrives in Paris. He describes the uncertain support he received from Giacomo Meyerbeer, his uneasy relations with Hector Berlioz, and his misery working as a hack for the publisher Maurice Schlesinger.

Leaving Paris in 1842, he concludes:

For the first time I saw the Rhine - with hot tears in my eyes, I, poor artist, swore eternal fidelity to my German fatherland
