= List of compositions by Richard Wagner =

This is a sortable list of compositions by Richard Wagner.

WWV	Title	Form or genre
== Chamber works ==
4	String Quartet in D major (1829; lost; occasionally mistaken for the Starnberg Quartet, no evidence of the Starnberg Quartet's existence survives)	chamber music
== Orchestral works ==
=== Symphonies ===
29	Symphony in C major (1832)	orchestral
35	Symphony in E major (1834; uncompleted; first movement finished; second movement unfinished)	orchestral
78	Symphonies (1846-47; uncompleted; sketches exist for at least two symphonies)	orchestral
=== Overture ===
10	Overture in B♭ major ("Paukenschlag-Ouvertüre") (1830; lost)	orchestral
11	Politische Ouvertüre (c. 1830; lost and likely uncompleted)	orchestral
12	Overture to Schiller's Die Braut von Messina (1830; lost?)	orchestral
14	Overture in C major (1830; lost)	orchestral
17	Overture in E♭ major (1831; lost and likely uncompleted)	orchestral
20	Concert Overture No. 1 in D minor (1831)	orchestral
24	Overture in E minor and incidental music to Raupach's König Enzio (1832; only the Overture survives)	orchestral
27	Concert Overture No. 2 in C major (1832)	orchestral
37	Overture and incidental music to Guido Theodor Apel's historic drama Columbus (1834-35; only the Overture survives)	orchestral
39	Polonia Overture in C major (1836)	orchestral
42	Rule Britannia Overture in D major (1837)	orchestral
59	Eine Faust-Ouvertüre (1855, second version; 1840, first version originally conceived as the first movement to a Faust Symphony)	orchestral
=== Other orchestral works ===
13	Orchestral work in E minor (c. 1830; fragment)	orchestral
25	Entreactes tragiques No. 1 in D major, No. 2 in C minor (c. 1832)	orchestral
73	Trauermusik (Funeral Music), on motifs from Weber's Euryanthe (1844) (for large wind band)	orchestral
91B	Träume. Version for violin and chamber orchestra (1857)	orchestral
97	Huldigungsmarsch (1864, version for military band; 1871, orchestral version)	orchestral
98	Romeo und Julie (1868; sketches / uncompleted)	orchestral
103	Siegfried Idyll (1870)	orchestral
104	Kaisermarsch (1871)	orchestral
107	Plans for overtures and symphonies (1874–83; uncompleted)	orchestral
110	Großer Festmarsch zur Eröffnung der hundertjährigen Gedenkfeier der Unabhängigkeitserklärung der Vereinigten Staaten (Grand Festive March for the Opening of the Centennial Celebration of the Declaration of Independence of the United States of America) (1876)	orchestral
== Piano ==
2	Sonata in D minor (1829; lost)	piano
5	Sonata in F minor (1829; lost)	piano
16	Sonata in B♭ major, for four hands (1831; lost)	piano 4-hands
21	Sonata in B♭ major, Op. 1 (1831)	piano
22	Fantasia in F♯ minor (1831)	piano
23A	Polonaise for piano (1831–32)	piano
23B	Polonaise for piano, four hands (1831-32)	piano 4-hands
26	Grand Sonata in A major (1832)	piano
64	Albumblatt für Ernst Benedikt Kietz: "Lied ohne Worte" (c. 1840)	piano
84	Polka (1853)	piano
85	Eine Sonate für das Album von Frau Mathilde Wesendonck (1853)	piano
88	Züricher Vielliebchen-Walzer (1854)	piano
93	Elegy in A♭ major (c. 1858; rev. 1881)	piano
94	In the album of Fürstin M (1861)	piano
95	Ankunft bei den schwarzen Schwänen (1861)	piano
108	Albumblatt für Frau Betty Schott (1875)	piano
=== Lieder ===
7	Lieder (1828–30; sketches / drafts)	Lied
15	Seven Compositions on Goethe's Faust (1831)	Lied
30	Glockentöne (Abendglocken) (1832; lost)	Lied
50	"Der Tannenbaum" (c. 1838)	Lied
53	Dors, mon enfant (1839)	Lied
54	Extase (1839; fragment)	Lied
55	Attente (1839)	Lied
56	La tombe dit à rose (1839; fragment)	Lied
57	Mignonne (1839)	Lied
58	Tout n'est qu'images fugitives (Soupir) (1839)	Lied
60	Les deux grenadiers (1839-40)	Lied
61	Adieux de Marie Stuart (1840)	Lied
91	Wesendonck Lieder (1858, third version; 1857-58, second and first version)	Lied
92	Es ist bestimmt in Gottes Rat (c. 1858; draft)	Lied
105	Der Worte viele sind gemacht (1871)	Lied
== Arias ==
3	Aria (1829; lost)	aria
8	Aria for soprano and orchestra (early 1830?; lost)	aria
28	Scene and Aria for soprano and orchestra (1832; lost)	aria
33	Aria No. 15 (Aubry) "Wie ein schöner Frühlingsmorgen" from the opera Der Vampyr by Heinrich Marschner with a new allegro "Doch jetzt, wohin ich blicke, umgibt mich Schreckensnacht" (1833)	aria
43	"Sanfte Wehmut will sich regen". Aria for bass and orchestra. Excerpt from the opera Mary, Max und Michel by Carl Blum (1837)	aria
45	Bass aria from Die Schweizer Familie (c. 1837; lost)	aria
52	"Norma il predisse, o Druidi", aria for bass, male chorus, and orchestra for the opera Norma by Vincenzo Bellini (1839)	aria
=== Opera ===
6	Pastoral opera (unnamed) (early 1830?; lost)	Oper
31	Die Hochzeit (1832–33; unfinished)	Oper
32	Die Feen (1833-1834; rev. 1834)	Große romantische Oper
38	Das Liebesverbot oder Die Novize von Palermo (1835–36)	Große komische Oper
40	Die hohe Braut (c. 1836-42; libretto completed; little to no music composed)	Große Oper
48	Männerlist größer als Frauenlist, oder Die glückliche Bärenfamilie (c. 1838; libretto completed; only three musical numbers completed, all in piano score)	komische Oper
49	Rienzi, der letzte der Tribunen (1837-1840; rev. 1843-1844, 1847)	Große tragische Oper
63	Der fliegende Holländer (1840–41; rev. 1846, 1852, 1860)	romantische Oper
66	Die Sarazenin (c. 1841-43; libretto drafted; no music composed)	Oper
67	Die Bergwerke zu Falun (1842; libretto drafted; no music composed)	Oper
70	Tannhäuser und der Sängerkrieg auf Wartburg (1842–45; rev. 1845, 1847, 1851, 1860-61, 1865, 1875)	Große romantische Oper
75	Lohengrin (1845-1848)	romantische Oper
76	Friedrich I. (1846-49; sketches only)	Oper ?
80	Jesus of Nazareth (1849; scenario and 1 musical sketch)	Oper ?
81	Achilleus (1849–50; only prose drafts exist)	Oper ?
82	Wieland der Schmied (1849–50; only prose drafts exist)	Heldenoper
86A	Das Rheingold (1851–54)	Bühnenfestspiel, Vorabend
86B	Die Walküre (1851–56)	Bühnenfestspiel, erster Tag
86C	Siegfried (1851–71)	Bühnenfestspiel, zweiter Tag
86D	Götterdämmerung (1848–74)	Bühnenfestspiel, dritter Tag
89	Die Sieger (1856; only a short prose sketch exists)	Oper
90	Tristan und Isolde (1854–59)	Handlung
96	Die Meistersinger von Nürnberg (1845–67)	Oper
99	Luther's Wedding (1868; only prose sketches exist; no music composed)	Oper ?
111	Parsifal (1857–82)	Bühnenweihfestspiel
=== Other vocal works ===
1	Leubald (1826–28; music lost, libretto survives)	Trauerspiel
19A	Study fugue "Dein ist das Reich" (1831–32)	choral
19B	Double Fugue (1831–32; no instrumentation or text set)	
36	Incidental music for Wilhelm Schmale's one-act allegorical play Beim Antritt des neuen Jahres 1835 (1834)	choral
41	Incidental music to J. Singer's play Die letzte Heidenverschwörung in Preußen oder Der Deutsche Ritterorden in Königsberg (c. 1837; fragment; lost)	incidental music
44	Folk hymn Nicolay (1837)	choral
51	Gesang am Grabe (Funeral Dirge) (1838-39; lost)	choral
65	"Descendons gaiement la courtille". Contribution to the Vaudeville-Ballet-Pantomime La descente de la courtille by Th. Marion Dumersan and Ch.-Désiré Dupeuty, for chorus and orchestra (c. 1841)	vocal orchestral
68A	Festgesang Der Tag erscheint (1843; male chorus a cappella, TTBB)	choral
68B	Festgesang Der Tag erscheint (c. 1843; male chorus with brass instruments, 4hn, 4tpt, 3 trbn, bass tuba)	choral
69	Das Liebesmahl der Apostel (1843)	choral
71	Gruß seiner Treuen an Friedrich August (II. von Sachsen) (1844)	choral
72	An Webers Grabe (1844)	choral
100	Ein Lustspiel in einem Akt (1868; prose draft)	Lustspiel
101	Wahlspruch für die Deutsche Feuerwehr (1869)	choral
102	Eine Kapitulation (1870; unfinished)	Lustspiel in antiker Manier
106	Kinderkatechismus zu Kosels Geburtstag (1873)	choral
112	Willkommen in Wahnfried, du heil'ger Christ (1877)	choral
113	Ihr Kinder, geschwinde, geschwinde (c. 1880)	choral
== Miscellaneous ==
18	Piano reduction of Haydn's Symphony No. 103 in E♭ major (1831; lost)	arrangement
34	Instrumentation of a cavatina from Bellini's Il pirata (1833; lost)	arrangement
46A	Bellini, Norma, retouching of orchestration (c. 1837)	arrangement
46B	Giacomo Meyerbeer: Robert der Teufel No. 18 (C) Cavatina transcribed for strings (c. 1838)	arrangement
46C	Carl Maria von Weber: Euryanthe No. 18 Hunting chorus and reorchestration (c. 1839)	arrangement
46D	Fromental Halévy: Le Guitarrero for several instruments	arrangement
46E	Arrangements of Halévy's La reine de Chypre	arrangement
46F	Daniel Auber: Zanetta ou Jouer avec le feu, Arrangement for flute and string trio, Suites No. 1 and 2	arrangement
47	Gioachino Rossini: Les soirées musicales, No. 12 Duet "Li Marinari", instrumentation (c. 1838)	arrangement
62A	Various composers, suites for the cornet à pistons (c. 1840; lost)	arrangement
62B	Arrangements from Gaetano Donizetti's opera La favorite (c. 1840-1842)	arrangement
62C	Henri Herz: Grande Fantaisie sur La Romanesca fameux air de danse du XVI siècle, Op. 111. Arrangement for piano four hands (c. 1840-1842)	arrangement
62D	Arrangements of Fromental Halévy's opera Le Guitarrero (c. 1840-42)	arrangement
62E	Arrangements of Fromental Halévy's opera in five acts La reine de Chypre (c. 1840-1842)	arrangement
62F	Arrangements of Daniel Auber's opera Zanetta for flute quartet (c. 1840-1842)	arrangement
74	Orchestration of Spontini's La vestale (c. 1844)	arrangement
77	Arrangement of Christoph Willibald Gluck's tragic opera Iphigénie en Aulide (c. 1846-47)	arrangement
79	Giovanni Pierluigi da Palestrina: Stabat mater (c. 1848)	arrangement
83	Arrangement of Mozart's Don Giovanni (1850; lost)	arrangement
87	Konzertschluß to the Overture to Gluck's Iphigenie in Aulis (c. 1854)	arrangement
109	Arrangement of the Waltz Wein, Weib und Gesang by Johann Strauss II (1875)	arrangement

== See also ==
- List of works for the stage by Richard Wagner

== Notes ==
Sources

- Deathridge J., Geck M. and Voss E. (1986). Wagner Werk-Verzeichnis (WWV): Verzeichnis der musikalischen Werke Richard Wagners und ihrer Quellen ("Catalogue of Wagner's Works: Catalogue of Musical Compositions by Richard Wagner and Their Sources"). Mainz, London, & New York: Schott Musik International.
- Kirby, F. E. (1997). Music for Piano: A Short History. Amadeus Press.
- Millington, Barry (2001). The Wagner Compendium: A Guide To Wagner's Life and Music. Thames & Hudson. ISBN 978-0500282748.
- Newman, Ernest (1949). Wagner Nights. London: Putnam & Co. (reprinted multiple times)
