= List of works for the stage by Richard Wagner =

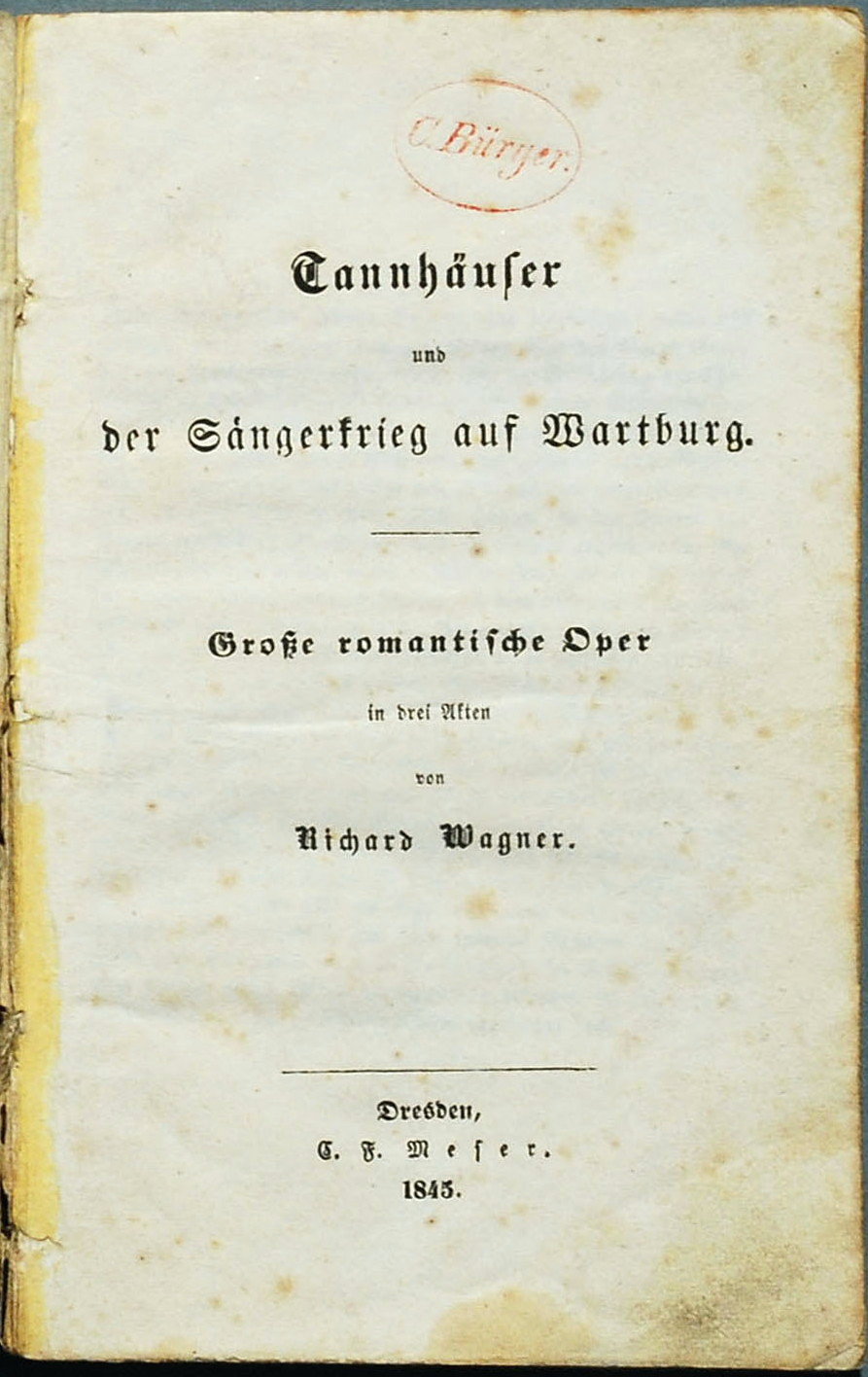
Front page of the Dresden score of Wagner's 1845 opera Tannhäuser

Richard Wagner's works for the stage, representing more than 50 years of creative life, comprise his 13 completed operas and a similar number of failed or abandoned projects. His first effort, begun when he was 13, was a prose drama, Leubald, but thereafter all his works were conceived as some form of musical drama. It has been suggested that Wagner's wish to add incidental music to Leubald, in the manner of Beethoven's treatment of Goethe's drama Egmont, may have been the initial stimulus that directed him to musical composition.

Wagner's musical education began in 1828, and a year later he was producing his earliest compositions, writing words and music, since lost, for his first opera attempt, Die Laune des Verliebten. During the subsequent decade he began several more opera projects, none of which was successful although two were completed and one was staged professionally. His first commercial success came in 1842 with Rienzi, by which time he had completed Der fliegende Holländer, in which for the first time he used the device of the leitmotiv, a characteristic that became a feature of all his later works.

After accepting the post of Kapellmeister at the Dresden court of the King of Saxony in February 1843, Wagner continued to compose operas and plan various large-scale projects. His political activities forced him to flee the city in 1849, beginning a long period of exile. In Zürich, his first refuge, he wrote the essay Die Kunst und die Revolution ("Art and the Revolution"), in which he introduced the concept of Gesamtkunstwerk (total work of art), or "drama-through-music". This idea was developed in the extended discourse Oper und Drama ("Opera and Drama"), 1850–51. A different form of verse-setting, which Wagner termed Versmelodie, was proposed, in which the music would grow out of the verse, this unification overriding such traditional operatic considerations as display arias written as showcases for the talents of individual singers. According to Wagner historian Robert Gutman: "The orchestra with its many tongues would take over the traditional operatic tasks of the chorus". Beginning with Das Rheingold (1853–54), the principles of Gesamtkunstwerk became the basis of all Wagner's stage work, in which, quoting Wagner chronicler Charles Osborne, "the drama presented on a conscious level by the words [...] would be pursued on a deeper, unconscious level in the orchestra."

== Librettist ==
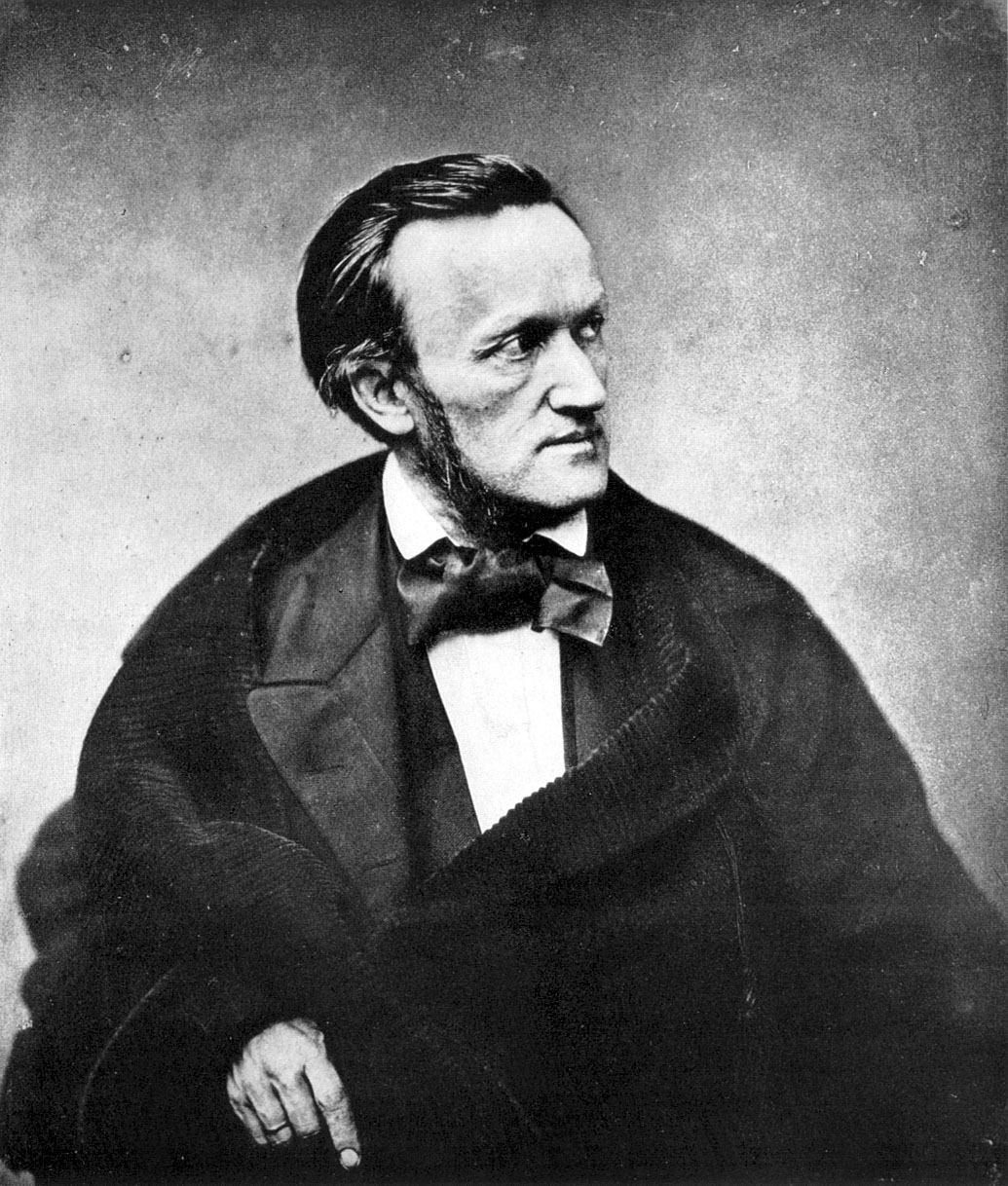
Richard Wagner in Paris, 1860

From his first attempt in the opera genre, Die Laune des Verliebten, Wagner became his own librettist and remained so throughout his creative career. His practice was to create music and text simultaneously; in biographer Robert Gutman's words: "as the music proceeded it drew forth the words." While working on Tannhäuser Wagner explained his technique in a letter, saying: "before starting to create a verse or even outline a scene, I must first feel intoxicated by the musical aroma of my subject."

== Cataloguing Wagner's works ==
Unlike the works of many composers, those of Richard Wagner were not identified by opus numbers, and no proper attempt to create a complete catalogue was made until the 1980s. In 1983 the Wagner scholar John Deathridge, in an article in The Musical Times, outlined the need for a reliable catalogue. Two years later, in conjunction with Martin Gech and Egon Voss, he produced Wagner-Werk-Verzeichnis, described by fellow-scholar Michael Saffle as "perhaps the single finest and most useful of all Wagner reference works." Each of Wagner's known works, whether finished or unfinished, is listed in a number sequence running from 1 to 113. The list includes all compositions and all prose drafts where the music is either lost or unwritten.

== List of works for the stage ==
Sketched work or incomplete work

WWV	Title	Genre and acts	Year of comp.	Première date	Place and theatre	Notes	Refs
1	Leubald	Trauerspiel (Note: "Tragic play"); 5 Acts	1827–28	9 August 1989	Bayreuth, Studiobühne Schützenhaus	Childhood attempt to write a grand tragedy based on Shakespearean themes. A version of the text exists, but no music survives.	
6	Die Laune des Verliebten (unfinished); English: The infatuated lover's caprice	Oper?	1829–30	Unperformed	–	Based on a play by Goethe. Neither text nor music survives.	
31	Die Hochzeit (unfinished); English: The Wedding	Oper	1832	13 February 1938 (fragments)	Leipzig, Neues Theater	Based on a story by J. G. G. Büsching	
32	Die Feen; English: The Fairies; Score	Große romantische Oper; 3 Acts	1833–34	29 June 1888	Munich, Hoftheater	A reworking of La donna serpente by Carlo Gozzi	
38	Das Liebesverbot; English: The Ban on Love; Score	Große komische Oper; 2 Acts	1835–36	29 March 1836	Magdeburg, Stadttheater	Loosely based on Shakespeare's Measure for Measure, and described (Osborne) as "a not very successful German imitation of Italian opera buffa."	
40	Die hohe Braut; English: The High-born Bride	Große Oper; 4 Acts	1836–42	1848 (date not recorded)	Prague	Libretto sketched by Wagner in 1836–37, completed in 1842, and eventually set to music by Jan Bedrich Kittl under the title Bianca und Giuseppe.	
48	Männerlist größer als Frauenlist, oder Die glückliche Bärenfamilie (unfinished); English: Men are more cunning than women or The Happy Bear family	komische Oper	1839	13 October 2007 (fragments)	London, Linbury Studio, Royal Opera House	Based on a tale from One Thousand and One Nights. The libretto was completed but only the first three numbers set to music. These were lost until 1994.	
49	Rienzi, der letzte der Tribunen; English: Rienzi, the Last of the Tribunes; Score	Große tragische Oper; 5 Acts	1839–40	20 October 1842	Dresden, Königliches Opernhaus	Based on the novel Rienzi by Edward Bulwer Lytton	
63	Der fliegende Holländer; English: The Flying Dutchman; Score	romantische Oper; 3 Acts	1841	2 January 1843	Dresden, Königliches Opernhaus	The orchestration was revised by Wagner several times. The opera is sometimes performed in a single act, without intermissions	
66	Die Sarazenin; English: The Saracen Woman	Oper; 5 Acts	1841–42	Unperformed	–	Libretto based on the character "Manfred" from Lord Byron's drama, not set to music	
68	Die Bergwerke zu Falun; English: The Mines of Falun	Oper; 3 Acts	1842	Unperformed	–	Sketch of opera, based on a story by E. T. A. Hoffmann	
70	Tannhäuser und der Sängerkrieg auf Wartburg (aka Tannhäuser); English: Tannhäuser and the Song Contest at Wartburg; Score (Dresden and Paris versions)	Große romantische Oper; 3 Acts	1843–45	19 October 1845; Revised version: 18 March 1861	Dresden, Königliches Opernhaus (1845); Paris, Opéra (1861)	Wagner did not produce a definitive edition of the score. The Paris premiere was disrupted by political and other demonstrations.	
75	Lohengrin Score	romantische Oper; 3 Acts	1846–48	28 August 1850	Weimar, Hoftheater	Loosely based on the German legend of Lohengrin, as presented in medieval verse including Wolfram von Eschenbach's Parzival	
76	Friedrich I	Oper? 5 Acts	1848–49	Unperformed	–	Project on Frederick I of Prussia, possibly intended as a music drama. No libretto or music written	
80	Jesus von Nazareth; English: Jesus of Nazareth	Oper? 5 Acts	1848–49	Unperformed	–	Prose draft only for libretto, no music written. Aspects of the sketch may have been used in the writing of Parsifal	
81	Achilleus; English: Achilles	Oper?	1848–49	Unperformed	–	Prose sketch, no music written	
82	Wieland der Schmied; English: Wieland the Smith	Heldenoper (Note: "Heroic opera"); 3 Acts	1849–50	Unperformed	–	Prose sketch for a heroic opera, offered to and rejected by Liszt and Berlioz. Eventually adapted by O. Schlemm and set by Ján Levoslav Bella (premiere Slovak National Theatre, Bratislava, 28 April 1926)	
86A	Das Rheingold; English: The Rhine Gold; Score	Bühnenfestspiel Vorabend (Note: "Stage festival play, preliminary evening"); 1 Act	1853–54	22 September 1869	Munich, Hofoper	First part of Der Ring des Nibelungen. First performance as part of complete Ring cycle: 13 August 1876, at Bayreuth Festspielhaus	
86B	Die Walküre; English: The Valkyrie; Score	Bühnenfestspiel erster Tag (Note: "Stage festival play, first day"); 3 Acts	1854–56	26 June 1870	Munich, Hofoper	Second part of Der Ring des Nibelungen. First performed as part of complete Ring cycle: 14 August 1876, at Bayreuth Festspielhaus	
89	Die Sieger; English: The Victors	Oper?	1856	Unperformed	–	Prose outline and music sketches for an opera on a Buddhist subject; some music may have been used in later works.	
90	Tristan und Isolde; English: Tristan and Isolde; Score	Handlung (Note: "Drama"); 3 Acts	1857–59	10 June 1865	Munich, Hofoper	Based in part on Gottfried von Strassburg's medieval epic, also believed to be an idealisation of Wagner's love for Mathilde Wesendonck	
96	Die Meistersinger von Nürnberg; English: The Mastersingers of Nuremberg; Score	Oper; 3 Acts	1861–67	21 June 1868	Munich, Hofoper	Wagner's only mature attempt at a comic opera, based on a draft originally written in 1845	
99	Luthers Hochzeit; English: Luther's Wedding	Oper?	1868	Unperformed	–	A sketch play/libretto about Martin Luther and his decision to marry Katherina von Bora	
86C	Siegfried; Score	Bühnenfestspiel zweiter Tag (Note: "Stage festival play, second day"); 3 Acts	1856–71	16 August 1876	Bayreuth Festspielhaus	Third part of Der Ring des Nibelungen. The composition was interrupted for 12 years between 1857 and 1869.	
86D	Götterdämmerung; English: Twilight of the Gods; Score	Bühnenfestspiel dritter Tag (Note: "Stage festival play, third day"); 3 Acts	1871–74	17 August 1876	Bayreuth Festspielhaus	Fourth part of Der Ring des Nibelungen.	
102	Eine Kapitulation; English: A Capitulation	Lustspiel in antiker Manier (Note: "Comedy in antique style")	1871	Unperformed	–	A farce based on the siege of Paris, 1870. Wagner unsuccessfully asked Hans Richter to set it to music	
111	Parsifal; Score	Bühnenweihfestspiel (Note: "Consecrated stage festival play"); 3 Acts	1877–82	26 July 1882	Bayreuth Festspielhaus	Under an agreement between Wagner and King Ludwig, Parsifal was only to be performed at Bayreuth, "never desecrated by contact with any profane stage".	

Translation:

== See also ==
- Bayreuth canon
- List of compositions by Richard Wagner

== List of sources ==
=== General ===
- Bassett, Peter (2004). The Nibelung's Ring. Adelaide: Wakefield Press. ISBN 1-86254-624-X.
- Borchmeyer, Dieter (2003). Daphne Ellis (ed.). Drama and the World of Richard Wagner. Princeton, New Jersey: Princeton University Press. ISBN 0-691-11497-8.
- Elschek, Oskár (ed.) (2003): A History of Slovak Music, Veda, Bratislava. ISBN 80-224-0724-0
- Gutman, Robert W. (1971): Richard Wagner: The Man, His Mind and His Music, Penguin Books, London ISBN 0-14-021168-3
- Kennedy, Michael and Joyce Bourne (2007): The Concise Oxford Dictionary of Music, Oxford University Press, Oxford, ISBN 0-19-920383-0
- Millington, Barry; Deathridge, John; Dahlhaus, Carl; Bailey (2001). "Wagner, (Wilhelm) Richard". Grove Music Online (8th ed.). Oxford University Press. doi:10.1093/gmo/9781561592630.article.6002278269. ISBN 978-1-56159-263-0. (subscription, Wikilibrary access, or UK public library membership required) (subscription required)
- Millington, Barry (Spring 2005). "After the Revolution: The Ring in the Light of Wagner's Dresden and Zurich Projects". University of Toronto Quarterly. 74 (2): 677–692. doi:10.3138/utq.74.2.677. ISSN 0042-0247 – via Project Muse. (subscription required)
- Osborne, Charles (1992): The Complete Operas of Wagner, Victor Gollancz, London, ISBN 0-575-05380-1
- Pritchard, Jim (2007): "Seen and Heard Opera Review: Wagner Rarities", MusicWeb International. Retrieved on 26 March 2009
- "Richard Wagner" (1996) in Harvard Biographical Dictionary of Music. Harvard University Press, Cambridge, Massachusetts Retrieved on 24 March 2009
- Saffle, Michael (2002): Richard Wagner: A Guide to Research, Taylor & Francis, London. ISBN 0-8240-5695-7 Retrieved on 25 March 2009
- "Wagner Rarities" (2007), MusicalCriticism.com. Retrieved 25 March 2009
