= Ignaz von Mosel =

Austrian statesman and composer (1772–1844)

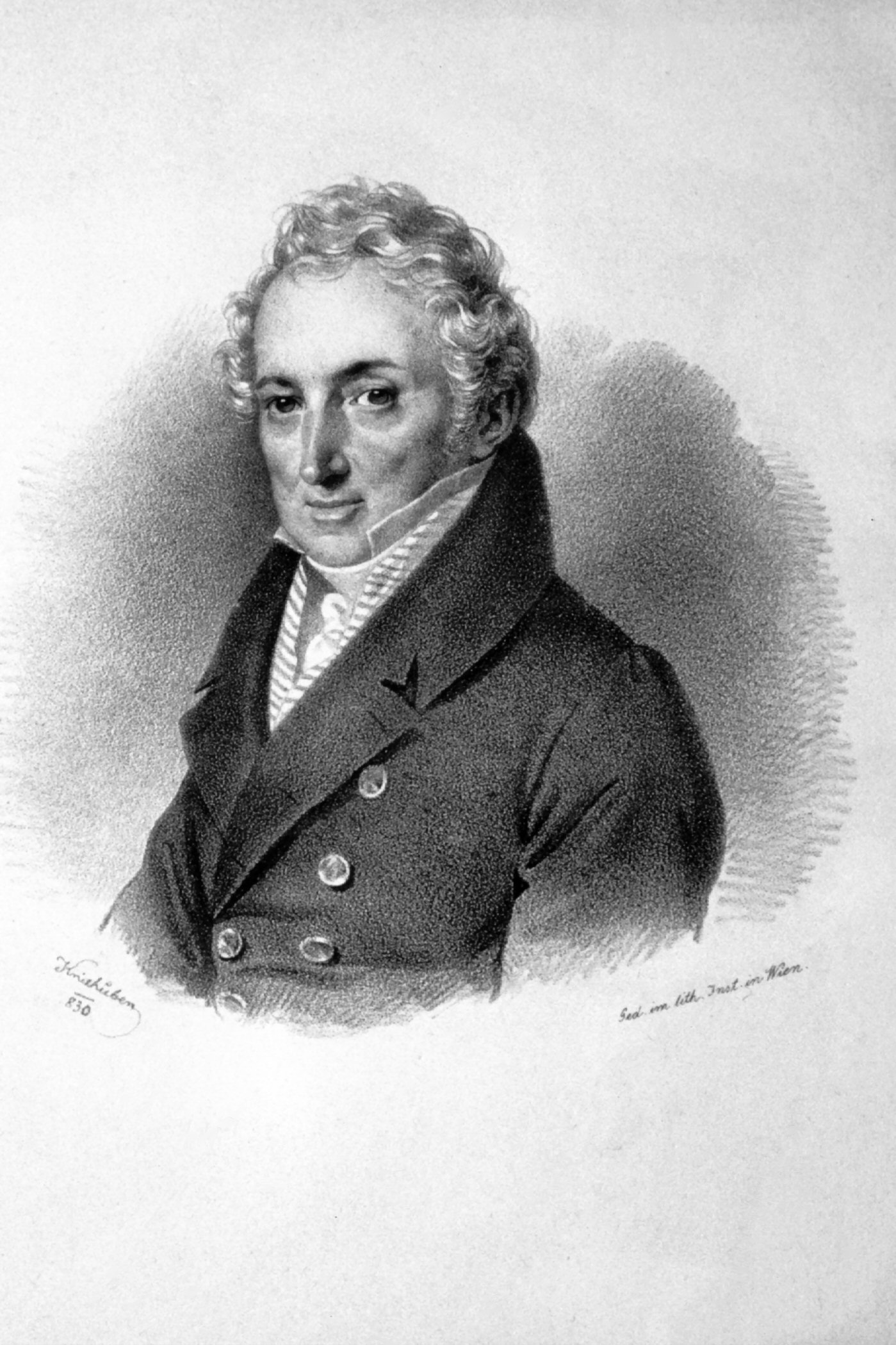
Ignaz von Mosel, lithograph by Josef Kriehuber, 1830

Ignaz (Franz) von Mosel (1 April 1772 – 8 April 1844) was an Austrian court official, composer and music writer.

== Life ==
Born in Vienna, Mosel entered the royal Bancal-Staatsbuchhaltung (State Bank Bookkeepers) in 1797, later joining the Obersthofmeisteramt and finally the royal Hofrath. He became the first 'kustos' of the court library. In 1812 he was the first conductor in Vienna to use a baton, whilst conducting a memorial concert with Carl Steinacker. He conducted and organized the Gesellschaft der Musikfreunde's music festivals (set up by Andreas Streicher) from 1812 to 1816, including the Handel concerts at the Winterreitschule, which ultimately led to the foundation of the society and its choir, which developed into the Wiener Singverein.

On 18 July 1818 he was raised to the nobility and from 1820 he served as vice-director of the court theatre, though he had little influence on the Hofoper after Domenico Barbaja took it over. From 1821 he was vice-director of the Hofbibliothek and from 1829 its director. He also bore the title of 'hofrat' or court councilor.

== Influence ==
An influential figure in the musical life of Vormärz-era Vienna, he was a friend of the Schubert Circle. He composed mainly vocal works and was mainly important as a scholarly music writer and reviewer (it was he who wrote the first scholarly work on Mozart's Requiem). He also personally supported the Wiener Sängerknaben.

A street in Vienna's Favoriten district was named the 'Moselgasse' after him in 1974. A memorial plaque also stands on his family tomb in the Hietzing Cemetery (Gr. 44 Nr. 46).

== Works ==
=== Musical compositions ===
- Die Feuerprobe. Opera (1812)
- Salem. Lyrical tragedy (1813, Libretto: Ignaz Franz Castelli)
- Cyrus und Astyages. Opera (1818, Libretto: Matthäus von Collin after Pietro Metastasio)
- Die Horatier (1843)
- Lieder
- Psalms
- Choral works
- Music for plays
- Orchestral works
- Marches

=== Books ===
- Versuch einer Aesthetik des dramatischen Tonsatzes. Wien 1813.
- Über das Leben und die Werke des Anton Salieri. Wallishausser: Wien, 1827 (Reprint: Bock: Bad Honnef, 1999).
- Geschichte der k.k. Hofbibliothek zu Wien. Beck, Wien 1835.
- Über die Originalpartitur des Requiems von Wolfgang Amadeus Mozart. A. Strauß's sel. Witwe, Wien 1839.
- Nekrolog des großen Tonsetzers, Herrn Abbé Maximilian Stadler. Braumüller, Wien 1864.

=== Edited editions ===
- G. F. Händel (Ed.: Mozart/Mosel): Timotheus oder die Gewalt der Musik (Concentus Musicus Wien, Wiener Singverein – Nikolaus Harnoncourt)

== Bibliography ==
- https://de.wikisource.org/wiki/BLK%C3%96:Mosel,_Ignaz_Franz_Edler_von
- Theophil Antonicek: Ignaz von Mosel (1772–1844). Biographie und Beziehungen zu den Zeitgenossen. Dissertation, Wien 1962
- Felix Czeike: Historisches Lexikon Wien Bd. 4. Kremayr & Scheriau, Wien 1995
- Till Gerrit Waidelich: Das K. K. Hofburgtheater, die Vorstadtbühnen und die unendliche Vielfalt der Gestaltung von Schauspielmusik in Wien. In: Ursula Kramer (editor): Theater mit Musik. 400 Jahre Schauspielmusik im europäischen Theater. Bedingungen – Strategien – Wahrnehmungen, p. 93–117.
