= Love feast (disambiguation) =

The love feast is an agape feast, a Christian ritual meal.

Love feast may also refer to:

- Das Liebesmahl der Apostel (Love-feast of the Apostles), a 1843 work by Richard Wagner about the ritual meal
- Liebesmahl, a musical motif surrounding the love-feast in Wagner's opera Parsifal

== See also ==
- Eucharist, a Christian rite to commemorate the Last Supper of Jesus Christ
- Esbat, a Wican coven meeting described as a "love feast"
- Feast of Love, a 2007 American drama film
