= Wesendonck Lieder =

Set of five songs by Richard Wagner

- Lieder by Richard Wagner
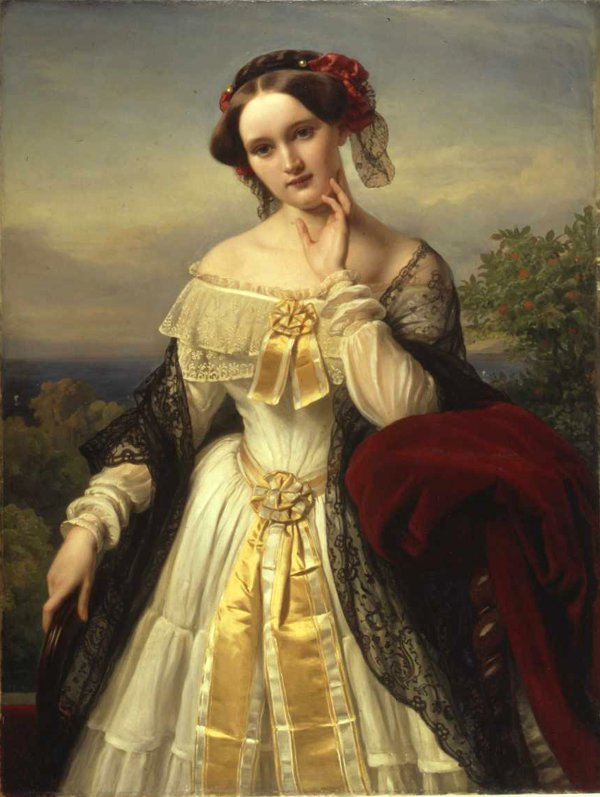
- Portrait of Mathilde Wesendonck (1850) by Karl Ferdinand Sohn
- Catalogue: WWV 91
- Text: Poems by Mathilde Wesendonck
- Language: German
- Composed: 1857–1858
- Scoring: voice and piano

Wesendonck Lieder, WWV 91, is the common name of a set of five songs for female voice and piano by Richard Wagner, Fünf Gedichte für eine Frauenstimme (Five Poems for a Female Voice). He set five poems by Mathilde Wesendonck while he was working on his opera Tristan und Isolde. The songs, together with the Siegfried Idyll, are the two non-operatic works by Wagner most regularly performed.

== History ==
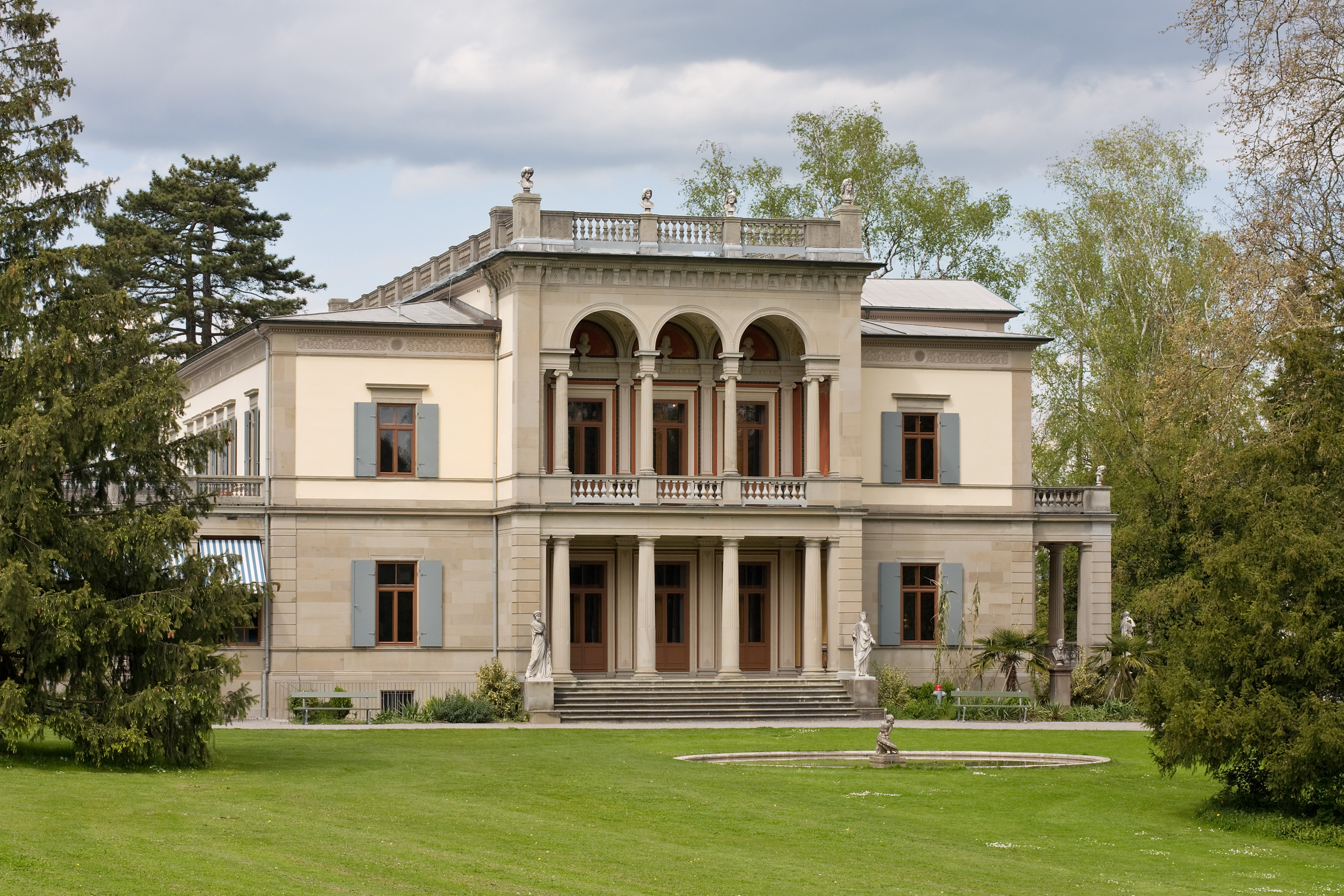
Villa Wesendonck, Zürich

The songs are settings of poems by Mathilde Wesendonck, the wife of one of Richard Wagner's patrons. Wagner had become acquainted with Otto Wesendonck in Zürich, where he had fled on his escape from Saxony after the May Uprising in Dresden in 1849. For a time Wagner and his wife Minna lived together in the Asyl (German for Asylum in the sense of "sanctuary"), a small cottage on the Wesendonck estate. It is sometimes claimed that Wagner and Mathilde had a love affair; in any case, the situation and mutual infatuation certainly contributed to the intensity in the conception of Tristan und Isolde.

Wagner sold the settings to the publisher Schott in 1860 for 1000 francs. The first published version (1862) was titled Fünf Gedichte für eine Frauenstimme (Five poems for a female voice), and the first performance was given at the publisher's residence in Mainz, by the soprano Emilie Genast, accompanied by Hans von Bülow. No name was given for the author of the texts at the first publication; it was not publicly revealed until after Mathilde's death (1902). The present order of the songs appears for the first time in the published version, and this has raised doubts as to whether the sequence is a genuine song cycle, or should be regarded simply as a collection of individual pieces.

== The songs ==
5. "Träume"
Orchestral version with Ernestine Schumann-Heink, 1911

1. "Der Engel" ("The Angel"), composed November 1857
2. "Stehe still!" ("Be still!"), composed February 1858
3. "Im Treibhaus – Studie zu Tristan und Isolde" ("In the Greenhouse"), composed May 1858
4. "Schmerzen" ("Sorrows"), composed December 1857
5. "Träume – Studie zu Tristan und Isolde" ("Dreams"), composed December 1857

Wagner himself called two of the songs "studies" for Tristan und Isolde, using for the first time certain musical ideas that are later developed in the opera. In "Träume" can be heard the roots of the love duet in Act 2, while "Im Treibhaus" (the last of the five to be composed) uses music later developed extensively for the prelude to Act 3.

== Versions ==
Wagner wrote the songs for female voice and piano alone but also orchestrated "Träume" for chamber forces, with violin taking the voice part, for a performance beneath Mathilde's window on her birthday, 23 December 1857.

Men have also sung them. Lauritz Melchior recorded "Schmerzen" and "Träume" for HMV in 1923; "Der Engel" has been recorded by tenors Franco Corelli (in French), Plácido Domingo, Jonas Kaufmann and Andrea Bocelli, and by the bass Paata Burchuladze. A few men have performed the whole cycle, including René Kollo and, in a 2024 filmed concert, Michael Spyres. Tenor Stuart Skelton recorded the cycle in 2018, as did Christoph Prégardien in 2019.

The orchestration of all five songs was completed for large orchestra by Felix Mottl, the Austrian conductor, on 3 August 1893. In 1972 the Italian composer Vieri Tosatti entirely re-orchestrated the songs. In 1976 the German composer Hans Werner Henze produced a chamber version for the songs; each of the players has a separate part, with some very unusual wind registration. Clytus Gottwald arranged "Im Treibhaus" and "Träume" for 16-voice choir a cappella in 2004 as Zwei Studien zu "Tristan und Isolde". In 2013 (the bicentennial of Wagner's birth) the French composer Alain Bonardi released a new version for voice, piano, clarinet and cello, including instrumental interludes with oriental resonant percussions. In the same year, the Chinese-British composer Jeffrey Ching premiered his Wesendonck Sonata for voice, viola (or cello), and piano. In 2014 Aurélien Bello made an orchestration for chamber orchestra as used in the Siegfried Idyll (and a harp ad libitum). French composer Christophe Looten wrote a transcription for voice and string quartet (Théâtre des Champs-Élysées, Paris, March 2015). A version of the lieder with the original piano accompaniment arranged for string orchestra by David Angell was premiered by the Bourbaki Ensemble in Sydney, Australia, in January 2022. Composer Paolo Fradiani arranged a version for chamber ensemble of 11 players (2022).
