= James Francis Brown =

British composer

- Born: 7 December 1969 (age 56); London, England
- Education: Royal Academy of Music
- Occupation: Composer

James Francis Brown (born 7 December 1969) is an English composer. He studied composition with the Viennese émigré Hans Heimler (a pupil of Alban Berg) and then at the Royal Academy of Music, London.

== Career ==
Francis Brown's significant chamber works include sonatas for Piano (1994), for Viola (1995), the String Trio (commissioned by the Leopold String Trio, 1996) and a Piano Quartet (2003). Larger concert works include the Fantasy for Violin and Orchestra (premiered by Jack Liebeck and the English Chamber Orchestra at the Barbican Centre in 2001), the Sinfonietta, commissioned by Faber Music and premiered at the Queen Elizabeth Hall in 2002 by the London Chamber Orchestra, Trio Concertante for string trio and orchestra (2006) and the Clarinet Concerto (2008). The Shakespeare-inspired ‘Prospero’s Isle’ (2006), is a work for cello and piano that was subsequently expanded and orchestrated to form a symphonic tone poem, arranged for performance in St Petersburg in 2007. Brown's String Quartet was written in 2010 and premiered at a London Chamber Music Society concert that same year. Songs of Nature and Farewell is written for the combination of Soprano, Flute, Cello, and piano (after the composer Maurice Ravel's Chansons Madécasses)

As an arranger he reconstructed and orchestrated sketches for Wagner's projected opera 'Männerlist größer als Frauenlist' for the Royal Opera House in 2007 and arranged Wagner's Siegfried Idyll for the 2008 City of London Festival. His film scores include the acclaimed short film “The Clap” (Breakthru Films, 2005).

James Francis Brown was awarded a five-year NESTA fellowship in 2003, and was the first composer-in-residence at the International Musicians Seminar, Prussia Cove, in 2006. In 2009 he was Composer in Residence at the Ulverston Festival in England's Lake District.

His concert work is often linked with a group of British composers called 'Music Haven', not a school as such, but a collection of composers (cf. the French 'Les Six' or the British 'Manchester School', from the early and late twentieth-century respectively), mostly London-based and with broadly similar interests and aesthetic outlook, reflecting sympathies for British masters such as Britten and Tippett and the great music of the First Viennese School, especially Haydn and Beethoven, as well as the Scandinavian influences of Sibelius and Nielsen. The group includes Peter Fribbins, Northern Irish-born Alan Mills, Matthew Taylor, John Hawkins, Geoff Palmer, and more peripherally two older British composers, David Matthews and by association, John McCabe CBE. The set of piano pieces 'Seven Haydn Fantasies for John McCabe' - each composed by a different composer and published in 2009 on the occasion of the latter's 70th birthday - is in many ways typical of the group's work.

== Recordings ==
- Prospero's Isle - Guild (GMCD 7354). Piano Quartet, Violin Sonata, Prospero's Isle, String Trio. Performed by Tamás András (violin), Sarah-Jane Bradley (viola), Gemma Rosefield (cello), Katya Apekisheva (piano); Jack Liebeck (violin), Katya Apekisheva (piano); Gemma Rosefield (cello), Nicola Eimer (piano); Jack Liebeck (violin), Sarah-Jane Bradley (viola), Gemma Rosefield (cello).
- ‘Words’ from A Garland for Presteigne. Metronome Records (METCD 1065)

== Notable works ==
=== Orchestral ===
- Cantilena for string orchestra (1991)
- Sinfonietta (2000, revised 2007)
- Fantasy for Violin and Orchestra (2001)
- Down Ampney Variation (2004)
- Trio Concertante (2006)
- Prospero's Isle - symphonic poem version (2006, revised 2007)
- Lost Lanes, Shadow Groves - Clarinet Concerto (2008)
- Heartwood Wilding (2022)

=== Chamber ===
- Arioso for viola and piano (also version for clarinet and piano) (1991)
- Viola Sonata (1995)
- Lento flessibile for viola and piano (1995)
- String Trio (1996)
- Violin Sonata (2001, revised 2003)
- Piano quartet (2004)
- Prospero's Isle for cello and piano (2006)
- Two Wordsworth Sonnets (2009)
- Piano Trio (2010)
- String Quartet (2010)
- A Dream and a Dance for flute, clarinet, harp, and string quartet (2012–13)
- Heralds of Good Fortune for wind quintet (with cor anglais and basset horn doubling the oboe and clarinet in the middle movement)
- The Hart’s Grace for violin and piano (2016)

=== Keyboard ===
- Ingworth (1986)
- Piano Sonata (1990)
- The Silent Hour (1999)
- Oh Let the Heart Beat High with Bliss (2005)
- Toccatina for Solo Piano (2007)
- Fantasy Rondo after Haydn - part of the Haydn Fantasies for John McCabe compilation (2009)
- Dunwich Bells part of the Reflections on Debussy (2012)
- Rigaudon part of the Le tombeau de Rachmaninov compilation (2015)
