= Paolo Fradiani =

Italian classical composer

Paolo Fradiani is an Italian classical composer and professor.

== Biography and career ==
Born in Avezzano, Italy in 1984, studied music at Conservatoire of Music "Alfredo Casella" in L'Aquila and at Staatliche Hochschule für Musik und Darstellende Kunst in Mannheim. He studied music composition with Mauro Cardi at L'Aquila Conservatoire and with Sidney Corbett at the Mannheim Musikhochschule; studied jazz double bass with Luca Bulgarelli at L'Aquila Conservatoire.

His works have been performed by relevant orchestras, ensembles and soloists in Australia, Austria, Belgium, Canada, China, Croatia, Denmark, Finland, France, Germany, Hungary, Italy, Japan, Netherlands, Norway, Poland, South Korea, Spain, Sweden, Switzerland, Turkey, United Kingdom and USA including Berliner Philharmoniker soloists; and was also broadcast on the Dutch national radio station NPO Radio 4 and to the German SR 2 Kulturradio; and television broadcasters Arte TV (Germany/France), Podium 19 (Belgium) and Regio TV Bodensee (Germany).

Fradiani has received several prizes by Italian Ministry of Education and Italian Ministry of Cultural Heritage and Activities and Tourism. In 2017 has been composer in residence at Società Aquilana dei Concerti “B. Barattelli”.

He also composed the music for the silent film by Charles Bowers “Now You Tell One” (1926) for the Franco-German television Arte.

His works have been published by 2eleven edition musiQ, Da Vinci Edition, Donemus Publishing, Edition Margaux and Universal Edition.

He is currently permanent professor of composition at Conservatorio statale di musica "Nino Rota" in Monopoli.

== Selected works ==
Compositions

- Acropolis, for ensemble or chamber orchestra
- Arabesque, for violoncello
- Archetypi, for orchestra
- Butterfly, Butterfly, for children's choir & ensemble
- Capriccio, for violin
- Cello Concerto – for the innocent victims of all wars, for violoncello and strings
- Delphi's Muse, for harp
- Kindermusik, for piano
- Kiş, for children's choir & ensemble
- Luz, for voice and piano
- Nocturne, for piano
- Nocturne II, for piano
- Orationem, for clarinet and organ
- Peace Suite, for violin and violoncello
- Prelude & Fugue "The Dark Age", for string orchestra
- Psalm VIII, for mezzo-soprano, bass and organ
- Sfere di Luce in Movimento su Sfondo Nero, for string quartet
- Spirali, for guitar
- The Rite Without Spring – Music for environmental sustainability, for chamber orchestra
- Three Medieval Dances, for sopranino recorder
- Tre Aforismi, for piano
- Violin Concerto, for violin and orchestra

Ballet

- Acropolis, for speaker, dancers and ensemble or chamber orchestra

Opera

- Casa Rossini, for soprano, bass, actor and ensemble

Arrangements

- Claude Debussy – Golliwogg's Cakewalk, for ensemble or chamber orchestra
- Claude Debussy – Prélude à l'après-midi d'un faune, for ensemble or chamber orchestra
- Gabriel Fauré – Pavane Op. 50, for ensemble or chamber orchestra
- Gustav Mahler – Kindertotenlieder, for voice and ensemble or chamber orchestra
- Jules Massenet – Méditation, for violin and ensemble or chamber orchestra
- Giacomo Puccini – Intermezzo Act III from Manon Lescaut, forensemble or chamber orchestra or orchestra
- Giacomo Puccini – Quando me’n vo’ from La Bohème, for soprano and ensemble or chamber orchestra
- Maurice Ravel – Ma Mère l'Oye, for ensemble or chamber orchestra
- Maurice Ravel – Pavane pour une infante défunte, for ensemble or chamber orchestra
- Maurice Ravel – Shéhérazade, for voice and ensemble or chamber orchestra
- Nikolai Rimsky-Korsakov – Scheherazade, for ensemble or chamber orchestra
- Gioachino Rossini – Ouverture from La gazza ladra, for ensemble or chamber orchestra
- Satie Erik – Gymnopédie No.1, for ensemble or chamber orchestra
- Satie Erik – Gymnopédie No.3, for ensemble or chamber orchestra
- Giuseppe Verdi – E’ Strano! Sempre Libera from La Traviata, for soprano and ensemble or chamber orchestra
- Giuseppe Verdi – Sinfonia from I vespri siciliani (Les vêpres siciliennes), for ensemble or chamber orchestra
- Richard Wagner - Wesendonck Lieder, for voice and ensemble or chamber orchestra
