= Polonia (Wagner) =

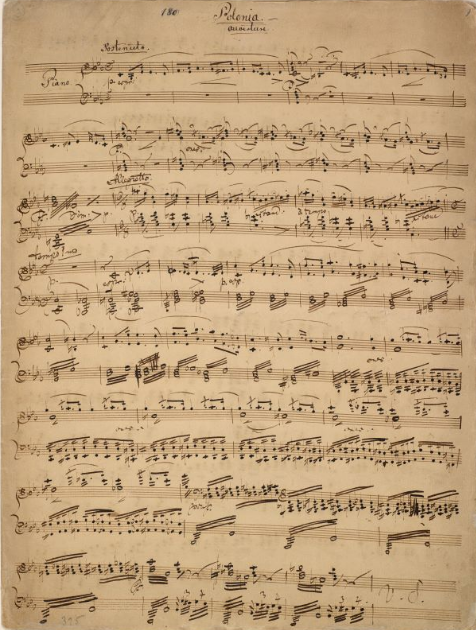
Polonia Overture: holograph first page of Wagner's arrangement for piano

Polonia (WWV 39) is a concert overture written by Richard Wagner. Wagner completed Polonia in 1836, although it has been suggested that it may have been drafted as early as 1832.

Wagner states that Polonia resulted from a "dreamlike evening" in Leipzig when he heard uninterrupted Polish songs, including the Polish national anthem Poland Is Not Yet Lost at a celebration of May 3rd Constitution Day in 1832. He composed the work later in Berlin in May–July 1836, and gave its first performance in Königsberg the following winter. The work, which is in sonata form, contains references to Polish folksong.

Wagner apparently took the manuscript of the score with him to Paris in 1839. He thought it had been lost during his visit, but it was returned to him by the conductor Jules Pasdeloup in 1869. Discussing the overture with his wife Cosima on Christmas Day 1881, Wagner opined that "with a military band for the people, as I thought of everything at the time, it would have sounded splendid and made a great effect."

Wagner's biographer Ernest Newman wrote that the overture was "shapeless and frothy...the oddest mixture of a pseudo-Polish idiom and the cheap assertive melody of Rienzi". The writer Adrian Corleonis has commented that "Polonia's coarse-grained excitement, which may at first seem audacious, looms as merely clumsy ... well before its run halfway through its dozen-minute course, the curious compulsion to revisit lame material having something about it of the boorish, drunken frat boy imagining that he's the life of the party".

The composer's manuscript of his piano arrangement of the score, which he made in 1840, is in the Stefan Zweig Collection at the British Library. Zweig acquired the manuscript from a dealer in Vienna in 1937.
