= Peter Fribbins =

British composer (born 1969)

- Born: 4 June 1969 (age 57); London, England
- Education: Royal Academy of Music
- Occupation: Composer

Peter Fribbins (born 4 June 1969) is a British composer. He studied music at the Royal Academy of Music, Royal Holloway and Nottingham universities, and composition with Hans Werner Henze in London and Italy.

== Work ==
A number of his key works are literary-inspired, and much of his music is for strings, notable exceptions being the early wind quintet 'In Xanadu' from 1992 (after Coleridge), 'Porphyria's Lover' (1999) for flute and piano (after Browning), and the clarinet and piano '...That Which Echoes in Eternity' (after lines from Dante's Divine Comedy). Of his two string quartets, the first is subtitled 'I Have the Serpent Brought' after lines by John Donne from his poem 'Twicknam Garden', and the second (2006) commissioned by the Chilingirian Quartet (Levon Chilingirian), subtitled 'After Cromer' since much of the thematic material is derived from the English hymn of the same name. Other chamber works for strings include two piano trios – the first, more substantial one premiered in Vienna in 2004, and the latter, an evocative single-movement piece (2007) entitled 'Softly, in the Dusk...' after the poem 'Piano' by D. H. Lawrence – a Cello Sonata commissioned by Raphael Wallfisch and John York (2005) and the Quintet for Clarinet and Strings (2002). Larger scale works include the Piano Concerto (2010), which is subtitled 'The Moving Finger Writes'; a quotation from FitzGerald's translation of The Rubáiyát of Omar Khayyám, and the Violin Concerto (2015) commissioned by the French violinist Philippe Graffin. There are also songs and various smaller instrumental works.

Peter Fribbins is also Director of Music at Middlesex University, London (since 2004) and Artistic Director of the long-established series of Sunday London Chamber Music Society Concerts, formerly at Conway Hall and resident at Kings Place since 2008.

His concert work is often linked with a group of British composers called 'Music Haven', not a school as such, but a collection of composers (cf. the French 'Les Six' or the British 'Manchester School', from the early and late twentieth-century respectively), mostly London-based and with broadly similar interests and aesthetic outlook, reflecting sympathies for British masters such as Britten and Tippett and the music of the First Viennese School, especially Haydn and Beethoven, as well as the Scandinavian influences of Sibelius and Nielsen. The group includes James Francis Brown, Northern Irish-born Alan Mills, Matthew Taylor, John Hawkins, Geoff Palmer, and more peripherally two older British composers, David Matthews and by association, John McCabe CBE. The set of piano pieces 'Seven Haydn Fantasies for John McCabe' – each composed by a different composer and published in 2009 on the occasion of the latter's 70th birthday – is in many ways typical of the group's work.

== Recordings ==
Sources:

- Dances, Elegies & Epitaphs – Resonus (RES 10193). Capriccio: Abide with Me, Concerto for Violin & Orchestra, 'In Xanadu' for Wind Quintet, Soliloquies for Trumpet & Strings. Performed by Philippe Graffin (violin), Christopher Hart (trumpet) and the Royal Scottish National Orchestra, conducted by Robertas Šervenikas
- Dances & Laments – Guild (GMCD 7397). The Zong Affair, Dances & Laments, '...that which echoes in eternity' Porphyria's Lover, 'Softly, in the Dusk', Chorale Prelude and fugue on the Hymn Tune 'Cromer'. Performed by the Turner Ensemble; Philippe Graffin (violin) and Henri Demarquette; Pál Banda (cello) & Mine Dogantan-Dack (piano), Nancy Ruffer (flute) and Helen Crayford (piano); Rosamunde Piano Trio; Michael Frith
- The Moving Finger Writes – Guild (GMCD 7381). String Quartet No.2 'After Cromer', A Haydn Prelude, Piano Concerto, Fantasias for Viola and Piano Nos. 1–2. Performed by the Chilingirian Quartet; Anthony Hewitt; Diana Brekalo, the Royal Philharmonic Orchestra, and Robertas Šervenikas; Sarah-Jane Bradley and Anthony Hewitt
- I Have the Serpent Brought – Guild (GMCD 7343). String Quartet No.1 'I Have the Serpent Brought', Piano Trio, Clarinet Quintet, Cello Sonata. Performed by the Allegri Quartet, Angell Piano Trio, Raphael Wallfisch (cello), John York (piano) and James Campbell (clarinets).

== Notable works ==
=== Orchestral ===
- Cappriccio for Orchestra (2005–7)
- Piano Concerto (2010)
- Violin Concerto (2015)
- Soliloquies for Trumpet & Strings (2016)
- Cello Concerto (2019)

=== Chamber ===
- Quintet for Clarinet and Strings (2002)
- String Quartet No. 1 – I Have the Serpent Brought (1990–98, revised 2002-4)
- Concertino for Seven (2002–3)
- That which echoes in eternity for violin and piano; also version for 'cello and piano (2002–3)
- Piano Trio (2003–4)
- Sonata for Cello and Piano (2004–5)
- String Quartet No. 2 After Cromer (2006)
- Softly, in the Dusk for Piano Trio (2006–7)
- Dances & Laments for Violin and Cello (2007–10)
- Fantasias for Viola and Piano (2007 & 2011)
- Variation on a Burns Air for piano quartet (2009)
- The Zong Affair for Septet (2011)
- Sonata for solo Violin (2011–12)

=== Wind / vocal ===
- Inferno for Clarinet and Piano (1990–91)
- In Xanadu for Wind Quintet (1991)
- Three Songs for Soprano and Piano (1991–98)
- Porphyria's Lover for Flute and Piano (1994–96)
- I Travelled Among Unknown Men for Soprano and Piano (2012)
- Brass Quintet (2017)

=== Piano / keyboard ===
- Nocturne (1994)
- Prelude and Fugue On Cromer for Organ / Piano (2011)
- A Haydn Prelude for John McCabe (2009)
- L'extase des jets d'eau – an Aquarelle for Solo Piano (2012)
