= Christoph-Hellmut Mahling =

German musicologist and lecturer

Christoph-Hellmut Mahling (25 May 1932 – 13 February 2012) was a German musicologist and lecturer at various universities.

== Life and career ==
Born in Berlin, Mahling studied musicology by Walter Gerstenberg, Georg Reichert, Joseph Müller-Blattau, and Walter Salmen at the University of Tübingen and the Saarland University (Saarbrücken) from 1957 to 1962.

In 1962 he obtained his doctorate of phil. (Dissertation: Studien zur Geschichte des Opernchors) and became assistant at the Musicological Institute of the Saarland University in 1963. In 1972, he won his habilitation there with Walter Wiora for the subject Musicology (Habil.-Schrift: Orchester und Orchester-Musiker in Deutschland von 1700 bis 1850). In the same year he was appointed Scientific Councilor and Professor. Since 1981 he had a professorship at the Johannes Gutenberg University Mainz; until March 2000 he was director of the musicological institute there. From 1987 to 1992 Mahling was president of the International Musicological Society. Mahling also acted as one of the leading pioneers of a complete edition of the letters of Gaspare Spontini, which have been published by Hainholz Verlag since 2013 in Göttingen.

Mahling died in Mainz at age 79.

== Selected publications ==
- Richard Wagner und seine "Lehrmeister" : Bericht der Tagung am Musikwissenschaftlichen Institut der Johannes-Gutenberg-Universität Mainz, 6./7. June 1997; Egon Voss zum 60. Geburtstag / edited by Christoph-Hellmut Mahling [...]. Mainz: Are-Musik-Verl., 1999
- Zur Harmoniemusik und ihrer Geschichte / Villa Musica. Hrsg. von Christoph-Hellmut Mahling, Kristina Pfarr, Karl Böhmer. Colloquium. Villa Musica; 2 (Schloß Engers, Neuwied): 1998.10.30-31. Mainz: Villa Musica, c 1999
- Musiktheater im Spannungsfeld zwischen Tradition und Experiment (1960 bis 1980) / edited by Christoph-Hellmut Mahling and Kristina Pfarr. Tutzing: Schneider, 2002
- Aspekte historischer und systematischer Musikforschung: zur Symphonie im 19. Jahrhundert, zu Fragen der Musiktheorie, der Wahrnehmung von Musik und anderes; [Jahrestagung der Gesellschaft für Musikforschung, ... 1997 an der Johannes-Gutenberg-Universität Mainz ...] / editors Christoph-Hellmut Mahling and Kristina Pfarr. Mainz: Are-Ed., 2002
- Kammermusik an Rhein und Main: Beiträge zur Geschichte des Streichquartetts; Christoph-Hellmut Mahling zum 75. Geburtstag / edited by Kristina Pfarr. Unter Mitwirkung des Jubilars. Mainz: Villa Musica Rheinland-Pfalz, 2007
- Kammermusik im Übergang vom Barock zur Klassik / edited by Christoph-Hellmut Mahling. Mainz: Villa Musica, 2009
- Kurmusik in Kreuznach und Münster am Stein im 19. und frühen 20. Jahrhundert / Heinz Koch. Posthum herausgegeben von Wolfgang Birtel und Christoph-Hellmut Mahling. Bad Kreuznach: Kreisverwaltung, 2009
- Musiker auf Reisen: Beiträge zum Kulturtransfer im 18. und 19. Jahrhundert / im Auftrag der Deutschen Mozartstadt Augsburg published by Christoph-Hellmut Mahling. - Augsburg: Wißner, 2011

== Festschriften ==
- Axel Beer, Wolfgang Ruf and Kristina Pfarr (editors): Festschrift Christoph-Hellmut Mahling zum 65. Geburtstag. (Mainzer Studien zur Musikwissenschaft, 37) 2nd volume – Tutzing: Hans Schneider 1997. [with pictures and note examples] XXIII, 1618 p. 8°
- Wolfgang Birtel (Author), Ursula Kramer (editors): Chöre und Chorisches Singen: Festschrift für Christoph-Hellmut Mahling zum 75. Geburtstag (Schriften zur Musikwissenschaft, 16) Mainz: Are Musik, 2009.
