= Die Hochzeit =

Unfinished opera by Richard Wagner

- Opera (unfinished) by Richard Wagner
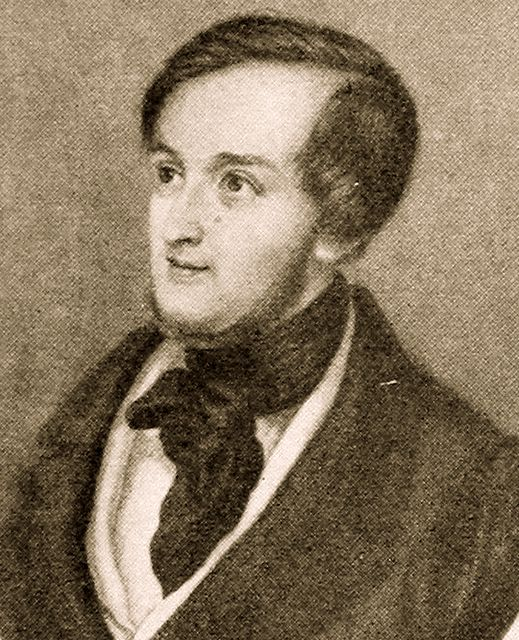
- The composer, c. 1830
- Librettist: Richard Wagner
- Language: German

Die Hochzeit (The Wedding, WWV 31) is an unfinished opera by Richard Wagner which predates his completed works in the genre. Wagner completed the libretto, then started composing the music in the second half of 1832 when he was just nineteen. He abandoned the project and destroyed the libretto after his sister Rosalie, who was the main supporter and the spokesman of the family, expressed her disgust at the story. Today, only three pieces survive from the opera.

== Synopsis ==
What is still known of the story is that it concerns the events surrounding the intended marriage of a young woman, Ada, to Arindal. This is a political marriage, not one of love. On the eve of the wedding, Ada's lover, Cadolt, comes to see her. She rejects his advances, preferring to defend her honour but, in the process, pushes him over the balcony to his death. Ada still loves Cadolt and collapses and dies at the funeral next to his body.

== Score ==
The only printed version of the surviving musical score (Introduction, Chorus and Septet) is the edition by Michael Balling (1866–1925).

Very little musicological study has been carried out relating to Die Hochzeit. 'Ada' and 'Arindal' were later used as the names of the two principal characters in Die Feen (The Fairies) (1833), Wagner's first completed opera. As there appear to be some textual parallels with Die Feen, it is possible that substantial parts of this unfinished work may have been reused there.

== Notes and references ==
Notes

Sources

- Wagner, Richard (1912). Die Hochzeit Leipzig: Breitkopf und Härtel.
