= Die Laune des Verliebten =

- Opera (project) by Richard Wagner
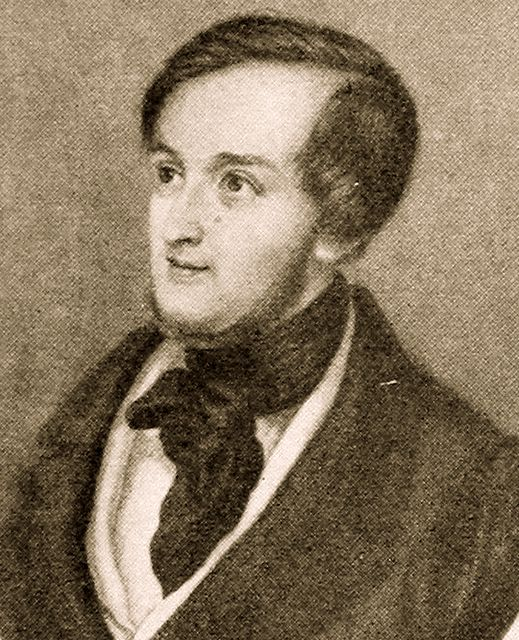
- Wagner, c. 1830
- Librettist: Richard Wagner
- Language: German
- Based on: Play by Goethe

Die Laune des Verliebten (The Mood of the One in Love) was Richard Wagner's second attempt at an opera project, after the attempt at a 5 act Shakespearean Trauerspiel called Leubald. Written in about 1830, when Wagner was 17, the libretto was based on a play of the same name by Johann Wolfgang von Goethe. Wagner wrote a scene for three female voices and a tenor aria before abandoning the project. There is no performance history for these fragments, and neither words nor music have survived.

== Sources ==
- "(Wilhelm) Richard Wagner". Grove Music Online. 2002 [1992]. doi:10.1093/gmo/9781561592630.article.O905605.
