= Männerlist größer als Frauenlist =

Unfinished Singspiel by Richard Wagner

- Opera (unfinished) by Richard Wagner
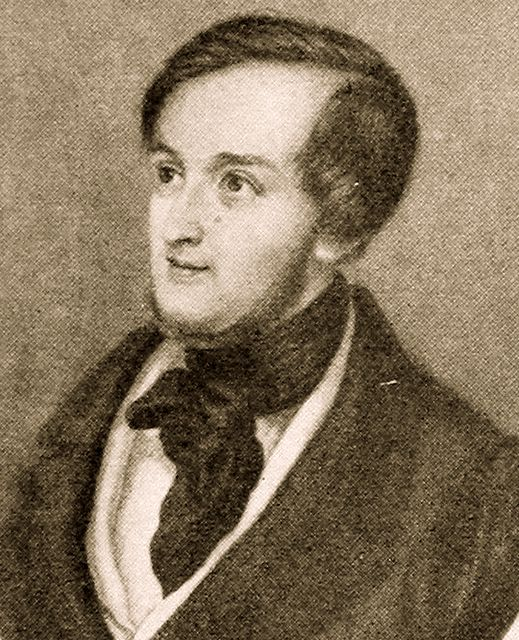
- The composer, c. 1830, the decade when he worked on the project
- Translation: Men Are More Cunning Than Women, or The Happy Bear Family
- Other title: Die glückliche Bärenfamilie
- Librettist: Richard Wagner
- Language: German

Männerlist größer als Frauenlist oder Die glückliche Bärenfamilie (Men Are More Cunning Than Women, or The Happy Bear Family; WWV 48) is an unfinished Singspiel by Richard Wagner, written between 1837 and 1838.

Männerlist was Wagner's last operatic project before he embarked on Rienzi. Although the book of the opera (which Wagner as usual wrote himself) has long been available, the full text (including dialogue) and three completed musical numbers (in piano score), were discovered in a private collection in 1994 and later acquired by the archives of the Richard-Wagner-Stiftung in Bayreuth. Wagner refers to this project in his "Red Pocketbook" and his autobiographical works A Communication to My Friends (1851) and My Life (1870–1880). In the latter he describes the work as "in a light neo-French style," which he began to write in Königsberg, but that later when he took it up in Riga for completion, "I was overtaken by utter disgust at this kind of writing."

From the complete text and the surviving music, it is clear that the piece was conceived as a Singspiel. The story is drawn from the Arabian Nights, but relocated in 19th-century Germany. The jeweller Julius Wander, pretending to be an aristocrat, is tricked into promising to marry the ugly Aurora, daughter of the class-conscious Baron von Abendthau, by her cousin Leontine. He escapes when he recognises a passing bear-keeper, Gregor, as his father – and indeed that Gregor's dancing "bear" is in fact his own brother Richard in a bear-skin. Announcing his parentage, Wander is renounced by the snobbish Abendthau, and is free to marry Leontine.

Two numbers from Männerlist realised by James Francis Brown were given their UK premieres on 13 October 2007 at the Linbury Studio Theatre, London.The full score and vocal score were published by Music Haven in 2012.

Two different productions of this work as a completed fragment were staged by the Hauptstadtoper Berlin and the Pocket Opera Company Nuremberg in 2013.
