= Mathilde Wesendonck =

German poet (1828–1902)

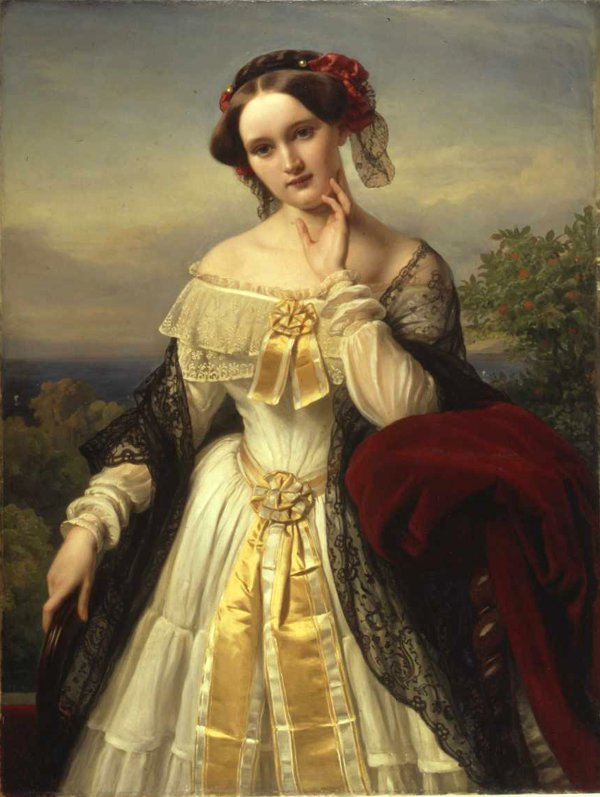
Mathilde Wesendonck (1850) by Karl Ferdinand Sohn, in the StadtMuseum Bonn

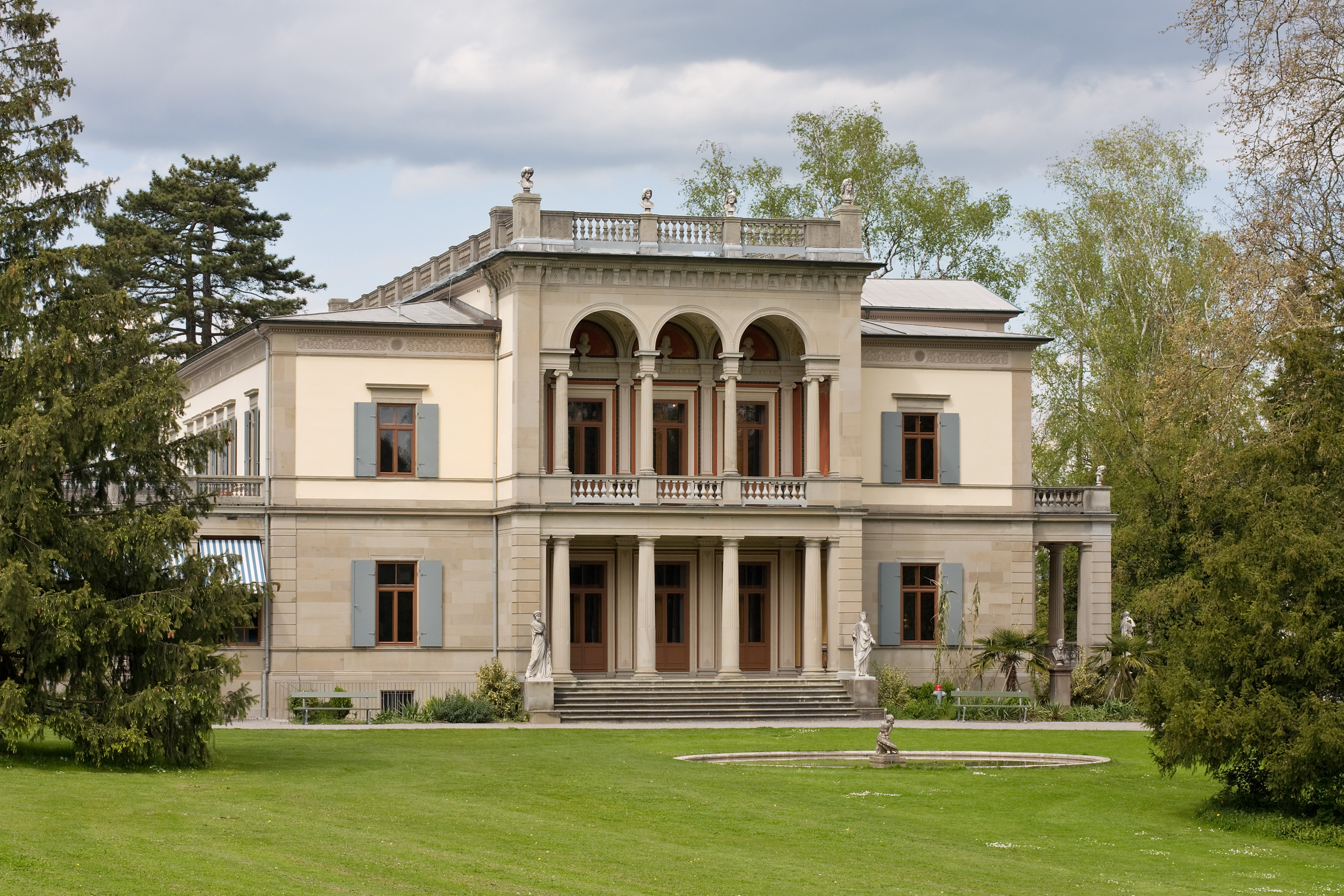
The villa of Otto and Mathilde Wesendonck in Zurich, Switzerland

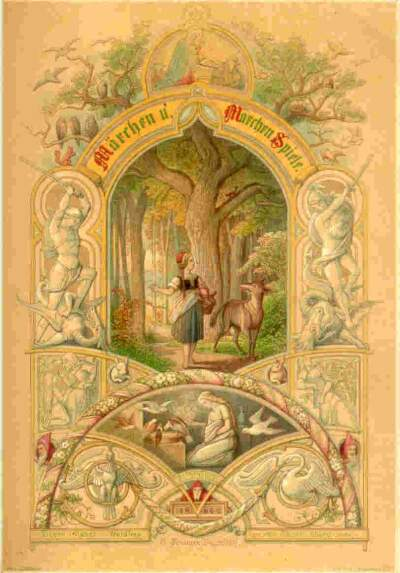
Cover of Märchen u. Märchen Spiele by Mathilde Wesendonck (published: Düsseldorf, 1864)

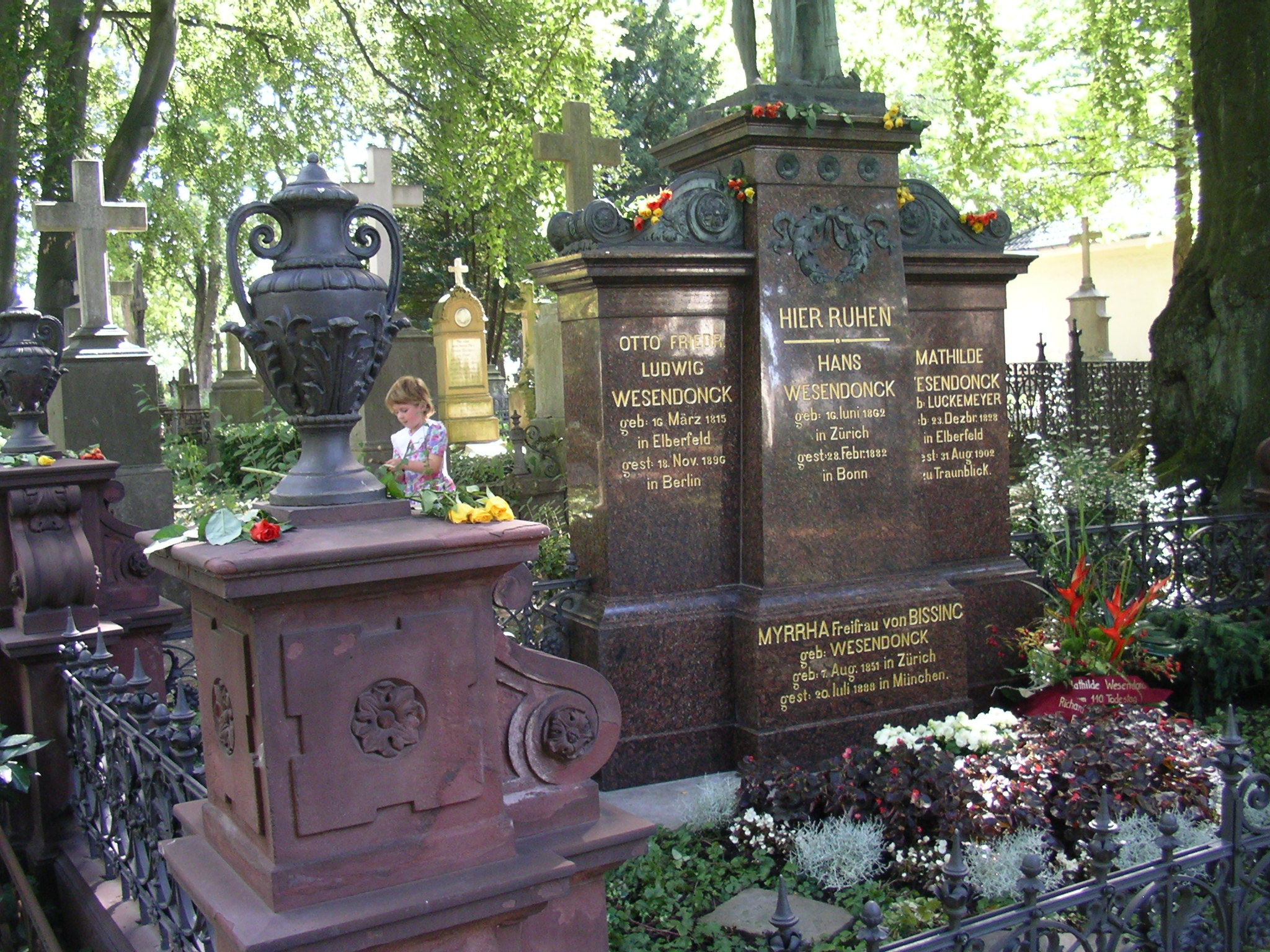
Grave of Mathilde Wesendonck and family in Bonn, Germany

Agnes Mathilde Wesendonck (née Luckemeyer; 23 December 1828 – 31 August 1902) was a German poet and author. The words of five of her verses were the basis of Richard Wagner's Wesendonck Lieder; the composer was infatuated with her, and his wife Minna blamed Mathilde for the break-up of their marriage.

== Biography ==
Agnes Mathilde Luckemeyer was born in Elberfeld (now part of Wuppertal) in the Rhineland of Germany in 1828. In 1848 she married the silk merchant Otto Wesendonck. Otto was a great admirer of Wagner's music, and after he and Mathilde met the composer in Zurich in 1852, he placed a cottage on his estate at Wagner's disposal. By 1857, Wagner had become infatuated with Mathilde. It is not known whether she returned his affections to the same degree, or if the affair - if there was one - was ever consummated. Nevertheless, the episode inspired Wagner to put aside his work on Der Ring des Nibelungen (which would not be resumed for the next twelve years) and begin work on Tristan und Isolde.

In 1858, Wagner's wife Minna intercepted a romantic letter from Wagner to Mathilde. After the resulting confrontation, Wagner left Zürich alone, for Venice. Minna went to Dresden to stay with her family. She wrote to Mathilde before departing for Dresden:

"I must tell you with a bleeding heart that you have succeeded in separating my husband from me after nearly twenty-two years of marriage. May this noble deed contribute to your peace of mind, to your happiness."

In her autobiographical reminiscences Mathilde later wrote about Wagner's stay in Zürich, but made no mention of troubles with Minna.

In 1866 Mathilde met with Johannes Brahms in Zürich and enabled him to study some of Wagner's manuscripts.

Mathilde Wesendonck died in Altmünster (Austria) in 1902, and she is buried at the Alter Friedhof with the Wesendonck family in Bonn, Germany.

== Selected works ==
- Gedichte, Volkslieder, Legenden, Sagen (ca. 1864)
- Märchen u. Märchen Spiele (1864)
- Natur-Mythen: Mai 1865 (1865)
- Genovefa: Trauerspiel in 3 Aufzügen (1866)
- Gudrun. Schauspiel in 5 Akten (1868), online at Internet Archive
- Deutsches Kinderbuch in Wort und Bild (1869)
- Friedrich der Grosse: dramatische Bilder nach Franz Kugler (1871)
- Edith, oder, Die Schlacht bei Hastings: ein Trauerspiel (1872)
- Gedichte, Volksweisen, Legenden und Sagen (1874)
- Der Baldur-Mythos (1875)
- Odysseus: ein dramatisches Gedicht in zwei Theilen und einem Vorspiel (1878)
- Alte und neue Kinder-Lieder und Reime (1890)
- Alkestis: Schauspiel in vier Aufzügen. (1891)

== In film ==
Mathilde Wesendonck was portrayed by Valentina Cortese in the 1955 film Magic Fire, and by Marthe Keller in the 1983 film Wagner.
