= Ciro riconosciuto =

Opera libretto by Pietro Metastasio

Ciro riconosciuto is an opera libretto in three acts by Pietro Metastasio, dating to around 1736.

== Sources ==
It deals with the youth of Cyrus the Great and draws on the first book of Herodotus's Histories and Marcus Iunianus Iustinus's extract from the first book of Pompeius Trogus's Historiae Philippicae, along with elements from the sixth and seventh book of Ctesias's Persica and the first book of Valerius Maximus's Historiae. The work's forerunners include 'Amasis by François Joseph de Lagrange-Chancel, in which the inability of parents to recognize their own son also plays an important role.

According to Herodotus, the Median king Astyages had two dreams indicating that he would fall due to a son of his daughter Mandane. He thus ordered his confidant Harpagus (Arpago in the libretto) to kill Cyrus as soon as he was born. Harpagus disobeyed the order but had the shepherd Mithradates (Mithradate in the libretto) leave the infant out on the mountains to die. Mithridates also disobeyed Harpagus' orders - instead he and his wife raised Cyrus as their own son. The libretto's plot begins when Cyrus reaches fifteen.

== Settings ==
It has only been set less than thirty times and was performed for the first time on 28 August 1736 at festivities in Vienna for the birthday of Elisabeth Christine, wife of Charles VI, Holy Roman Emperor. At that performance it was set to music by Antonio Caldara. A second setting, by Niccolò Jommelli for Venice, in 1749, was highly esteemed by Metastasio himself, as was the version by Johann Adolph Hasse for Dresden, 1751, in which Hasse's wife Faustina Bordoni played Mandane. Gioacchino Cocchi composed a setting for a London premiere in 1759 - it was considered the composer's best Italian opera. A German translation of the libretto appeared in 1772 under the title of Der erkannte Cyrus in the fourth volume of Johann Anton Koch's unfinished complete edition of Metastasio's works.

== Sources ==
- http://www.progettometastasio.it/pietrometastasio/indice_a.jsp
