= Ursula Kramer =

German musicologist

Ursula Kramer (born 1960) is a German musicologist. She has taught at the University of Mainz since 2001, and as a professor from 2007. She has been president of the Christoph-Graupner-Gesellschaft from 2007.

== Career ==
Kramer studied musicology, German, English, Romance languages and music pedagogy at the Hochschule für Musik Mainz from 1980 to 1987. She studied partly on a scholarship of the Studienstiftung des deutschen Volkes. In 1987, she graduated in music pedagogy and as Magister Artium in musicology. She also studied the bassoon. She obtained a Ph.D. in 1992 with the thesis "Richtiges Licht und gehörige Perspektive. Studien zur Funktion des Orchesters in der Oper des 19. Jahrhunderts", on the function of the orchestra in 19th-century opera. She worked as a dramaturge at the Staatstheater Mainz, and from 1992 to 1995 as Orchestergeschäftsführerin and personal Referentin of Generalmusikdirektor Peter Erckens. She was an assistant at the Hochschule für Musik from 1995 to 2001, when she completed her habilitation. She then lectured at the Hochschule and was named außerplanmäßige Professorin in 2007.

Kramer has been president of the Christoph-Graupner-Gesellschaft, an association dedicated to the composer Christoph Graupner, since 2007.

== Publications ==
- "Richtiges Licht und gehörige Perspektive – Studien zur Funktion des Orchesters in der Oper des 19. Jahrhunderts" (Ph.D. thesis). Tutzing 1992 (Mainzer Studien zur Musikwissenschaft, founded by Hellmut Federhofer and continued by Christoph-Hellmut Mahling, volume 28).
- "Studien zur Geschichte der Bläserkammermusik von den Anfängen des 19. Jahrhunderts bis zum Zweiten Weltkrieg." habilitation thesis, Mainz 2000 (unpublished)
- Goethe e lo Sturm und Drang. Como 2003
- Schauspielmusik am Hoftheater in Darmstadt 1810–1918. Spiel-Arten einer selbstverständlichen Theaterpraxis. Mainz 2008.
- Kramer, Ursula (September 2012). "12 – The Court of Hesse-Darmstadt". In Samantha Owens; Barbara M. Reul; Janice B. Stockigt (eds.). Music at German Courts, 1715–1760. Boydell & Brewer. ISBN 9781846159312.
- Ursula Kramer, ed. (2011). Musikalische Handlungsräume im Wandel: Christoph Graupner in Darmstadt zwischen Oper und und Sinfonie. Beiträge zur mittelrheinischen Musikgeschichte. Vol. 42. Mainz: Schott Music.
- Kramer, Ursula (ed.). Theater mit Musik. 400 Jahre Schauspielmusik im europäischen Theater. Bedingungen – Strategien – Wahrnehmungen. Bielefeld 2014
- Kramer, Ursula (2017). "15 As Goethe Intended? Max Reinhardt's Faust Productions and the Aesthetics of Incidental Music in the Early Twentieth Century". In Lorraine Bodley (ed.). Music in Goethe's Faust: Goethe's Faust in Music. pp. 245–261.
