= Minna Planer =

German actress (1809–1866)

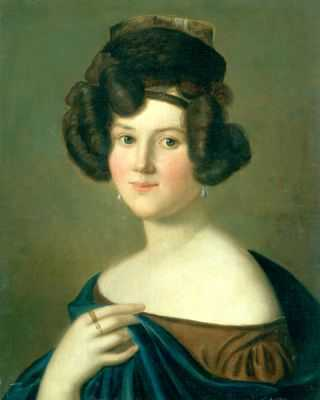
- Minna Planer (1835) by Alexander von Otterstedt
- Born: Christine Wilhelmine Planer; 5 September 1809; Oederan, Kingdom of Saxony
- Died: 25 January 1866 (aged 56); Dresden, Kingdom of Saxony
- Occupation: Actress
- Known for: Spouse of Richard Wagner
- Spouse: Richard Wagner (1836–1866)
- Children: 1
- Parent: Gotthelf Planer (father)

Christine Wilhelmine "Minna" Planer (5 September 1809 – 25 January 1866) was a German actress and the first wife of composer Richard Wagner, to whom she was married for 30 years, although for the last 10 years they often lived apart. At an early age, she had an illegitimate daughter with a Royal Saxon Army officer, whom she raised as her sister. After a stormy courtship, which involved infidelities on both sides, she married Richard Wagner in 1836.

In the early years Minna was the main wage earner in the household, having a successful career as a dramatic heroine who drew both applause for her abilities on stage and admirers for her beauty. She shared in many of the escapades of Wagner's life, including a perilous sea voyage to London, poverty in Paris, and following him around Europe after his involvement in the Dresden uprising of 1849, which led to his banishment from Germany.

After Wagner's affair with Mathilde Wesendonck in 1857, Minna mostly lived apart from him. In later years she developed a heart condition which ultimately claimed her life.

== Life ==
=== Early life ===
Minna Planer was born on 5 September 1809 to a former Army trumpeter, Gotthelf Planer, in Oederan, Kingdom of Saxony. She was brought up in poverty and then at the age of fifteen was seduced by Ernst Rudolf von Einsiedel, a captain in the King of Saxony's Guards, who abandoned her after making her pregnant. Minna was sent to her relatives in the country to conceal the pregnancy, and when her daughter, Nathalie ("Netty"), was born, she was brought up as Minna's sister.

Minna pursued a career as an actress, specialising in female juvenile lead roles ("Erste Liebhaberin") in tragedies. She was in demand by many German theatre companies, and appeared in Dessau, Altenburg, Magdeburg and Dresden before she met Richard Wagner. In a letter dated 27 December 1833, Minna sets out her conditions for employment: she would not accept guest appearances, but expected the leading tragic and young heroine parts. Her fee was 600 thaler plus travelling expenses. While she was praised for her abilities as an actress, her physical charms also brought her admiration. One anonymous suitor wrote to her: "When Nature created you, O Fair One, she broke the mold and never more may create so fair an image. Ah, I have known you long, you splendid creature, beautiful in youth, your lovely image flitting around in my dreams..."

=== Wagner ===
"My Dear, Dear, my own unique Girl! Already more than 24 hours apart from you after I have so often treasured every minute! What will come of this? I am lost in my misery and tears, and I can find joy in nothing, nothing whatever! You have become too dear to me, I am sure of that, you dear and lovely child! How can I become accustomed so soon to our separation? How can I bear your absence? You have become part of me, and without you I feel in all my limbs as if a part of me were missing. Alas, if you felt only half my longing, then you too would be filled with love and memories. I still wept after you had gone."

— Letter from Richard Wagner to Minna Planer May 6, 1835.

In 1834 Minna was appearing as part of Heinrich Eduard Bethmann's Magdeburg Theatre Company during a summer season at Bad Lauchstädt, a spa resort near Halle. She was almost 25. Richard Wagner had arrived in Lauchstädt on 1 August to investigate the offer of a position as conductor of the Magdeburg company and was unimpressed by the offer until he met Minna by chance while looking for lodgings for the night. The 21-year-old Wagner changed his mind and accepted the contract in order to pursue her, taking rooms directly beneath hers.

Minna's relationship with Wagner was stormy: Wagner was jealous and possessive and there were frequent loud arguments which usually ended with Minna in tears. However, by the time the company returned to Magdeburg to open the season in October 1834 the two were lovers, and by February 1835 Wagner wrote to his brother Alfred that he and Minna were engaged, although to Wagner's fury Minna continued to be pursued by other suitors. In November 1835 Minna, dissatisfied with the Magdeburg troupe and probably with Wagner as well, left suddenly to take on a role at the Königstadt Theatre in Berlin. Wagner was wild with despair and implored her to come back and marry him. Minna eventually agreed to return, but stayed only to the end of the season in Magdeburg before heading to Königsberg to join the local theatre company, while Wagner looked for work in Berlin. Failing in this, he joined Minna in Königsberg and accepted a menial position as a junior conductor. Minna married Wagner in Tragheim Church on 26 November 1836, where they argued even in front of the minister who was to marry them.

=== Early married years ===
Minna soon found that being Wagner's wife was not the route to respectability that she craved. Wagner continued to run up debts, and she frequently had to deal with creditors not only from Königsberg, but also from Wagner's previous expenditure in Magdeburg. Wagner's position brought in little money and Minna's continued popularity on stage meant that she was the main bread-winner, earning 700 reichsthaler in 1836. She continued to have admirers, and on 31 May 1837 Minna ran away from Wagner with a local businessman named Dietrich, taking Nathalie with her. Wagner eventually found her at her parents' home in Dresden, and begged her to return to him. Despite another short reconciliation, Minna ran away again with Dietrich in July 1837. It was only in October that Minna finally had a change of heart and returned to Wagner, who had taken up a post in Riga as music director.

=== Flight from Riga ===
Minna also obtained a position at the Riga City Theater, and they lived in Riga for two years until Wagner lost his post in January 1839. He then decided on a wild scheme to evade his creditors: He and Minna together with their dog Robber would flee across the nearby Russian border and board a ship bound for London and then travel on to Paris, where Wagner expected that his new opera Rienzi would make his fortune. Minna made her last stage appearance in Riga on 18 April in the title role of Schiller's Maria Stuart. It was her income from this appearance that paid for their flight from Riga to London and Paris. On 10 July, they made the illegal border crossing safely, despite the risk of being shot by border guards, but on 14 July they were in a wagon which overturned, crushing Minna. Nathalie later claimed that Minna suffered a miscarriage as a result. While there is no other evidence for this claim, it is a fact that Minna bore Wagner no children. Minna and Wagner set sail from Pillau on the Thetis and ran into a storm which led them to berth in a Norwegian fjord. They only arrived in London after a terrifying 24-day journey for a trip that should normally have taken 8 days. After a week recovering in London, they took a steamer to Paris.

=== Paris and Dresden ===
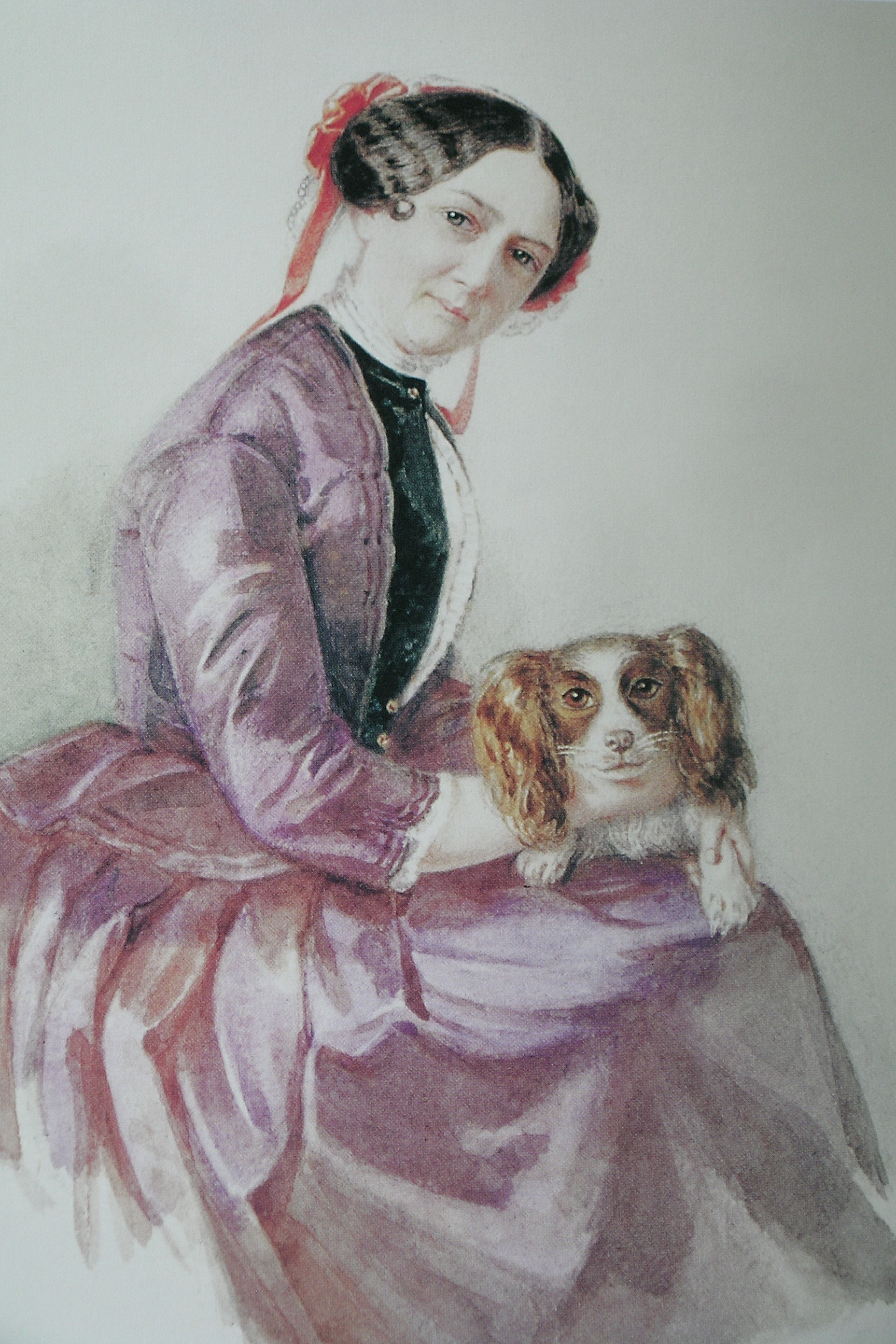
Minna Wagner in 1853 with her dog "Peps". Watercolour by Clementine Stockar-Escher

Minna and Wagner spent the years 1839 to 1842 in Paris, enduring severe poverty. Wagner's plan failed, since the Paris Opera was not interested in producing either Rienzi or his newest work, Der Fliegende Holländer. Wagner was imprisoned for debt, and Minna had to beg their German friends in Paris for money to release him. It was only the acceptance by the Hoftheater in Dresden of Rienzi that allowed the Wagners to leave Paris in April 1842. In Dresden Wagner became Royal Kapellmeister and achieved the stability and social status that Minna had hoped for. However Wagner's involvement in the Dresden uprising in May 1849 led to a warrant being issued for his arrest, and Wagner fled to Zürich.

Minna was furious with him and after this their relationship cooled irreparably. She considered Zurich a provincial town and lamented the loss of her social position as Frau Kapellmeister. It was only in August of that year that she agreed to rejoin Wagner in Zurich, but it was plain that their world-views were now totally different. Minna could understand his work as a conductor, but increasingly found his operatic works not to her liking. Nevertheless, she was now tied to him since it was unlikely that she would again be able to work on the stage, and she had a horror of ending up in servitude. Minna also began to show signs of heart disease, for which she was prescribed laudanum. Before joining Wagner in Zurich she wrote to him:

My greatest pride and pleasure was seeing you as the head of the greatest orchestra in Germany. You may remember that I missed almost no performance which you conducted, saw only you and was happy. I believed that what I was hearing emanated from you only...the Ninth Symphony will be forever unforgettable to me on account of you. You appeared to me like a God governing all the powerful elements and working enchantments on men. See, dear Richard, you own the power, the glorious gift of creating something great even as a conductor...

=== Zurich and Mathilde Wesendonck ===
Wagner attempted to leave Minna in 1850 when he had an affair with the married 21-year-old Jessie Laussot, with whom he planned to elope to the Far East. However Minna, together with Jessie's mother, put a stop to this plan and Wagner eventually returned to Minna and for a while their relationship regained some of its original ardour. During a visit in the summer 1856, Ferdinand Praeger recorded "A picture of Minna", capturing the dynamic of their relationship:

As a housewife she was most efficient. In their days of distress she cheerfully performed what are vulgarly termed menial services. In this she is as fitting a parallel of Mrs. Carlyle, as Wagner is of Carlyle. . . . Minna's efforts in the house and sustaining Wagner in the dark days is the pendant of Mrs. Carlyle's scrubbing the floors of the little house at Scotsbrig in the wilds of Scottish moors.

It was the affair with Mathilde Wesendonck while Wagner was working on Tristan und Isolde in 1857 that provoked the final breach between Minna and Wagner. After her discovery of a letter from Wagner to Mathilde in April 1858, Minna accused them of adultery, which Wagner denied, claiming that Minna had put a "vulgar interpretation" on his letter. Minna took the view that Wagner had been seduced by Mathilde, and in subsequent letters referred to her as "that hussy" and "that filthy woman". Nevertheless, Wagner and Minna parted, Wagner to travel to Venice and Minna to take the waters at Brestenberg in an attempt to improve her worsening heart condition. Minna wrote to Mathilde before departing for Dresden:

I must tell you with a bleeding heart that you have succeeded in separating my husband from me after nearly twenty-two years of marriage. May this noble deed contribute to your peace of mind, to your happiness.

Minna later described Tristan and Isolde as "a much too enamoured and odious couple."

=== Paris and the final years ===
"I haven't seen my good, excellent husband for almost two and a half years. He is happy, lives in Munich in the greatest luxury through the young King of Bavaria; he doesn't need me any more....If he were again in great distress he would come back to me. God knows whether I'll live to see that; and if I do, whether I should still be inclined toward a man who has so deeply and continually insulted me and has done this out of an exaggerated, silly vanity which miserable, slovenly women have awakened in him, whereby he became heartless and mean toward his stupid, faithful old companion. Unfortunately he'll starve as an artist, for he hasn't created anything since he separated from me; his whole life is taken up by insipid, unworthy, superficial trivialities..."

— Letter of March 28th 1864, from Minna to Ernst Kietz.

It was only in November 1859 when Wagner moved to Paris to attempt to perform a revised version of Tannhäuser at the Opera that Minna agreed to his requests that she join him, but again the relationship was not easy. Minna disapproved of his rewritten Tannhäuser and thought that he could have secured a financial success with Rienzi. After the fiasco of the Paris Tannhäuser, in July 1861 Wagner went to Vienna, while Minna went again to Bad Soden and then to Dresden, where she, Nathalie and her parents lived at Wagner's expense.

In February 1862 when Wagner was living in Biebrich Minna made a surprise visit to him, which started well but all the old troubles were stirred when a letter from Mathilde Wesendonck arrived. Wagner referred to this period as "10 days of hell". In June 1862 he suggested they divorce; however, Minna refused to consider this. Despite her repeated requests for him to join her in Dresden, he would not.

Minna and Wagner were never to live together again, but neither did they divorce. Minna was financially supported by Wagner for the rest of her life.

Minna Wagner died of a heart attack on 25 January 1866 in Dresden. Wagner did not attend the funeral. Minna's grave is in the "Alter Annenfriedhof" in Dresden.

== Burrell Collection ==
Much of the detail of Wagner's relationship with Minna comes from the letters they wrote to each other. After Minna's death, her daughter Nathalie kept many of these letters, and eventually sold most of them to Mary Burrell, who planned to write a biography of Wagner. Although Burrell died before completing the biography, the Burrell Collection of Wagner's letters, including some from Minna, was eventually published in 1950, with the originals being housed in the Curtis Institute of Music in Philadelphia.

== See also ==
- Wagner family tree
