= Das Liebesmahl der Apostel =

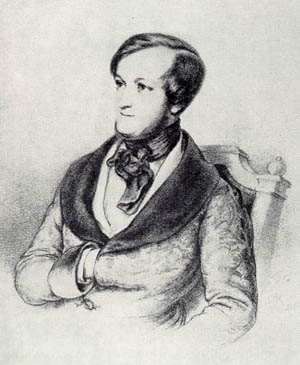
Wagner c. 1840, by Ernest Benedikt Kietz

Das Liebesmahl der Apostel (1843) WWV 69 (in English The Feast of Pentecost, "The Love-Meal of the Apostles") is a piece for orchestra and male choruses by Richard Wagner. It is rarely performed and little known. Many years after having written it, Wagner described it as "a sort of folkloric miracle play".

== History ==
Wagner, who had been elected in January 1843 to the committee of a cultural association in the city of Dresden, received a commission to evoke the theme of Pentecost. He had successfully performed Rienzi in Dresden in 1842; however, Der fliegende Holländer, produced there in January 1843, was not received as warmly.

The premiere of Das Liebesmahl took place at the Dresdner Frauenkirche on 6 July 1843, and was performed by around a hundred musicians and almost 1,200 singers, from all over Saxony. The work was dedicated to Charlotte Emilie Weinlig, the widow of Wagner's former teacher Christian Theodor Weinlig. The concert was very well received, but Wagner was disappointed by its "relatively feeble effect" in view of the vast assembly of singers it had brought together.

== Instrumentation ==
- Choir
  - Tenor baritone bass
  - 12 bass (The Twelve Apostles)
  - 16 tenor 12 baritone 12 bass (Voices from above)
- Orchestra
  - Woodwinds: piccolo, 2 flutes, 2 oboes, 2 clarinets, 4 bassoons, serpent
  - Brass: 4 horns, 4 trumpets, 3 trombones, tuba
  - Percussion: 4 timpani
  - Strings: 16 first violins, 16 second violins, 12 violas, 12 cellos, 8 basses

== Description ==
The choir in three or four parts at first respond at length a cappella, evoking the disarray of the apostles, then comes together in a crescendo calling upon the Spirit to descend. Then comes the chorus "Be comforted", preceding an intervention by the orchestra, soon to accompany the descent of the Holy Spirit, in a triumphant ensemble.

== Media ==
Das Liebesmahl der Apostel
Das Liebesmahl der Apostel in a 16-minute abridged instrumental arrangement by M. Pohle for brass band, played by the United States Marine Corps Band.
