= Egon Voss =

German musicologist (born 1938)

Egon Voss (born 7 November 1938) is a German musicologist, who is particularly known for his contributions to Richard Wagner research.

== Life and career ==
Born in Magdeburg, Voss studied musicology and German studies at the Universities in Detmold, Kiel, Münster und Saarbrücken. He was awarded his doctorate in 1968. For many years he worked as an assistant and editor of the Wagner-Gesamtausgabe.

Voss not only published a number of works and life documents by Wagner, Bach and Schumann, but was also otherwise active in researching the history of music theatre.

== Books ==
- Richard Wagner – Dokumentarbiographie, Munich: Goldmann 1982
- Wagner und kein Ende. Betrachtungen und Studien, Zürich: Atlantis 1996

== Essays ==
- Zu Beethoven's Piano Sonata No. 31 Op. 110, in Die Musikforschung, vol. 23 (1970), p. 256–267
- Beethoven's Eroica und die Gattung der Sinfonie, in Bericht über den Internationalen Musikwissenschaftlichen Kongress (1971), p. 600–603
- Zur Frage der Wiederholung von Scherzo und Trio in Beethovens fifth Synfony, in Die Musikforschung, vol. 33 (1980), p. 195–199
- Ein unbekannter Komponist? Zur neuen Richard-Wagner-Gesamtausgabe, in NZ Neue Zeitschrift für Musik, volume 144 (1983), S. 34f.
- Ergebnisse und Aufgaben der Wagnerforschung, in Bericht über den Internationalen Musikwissenschaftlichen Kongress Bayreuth 1981 (1984), p. 437–439
- „Überall die andaurende Trommete von Händels Ruhm“. Eine Betrachtung über den Erfolg des Messiah, in NZ Neue Zeitschrift für Musik, volume 146 (1985), p. 5–9
- Ein Emigrant im eigenen Land. Karl Amadeus Hartmann zum achtzigsten Geburtstag, in NZ, vol. 146 (1985), 7/8, p. 64–65
- Auch eine Unvollendete. Richard Wagners wiederaufgefundenes Sinfonie-Fragment in E-Dur WWV 35, in NZ, vol. 149 (1988), 11, p. 14–18
- Wagner und Bruckner. Ihre persönliche Beziehung anhand der überlieferten Zeugnisse, in Anton Bruckner. Studien zu Werk und Wirkung. Walter Wiora zum 30. Dezember 1986, edited by Christoph-Hellmut Mahling, Tutzing 1988, p. 230
- Schwierigkeiten im Umgang mit dem Ballett „Die Geschöpfe des Prometheus“ by Salvatore Viganò und Ludwig van Beethoven, in Archiv für Musikwissenschaft, Jg. 53 (1996), p. 21–40
- Wagner-Zitate in Bruckners Third Symphony? Ein Beitrag zum Begriff des Zitats in der Musik, in Die Musikforschung, Jg. 49 (1996), p. 403–406
- Die „schwarze und die weiße Flagge“. Zur Entstehung von Wagners „Tristan“, in Archiv für Musikwissenschaft, Jg. 54 (1997), p. 210–227
- Einflüsse Rossinis und Bellinis auf das Werk Wagners, in Richard Wagner und seine „Lehrmeister“. Bericht der Tagung am Musikwissenschaftlichen Institut der Johannes-Gutenberg-Universität Mainz, 6./7. Juni 1997. Egon Voss zum 60. Geburtstag, edited by Christoph-Hellmut Mahling and Kristina Pfarr, Mainz 1999, p. 95–118
- Krise der Symphonie um 1850: ja oder nein? Was spricht gegen die These von Carl Dahlhaus und was dafür?, in Aspekte historischer und systematischer Musikforschung (2002), p. 9–18
- Versagt die Musikwissenschaft vor der Musik Richard Wagners?, in Der „Komponist“ Richard Wagner im Blick der aktuellen Musikwissenschaft. Symposion Würzburg 2000, edited by Ulrich Konrad and Egon Voss, Wiesbaden 2003, p. 15–24
- Sprechen über Musik – Richard Wagner, in Musik und Verstehen (2004), p. 123–131
- „Oper im Kirchengewande.“ Zur Rezeption von Verdis „Requiem“ im deutschen Sprachraum, in Das Bild der italienischen Oper in Deutschland (2004), p. 191–199
- Prima e seconda prattica? Beethovens Musik für Bläser und ihre Position im Gesamtwerk, in Die Musikforschung, Jg. 58 (2005), p. 353–360
- Zwischen Partitur und Aufführungsmaterial oder: Opernedition und Werkbegriff (Wagner), in Opernedition (2005), p. 123–131
- Die klassische Symphonie. Haydns Londoner Symphonien im Überblick, in Haydns Londoner Symphonien (2007), p. 23–38
- Sozialismus und „freie Entwicklung der Kunst“. Karl Amadeus Hartmann und seine Oper „Simplicius Simplicissimus“, in Musik-Konzepte, vol. 147 (2010), p. 82–97
- „So pocht das Schicksal an die Pforte!“ Überlegungen zu Anton Schindlers Äußerungen über den Beginn of Beethoven Symphony No. 5, in Bonner Beethoven-Studien, vol. 11 (2014), p. 185–191

== Publications ==
- Richard Wagner, Die Meistersinger von Nürnberg, Mainz: Schott 1979, 1983, 1987 (Wagner-Gesamtausgabe, volume 9)
- Ludwig van Beethoven, Kammermusik mit Blasinstrumenten, Munich: Henle 2008 (Neue Beethoven-Gesamtausgabe, division 6, volume 1)
