= John Deathridge =

- Born: John William Deathridge; 21 October 1944 (age 81); Birmingham, England
- Occupations: musicologist, conductor, accompanist, broadcaster
- Instruments: Piano, organ

John William Deathridge (born 21 October 1944, in Birmingham) is a British musicologist. He was educated at King Edward's School, Birmingham, and at Lincoln College, Oxford (MA, DPhil) culminating with a dissertation on Wagner's sketches for Rienzi, later published by Clarendon Press. He is Emeritus Professor of Music at King's College London. Deathridge lives in Cambridge.

== Professional life ==
After graduating from Oxford, Deathridge worked as full-time director of music at St Wolfgang, Munich, where he continued research on Wagner and acted as a conductor and broadcaster. From 1983 to 1996 he was a fellow and director of studies in music at King's College, Cambridge and a lecturer in music at the Faculty of Music, University of Cambridge. In the latter capacity he also served as Secretary of the Faculty Board of Music (1986–1990) and as a Member of the General Board of the University (1990–94). Appointed a Reader in Music at Cambridge in 1995, the following year he took up the King Edward VII Professorship of Music at King's College London, where he also served as Head of the Department of Music.

Between 2005 and 2008 he served as president of the Royal Musical Association, Since 2010 Deathridge has been a Trustee of The Handel Institute in London, and from December 2011 he has also served as a member of the board of the European Academy of Music Theatre.

Deathridge has also taught at Princeton University and the University of Chicago and served as an editor of the complete edition of Wagner's musical works. He retired from King's College London in 2013 where he now holds the title of Professor Emeritus

Deathridge's career has included work as a radio and television broadcaster and as a reviewer for scholarly music journals in Germany and the United Kingdom.

Deathridge's translation of Wagner's Der Ring des Nibelungen into English was published by Penguin Random House in 2018 and he later created a new singing translation for the performance of the Cycle staged by ENO from 2021.

== Selected works ==
- With Carl Dahlhaus, The New Grove Wagner, 1984, Macmillan Press
- Introduction author, The Family Letters of Richard Wagner, trans. William Ashton Ellis, 1992, University of Michigan Press
- Translation editor, Wagner Handbook, Edited by Ulrich Muller and Peter Wapnewski. Harvard University Press.
- Wagner: Beyond Good and Evil, 2008, University of California Press
- Richard Wagner: The Ring of the Nibelung (new translation into English), 2018, Penguin
