= Leubald =

Play by Richard Wagner

Leubald was an attempt by the youthful Richard Wagner to write a tragic drama in the Shakespearean genre. It occupied him during the years 1827-28 while he was at school, first in Dresden and later in Leipzig. The play combines elements of Hamlet, King Lear, Macbeth and Richard III, with influences from Goethe and Heinrich von Kleist. The critic Theodor Adorno has noted:

Leubald [and Wagner's other early writings] are all of a piece with those plays of which high-school pupils are wont to write in their exercise books the title, the Dramatis Personae, and the words 'Act I'.

It is unclear whether, or in what manner, Wagner intended to set this text to music, but the desire to do so may have been the factor which led him to begin the study of composition. No music for Leubald has survived, but the text of the play exists. It has been suggested that the character of Adriano in Wagner's later opera Rienzi is recognisably based on that of Leubald in the earlier drama.

== See also ==
- List of compositions by Richard Wagner

== Sources ==
- Adorno, Theodor (2009), tr. Rodney Livingstone, In Search of Wagner, Verso, London ISBN 978-1-84467-344-5
- Gutman, Robert W. (1971): Richard Wagner: The Man, His Mind and His Music, Penguin Books, London ISBN 0-14-021168-3
- Millington, Barry (2001): (Wilhelm) Richard Wagner in Grove Music Online, ed. Laura Macy. Retrieved on 20 March 2009 (subscription required)
