= Wagner-Werk-Verzeichnis =

Index and musicological guide to works by German composer Richard Wagner

The Wagner-Werk-Verzeichnis (Catalogue of Wagner's Works), abbreviated WWV, is an index and musicological guide to the 113 musical compositions and works for the stage by Richard Wagner. It includes guidance on editions of the published works and explanations of historical performance practices. John Deathridge, Martin Geck, and Egon Voss compiled the catalogue.

In compiling the catalogue, the authors studied Wagner's writings and examined drafts, sketches, and scores of the compositions. For the full list, see List of compositions by Richard Wagner.

== See also ==
- List of works for the stage by Richard Wagner
- Bach-Werke-Verzeichnis
- Händel-Werke-Verzeichnis
- Werkverzeichnis Anton Bruckner
