= Gordon Kampe =

German composer and academic teacher

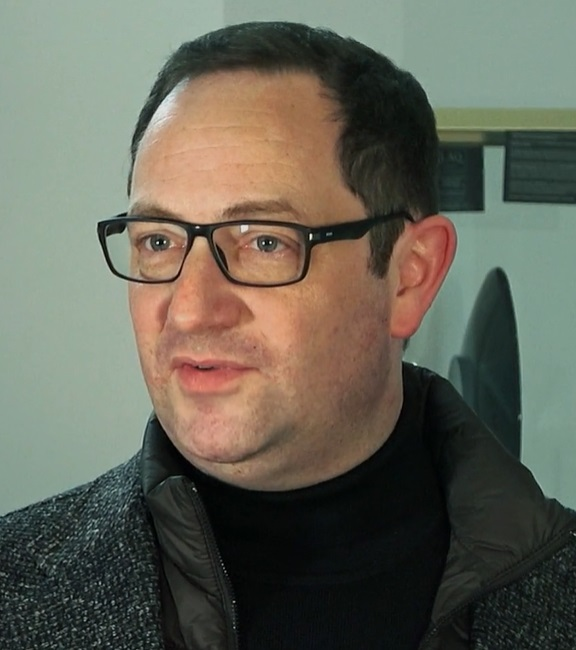
- Kampe at the premiere of Dogville in 2023
- Born: 10 September 1976 (age 50); Herne, North Rhine-Westphalia, Germany
- Occupations: Composer; Academic teacher
- Known for: Contemporary music
- Website: gordonkampe.de

Gordon Kampe (born 10 September 1976) is a German composer and academic teacher.

== Career ==
Kampe was born in Herne, North Rhine-Westphalia, Germany. He completed an apprenticeship as an electrician in 1995 and studied after his Abitur composition with Hans-Joachim Hespos, Adriana Hölszky (Rostock) and Nicolaus A. Huber (Essen). In 2008, he finished his dissertation about fairy tale opera of the 20th century at the Folkwang University of the Arts.

Kampe is notably interested in the opera. Since 2009 he has written a number of commissioned works, among other for the Stuttgart State Opera (Zivilcourage. Musik für einen Platz, world premiere 2009), the Oldenburg State Theatre (ANOIA, world premiere 2012) and the Deutsche Oper Berlin (Kannst du pfeifen, Johanna, world premiere 2013). The world premiere of PLÄTZE. DÄCHER. LEUTE. WEGE. Musiktheater für ein utopisches Bielefeld took place at Bielefeld Opera in 2015.

Kampe's opera Dogville, based on the film with the same name by Lars von Trier, premiered at the Aalto Theatre in Essen in 2023.

Kampe has been a professor of composition and music theory at the Hochschule für Musik und Theater Hamburg since 2017. He lives and works in Hamburg, Germany.

== Compositions (selection) ==
- High Noon: Moskitos for orchestra (2003/06)
- heavy metal for flute solo (2008)
- Gassenhauermaschinensuite for clarinet, cello, accordion, percussion, and tape (2009)
- Zehn Symphonien for saxophone quartet (2011)
- Spione for orchestra (2017)
- Fat Finger Error for orchestra (2018)
- Gefährliche Operette for countertenor and ensemble, texts by Schorsch Kamerun, Wiglaf Droste, Marc-Uwe Kling (2017-19)
  - revised version for mezzo-soprano, baritone, actor, and ensemble, with additional dialogues by Ann-Christine Mecke (2022)
- Ich will lächeln, lächeln, lächeln, an opera, based upon Shakespeare's Twelfth Night, libretto by Thierry Bruehl (2019)
- remember me for string ensemble and live electronics (2019)
- I forgot to remember to forget for six voices and record players (2020)
- Dogville, an opera in 18 scenes, based on a Lars von Trier film (2020/21)
- boxen! for timpani and orchestra (2023)
- Mein Fleisch for two voices and orchestra (2024)
- immermeeehr, a children's music theater piece, text by Maria Milisavljević (2024)

== Awards ==
- 2007 Kompositionspreis der Landeshauptstadt Stuttgart
- 2011 Kompositionspreis der Landeshauptstadt Stuttgart
- 2016 Ernst von Siemens Composers' Prize
- 2016 Schneider-Schott Music Prize

=== Scholarships ===
- 2007 Cité internationale des arts
- 2008 Künstlerhof Schreyahn
- 2017/2018 Villa Massimo

=== Memberships ===
- 2019 Freie Akademie der Künste Hamburg

== Discography ==
- Gordon Kampe: HAL / High Noon: Moskitos / Ripley-Musik V / Qs Nachtstück / Picard / Gassenhauermaschinensuite WERGO 2011 (WER 6581 2)
- "Nischenmusik mit Klopfgeistern", Decoder Ensemble für Aktuelle Musik, Ahornfelder 2015 (AH27)
- "Falsche Lieder", Neue Vocalsolisten Stuttgart: Drama, col legno 2014 (WWE 1CD 20413)
- "heavy metal", Beatrix Wagner – Spiegelungen, Edition Zeitklang (ez 44046)
- "zu drei Stücken entzwei", Magic Flute Remixed, GENUIN 2006 (GEN 86078)
