= Lippinghauser Bach =

River in Germany

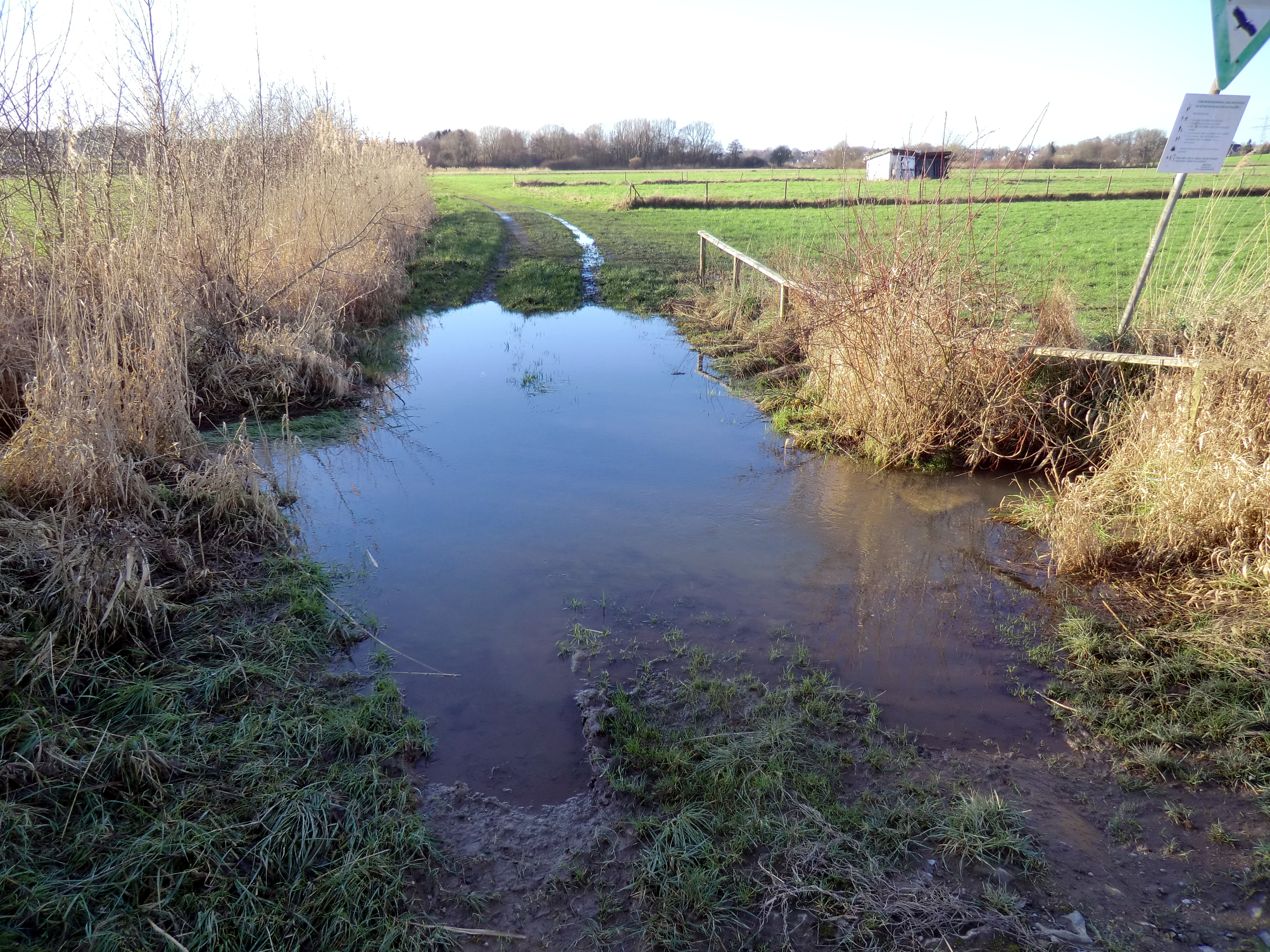

Location
- Country: Germany
- States: North Rhine-Westphalia

Physical characteristics
- Mouth
  - location: Düsedieksbach
  - coordinates: 52.1358°N 8.6450°E

Basin features
- Progression: Düsedieksbach→ Werre→ Weser→ North Sea

Lippinghauser Bach is a small river of North Rhine-Westphalia, Germany. It is 3 km long and flows into the Düsedieksbach as a left tributary near Herford.

== See also ==
- List of rivers of North Rhine-Westphalia
