= Hein Mulders =

Dutch opera director

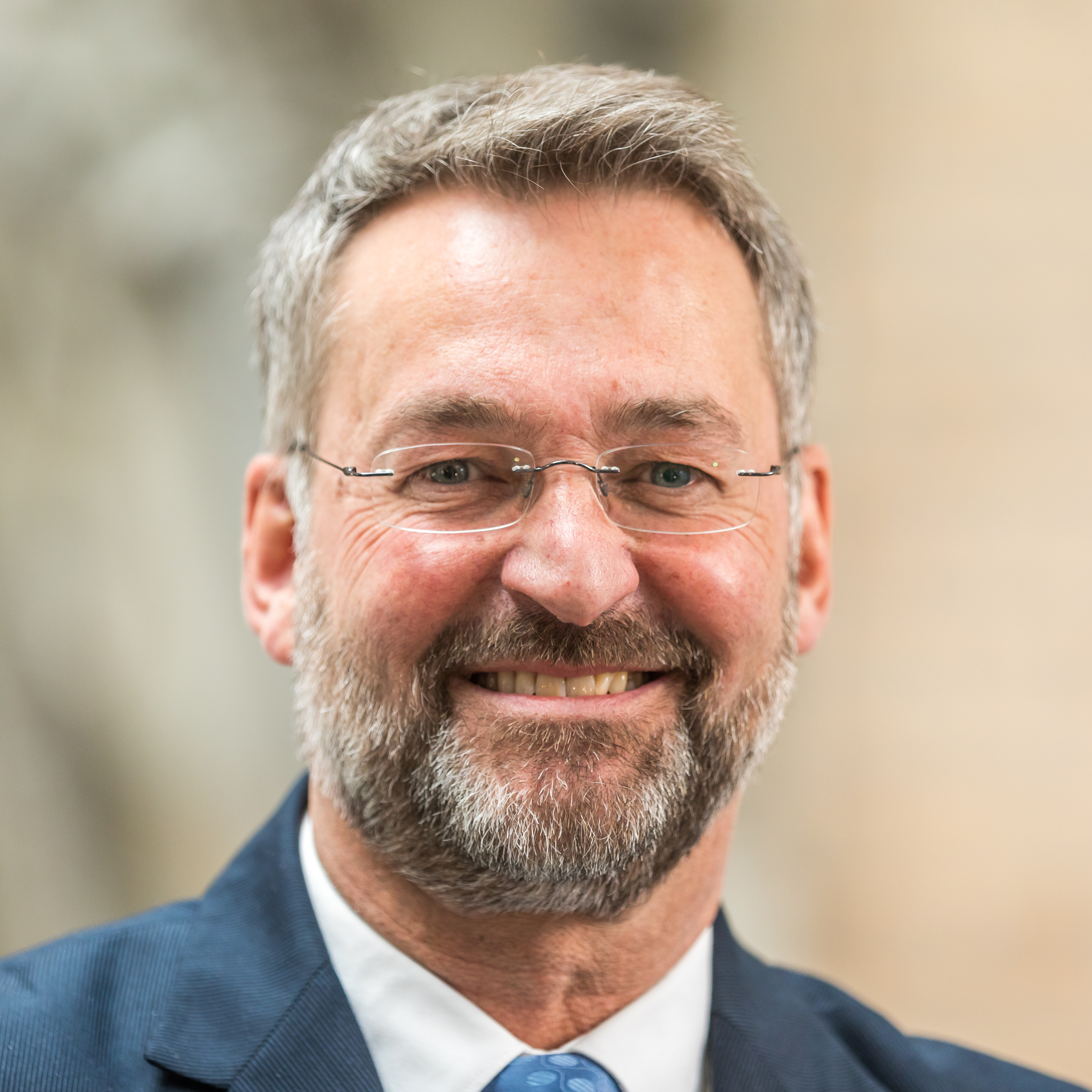
Hein Mulder, 2021

Hein Mulders (born 9 October 1962 in Bussum) is a Dutch cultural manager and intendant of the Saalbau Essen since the beginning of the 2013/14 season.

== Life ==
Mulders studied art history in Paris, archaeology, Italian and musicology as well as art history in Amsterdam. He began his professional career for five years as orchestra manager of the Dutch National Youth Orchestra in Amsterdam and then spent eleven years as casting director of the Vlaamse Opera in Antwerp. He then became artistic director of De Nederlandse Opera Amsterdam.

Since the beginning of the 2013/14 season, Mulders has been in charge of the Aalto-Theater as the successor to Stefan Soltesz and the Philharmonie in Essen. He appointed the Czech Tomáš Netopil as general music director.
