= Dogville (opera) =

2023 opera by Gordon Kampe

Dogville is a 2023 opera by the German composer Gordon Kampe. Adapted from the 2003 film Dogville by Lars von Trier, its story follows an American woman on the run as she initially is taken in and welcomed by the locals of a very small town, but as tension grows, she becomes increasingly bullied and abused. The opera has 18 scenes and a runtime of 110 minutes, compared to the 3 hours of the original film.

Dogville premiered on 11 March 2023 at the Aalto Theatre in Essen under the direction of David Herman and featuring the Essener Philharmoniker conducted by Tomáš Netopil. It was the first ever opera world premiere at the location. The premiere date was originally set to 13 March 2021, but the production was postponed because of the COVID-19 pandemic in Germany.

Premiere cast:

- Tobias Greenhalgh, baritone, as Tom Edison Jr.
- Lavinia Dames, soprano, as Grace
- Bart Driessen, bass, as Thomas Edison Sr.
- Heiko Trinsinger, baritone, as Chuck
- Marie-Helen Joël, mezzo-soprano, as Vera, Chuck's wife
- Almuth Herbst, mezzo-soprano, as Ma Ginger
- Etienne Walch, countertenor, as Bill Henseon
- Maartje Rammeloo, soprano, as Liz Henson
- Alice Lackner, mezzo-soprano, as Martha
- Andrei Nicoara, bass, as Jack McKay
- Christina Clark, soprano, as Olivia
- Rainer Maria Röhr, tenor, as Ben
- Karel Martin Ludvik, bass-baritone, as Big Man
- Albrecht Kludszuweit, tenor, as Policeman
