= Saalbau Essen =

Concert hall in Essen, Germany

Coordinates: 51°26′47″N 7°0′38″E

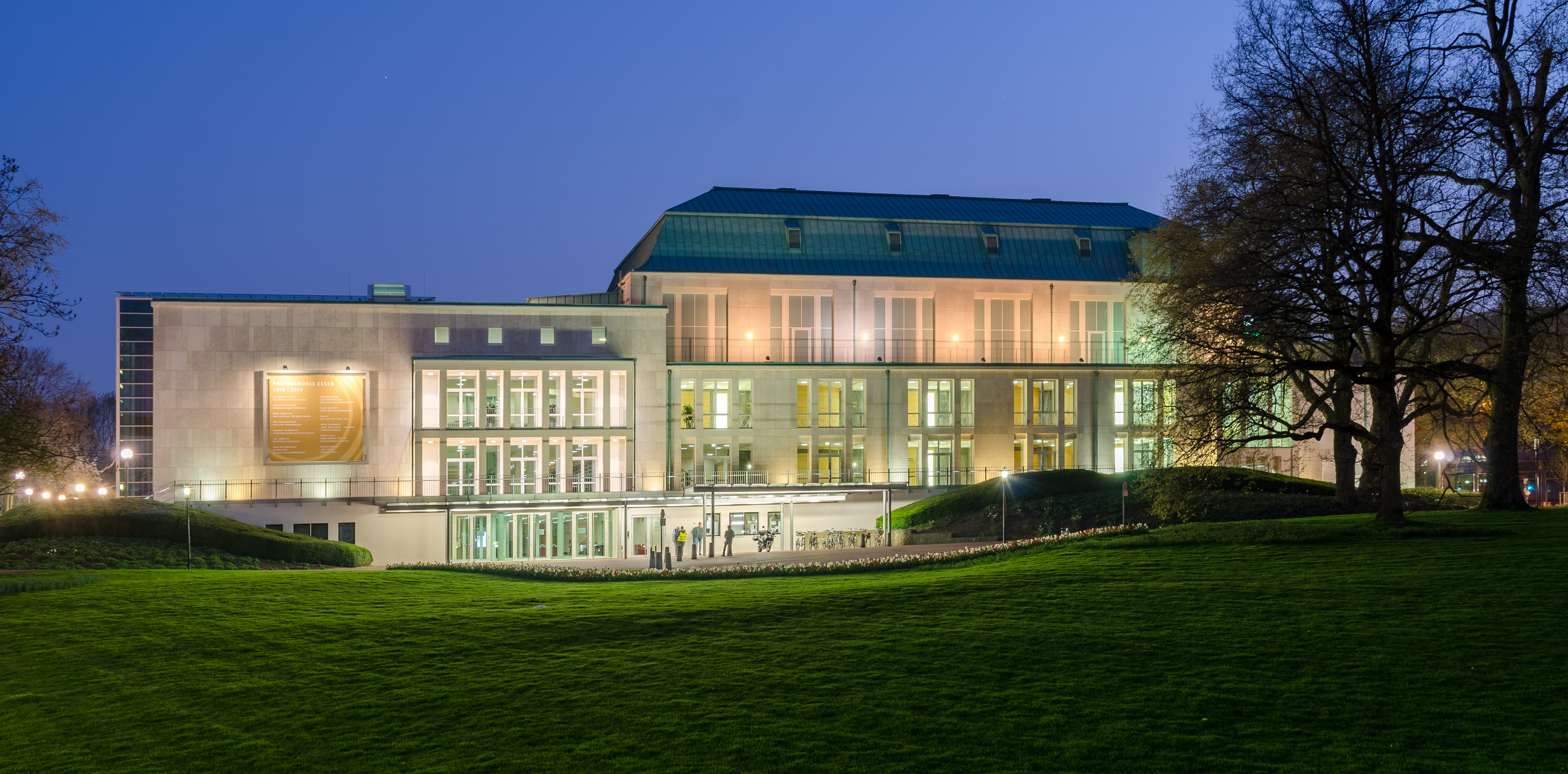
Saalbau Essen, entrance on the left with the RWE-Pavillon behind and the Alfried-Krupp-Saal on the right side

Saalbau Essen is a concert venue in Essen, Germany, the home of the Essen Philharmonic. The original building was completed in 1902, and destroyed during World War II on 26 July 1943. It was rebuilt between 1949 and 1954 and completely renovated in 2003 and 2004. The Saalbau Essen is located a little bit south of the city center close to the Aalto Theatre. Since the 2013/2014 season Tomáš Netopil has been the music director of Essener Philharmonic. Also since 2013/2014 Hein Mulders has been the intendant of the Saalbau Essen.

== History ==
The first concert venue at the same place, the so-called Stadtgartensaal, was opened in 1864. A new concert venue was built in 1901 at the same place – the first Saalbau. Richard Strauss conducted at the opening on 24 September 1904. The design of the building was influenced by the Art Nouveau movement.

Gustav Mahler conducted the world premiere of his 6th Symphony here in 1906 at the 42nd Tonkünstlerfestes (sound artist festival) of the Allgemeiner Deutscher Musikverein, followed by Max Reger in 1913 with the world premiere of his Böcklin Suite. The Saalbau was destroyed in World War II on 26 July 1943 together with the city center of Essen.

After World War II, between 1949 and 1954, a modernized version was rebuilt. The most significant attribute of the building was the copper roof of the building. The white hall (Weiße Saal) got a unique ceramic wall from Charles Crodel.

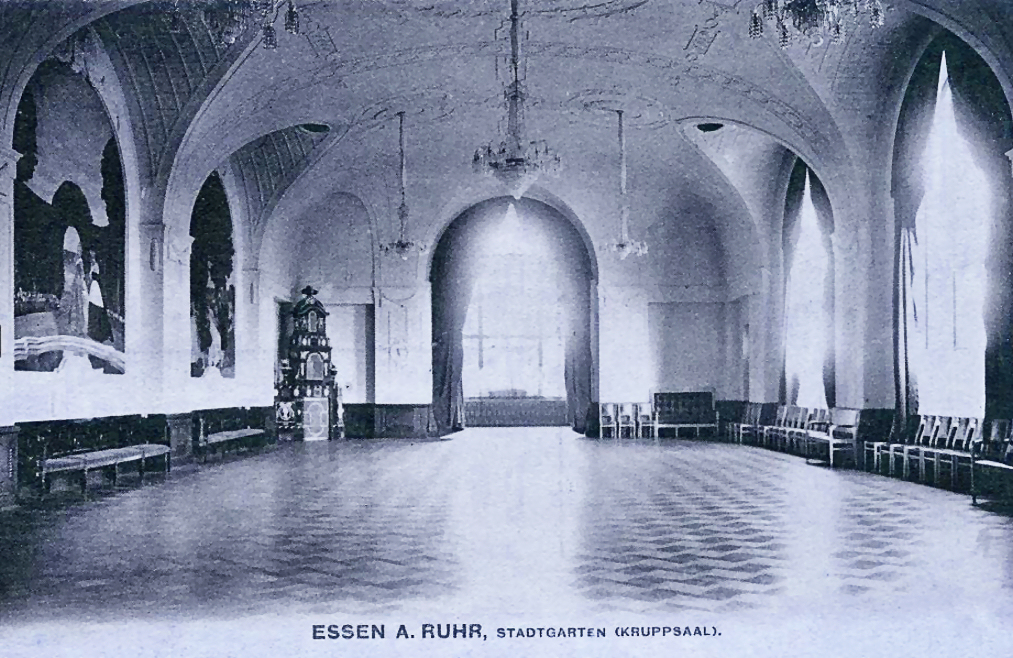
Kruppsaal around 1905

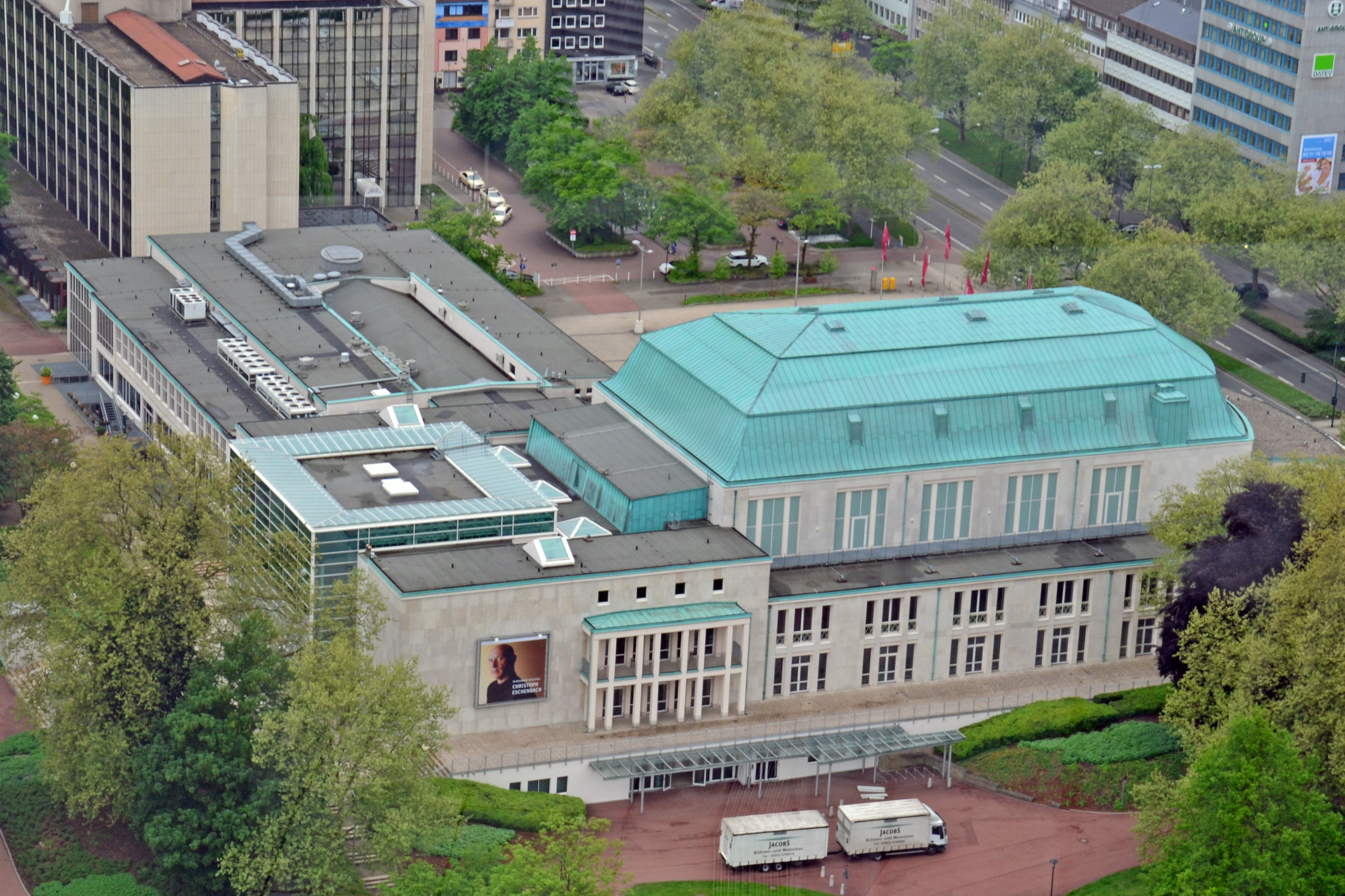
Saalbau from northeast

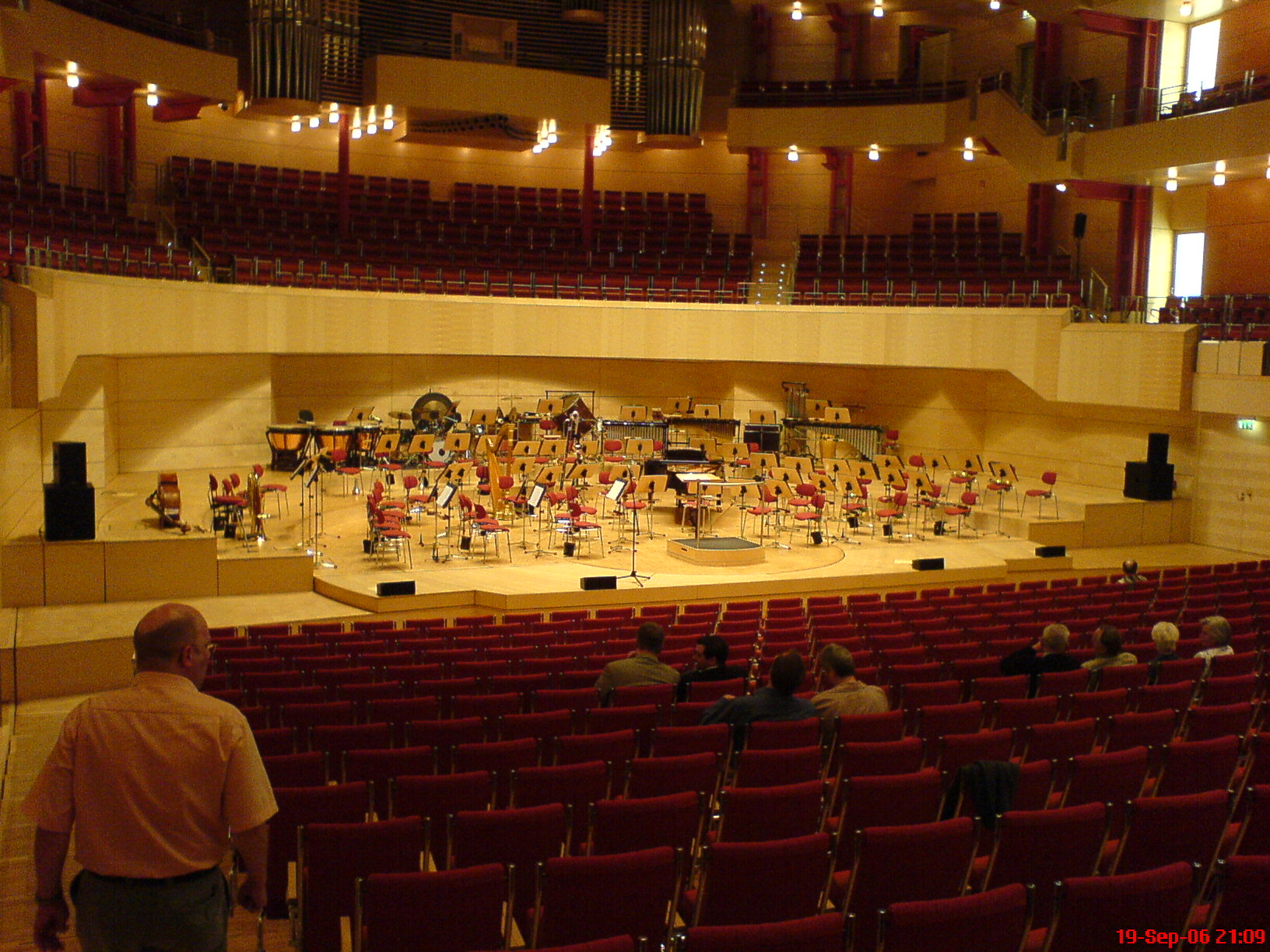
Stage in the Alfried-Krupp-Saal

== Philharmonic today ==
Between 2002 and 2004, the Saalbau was refurbished at the cost of 72 million Euro. During this time, the Alfried-Krupp-Saal was extended at the back side. The building was reopened on 4 June 2004.

=== Entrance and lobby ===
Some parts of the building were converted to the style of the 1950s, for example the entrance and the lobby (Wandelhalle).

At the main entrance are some small box offices, at the top are some historical candleholders. The box offices were used only for a short time, as they are too small and have no IT connection.

The wardrobe side of the lobby is made from marble, the other sides are made from beton.

=== Alfried Krupp Hall ===
The Alfried Krupp Hall (Alfried-Krupp-Saal) is the central and biggest venue. The design consists of bright wood paneling and warm colors. The red steel construction elements are references to the company Krupp

During an acoustic test it was observed that the steel elements should not be covered for acoustical reasons. Therefore, they are still undisguised and visible. The hall has places for 1906 people. The stage size can be adjusted to the size of the ensemble.

The stage together with the parquet can be adjusted in height to the level of the balcony. Then the hall can be used as a ballroom or as a shareholder venue. The acoustic roof has a diameter of 11 metres (36 ft), weighs 18 tonnes (18 long tons; 20 short tons) and can be adjusted in height.

The venue has a height of 21 metres (69 ft), the second balcony starts at a height of 14 metres (46 ft). At the head end of the venue is the pipe organ from Kuhn.

=== RWE Pavilion ===
The installation of the new RWE Pavilion was sponsored by the energy provider RWE and is located between the two staircases of the Saalbau. It is an extension to the historical part of the building. It offers room for up to 400 people. Inside the room are two artworks of the artist Thomas Schütte.

=== Festival room ===
The festival room (Festsaal) offers place for up to 238 people. The wall paneling is made from mahogany and pear wood.

=== Color halls ===
The color halls (Bunte Säle) of the conference centre are above the Wandelhalle. There are yellow, green and white halls with a size between 75 square metres (810 sq ft) and 139 square metres (1,500 sq ft).

The white hall is the medium room. It consists of a ceramic wall from Charles Crodel dating to the 1950s. They are covered with motifs of European myths.

The yellow hall has walls made from citron wood and silk prints by Oswald Petersen in 1954. The prints show the Fürstin-Franziska-Christine-Stiftung and the Golden Madonna of Essen.

The green hall is covered by pear wood. The Bauhaus design was restored during the refurbishment in 2004.

=== Club rooms ===
There are three club rooms (Clubräume) Richard Strauss, Gustav Mahler and Max Reger for up to 44 people.

=== Kuhn organ ===
The organ in the Alfried Krupp Hall was built by Orgelbau Kuhn. The instrument has 62 organ stops (4502 organ pipes) on three manuals and pedal keyboard. The instrument had a price of 1,2 million Euro. The instrument has a weight of roughly 24 tonnes (24 long tons; 26 short tons) a size of 300 cubic metres (390 cu yd). The largest pipe has a size of 4.8 metres (16 ft).

== Critics ==
Critics have repeatedly voted the Essen Philharmonic as Germany's Orchestra of the Year.

== Public transport ==
The Essen Stadtbahn station Philharmonie is located near the Saalbau and named after it.
