= Arnold B. Heine =

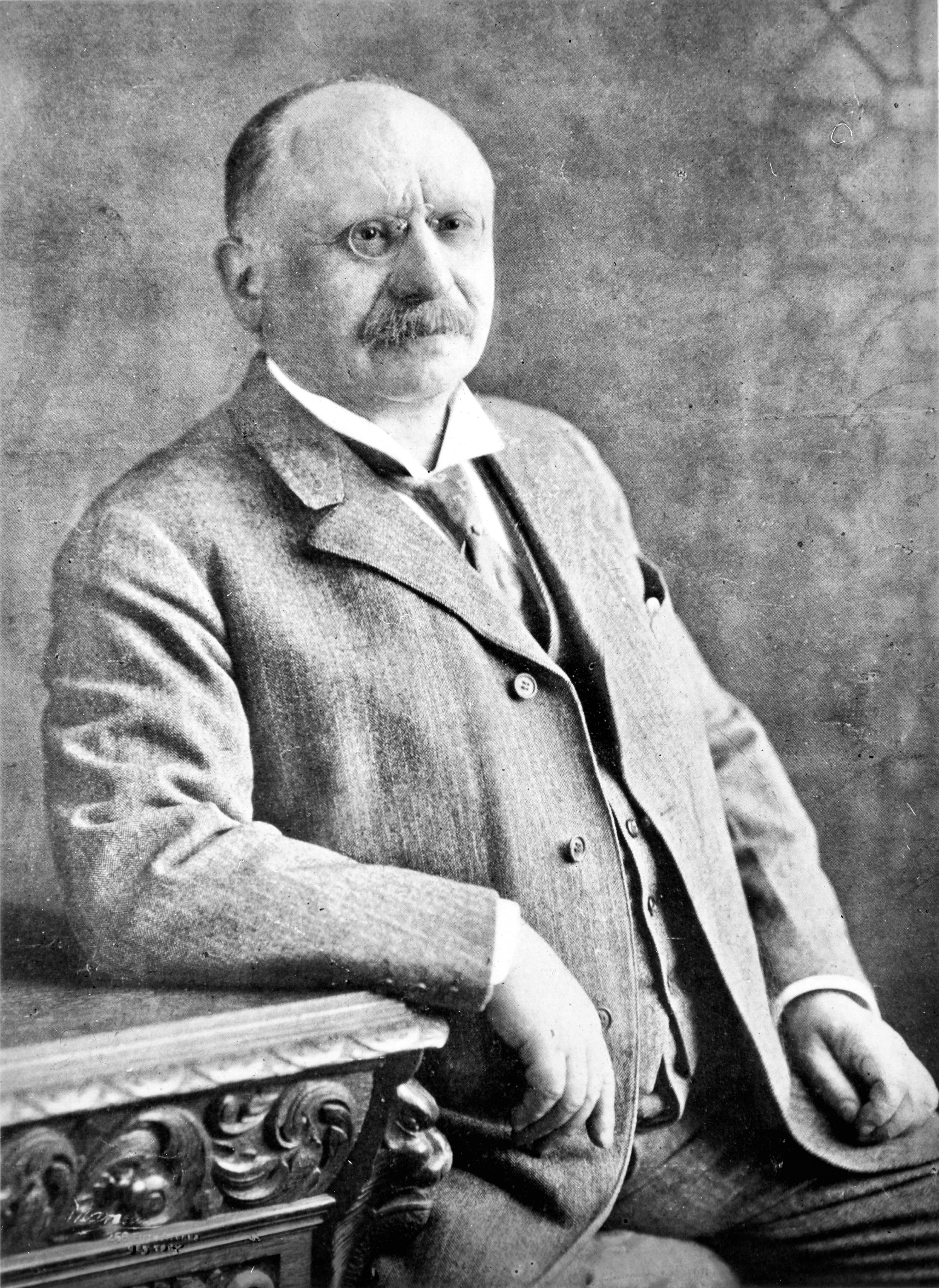
- Born: Arnold Baruch Heine; December 22, 1847; Herford, Province of Westphalia, Kingdom of Prussia
- Died: February 1, 1923 (aged 75); Wiesbaden, Weimar Republic
- Occupations: Industrialist; businessman
- Known for: Founding and leading Heine Embroideries
- Spouse: Clara Falk (m. 1869; died 1913)
- Children: 4

Arnold Bendix Heine (né Arnold Baruch Heine; December 22, 1847 - February 1, 1923) was a German-born American industrialist. He was the founder of Arnold B. Heine & Co, also known as Heine Embroideries, the largest textile concern in the world specializing in embroidery being based in Arbon, Switzerland and New York City.

== Early life and education ==
Heine was born December 22, 1847, in Herford, Province of Westphalia, Kingdom of Prussia to Baruch and Julie (née Lion) Heine. His father originally hailed from Schildesche (today Bielefeld) and primarily worked as teacher, hazzan and shechita. Heine's mother died when he was four and his father remarried to his aunt (the sister of his mother) Friederike. She died in 1859, when Heine was eleven years old. After schooling, Heine completed a commercial apprenticeship. He then worked as an office clerk until his emigration to the US in 1865 at age eighteen.

== Career ==
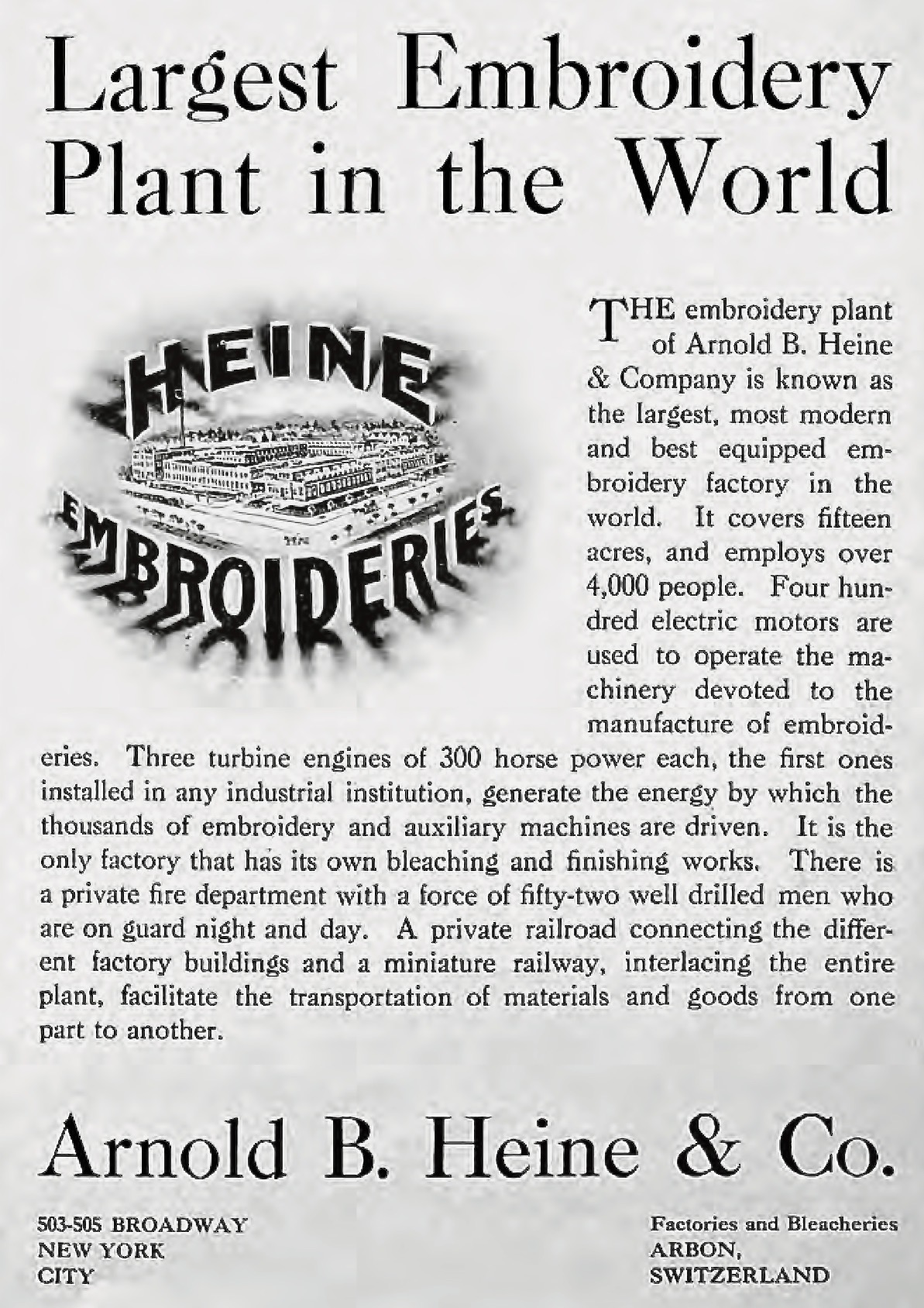
Arnold B. Heine & Co

== Personal life ==
Heine emigrated to the United States around 1865. In 1869, aged 22, Heine married German American Clara Falk (1852-1913), with whom he had four children.

- Louise (1870-1953), married Reinhart
- Camille (1872-1969), married Fogarty
- Benjamin "Ben" (1873-1961)
- Arthur (1874-1953)

They primarily resided in Corning, New York, where Heine also became a United States citizen in 1872.
