= Dogville =

2003 film

- Theatrical release poster
- Directed by: Lars von Trier
- Written by: Lars von Trier
- Produced by: Vibeke Windeløv
- Starring: Nicole Kidman; Lauren Bacall; Jean-Marc Barr; Paul Bettany; James Caan; Patricia Clarkson; Jeremy Davies; Ben Gazzara; Philip Baker Hall; Chloë Sevigny; Stellan Skarsgård; Udo Kier; Shauna Shim; Bill Raymond; Blair Brown; Željko Ivanek; Harriet Andersson; Siobhan Fallon Hogan; Cleo King
- Narrated by: John Hurt
- Cinematography: Anthony Dod Mantle
- Edited by: Molly Marlene Stensgård
- Production companies: Filmek AB; Zoma Films UK; Canal+; France 3 Cinéma
- Distributed by: Nordisk Film (Scandinavia; under Nordisk-Constantin-Fox in Denmark); Icon Film Distribution (United Kingdom); Columbia TriStar Film Distributors International (Sweden); Les Films du Losange (France); Concorde Filmverleih (Germany); A-Film Distribution (Netherlands); Trust Film Sales ApS (International)
- Release dates: 19 May 2003 (Cannes); 26 March 2004 (United States)
- Running time: 178 minutes
- Countries: Denmark; United Kingdom; Sweden; France; Germany
- Language: English
- Budget: $10 million
- Box office: $16.7 million

Dogville is a 2003 experimental arthouse drama film written and directed by Lars von Trier. It features an ensemble cast led by Nicole Kidman, Lauren Bacall, Paul Bettany, Chloë Sevigny, Stellan Skarsgård, Udo Kier, Ben Gazzara, Patricia Clarkson, Harriet Andersson, and James Caan, with John Hurt as the narrator. The film employs an extremely minimal, stage-like set to tell the story of Grace Mulligan (Kidman), a woman on the run from mobsters who finds refuge in the tiny mountain town of Dogville, Colorado, in exchange for physical labor.

The film is the first installment in Trier's incomplete USA: Land of Opportunities trilogy. It was followed by Manderlay (2005), though the intended third part, Washington, was never produced. Dogville premiered in the main competition at the 2003 Cannes Film Festival. After screenings at various film festivals, it received a limited release in the US on 26 March 2004.

Dogville received highly polarized reviews from critics upon its release. While some deemed it pretentious, self-absorbed or exasperating, others hailed it as a work of art, spectacular or masterpiece. Over time, the film has grown in stature and was included in the 2016 BBC poll of the greatest films since 2000. Filmmakers such as Quentin Tarantino and Denis Villeneuve have praised the film.

== Plot ==
=== PROLOGUE ===
(which introduces us to the town and its residents)

Set in the 1930s, in the isolated Rocky Mountain town of Dogville, near an abandoned silver mine, the film opens with a narrator introducing its 15 residents. Through the perspective of Tom Edison Jr., an idealistic philosopher who organizes meetings on "moral rearmament," the townsfolk are depicted as quaint but flawed. Tom aspires to replace his elderly physician father as the community's moral leader.

=== Chapter ONE ===
In which Tom hears gunfire and meets Grace

Tom encounters Grace Mulligan, a fugitive fleeing gangsters. After hiding her in the mine, he convinces her to stay, arguing the mountains are impassable. When gangsters arrive searching for Grace, Tom lies about her whereabouts and receives a business card after being told of a big reward for finding Grace. At a town meeting, Tom proposes sheltering Grace as a test of their morality. The skeptical residents agree to a two-week trial, during which Grace must earn their trust.

=== Chapter TWO ===
In which Grace follows Tom's plan and embarks upon physical labour

Grace approaches the townspeople, but they refrain from the interaction. Grace and Tom convene at the town's shop at the end of the unsuccessful day, and Tom suggests Grace help out the shopkeeper with work she would like done but is not necessary. They settle on weeding the gooseberry bushes by the bench. One chore leads to another; Grace begins helping the townspeople: comforting blind recluse Jack McKay by becoming his conversation partner, babysitting for Chuck and Vera, assisting shopkeeper Ma Ginger, providing Ben with food and a sense of domesticity, helping handicapped Olivier to the toilet, and turning the page for Martha when she practices on the organ. Her willingness to help softens initial reluctance, and she gradually integrates into Dogville. Chuck has the most resistance to Grace, which Grace discovered is due to them having similar backgrounds of leaving the town and finding themselves in Dogville.

=== Chapter THREE ===
In which Grace indulges in a shady piece of provocation

Grace bonds with Jack, who pretends to see. She tricks him into admitting his blindness, earning his respect. After the trial period during the vote, Grace is packing her baggage. She discovered that even though she may not have fully convinced all the townspeople, she certainly has friends who secretly left maps, bread, knives, and other trinkets required for escaping Dogville in her luggage. The town votes unanimously to let her stay.

=== Chapter FOUR ===
"Happy times in Dogville"

Grace continues her work, helping the townfolks, saving wages to buy porcelain Hummel figurines from Ma Ginger. Weeks pass and she triumphantly moves into the town's abandoned mill, restored by Tom and Ben. Tensions rise when police post a "Missing" notice with Grace's name. Though divided on cooperating, the town opts to protect her, as the notice did only mention she is missing without other information.

=== Chapter FIVE ===
"Fourth of July after all"

During Fourth of July celebrations, Tom confesses his love for Grace, and she reciprocates warmly. The mood sours when police replace the notice with a "Wanted" poster, accusing Grace of bank robbery where the time of the crime does not match. The town insists she's innocent but demands more labor as a quid pro quo. Reluctantly, Grace agrees. Grace visits the townfolks twice a day and has a symbolic pay cut.

=== Chapter SIX ===
In which Dogville bares its teeth

Grace's expanded workload strains relations. Mistakes invite scorn: men sexually harass her, women grow abusive, and Vera's son Jason manipulates Grace into spanking him. The abuse culminates in Chuck threatening and raping Grace when the FBI visits Dogville.

=== Chapter SEVEN ===
In which Grace finally gets enough of Dogville, leaves the town, and again sees the light of day

Grace confides in Tom, who decides to plan her escape. Vera found out about the spanking, while Martha exposed Chuck's assault to Vera. Angered, Vera smashes Grace's figurines, mocking her Stoic teachings. Tom's plan is for trucker Ben to smuggle Grace out, and he has borrowed his father's money to pay Ben. Ben, instead, rapes Grace and returns her to Dogville. Blamed for Tom's theft of his father's money, Grace is enslaved, chained, raped, and tormented by the town, including the children, who mock her suffering by ringing the church bells every time she is raped.

=== Chapter EIGHT ===
In which there is a meeting where the truth is told and Tom leaves (only to return later)

At a town meeting, Grace details her abuse, prompting residents to vote to remove her from the town. But there is a problem with her spreading the ill-being of Dogville; they wanted Tom to think of a better solution. Tom, feigning loyalty, attempts to sleep with her but is rebuffed. Realizing his hypocrisy, he betrays Grace by retrieving the reward card and calling her pursuers. Resigned, Grace mutters, "Nobody's gonna sleep here"—echoing Pirate Jenny's vengeance anthem.

=== Chapter NINE ===
In which Dogville receives the long-awaited visit and the film ends

The gangsters arrive, led by Grace's father. Revealed as a mob boss's daughter, Grace initially resists his harsh worldview but, after introspection, condemns Dogville. She orders the town's annihilation: Vera must watch her children die unless she stifles tears, echoing her own torment. Dogville is razed, its residents massacred. Tom, applauding Grace's "illustration" is executed by her. Only the dog Moses—whose bone Grace once took—is spared.

The credits roll over Jacob Holdt's stark photos of American poverty, set to "Young Americans" by David Bowie.

== Cast ==
- John Hurt as Narrator
- Nicole Kidman as Grace Margaret Mulligan
- Lauren Bacall as Ma Ginger
- Paul Bettany as Tom Edison, Jr.
- Chloë Sevigny as Liz Henson
- Stellan Skarsgård as Chuck
- Jean-Marc Barr as The Man with the Big Hat
- Udo Kier as The Man in the Coat
- Ben Gazzara as Jack McKay
- James Caan as The Big Man
- Patricia Clarkson as Vera
- Shauna Shim as June
- Bill Raymond as Mr. Henson
- Jeremy Davies as Bill Henson
- Philip Baker Hall as Tom Edison, Sr.
- Blair Brown as Mrs. Henson
- Željko Ivanek as Ben
- Harriet Andersson as Gloria
- Siobhan Fallon Hogan as Martha
- Cleo King as Olivia
- Miles Purinton as Jason

== Pilot ==
Dogville: The Pilot was shot during 2001 in the pre-production phase to test whether the concept of chalk lines and sparse scenery would work. The 15-minute pilot film starred Danish actors Sidse Babett Knudsen (as Grace) and Nikolaj Lie Kaas (as Tom). Eventually Lars von Trier was happy with the overall results. Thus, he and the producers decided to move forward with the production of the feature film. The test pilot was never shown in public, but is featured on the second disc of the Dogville (2003) DVD, released in November 2003.

== Staging ==
The story of Dogville is narrated by John Hurt in nine chapters and takes place on a stage with minimalist scenery. Some walls and furniture are placed on the stage, but the rest of the scenery exists merely as white painted outlines which have big labels on them; for example, the outlines of gooseberry bushes have the text "Gooseberry Bushes" written next to them. While this form of staging is common in black box theaters, it has rarely been attempted on film before—the Western musical Red Garters (1954) and Vanya on 42nd Street (1994) being notable exceptions. The bare staging serves to focus the audience's attention on the acting and storytelling, and also reminds them of the film's artificiality. As such it is heavily influenced by the theatre of Bertolt Brecht. (There are also similarities between the song "Seeräuberjenny" ("Pirate Jenny") in Brecht and Kurt Weill's Die Dreigroschenoper (The Threepenny Opera) and the story of Dogville.

The film was shot on high-definition video using a Sony HDW-F900 camera in a studio in Trollhättan, Sweden.

== Interpretations ==
According to Trier, the point of the film is that "evil can arise anywhere, as long as the situation is right".

Film review show At the Movies with Ebert & Roeper criticized Dogville as having a strongly anti-American message, citing, for example, the closing credits sequence with images of poverty-stricken Americans which were taken from Jacob Holdt's documentary book American Pictures (1984), and accompanied by David Bowie's song "Young Americans".

== Reception ==
=== Critical response ===
Dogville polarised critics upon its United States theatrical release, with Metacritic giving it a score of 61 ("Generally favourable reviews") and the Rotten Tomatoes critics' consensus for it stating simply, "A challenging piece of experimental filmmaking." 70% of critics gave the film a positive review, with an average score of 7/10, based on 168 reviews. Many hailed it as an innovative and powerful artistic statement, while others considered it to be an emotionally detached or even misanthropic work. In The Village Voice, J. Hoberman wrote, "For passion, originality, and sustained chutzpah, this austere allegory of failed Christian charity and Old Testament payback is von Trier's strongest movie—a masterpiece, in fact." Peter Travers of Rolling Stone gave the film 3.5/4 stars, praising Kidman's performance and dubbing it "a movie that never met a cliche it didn't stomp on." Scott Foundas of LA Weekly described it as a work of "boldness, cutting insight, [and] intermittent hilarity", and interpreted it as "a potent parable of human suffering." In Empire, Alan Morrison wrote that "Dogville, in a didactic and politicised stage tradition, is a great play that shows a deep understanding of human beings as they really are."

In the Los Angeles Times, on the other hand, Manohla Dargis dismissed it as "three hours of tedious experimentation." Richard Corliss of Time argued that Trier lacked humanity and wrote that the director "presumably wants us to attend to his characters' yearnings and prejudices without the distractions of period furnishings. It's a brilliant idea, for about 10 minutes. Then the bare set is elbowed out of a viewer's mind by the threadbare plot and characterizations." Roger Ebert, who gave it two out of four stars, felt that the film was so pedantic as to make Trier comparable to a crank, and viewed it as "a demonstration of how a good idea can go wrong." In the Seattle Post-Intelligencer, Sean Axmaker said, "There's no denying von Trier is visually intriguing. ... But as an artist, his contempt for humanity is becoming harder to hide with stylistic flourish." Charles Taylor of Salon additionally responded to allegations of the film's anti-Americanism with the charge that it was "anti-human", and said that it was "as total a misanthropic vision as anything control freak Stanley Kubrick ever turned out"—while personally admitting that he felt Trier was as deliberate a filmmaker as Kubrick.

Later, Dogville was named one of the greatest films of its decade in The Guardian, The List, and Paste. In 2016, it was ranked one of the 100 greatest motion pictures in a critics' poll conducted by BBC Culture. It was listed the 37th best film of the same time period by The Guardian critics.

American director and screenwriter Quentin Tarantino has named the film as one of the 20 best to have been released during the time of his active career as a director; (which was between 1992 and 2009 when he was interviewed) he said that if it had been written for the stage, Trier would have won a Pulitzer Prize.

=== Box office ===
The film grossed $1,535,286 in the US market and $15,145,550 from the rest of the world for a total gross of $16,680,836 worldwide. In the opening US weekend it did poorly, grossing only $88,855. The movie was released in only nine theaters, with an average of $9,872 per theater. In Denmark, the film grossed $1,231,984. The highest-grossing country was Italy, with $3,272,119.

=== "Best-of" lists ===
Dogville made many 2004 top-ten lists:

- 1st – Mark Kermode, BBC Radio 5 Live
- 2nd – J. Hoberman, The Village Voice
- 3rd – Overall, The Village Voice
- 4th – Dennis Lim, The Village Voice
- 5th – Jack Mathews, New York Daily News
- 8th – J. R. Jones, Chicago Reader
- n/a – David Sterritt, The Christian Science Monitor
- n/a – Ron Stringer, LA Weekly

The film received nine votes (with six from critics and three from directors) in the 2012 Sight & Sound polls.

In July 2025, it ranked number 60 on Rolling Stone's list of "The 100 Best Movies of the 21st Century."

=== Accolades ===
Award	Category	Recipients	Result
Bodil Awards	Best Danish Film	Lars von Trier	Won
Bodil Awards	Best Actress	Nicole Kidman	Nominated
Bodil Awards	Best Supporting Actor	Stellan Skarsgård	Nominated
Robert Award	Best Costume Design	Manon Rasmussen	Won
Robert Award	Best Screenplay	Lars von Trier	Won
Robert Award	Best Editor	Molly Marlene Stensgård	Nominated
Robert Award	Best Film	Lars von Trier	Nominated
Robert Award	Best Cinematography	Anthony Dod Mantle	Nominated
Robert Award	Best Production Design	Peter Grant	Nominated
Robert Award	Best Supporting Actor	Stellan Skarsgård	Nominated
Robert Award	Best Director	Lars von Trier	Nominated
Cannes Film Festival	Palme d'Or	Lars von Trier	Nominated
Cannes Film Festival	Palm Dog Award	Moses	Won
European Film Awards	Best Cinematographer	Anthony Dod Mantle	Won
European Film Awards	Best Film	Lars von Trier	Nominated
European Film Awards	Best Director	Lars von Trier	Won
European Film Awards	Best Screenwriter	Lars von Trier	Nominated
Goya Awards	Best European Film	Lars von Trier	Nominated
Russian Guild of Film Critics	Russian Guild of Film Critics Golden Aries Award for Best Foreign Actress	Nicole Kidman	Won
Russian Guild of Film Critics	Best Foreign Film	Lars von Trier	Won
Italian National Syndicate of Film Journalists	Best Director	Lars von Trier	Nominated
Guldbagge Award	Best Foreign Film	Lars von Trier	Nominated
Golden Eagle Award	Best Foreign Language Film	Lars von Trier	Nominated
Golden Trailer Awards	Best Independent	Lars von Trier	Nominated
David di Donatello	Best European Film	Lars von Trier	Won
Copenhagen International Film Festival	Honorary Award	Lars von Trier	Won
Cinema Brazil Grand Prize	Best Foreign Film	Lars von Trier	Won
Cinema Writers Circle Awards, Spain	Best Foreign Film	Lars von Trier	Won
Guild of German Art House Cinemas	Best Foreign Film	Lars von Trier	Won
Sofia International Film Festival	Best Film	Lars von Trier	Won

== Adaptations ==
The opera adaptation Dogville was composed by Gordon Kampe and premiered in 2023 at the Aalto Theatre in Essen. The premiere was postponed two years due to the COVID-19 pandemic in Germany. The story is compressed to a runtime of 110 minutes. In March of 2026, the JK Tyl Theatre in Plzeň, Czech Republic will present Christian Lollike's play adapation.

== See also ==
- The Visit (1964 film)
- Pirate Jenny's English lyrics

== Sources / Further Reading ==
- Tiefenbach, Georg (2010). Drama und Regie: Lars von Triers Breaking the Waves, Dancer in the Dark, Dogville. Würzburg: Königshausen & Neumann. ISBN 978-3-8260-4096-2.
- Tiefenbach, Georg (2025). The Lars von Trier Conversations. Volume One. About the Art of Filmmaking: Editing, Sound Design, and Costume Design. Conversations with Molly Malene Stensgaard, Per Streit, and Manon Rasmussen. Königshausen & Neumann. ISBN 978-3-8260-9039-4
