= Bruehl (surname) =

Bruehl is a surname. Notable people with the surname include:

- Anton Bruehl (1900–1982), Australian-born American photographer
- Elisabeth Young-Bruehl (1946–2011), American academic and psychotherapist
- Thierry Bruehl (born 1968), French-German theatre, music theatre and film director
