= Ellersieker Bach =

River in Germany

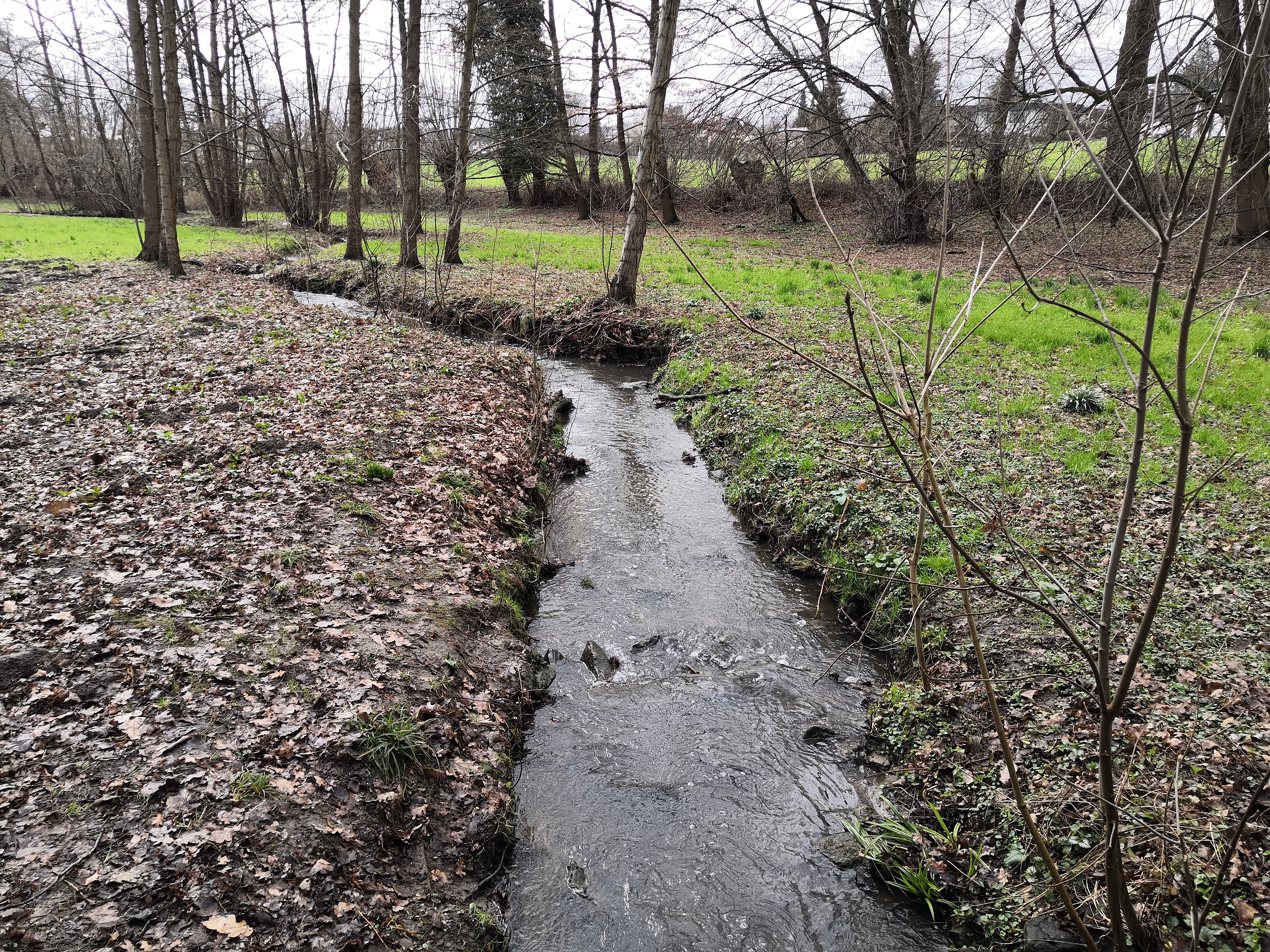

Location
- Country: Germany
- State: North Rhine-Westphalia

Physical characteristics
- Mouth
  - location: Werre
  - coordinates: 52.1061°N 8.6861°E

Basin features
- Progression: Werre→ Weser→ North Sea

Ellersieker Bach is a river of North Rhine-Westphalia, Germany. It is 2.8 km long and flows into the Werre in Herford.

== See also ==
- List of rivers of North Rhine-Westphalia
