= Vivani =

Chocolate manufacturer

Coordinates: 52.1161°N 8.6577°E

Vivani Organic Chocolate is a brand of chocolate created by EcoFinia GmbH, a subsidiary of Ludwig Weinrich GmbH & Co. KG., based in Herford, Germany. First introduced in 2000 at the international organic food fair, BioFach, Vivani chocolate is predominantly sold in organic supermarkets and shops, where it claims market leadership in organic chocolate bars.

== Products ==
The Vivani range comprises over 20 different types of chocolate bar, many of which have unusual flavours such as "Fine Dark Chocolate with Green Tea and Mango", "Fine Dark Chocolate with Orange" and "White Chocolate with Mango and Coconut". In addition, Vivani manufactures numerous other chocolate products. These include, amongst other things, coatings, smaller, individual chocolate bars, drinking chocolate and chocolate snacks, as well as a chocolate spread. The product range is expanded further by chocolate bars manufactured under license in conjunction with the "Felix" series of children's books, published by Coppenrath.

In the past, various Vivani products have received a Gold Award in the quality control testing of the DLG (Deutsche Landwirtschaftsgesellschaft), the German Agricultural Society. In addition, the "Fine Dark Chocolate with Orange" variety was awarded the "Best of Bio" award in 2005.

A special feature of Vivani products is their elaborate packaging design. The artist, Annette Wessel, from Castrop-Rauxel, creates an abstract painting for the packaging of each variety of chocolate bar. Each painting aims to recreate the essence of the chocolate in visual form.

Vivani claims to be the German market leader for organic chocolate bars and quotes bioVista GmbH, a market data provider for the organic market, as proof of this.

At the beginning of 2010, Vivani introduced the brand iChoc onto the market. iChoc's catchy slogan "It’s Music" and trendy design means that it particularly appeals to teenage customers. The iChoc products are also made purely organically, however, in contrast to the family brand, they are sold in the regular trade, as well as at kiosks and petrol stations.

== Production ==
Vivani organic chocolate consists entirely of organically farmed ingredients, which are strictly controlled by European organic regulations. Furthermore, the cocoa for the chocolate products comes exclusively from small-scale farming cooperatives in Ecuador and the Dominican Republic. In the manufacturing process, Vivani does not use emulsifiers, such as soya lecithin, which are often extracted from genetically modified soya beans. Raw cane sugar is always used as a sweetener.

== Distribution ==
Vivani chocolates are exported to over 40 countries worldwide. In addition to specialist organic shops, Vivani can also be purchased via various online shops.
