= Stefan Soltész =

Hungarian-born Austrian conductor (1949–2022)

- Born: Soltész István; 6 January 1949; Nyíregyháza, Hungary
- Died: 22 July 2022 (aged 73); Munich, Germany
- Education: Wiener Musikakademie
- Occupation: Conductor
- Years active: 1971–2022

Stefan Soltész (born István Soltész, Hungarian: [ˈʃolteːs]; 6 January 1949 – 22 July 2022) was a Hungarian-born Austrian conductor. Trained in Vienna, from 1997 to 2013 he was artistic director of the Aalto Theatre and Generalmusikdirektor in Essen, leading the opera house to international recognition.

== Life ==
Soltész was born as István Soltész (Hungarian: Soltész István) in Nyíregyháza, Hungary, on 6 January 1949 and received piano lessons from age four. He came to Vienna in 1956, where he became a member of the Wiener Sängerknaben at age ten. He studied piano, conducting and composition at the Wiener Musikakademie beginning at age 14, conducting with Hans Swarowsky.

In 1971 he began his career as Kapellmeister at the Theater an der Wien, followed by engagements as répétiteur and conductor, at the Vienna State Opera from 1973 to 1983, and as guest conductor at the Graz Opera from 1979 to 1981. At the Salzburg Festivals of 1978, 1979 and 1983, he worked as a musical assistant to Karl Böhm, Christoph von Dohnányi and Herbert von Karajan.

Soltész was conductor at the Hamburg State Opera from 1983 to 1985, and at the Deutsche Oper Berlin from 1985 to 1997. He worked as Generalmusikdirektor (GMD) at the Staatstheater Braunschweig from 1988 to 1993, and as chief conductor at the Flemish Opera from 1992 to 1997 in Antwerp and Gent.

From 1997 until the end of the 2012/13 season, Soltész was both artistic director and GMD of the Aalto-Theater in Essen. The opera house was voted "Opera House of the Year" by Opernwelt in 2008, and the Essen Philharmonic orchestra was named "Orchestra of the Year" in 2003 and 2008.

Soltész was a regular guest conductor at the European opera houses such as the Vienna State Opera, the Bavarian State Opera, Oper Frankfurt, Teatro dell'Opera di Roma, the Budapest State Opera, the Teatr Wielki in Warsaw, the Bolshoi Theatre in Moscow and the Grand Théâtre de Genève. He made guest appearances at the Paris Opera and the Zurich Opera House, Het Muziektheater in Amsterdam, the Teatro Massimo Bellini in Catania, at the Bilbao Opera, at the Teatro Colón in Buenos Aires, in Japan, Taiwan, at the Washington and San Francisco Opera, and the Royal Opera House. He conducted at festivals such as Festival de Radio France et Montpellier, Aix-en-Provence Festival and Savonlinna, the Baden-Baden Pfingstfestspiele, Anima Mundi in Pisa, the Tongyeong Festival in Korea and the Glyndebourne Festival.

On 22 July 2022, Soltész collapsed while conducting a performance of Richard Strauss’s Die schweigsame Frau at the National Theatre Munich. He subsequently died at a nearby hospital at the age of 73.

== Personal life ==
Soltész was married to Michaela Selinger, a mezzo soprano.

== Recordings ==
Soltész conducted recordings such as excerpts from Puccini's La Bohème, Giuseppe Gazzaniga's Don Giovanni and Alexander von Zemlinsky's Der Kreidekreis, as well as arias and songs with Grace Bumbry, Lucia Popp and Dietrich Fischer-Dieskau. In 2010, he recorded the Alban Berg's Lulu Suite and Hans Werner Henze's Appassionatamente plus with the Essen Philharmonic and soprano Julia Bauer, as part of the Ruhr being European Capital of Culture in 2010. The album was nominated for Grammy and ICMA awards.

== Awards ==
- 2009 Citizen of the Ruhr District
- 2012 Honorary conductor of the Staatsorchester Braunschweig
- 2013 Honorary professor of North Rhine-Westphalia
