= Rolf Weinberg =

Rolf Weinberg (6 March 1919 – 23 June 2011) was a German-born Second World War veteran who fought with the Free French Forces. He was the highest decorated Jewish officer in the Free French, having been awarded the Médaille militaire.

== Early life ==
Weinberg was born in the small Westphalian town of Herford in Germany to a Jewish family. His father was an Iron Cross decorated veteran of the Great War, and the director of the family's local chocolate factory.

In 1936, Weinberg's mother secured him the position of an apprentice in a knitting machine factory of a Jewish family in Stuttgart, where he gained experience in office administration. He enrolled in a course in textile engineering at a technical college in Reutlingen, to receive his engineering diploma in 1938.

In September of that year, Weinberg was tipped off that he was about to be arrested by the Gestapo. He managed to avoid capture, quickly moving to Hamburg before leaving for Montevideo, Uruguay at the age of 19.

== World War II ==
=== In Montevideo ===
In December 1939, Weinberg became personally involved in the naval Battle of the River Plate. Omitting his Jewish background and passing as a regular German immigrant, he was approached by the British Embassy and given the mission to feed false information to the crew of the German pocket battleship Admiral Graf Spee that an overwhelming British force was being assembled, and that it was futile to attempt to leave Montevideo Bay. Being deceived by the false intelligence, the Graf Spee's captain, Hans Langsdorff, decided to scuttle the ship.

=== Free French service ===
Afterwards, Weinberg joined the Free French, where he was known by the name of Henri Rovey. He fought on several fronts, including the North African Campaign, under the command of Marie Pierre Koenig, and on the Gustav Line.

In July 1943, he and others took arms captured from the Afrika Korps and gave them to the Haganah; he met with Moshe Dayan at this time. Weinberg also participated in several top secret missions for the Allies.

The nature of several of these missions are considered top secret even today.

Weinberg is considered by the Allies as a war hero, having received several high decorations from both British and French governments.

== Awards ==
- Croix de Guerre
- Chevalier de la Legion d'Honneur

== Post-war ==
He wrote his memoirs in a book entitled David's Fight under the pseudonym of David Silverbaum. He died on 23 June 2011 aged 92.

== See also ==
- Battle of the River Plate
- Free French Forces
