= Heinrich von Herford =

Heinrich von Herford (also Heinrich von Hervord, Henricus de Hervordia), anglicized as Henry of Herford (c. 1300 – 9 October 1370), was a Dominican friar, chronicler, historian, and theologian.

== Biography ==
Born around 1300 in Herford, Westphalia, then part of the Holy Roman Empire, Heinrich probably attended the Latin school of the Imperial Abbey, today the Friedrichs-Gymnasium Herford. He was then professed in into the Dominican friary at Minden. There he wrote his chronicle Liber de rebus memorabilioribus (A Book of Memorable Things), in which he summarizes the work of earlier historians from Eusebius down to the writers of his own age. The work, which is continued down to the coronation of the Emperor Charles IV in 1355, was one of the chief sources of historical information in fourteenth-century literature. It was reprinted under the editorship of August Potthast in Göttingen in 1859. He also composed the Catena aurea in decem partes distincta, a summary of theology, and a treatise, De Conceptione Virginis gloriosae.

Heinrich of Herford died on 9 October 1370 in the Dominican monastery of St. Paul in Minden, where he had spent most of his life. Heinrich's writings must have earned him some fame, as shortly after his death the Emperor Charles IV arranged for the transfer of Heinrich's remains to a more honourable tomb and also provided for a large funeral, attended by a number of people of secular and spiritual significance.

== Literature ==
- August Potthast: Liber de rebus memorabilioribus sive chronicon Henrici de Hervordia. Göttingen 1859
- Anette Baumann: Weltchronistik im ausgehenden Mittelalter. Heinrich von Herford, Gobelinus Person, Dietrich Engelhus. Lang, Frankfurt am Main u.a. 1995, ISBN 3-631-48288-4
- Klaus Peter Schumann: Wundergeschichten des Mindener Dominikaners Heinrich von Herford. Mitteilungen des Mindener Geschichtsvereins, Jahrgang 55 (1983), S. 87-102.
- Klaus Peter Schumann: Heinrich von Herford. Enzyklopädische Gelehrsamkeit und universalhistorische Konzeption im Dienste dominikanischer Studienbedürfnisse, Münster 1996 (Quellen und Forschungen zur Kirchen- und Religionsgeschichte 4 = Veröffentlichungen der Historischen Kommission für Westfalen 44/4), ISBN 3-402-06889-3
- Friedrich Wilhelm Bautz (1990). "Heinrich von Herford". In Bautz, Friedrich Wilhelm (ed.). Biographisch-Bibliographisches Kirchenlexikon (BBKL) (in German). Vol. 2. Hamm: Bautz. col. 667. ISBN 3-88309-032-8.
- Klemens Honselmann (1969). "Heinrich von Herford". Neue Deutsche Biographie (in German). Vol. 8. Berlin: Duncker & Humblot. pp. 411–411.
