= Wiglaf Droste =

German writer (1961–2019)

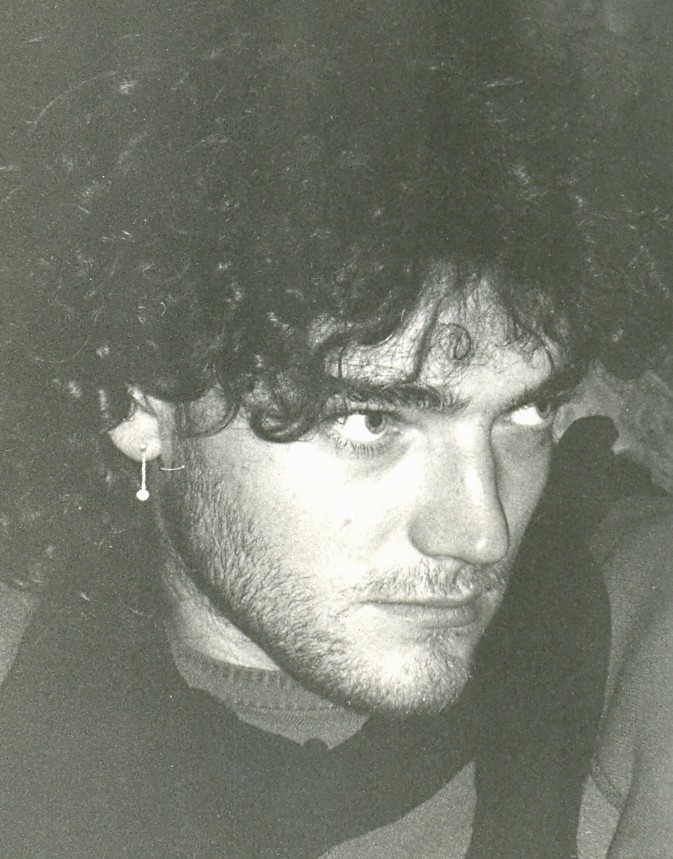
- Wiglaf Droste in 1980
- Born: 27 June 1961 Herford, West Germany
- Died: 15 May 2019 (aged 57) Pottenstein, Germany
- Occupation: Novelist, writer, publicist, songwriter, singer, satirist
- Genre: Satire

Wiglaf Droste (German pronunciation: [ˈʋiːklaf ˈdʁɔstə]; 27 June 1961 – 15 May 2019) was an award-winning German poet, writer, songwriter, publicist, author and singer who was best known as a satirist.

== Early life ==
Droste was the son of a teacher. In 1983 he moved to West Berlin to study journalism and communication studies, but he dropped out after only a few weeks.

== Life and career ==
In the 1980s Droste worked for various newspapers and wrote for the Berlin taz and the satire magazine Titanic. In 1989, Droste first appeared as a writer with his book Kommunikaze. In 1991 he and his friend the author Michael Stein founded the "Benno-Ohnesorg-Theater" (which is named after the Shooting of Benno Ohnesorg) at the Berlin Volksbühne, to offer young satirical talents a platform for topical political evening entertainment. He has been frequently compared with writers such as Kurt Tucholsky by fans for his sharp-tongued polemics. But he was always vigorously criticized for going too far. Since 1994 he wrote for the newspaper Junge Welt. From 2000 to 2009 he also wrote for the Berliner Tagesspiegel. From 1999 to 2013 he published the quarterly culinary magazine Häuptling Eigener Herd (meaning "Chief Own Hearth") with his friend Vincent Klink. Together they wrote a humorous book on the subject of sausages in 2006. From 1989 to 2014 he published numerous records as a singer/songwriter, including the vinyl singles "Grönemeyer kann nicht tanzen" (meaning Grönemeyer can't dance) together with Bela B. Droste rarely gave interviews. In 2002, in an interview with Die Welt he said that he wished to no longer appear as a public person. He published more than 35 literary works, for which he received several literary awards.

== Death ==
After a short, serious illness, he died on 15 May 2019, at the age of 57.
