= Diplom-Verwaltungswirt (FH) =

The Diplom-Verwaltungswirt (FH) (abbreviated Dipl.-Verw. (FH)) degree is a Bachelor's level academic undergraduate degree that provides training in laws as well as public management in Germany. The academic degree is achieved within the framework of a dual study program (studies plus integrated practical blocks in a public authority) at a University of applied sciences (Fachhochschule or FH) for public administration. This study is usually only available to appointed civil servants after a public selection procedure. The study program of 4 years is often compressed into 3 years by concentrated studies with no semester breaks. This degree is a combination of the Bachelor of Public Administration and the Bachelor of Laws with the focus on laws, public management and economics. Because of the Bologna Process this degree has been replaced in some German states by a bachelor's degree, though many still award it as a Diplom-Verwaltungswirt (FH).
