= Thierry Bruehl =

French director and theatre director

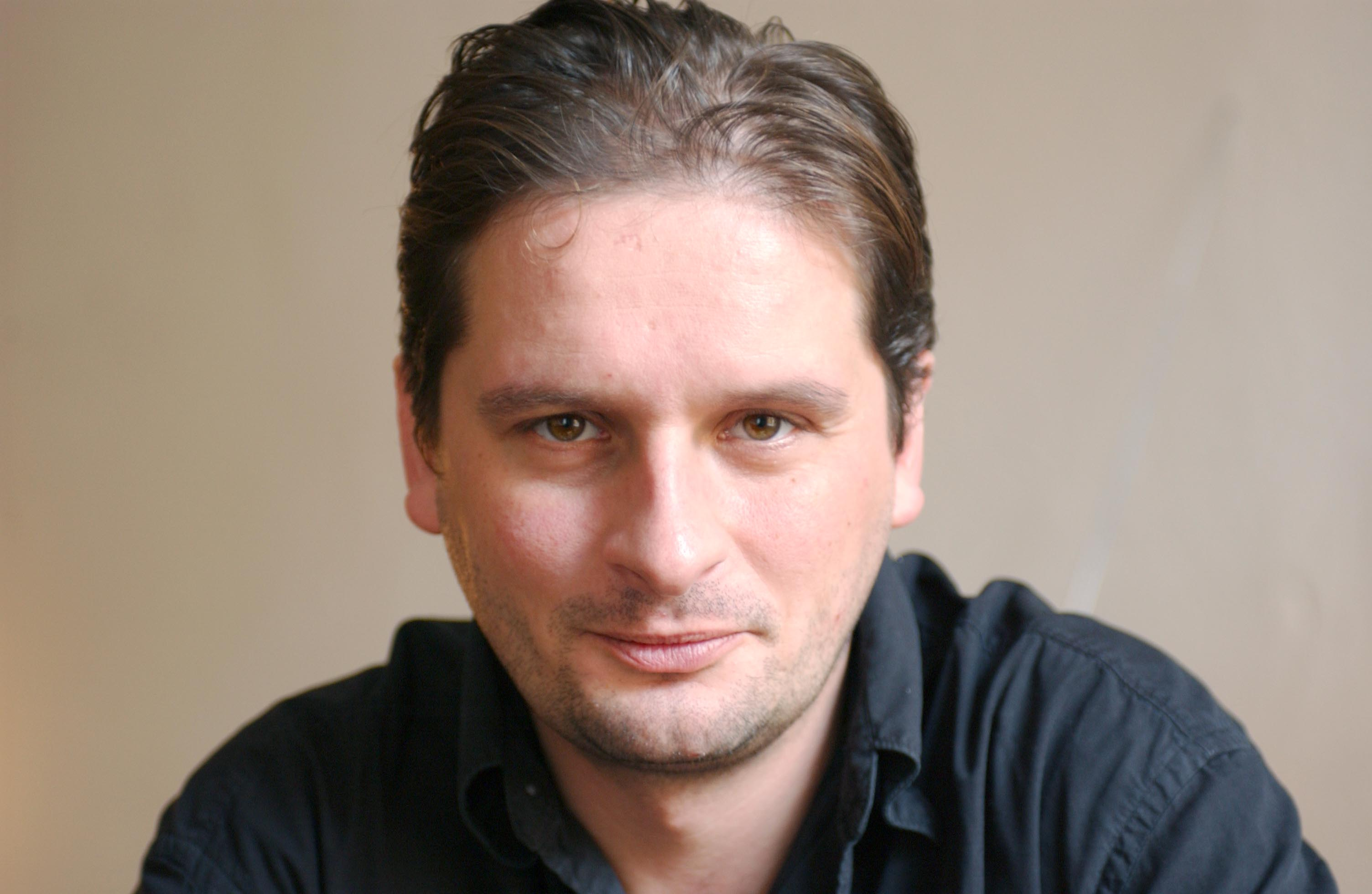
Thierry Bruehl

Thierry Bruehl (born February 19, 1968, in Paris) is a French-German theatre, music theatre and film director. He is the director of the Salzburg Pocket Opera Festival (Taschenopernfestival Salzburg), and has staged numerous productions. The Pocket Opera comes to Salzburg every two years. At the 2019 event he organized a production which included scenes from "Othello", "Richard III", "What You Want" and "Midsummer Night's Dream". For the September 2021 event, Bruehl has arranged a production featuring Zeynep Gedizouglu, Iris ter Schiphorst, Fabio Nieder and Wolfgang Mitterer.

In 2007, Bruehl directed 5 x Deutschland, a short film in the form of five video clips featuring so-called socially disadvantaged young people from Aachen, Bremen, Dortmund, Munich and Magdeburg who answer questions about their background, goals and perspectives.

In 2019, Bruhl was the theatrical director of the Zahir Ensemble production at the Teatro de la Maestranza in Seville, Spain. One critic highlighted his "sober but effective and conceptual staging".
