= Aalto Theatre =

Opera house in Essen, Germany

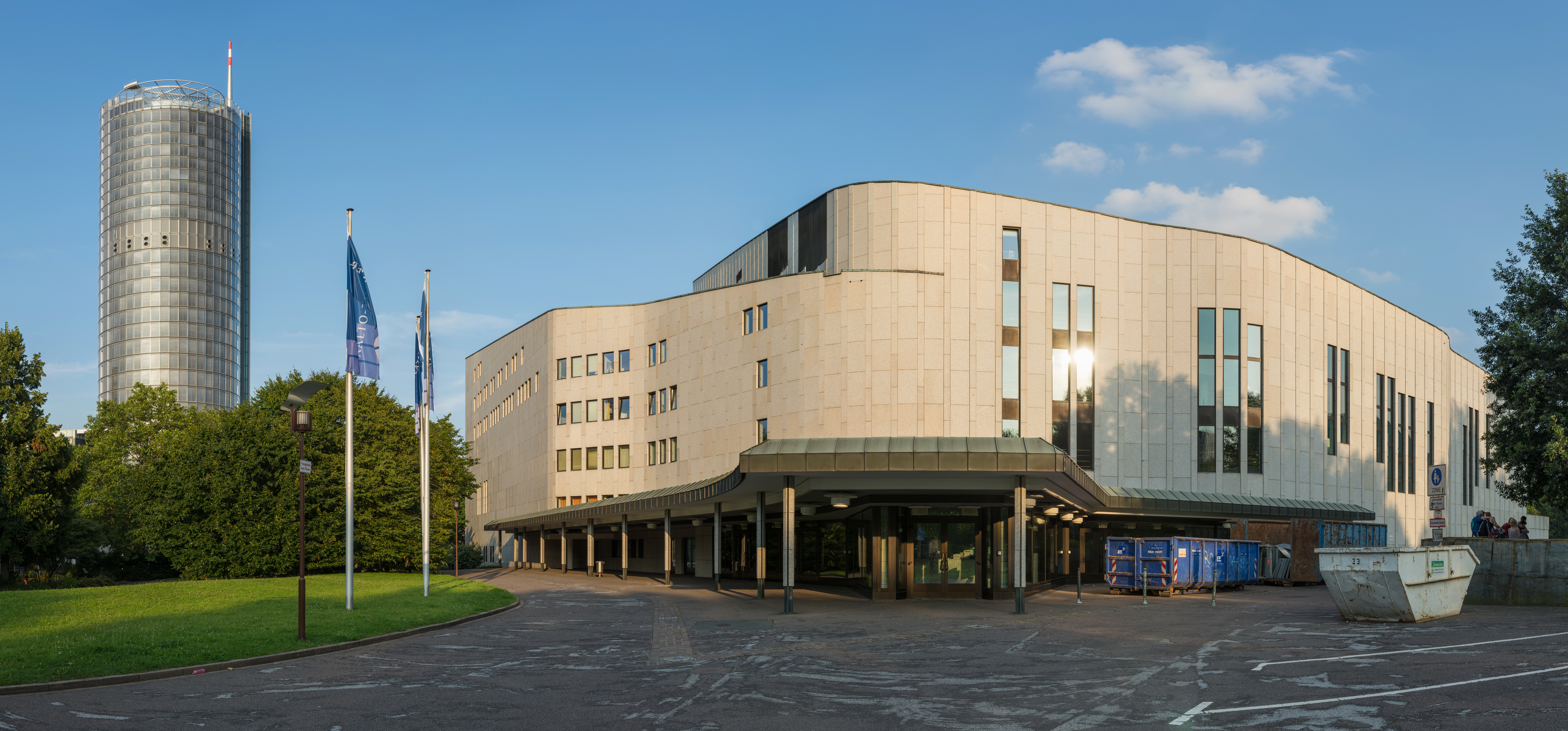
- The theatre in 2013

General information
- Location: Essen, North Rhine-Westphalia, Germany
- Coordinates: 51°26′49″N 7°0′46″E
- Groundbreaking: 1983
- Inaugurated: 25 September 1988

Design and construction
- Architect: Alvar Aalto
- Awards: 2008 Opera House of the Year

Website
- www.theater-essen.de/oper/

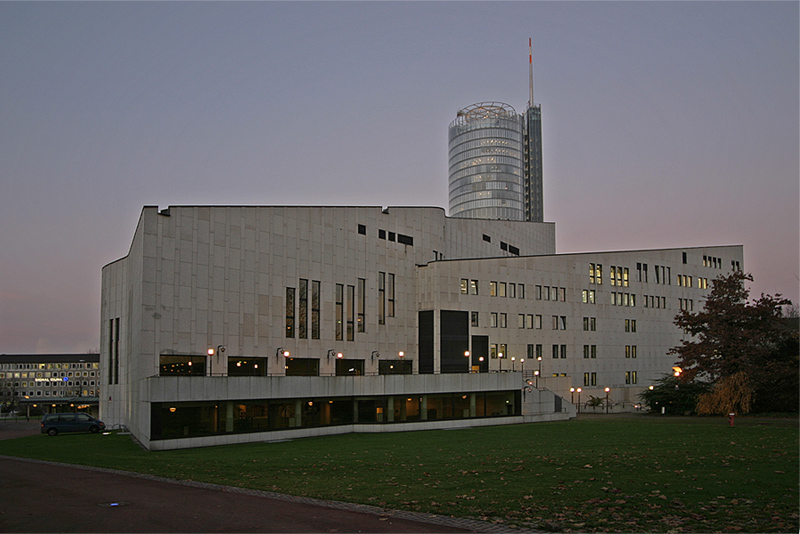
Rear of the theatre

The Aalto Theatre (German: Aalto-Theater) is a performing arts venue in Essen, Germany, and is home to the city's opera company Aalto-Musiktheater and the ballet company Aalto Ballett. The Essener Philharmoniker serve as the venue's orchestra. The theatre opened on 25 September 1988 with Wagner's Die Meistersinger von Nürnberg and is mainly used for opera and ballet, but also for concerts and galas.

The design by the Finnish architect Alvar Aalto was the unanimous winner in a competition in 1959, but the building was begun only in 1983, seven years after Aalto's death. A feature of the auditorium's design is its asymmetrical layout and the indigo blue colour of the seats.

Conductor Wolf-Dieter Hauschild held the positions of both Intendant and Generalmusikdirektor in personal union from 1992 until 1997, followed by Stefan Soltesz from 1997 until 2013. Soltesz led the Essener Philharmoniker to the title Orchestra of the Year in 2003 and 2008 and the Aalto-Musiktheater to that of Opera House of the Year in 2008, following a survey of 50 critics by magazine Opernwelt.

He was succeeded as Intendant by Hein Mulders and as Generalmusikdirektor by Tomáš Netopil.
