= Tomáš Netopil =

Czech conductor (born 1975)

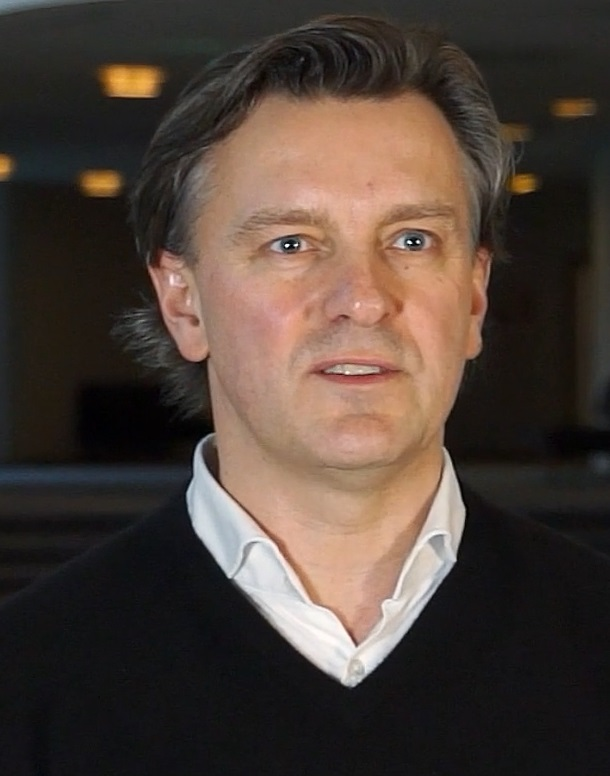
Tomáš Netopil 2023

Tomáš Netopil (born 18 July 1975) is a Czech conductor. He conducted the Oslo Philharmonic Orchestra in 2005 and made his debut with the London Philharmonic Orchestra in May 2006. In 2006, he also conducted at the Salzburg Festival and l'Orchestra del Teatro Regio di Parma.

Netopil studied violin and conducting in his home town Kroměříž in the Czech Republic as well as at the Royal College of Music in Stockholm with Jorma Panula, who educated many prominent conductors. In 2002 he won the first Sir Georg Solti International Conductors' Competition at the Alte Oper in Frankfurt. In May 2004, Netopil made his debut at the Prague Spring International Music Festival, and immediately after that he conducted Dvořák's Stabat Mater at the Salzburg Festival. At the invitation of David Zinman, Netopil worked for the first time with the Cleveland Orchestra at the Aspen Music Festival and School in Colorado as assistant conductor in 2005. Since the season 2009/2010 he became chief conductor of the orchestra of the National Theatre.

He has published several albums with the German independent record label Oehms Classics.
