= Herford =

Herford Hiarwede (Low German)
- Town
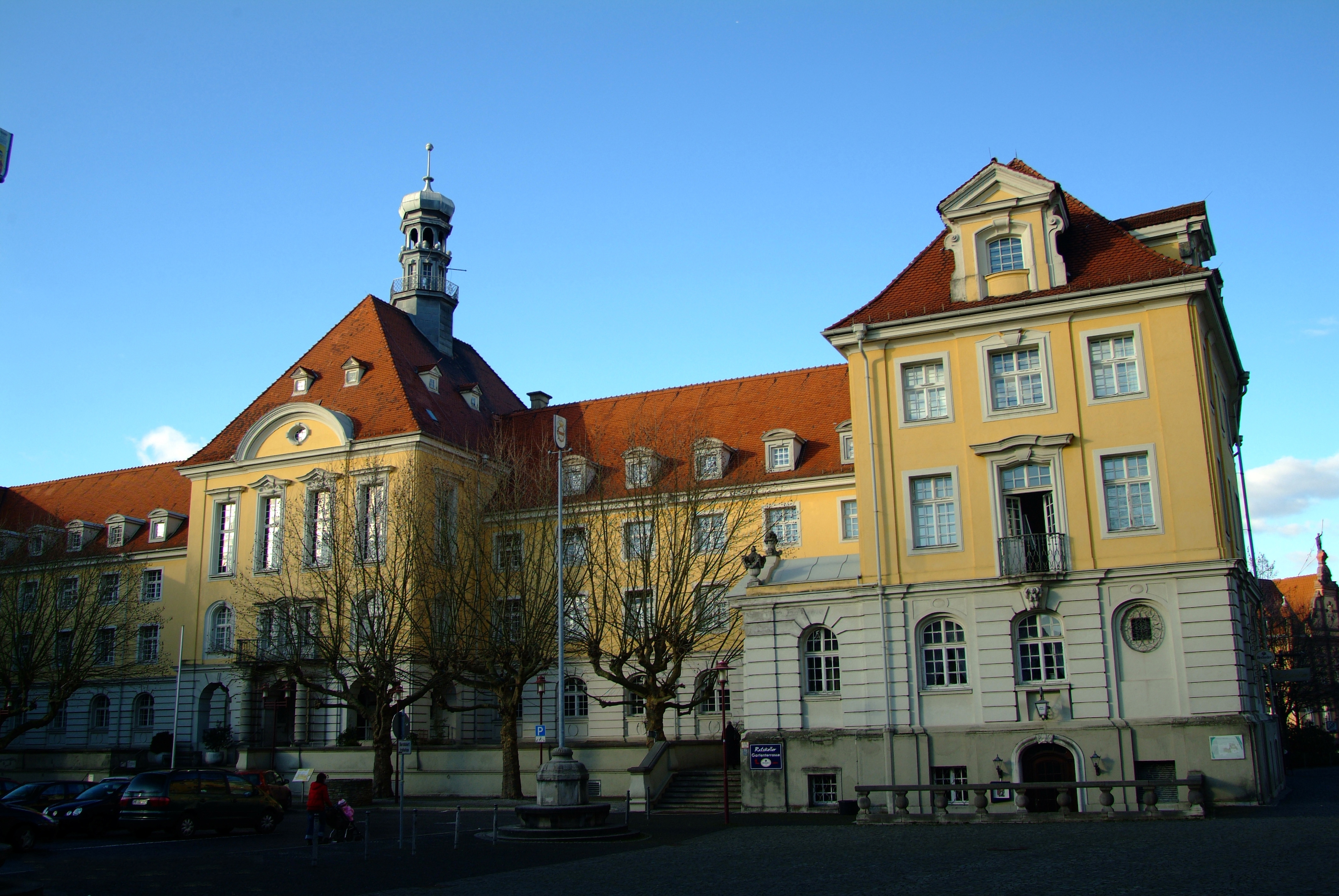
- Town Hall

- Flag Coat of arms

- Location of Herford within Herford district
- Interactive map of Herford
- Location within Germany Location within North Rhine-Westphalia
- Coordinates: 52°8′N 8°41′E
- Country: Germany
- State: North Rhine-Westphalia
- Admin. region: Detmold
- District: Herford
- Founded: 789
- Subdivisions: 12

Government
  - Mayor (2025–30): Anke Theisen (CDU)

Area
  - Total: 79.16 km^{2} (30.56 sq mi)
- Elevation: 56–240 m (184–787 ft)

Population (2025-12-31)
  - Total: 67,074
  - Density: 847.3/km^{2} (2,195/sq mi)
- Time zone: UTC+01:00 (CET)
  - Summer (DST): UTC+02:00 (CEST)
- Postal codes: 32049, 32051, 32052
- Dialling codes: 05221
- Vehicle registration: HF
- Website: www.herford.de

Herford (German: [ˈhɛʁfɔʁt]; Low German: Hiarwede) is a town in North Rhine-Westphalia, Germany, located in the lowlands between the hill chains of the Wiehen Hills and the Teutoburg Forest. It is situated in the cultural region of Ostwestfalen-Lippe (OWL) and the administrative region of Detmold. It is the capital of the district (Landkreis) of Herford.

== Geography ==
=== Geographic location ===
The former Hanseatic town of Herford is situated in the chain of hills south of the Wiehen Hills (Ravensberg Hills). The highest place is the Dornberg (240 m) in the Schwarzenmoor district; the lowest point (56 m) is located in the Werretal in the Falkendiek district. The River Aa joins the river Werre in the centre of the town. The Stuckenberg is located east of the town.

=== Neighbouring towns ===
- West: Enger, Hiddenhausen
- North: Löhne
- North-East: Vlotho
- South-East: Bad Salzuflen (Lippe district)
- South-West: Bielefeld

=== Districts ===
- Altstädter Feldmark
- Neustädter Feldmark
- Radewiger Feldmark
- Diebrock¹
- Eickum¹
- Elverdissen¹
- Falkendiek¹
- Herringhausen¹
- Laar¹
- Schwarzenmoor¹
- Stedefreund¹

== History ==
The town was founded in 789 by Charlemagne in order to guard a ford in the narrow Werre river. A century later, Matilda, daughter of Dietrich of Ringelheim, a count of Saxony, grew up in the abbey of Herford; she was a descendant of the Saxon leader Widukind. In Herford she met Henry the Fowler, who later became king of Germany.

In late medieval times Herford was a member of the Hanseatic League. It was a Free Imperial City, i.e. it was directly subordinated to the emperor. This status was lost after the Peace of Westphalia (1648), when Herford was annexed by Brandenburg-Prussia. It was administered within the Province of Westphalia following the Napoleonic Wars, and made part of the new state North Rhine-Westphalia after World War II.

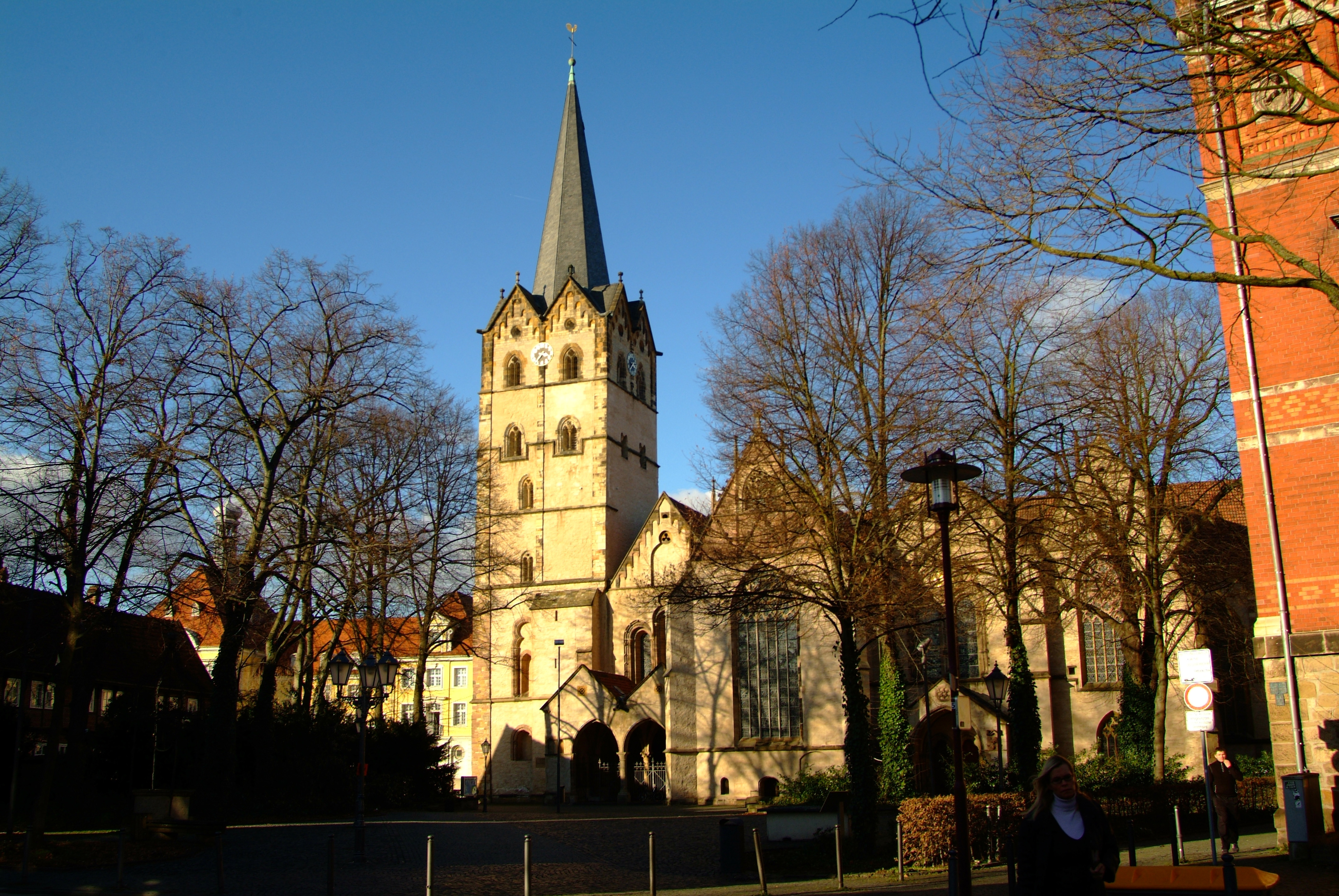
Herford Minster

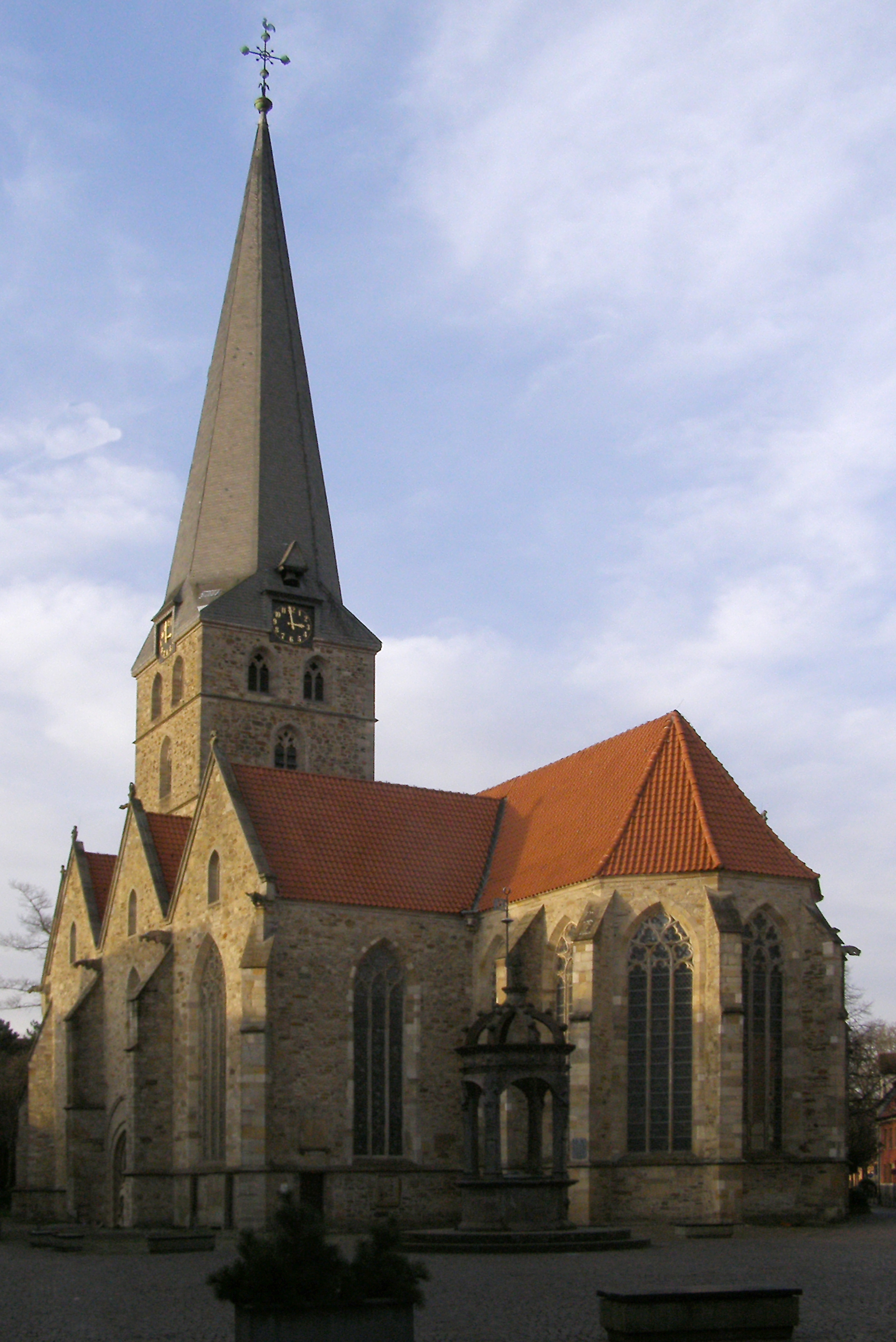
Saint John's Church

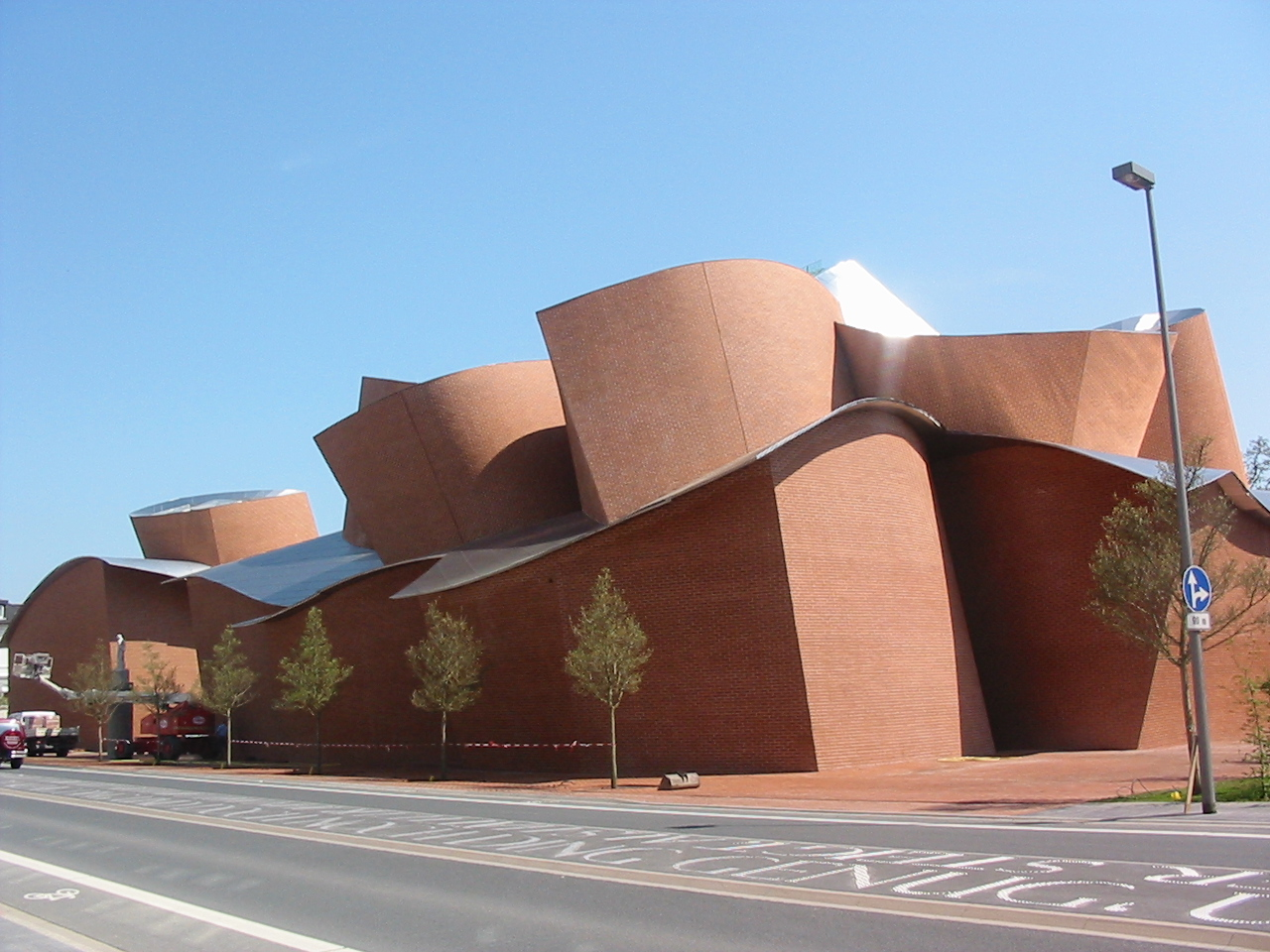
MARTa-Museum

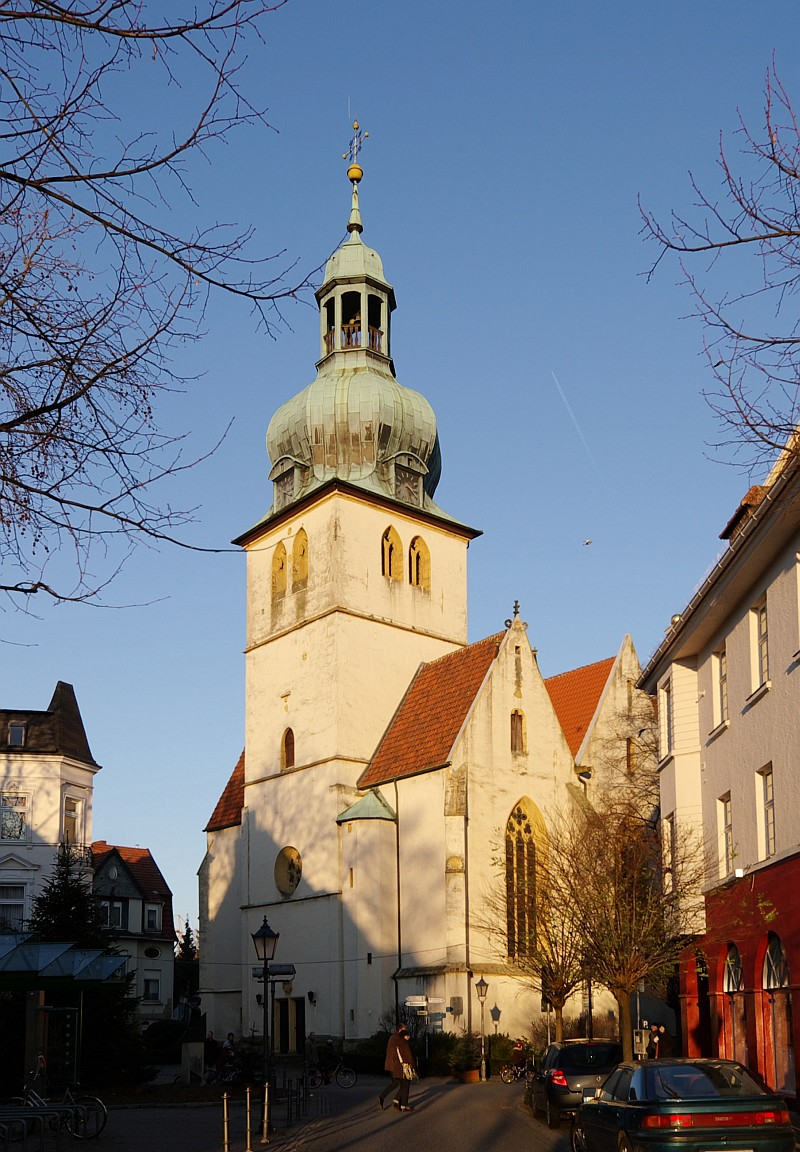
Saint James' Church

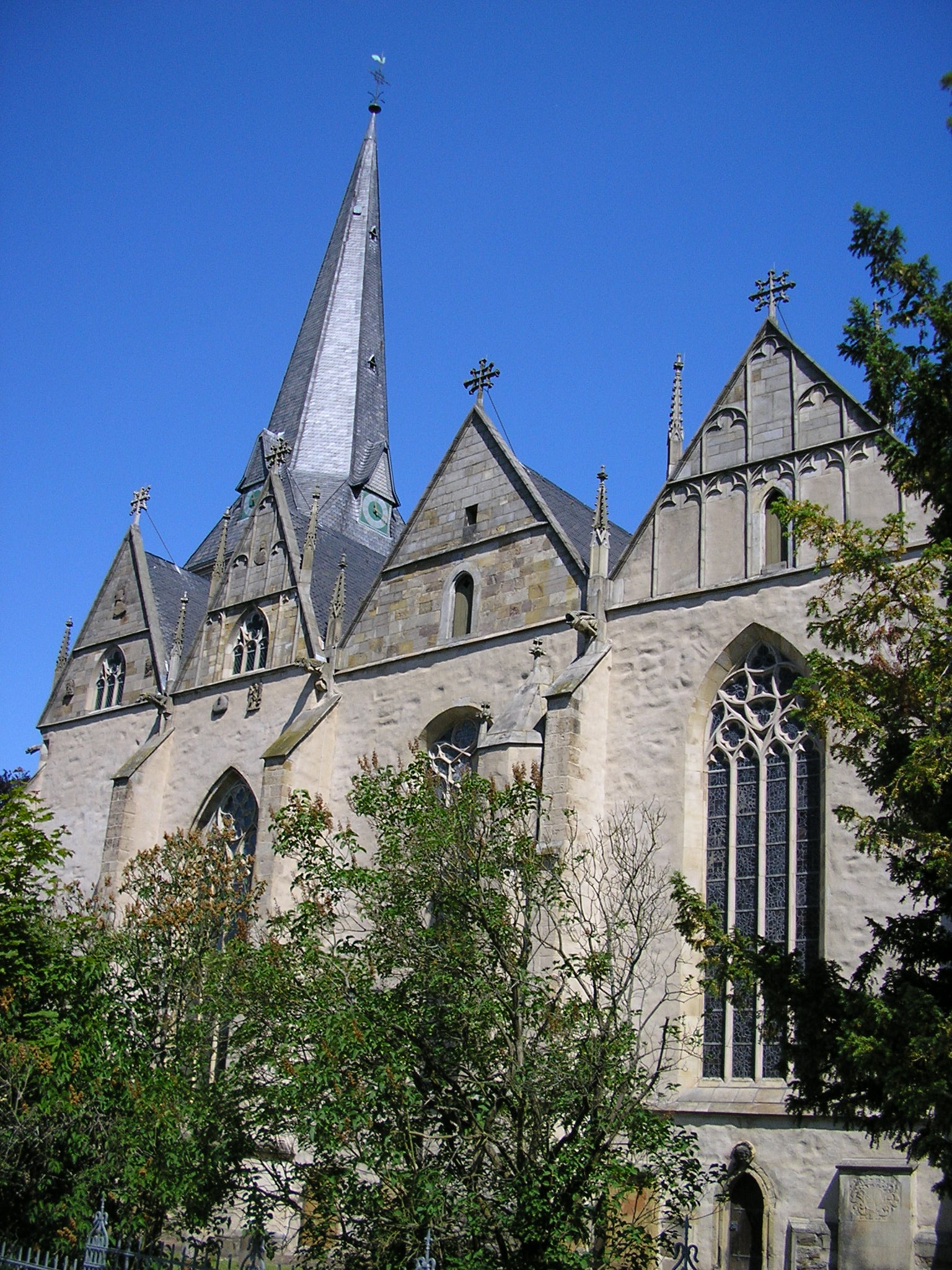
Saint Mary's Church

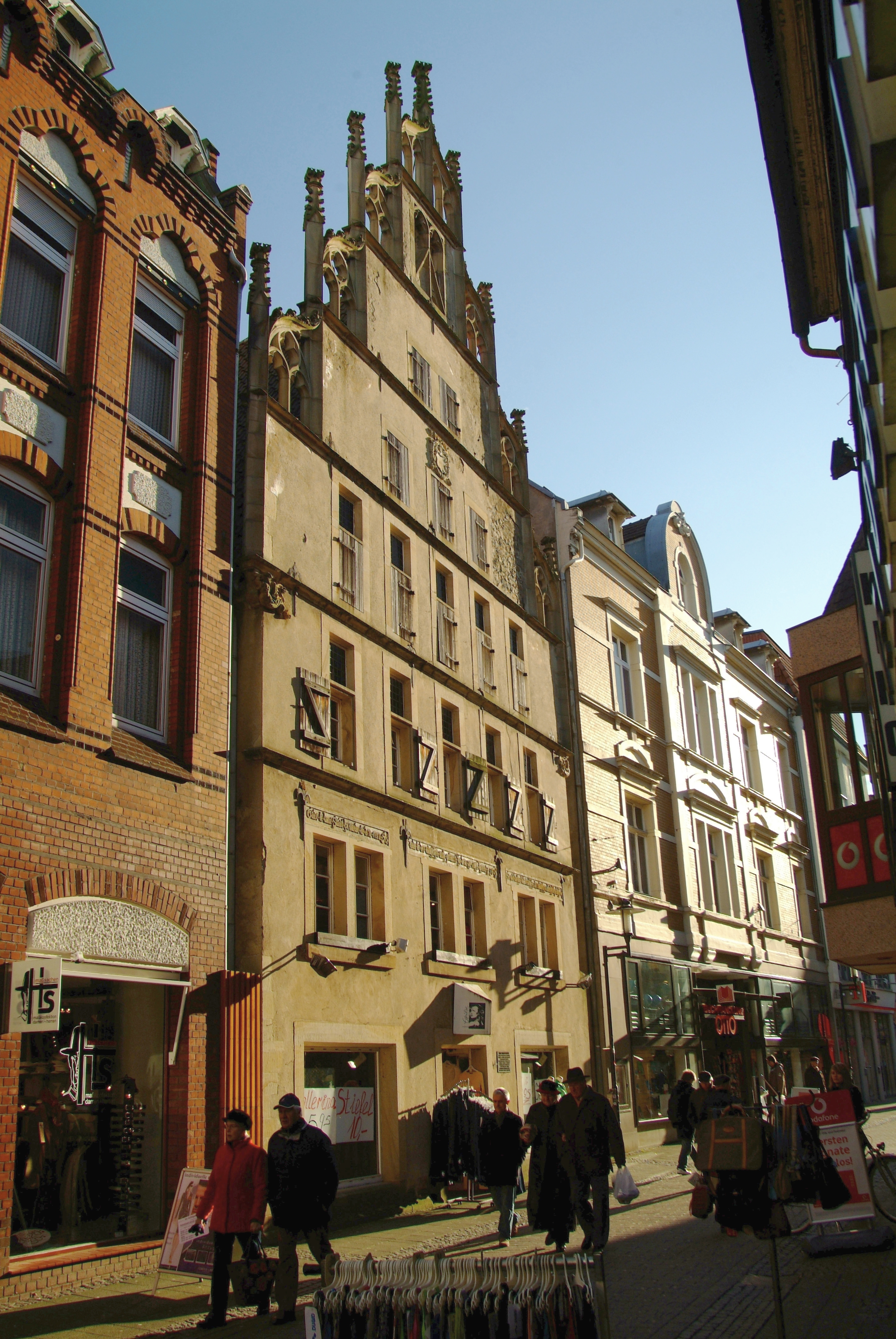
Bürgermeisterhaus

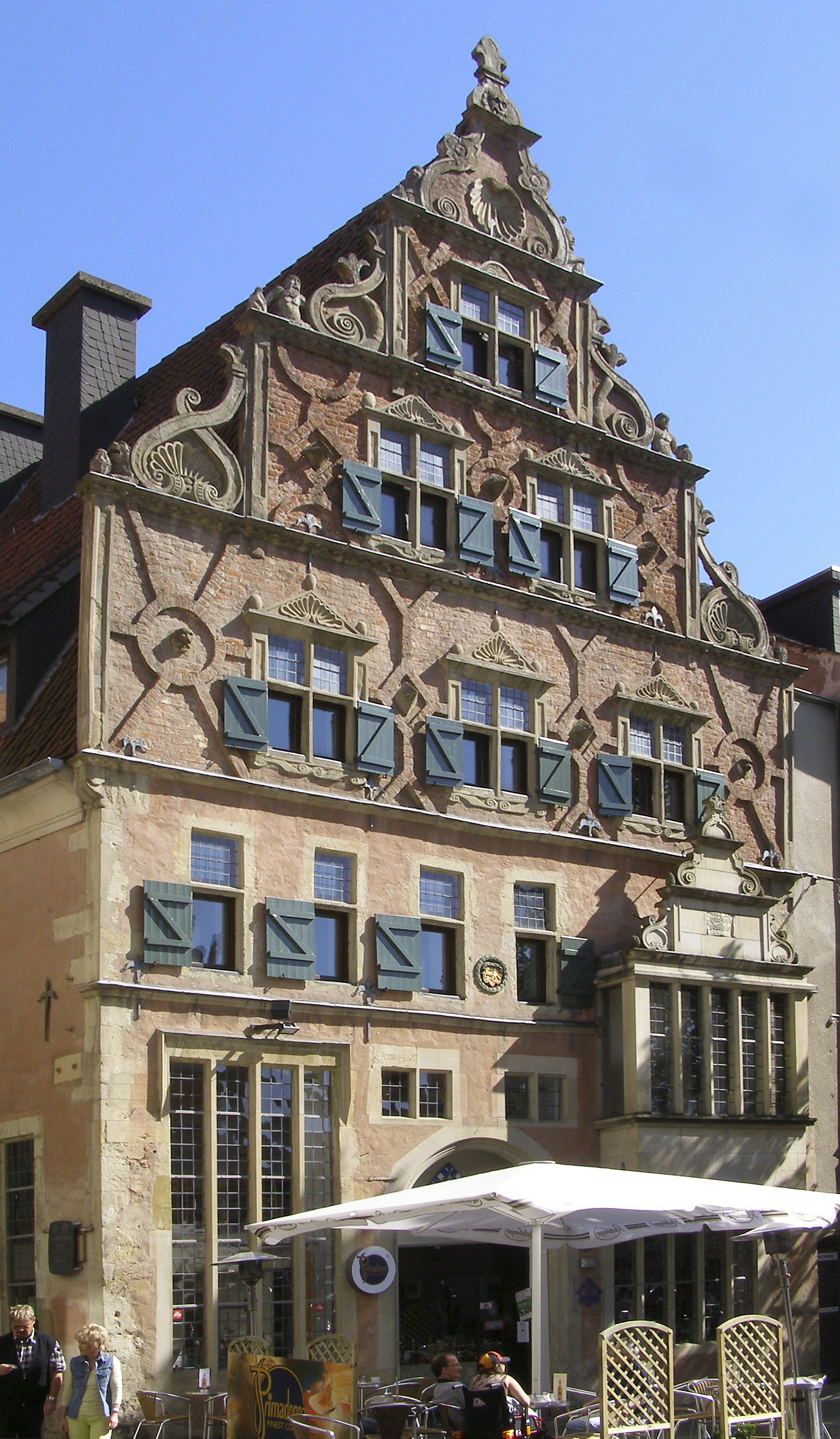
Wulferthaus

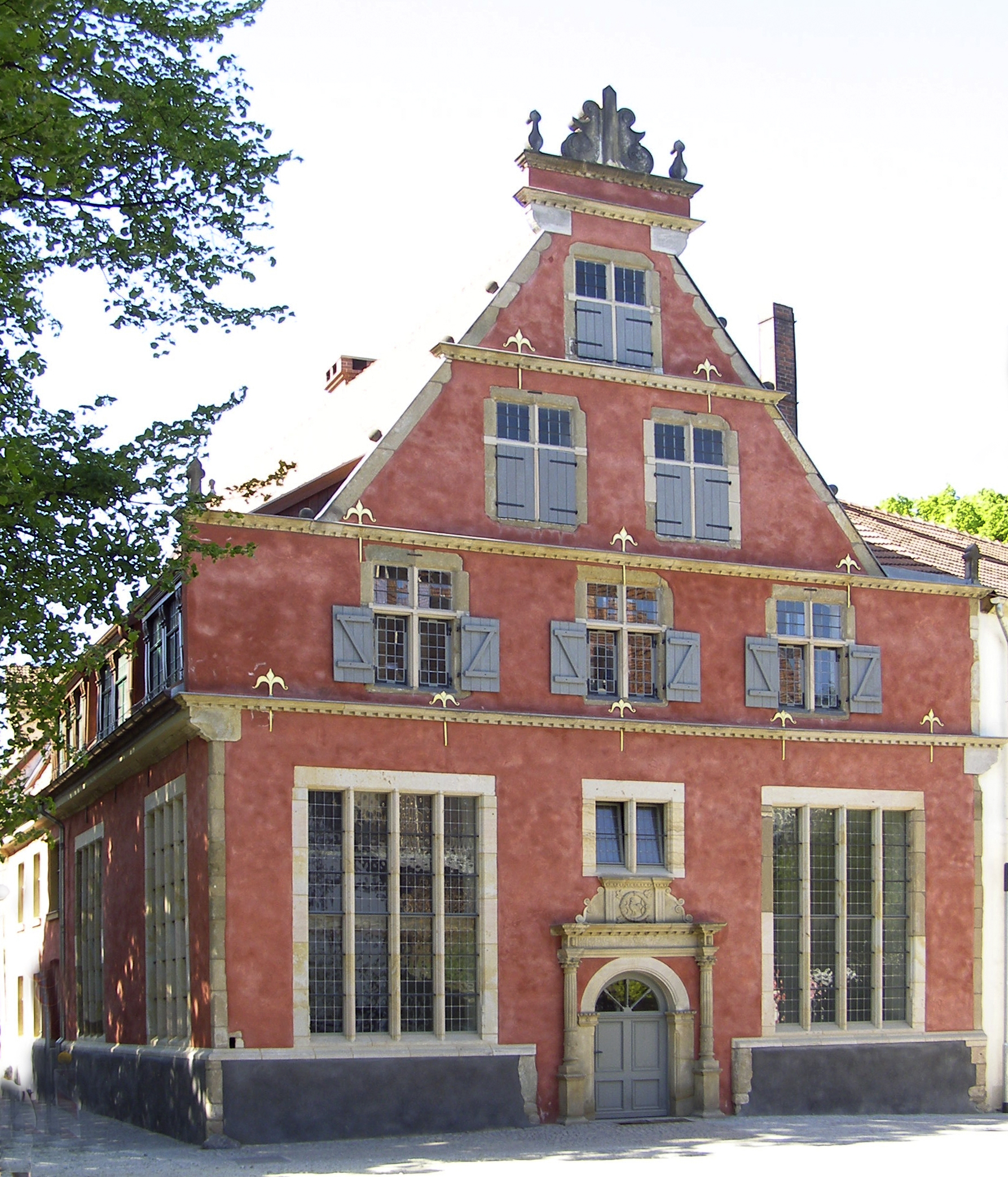
Frühherrenhaus

== Population ==
Historical population

Year	Pop.	±% p.a.
1965	66,373	—
1970	65,422	−0.29%
1975	64,391	−0.32%
1980	62,880	−0.47%
1985	59,639	−1.05%
1990	63,893	+1.39%
1995	65,919	+0.63%

Year	Pop.	±% p.a.
2000	65,083	−0.25%
2005	64,965	−0.04%
2010	64,088	−0.27%
2015	66,521	+0.75%
2020	66,495	−0.01%
2025	67,074	+0.17%

Source: Landesdatabank Nordrhein-Westfalen

== Culture and sights ==
=== Sights ===
- The Herford Minster (Münsterkirche) is a late Romanesque hall church, built about 1220–1250 for the Fürstabtei Herford (Herford monastery). It is one of the earliest hall churches in Germany
- St. James' (Jakobikirche/Radewiger Kirche) is a late Gothic hall church (1330)
- St. John's (St. Johannis/Neustädter Kirche) is a late Gothic hall church (1340)
- St. Mary's (St. Marien auf dem Berge) is also a late Gothic hall church. It was completed about 1325/50 and part of a monastery
- Town hall, built 1913–16 by Paul Kanold in Neo-Baroque forms
- Neustädter Rathaus (former town hall), built 1600, aesthetic pediment 1930 removed, 1988/89 reconstructed
- Remensnider-Haus, Brüderstraße 26, a late Gothic half-timbered building from 1521
- Kantorhaus, Elisabethstraße 2, a half-timbered building, about 1484/1494
- Holland 21, half-timbered building, 1554
- Holland 39, half-timbered building, 1559
- Bürgermeisterhaus, Höckerstraße 4, a late Gothic stone building from 1538 with a stepped gable similar to houses in Münster and Bielefeld
- Frühherrenstraße 11, a Renaissance building, 1591
- Wulfert-Haus, Neuer Markt 2 with a brick-built Renaissance gable, 1560

=== Museums ===
The MARTa Herford, a museum for contemporary art and design, housed in a building designed by Frank Gehry, has been open to the public since May 2005. Its exhibits change regularly.

The Daniel-Pöppelmann-Haus in Herford explores the history of the city, and the Memorial and Meeting Place Cell Block, in the basement of the city hall, documents the persecution and the obliteration of minorities. Plans to construct a museum of city history next to the city hall and the Minster church have been postponed.

=== Music and theatre ===
Herford is the seat of the Nordwestdeutsche Philharmonie (Northwest German Philharmonic) which performs regularly in the Stadtpark Schützenhof as well as many neighbouring cities in North Rhine-Westphalia. Eugene Tzigane is the principal conductor designate (2010–present).

The Stadttheater (Municipal theatre) provides seats for 706 viewers and it is served by visiting theatre companies.

=== Events at regular intervals ===
- Easter Fair around Easter (Oster-Kirmes)
- Jazz Festival May – Performances of different jazz artists in a couple of bars
- Organ Summer
- Visions Fair June
- Summer Stage Summer (Sommerbühne) – Concerts at the square between city hall and market hall
- Hoekerfest August – Municipal festival with plenty of events in the city centre
- City Fair October – In the city centre
- Herbstzeitlos (Autumnally timeless) Autumn – Exhibition at the former depot site
- Wine Festival Autumn – At Gänsemarkt
- Christmas Lights December – Municipal Christmas fair (Weihnachtsmarkt)

== Economy ==
- Vivani organic chocolate;
- Herforder Pils beer.

== Military ==
Herford was the location of the headquarters of the 1st (United Kingdom) Armoured Division at Westfalen Garrison, part of British Forces Germany, until the division moved to the United Kingdom in 2015.

The British Forces Broadcasting Service (BFBS) studio for Germany was located in Wentworth Barracks until 2009 when it moved to Hohne.

7th Signal Regiment, based at Maresfield Barracks on Stadtholz Strasse, received the honour of the Freedom of Herford in 1973 Becoming the first British military unit to receive the freedom of a German city.

== Twin towns – sister cities ==
Herford is twinned with:

- Hinckley, England, United Kingdom (1972)
- Fredericia, Denmark (1987)
- Quincy, United States (1991)

=== Friendly cities ===
Herford also has friendly relations with:

- Vodice, Croatia (1974)
- Gorzów Wielkopolski, Poland (1995)
- Manavgat, Turkey (2008)
- Xinbei (Jiangsu), China (2015)

== Notable people ==
- Heinrich von Herford (c. 1300–1370)
- Gerhard Friedrich Müller (1705–1783), explorer of Siberia
- Karl Ludwig Costenoble (1769–1837), actor and theatre director
- Frederick August Otto Schwarz (1836–1911), founder of FAO Schwarz toystore
- Friedrich Adolf Richter (1847–1910), founder of Richter (toy company)
- Carl Severing (1875–1952), politician (SPD)
- Otto Weddigen (1882–1915), submarine-commander in World War I
- Carl Menckhoff (1883–1949), WWI Fighter Ace
- Hermann Höpker-Aschoff (1883–1954), politician (DDP, FDP)
- Karl Steinhoff (1892–1981), Minister-president (Ministerpräsident) of the German state (Land) of Brandenburg
- Reinhard Maack (1892–1969), explorer, geologist and geographer
- Erich Gutenberg (1897–1984), economist
- Heinz Röttger (1909–1977), composer
- Rolf Weinberg (1919–2011), member of French World War II resistance
- Hans Kornberg (1928–2019), biochemist
- Wilhelm Leber (born 1947), mathematician
- Bernd Sponheuer (born 1948), musicologist
- Marian Gold (born 1954), singer-songwriter
- Karl-Heinz Wiesemann (born 1960), 96th Bishop of Speyer
- Wiglaf Droste (1961–2019), poet and satirical writer
- Jörg Rüpke (born 1962), academic, scholar of comparative religion and classical philology
- Christian Dahm (born 1963), politician (SPD)
- Thomas Helmer (born 1965), footballer
- Philipp Heithölter (born 1982), footballer
- Diego Demme (born 1991), footballer
- Edon Zhegrova (born 1999), footballer
- Carlotta Wamser (born 2003), footballer
