= Thüringer Symphoniker Saalfeld-Rudolstadt =

The Thüringer Symphoniker Saalfeld-Rudolstadt is a symphony orchestra based in Rudolstadt, Thuringia, Germany.

== History ==
During the reign of Count Ludwig Günther I of Schwarzburg-Rudolstadt, the orchestra appears as the "Rudolstädter Hofkapelle" in historic documents of 1635. Among the early music directors were Philipp Heinrich Erlebach and Traugott Maximilian Eberwein. Eberwein performed several new works by Beethoven in Rudolstadt during the composer’s lifetime, including the Symphony No. 9 in 1827.

The Hofkapelle accompanied opera performances in the Rudolstadt Theatre from 1793 onwards. The theatre was used by Goethe’s ensemble of the Weimar Court Theatre from 1794 to 1803. Among the operas performed were Weber's Der Freischütz in 1822 and Auber's La muette de Portici in 1828, shortly after their premieres. Richard Wagner gave guest performances in Rudolstadt for six weeks in 1834, when he was the young music director of the Bethmann opera company. The Rudolstadt Theatre staged Tannhäuser in 1855. Instrumental virtuosos who appeared with the orchestra included Niccolò Paganini in 1829 and Franz Liszt in 1844.

After the foundation of the Free State of Thuringia in 1919, the theatre was given the status of a state theatre and the orchestra was renamed "Thüringer Landeskapelle Rudolstadt". On 24 and 25 September 1921, the music director Ernst Wollong, together with the directors of the "Deutsche Musikabende" and the "Städtische Singakademie", organised the first "Historisches Musikfest" in Rudolstadt at the Heidecksburg Palace. Otto Hartung and Hans Swarowsky were also important conductors in the period between the two world wars. Eugen d'Albert conducted the orchestra in 1928 for the performance of his opera Die toten Augen.

The Landeskapelle Rudolstadt was unified with the state symphony orchestra of the neighbouring town of Saalfeld after the German reunification, under the new name "Thüringer Symphoniker Saalfeld-Rudolstadt". Theatre director Peter P. Pachl attempted to revive the Rudolstadt festival tradition. A cooperation with the Landeskapelle Eisenach began in 1995, but ended in 2003.

Since 1997, Oliver Weder has been the music director. The orchestra offers symphony and palais concerts as well as numerous special, youth and children's concerts in both cities. It also accompanies music theatre performances at the Rudolstadt Theatre. The Thüringer Symphoniker cooperate with the music theatre ensemble of the Theater Nordhausen for the music theatre programme.

The orchestra has released CD recordings of instrumental works from the historical Rudolstadt music collection.

Since 2008 the orchestra has also participated in the annual Dance and Folk Festival Rudolstadt, collaborating with artists including Arlo Guthrie and Juan José Mosalini.

== Directors and conductors ==
- Philipp Heinrich Erlebach (1681–1714)
- Conrad Heinrich Lyra (1714–1738)
- Johann Graf (1738–1745)
- Christoph Förster (1745)
- Christian Ernst Graf (1745–1747)
- Georg Gebel (1747–1753)
- Christian Gotthelf Scheinpflug (1754–1770)
- Johann Wilhelm Gehring (1771–1787)
- Johann August Bodinus (1787–1792)
- Heinrich Christoph Koch (1792–1793)
- Johann Christian Eberwein (1794–1817)
- Traugott Maximilian Eberwein (1817–1831)
- Friedrich Müller (1835–1854)
- Ludwig Eberwein (1854–1855)
- Hermann Hesselbarth (1855–1893)
- Rudolph Herfurth (1893–1911)
- Otto Hartung (1911–1920)
- Ernst Wollong (1921–1924)
- Erich Böhlke (1924–1926)
- Helmut Kellermann (1926–1927)
- Joseph Trauneck (1928–1932)
- Hans Swarowsky (1933–1934)
- Max Stumböck (1934–1935)
- Karl Vollmer (1936–1941)
- Helmut Diedrich (1945–1948)
- Wilhelm Biesold (1948–1949)
- Max Giernoth (1949–1951)
- Heinz Köppen (1951–1959)
- Carl Ferrand (1959–1961)
- Rolf Stadler (1961–1970)
- Klaus-Dieter Demmler (1970–1977)
- Konrad Bach (1977–1997)
- Oliver Weder (since 1997)

== Guest conductors and collaborators ==
Throughout its history, the orchestra has worked with a variety of guest conductors, composers and artistic collaborators in concert projects, opera productions and festival appearances. Conductors and musical figures associated with guest appearances or special projects include Richard Wagner, who appeared in Rudolstadt in 1834 while serving as music director of the Bethmann opera company, Eugen d'Albert, who conducted his opera Die toten Augen in 1928, Hans Swarowsky, Peter P. Pachl, and Nayden Todorov. In festival and crossover projects, the orchestra has also collaborated with artists and musical directors such as Sven Helbig, Juan José Mosalini and Arlo Guthrie.

== Sources ==
- Peter Larsen, Ute Omonsky, Markus Wakdura: Musik am Rudolstädter Hof: Die Entwicklung der Hofkapelle vom 17. Jahrhundert bis zum Beginn des 20. Jahrhunderts, Rudolstadt 1997.
- Eckart Kröplin, Peter P. Pachl, eds.: 200 Jahre Theater Rudolstadt, Rudolstadt 1994.
- Ute Omonsky: "Rudolstadt", in Musik in Geschichte und Gegenwart online, Kassel, 2016.
- Joachim Lange: Eine Talkshow im Sonnenstaat – Cherubinis Oper „Idalide oder Die Jungfrau der Sonne“ in Saalfeld. In: Neue Musikzeitung, 19 February 2019.
