= Psalm 68 =

Biblical psalm

- "Let God arise, let his enemies be scattered"
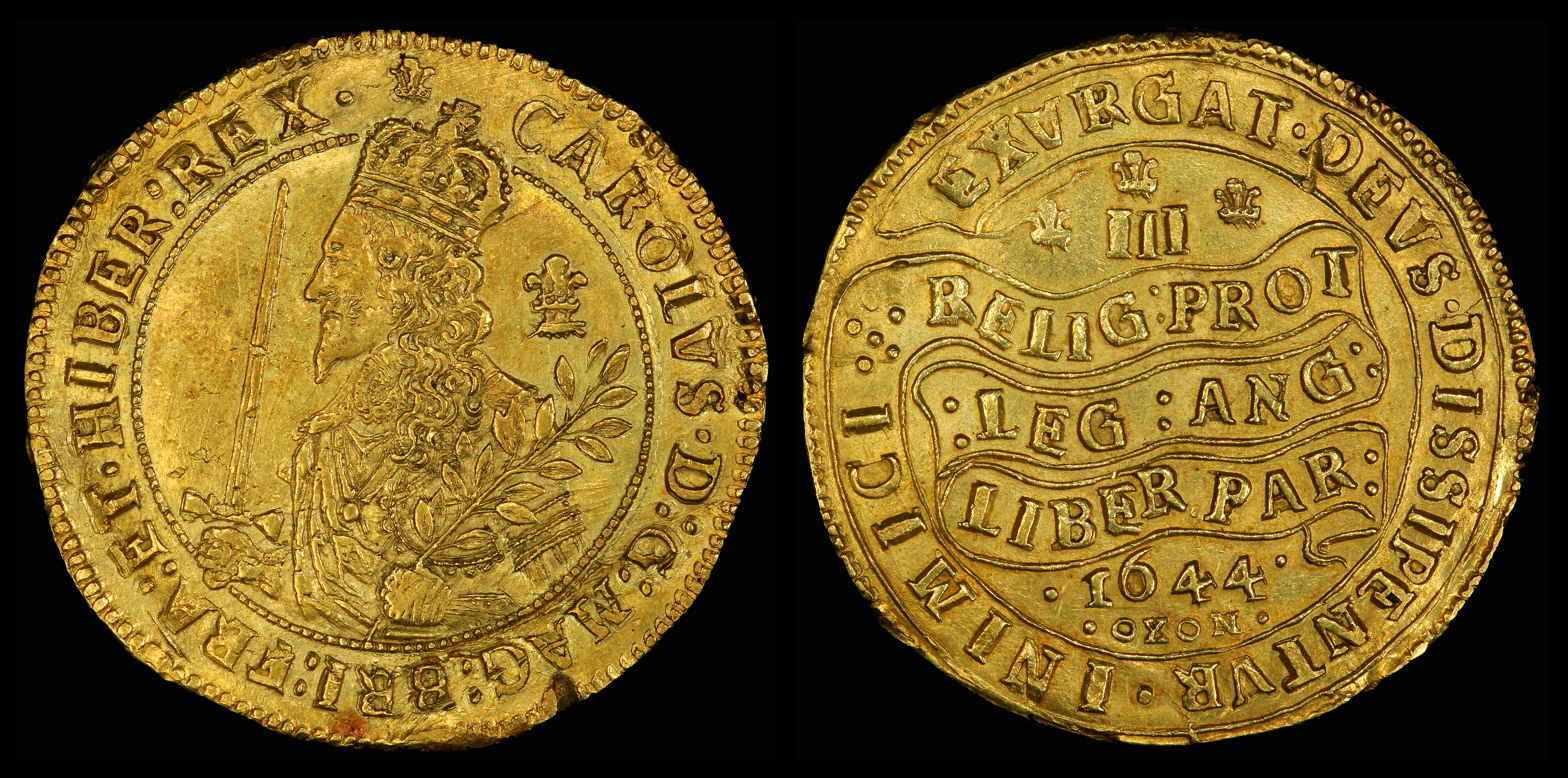
- The Triple Unite coin of Charles I (1644) bears the psalm's incipit EXURGAT DEUS DISSIPENTUR INIMICI
- Other name: Psalm 67; "Exsurgat Deus"
- Language: Hebrew (original)

Psalm 68
- ← Psalm 67 Psalm 69 →
- Book: Book of Psalms
- Hebrew Bible part: Ketuvim
- Order in the Hebrew part: 1
- Category: Sifrei Emet
- Christian Bible part: Old Testament
- Order in the Christian part: 19

Psalm 68 (or Psalm 67 in Septuagint and Vulgate numbering) is "the most difficult and obscure of all the psalms." In the English of the King James Version it begins "Let God arise, let his enemies be scattered". In the Latin Vulgate version it begins "Exsurgat Deus et dissipentur inimici eius". It has 35 verses (36 according to Hebrew numbering). Methodist writer Arno C. Gaebelein calls it "The Great Redemption Accomplished" and describes it as "one of the greatest Psalms".

Psalm 68 is used in both Jewish and Christian liturgies, and is central to Rastafari and the Ethiopian movement. It has often been set to music, such as Marc-Antoine Charpentier's Exurgat Deus (H.215) in Latin around 1690, for soloists, chorus, two treble instruments and continuo. Handel used verses 11 and 18 in his 1742 oratorio Messiah (HWV 56).

== Difficulty ==
Writers like Pettinato in Ebla and Dahood in Psalms II say the psalm is one of the most difficult in the canon to translate. Pettinato ascribes this to its large number of hapax legomena

=== Name of God ===
According to Gaebelein, the name of God is found in this psalm in seven different forms: Jehovah (or YHWH), Adonai, El, Shaddai, Jah (or Yah), Jehovah-Adonai and Jah-Elohim.

== Uses ==
=== New Testament ===
Verse 18 of Psalm 68 is referenced in the New Testament in Ephesians 4:8:

διὸ λέγει Ἀναβὰς εἰς ὕψος ᾐχμαλώτευσεν αἰχμαλωσίαν καὶ ἔδωκεν δόματα τοῖς ἀνθρώποις
Wherefore he saith, When he ascended up on high, he led captivity captive, and gave gifts unto men.

The passage in the psalm makes reference to the Ark of the Covenant ascending to Mount Zion, and Paul is here drawing a comparison to the Ascension of Jesus.

=== In Judaism ===
According to the "Complete ArtScroll Siddur" as edited by Nosson Scherman in 1984, isolated verses from the psalm are part of contemporary Jewish liturgy:

- Verses 5-6 are part of the prayers recited following Motzei Shabbat Maariv (p. 609),
- Verse 20 is part of Uva Letzion (p. 157),
- Verses 35-36 are the fourth and fifth verses of V'hu Rachum in Pesukei Dezimra (p. 62).

According to "The ArtScroll Tehillim" by Hillel Danziger (1989, p. 329), in some traditions, the entire psalm is recited on Shavuot.

=== Catholic liturgy ===
In the monastic tradition dating from the Early Middle Ages, this psalm was traditionally recited at the Matins office on Wednesday, according to the distribution of the rule of St. Benedict fixed at 530.

In the current Liturgy of the Hours, Psalm 68 is recited or sung at the Reading Office on Tuesday of the third week in the four weekly cycle. It is also read on the 22nd Sunday of Ordinary Time in year C in the triennial cycle of the Sunday masses.

=== Eastern Orthodox tradition ===
The first two verses of the psalm's Church Slavonic version form the beginning of the "Prayer of the Cross" or Молитва Кресту in the Russian tradition part of the daily evening prayers:

Да воскре́снетъ Богъ, и расточа́тся врази́ Его́, и да бѣжа́тъ отъ лица́ Его́ ненави́дящіи Его́. Я́ко исчеза́етъ дымъ, да исче́знутъ; я́ко та́етъ воскъ отъ лица́ огня́, та́ко да поги́бнутъ бѣси отъ лица́ лю́бящихъ Бо́га и зна́менующихся кре́стнымъ зна́меніемъ
Let God arise, let his enemies be scattered: let them also that hate him flee before him. As smoke is driven away, so let them be driven away: as wax melteth before the fire, so let the wicked perish at the face of those who love God and who are signified by the sign of the cross.

But, the more important use of this psalm in Eastern Orthodox tradition is in Easter Liturgy. Namely, all services on the Easter day and during the first week after Easter begin with chanting of this psalm, i.e. an archpriest or a priest pronounces it, and all Church answers. Also, during saints' feasts, very often is used the last verse (Дивенъ Богъ въ свѧтыхъ своихъ...).

=== Book of Common Prayer ===
In the Church of England's Book of Common Prayer, this is the sole psalm appointed to be read on the morning of the 13th day of the month, and is one of the psalms proper for Mattins on Whitsunday.

=== Rastafari ===
In Rastafari, the name for God (JAH) comes from Psalm 68:4 in the King James Bible. Psalm 68:31 forms the basis of early Rastafari messianism, which in turn arose from the Ethiopian movement: "Princes shall come out of Egypt; Ethiopia shall soon stretch out her hands unto God". Early Rastafari leader Leonard Howell saw this as a prophecy that would be fulfilled when Haile Selassie I was crowned emperor of Ethiopia.

== Musical settings ==
Heinrich Schütz set Psalm 68 in a metred version in German, "Es steh Gott auf, daß seine Feind", SWV 165, as part of the Becker Psalter, first published in 1628.

Marc-Antoine Charpentier composed Exurgat Deus (H.215) around 1690, set for soloists, chorus, 2 treble instruments and continuo.

Philipp Heinrich Erlebach composed Gelobet sei der Herr täglich around 1710, a church cantata for the First Sunday after Trinity beginning with Psalm 68:20.

Handel's 1742 oratorio Messiah (HWV 56) cites verses 11 and 18 according to the King James Version.

British composer Havergal Brian incorporated the psalm in his Symphony No. 4 "Das Siegeslied", using the original Lutheran version in German, and translated into English.

== Secular allusions ==
The second part of verse 31, "Ethiopia shall soon stretch her hands unto God" (Ge'ez: ኢትዮጵያ ታበድ አደዊሃ ሃበ አግዚአብሐር, Itiyopia tabetsih edewiha habe Igziabiher) was used in the coat of arms of Emperor Haile Selassie, and was also formerly used as the national motto of Ethiopia. (The original Hebrew refers to Cush (כוש).)

John Buchan's collection of short stories The Runagates Club (1928) derives its title from verse 6, which in the Book of Common Prayer reads "but letteth the runagates continue in scarceness", where the King James Version has "but the rebellious dwell in a dry land"; runagate is an obsolete spelling of renegade.

== Text ==
The following table shows the Hebrew text of the Psalm with vowels, alongside the Koine Greek text in the Septuagint and the English translation from the King James Version. Note that the meaning can slightly differ between these versions, as the Septuagint and the Masoretic Text come from different textual traditions. (Note: A 1917 translation directly from Hebrew to English by the Jewish Publication Society can be found here or here, and an 1844 translation directly from the Septuagint by L. C. L. Brenton can be found here. Both translations are in the public domain.) In the Septuagint, this psalm is numbered Psalm 67.

| # | Hebrew | English | Greek |
|---|---|---|---|
| (Note: In the Jewish verse numbering, the ascription of this psalm is verse 1, and the rest of the psalm begins from verse 2. However, the Christian verse numbering does not count the ascription.) | לַמְנַצֵּ֥חַ לְדָוִ֗ד מִזְמ֥וֹר שִֽׁיר׃ | (To the chief Musician, A Psalm or Song of David.) | Εἰς τὸ τέλος· ᾠδῆς ψαλμὸς τῷ Δαυΐδ. - |
| 1 | יָק֣וּם אֱ֭לֹהִים יָפ֣וּצוּ אוֹיְבָ֑יו וְיָנ֥וּסוּ מְ֝שַׂנְאָ֗יו מִפָּנָֽיו׃ | Let God arise, let his enemies be scattered: let them also that hate him flee before him. | ΑΝΑΣΤΗΤΩ ὁ Θεός, καὶ διασκορπισθήτωσαν οἱ ἐχθροὶ αὐτοῦ, καὶ φυγέτωσαν ἀπὸ προσώπου αὐτοῦ οἱ μισοῦντες αὐτόν. |
| 2 | כְּהִנְדֹּ֥ף עָשָׁ֗ן תִּ֫נְדֹּ֥ף כְּהִמֵּ֣ס דּ֭וֹנַג מִפְּנֵי־אֵ֑שׁ יֹאבְד֥וּ רְ֝שָׁעִ֗ים מִפְּנֵ֥י אֱלֹהִֽים׃ | As smoke is driven away, so drive them away: as wax melteth before the fire, so let the wicked perish at the presence of God. | ὡς ἐκλείπει καπνός, ἐκλιπέτωσαν· ὡς τήκεται κηρὸς ἀπὸ προσώπου πυρός, οὕτως ἀπολοῦνται οἱ ἁμαρτωλοὶ ἀπὸ προσώπου τοῦ Θεοῦ. |
| 3 | וְֽצַדִּיקִ֗ים יִשְׂמְח֣וּ יַ֭עַלְצוּ לִפְנֵ֥י אֱלֹהִ֗ים וְיָשִׂ֥ישׂוּ בְשִׂמְחָֽה׃ | But let the righteous be glad; let them rejoice before God: yea, let them exceedingly rejoice. | καὶ οἱ δίκαιοι εὐφρανθήτωσαν, ἀγαλλιάσθωσαν ἐνώπιον τοῦ Θεοῦ, τερφθήτωσαν ἐν εὐφροσύνῃ. |
| 4 | שִׁ֤ירוּ ׀ לֵאלֹהִים֮ זַמְּר֢וּ שְׁ֫מ֥וֹ סֹ֡לּוּ לָרֹכֵ֣ב בָּ֭עֲרָבוֹת בְּיָ֥הּ שְׁמ֗וֹ וְעִלְז֥וּ לְפָנָֽיו׃ | Sing unto God, sing praises to his name: extol him that rideth upon the heavens by his name JAH, and rejoice before him. | ᾄσατε τῷ Θεῷ, ψάλατε τῷ ὀνόματι αὐτοῦ· ὁδοποιήσατε τῷ ἐπιβεβηκότι ἐπὶ δυσμῶν, Κύριος ὄνομα αὐτῷ, καὶ ἀγαλλιᾶσθε ἐνώπιον αὐτοῦ. |
| 5 | אֲבִ֣י יְ֭תוֹמִים וְדַיַּ֣ן אַלְמָנ֑וֹת אֱ֝לֹהִ֗ים בִּמְע֥וֹן קׇדְשֽׁוֹ׃ | A father of the fatherless, and a judge of the widows, is God in his holy habitation. | ταραχθήσονται ἀπὸ προσώπου αὐτοῦ, τοῦ πατρὸς τῶν ὀρφανῶν καὶ κριτοῦ τῶν χηρῶν· ὁ Θεὸς ἐν τόπῳ ἁγίῳ αὐτοῦ. |
| 6 | אֱלֹהִ֤ים ׀ מ֘וֹשִׁ֤יב יְחִידִ֨ים ׀ בַּ֗יְתָה מוֹצִ֣יא אֲ֭סִירִים בַּכּוֹשָׁר֑וֹת אַ֥ךְ ס֝וֹרְרִ֗ים שָׁכְנ֥וּ צְחִיחָֽה׃ | God setteth the solitary in families: he bringeth out those which are bound with chains: but the rebellious dwell in a dry land. | ὁ Θεὸς κατοικίζει μονοτρόπους ἐν οἴκῳ ἐξάγων πεπεδημένους ἐν ἀνδρείᾳ, ὁμοίως τοὺς παραπικραίνοντας, τοὺς κατοικοῦντας ἐν τάφοις. |
| 7 | אֱֽלֹהִ֗ים בְּ֭צֵאתְךָ לִפְנֵ֣י עַמֶּ֑ךָ בְּצַעְדְּךָ֖ בִישִׁימ֣וֹן סֶֽלָה׃ | O God, when thou wentest forth before thy people, when thou didst march through the wilderness; Selah: | ὁ Θεός, ἐν τῷ ἐκπορεύεσθαί σε ἐνώπιον τοῦ λαοῦ σου, ἐν τῷ διαβαίνειν σε ἐν τῇ ἐρήμῳ. (διάψαλμα). |
| 8 | אֶ֤רֶץ רָעָ֨שָׁה ׀ אַף־שָׁמַ֣יִם נָטְפוּ֮ מִפְּנֵ֢י אֱלֹ֫הִ֥ים זֶ֥ה סִינַ֑י מִפְּנֵ֥י אֱ֝לֹהִ֗ים אֱלֹהֵ֥י יִשְׂרָאֵֽל׃ | The earth shook, the heavens also dropped at the presence of God: even Sinai itself was moved at the presence of God, the God of Israel. | γῆ ἐσείσθη, καὶ γὰρ οἱ οὐρανοὶ ἔσταξαν ἀπὸ προσώπου τοῦ Θεοῦ τοῦ Σινᾶ, ἀπὸ προσώπου τοῦ Θεοῦ ᾿Ισραήλ. |
| 9 | גֶּ֣שֶׁם נְ֭דָבוֹת תָּנִ֣יף אֱלֹהִ֑ים נַחֲלָתְךָ֥ וְ֝נִלְאָ֗ה אַתָּ֥ה כוֹנַנְתָּֽהּ׃ | Thou, O God, didst send a plentiful rain, whereby thou didst confirm thine inheritance, when it was weary. | βροχὴν ἑκούσιον ἀφοριεῖς, ὁ Θεός, τῇ κληρονομίᾳ σου, καὶ ἠσθένησε, σὺ δὲ κατηρτίσω αὐτήν. |
| 10 | חַיָּתְךָ֥ יָשְׁבוּ־בָ֑הּ תָּ֤כִֽין בְּטוֹבָתְךָ֖ לֶֽעָנִ֣י אֱלֹהִֽים׃ | Thy congregation hath dwelt therein: thou, O God, hast prepared of thy goodness for the poor. | τὰ ζῷά σου κατοικοῦσιν ἐν αὐτῇ· ἡτοίμασας ἐν τῇ χρηστότητί σου τῷ πτωχῷ, ὁ Θεός. |
| 11 | אֲדֹנָ֥י יִתֶּן־אֹ֑מֶר הַ֝מְבַשְּׂר֗וֹת צָבָ֥א רָֽב׃ | The Lord gave the word: great was the company of those that published it. | Κύριος δώσει ῥῆμα τοῖς εὐαγγελιζομένοις δυνάμει πολλῇ, |
| 12 | מַלְכֵ֣י צְ֭בָאוֹת יִדֹּד֣וּן יִדֹּד֑וּן וּנְוַת־בַּ֝֗יִת תְּחַלֵּ֥ק שָׁלָֽל׃ | Kings of armies did flee apace: and she that tarried at home divided the spoil. | ὁ βασιλεὺς τῶν δυνάμεων τοῦ ἀγαπητοῦ, τῇ ὡραιότητι τοῦ οἴκου διελέσθαι σκῦλα. |
| 13 | אִֽם־תִּשְׁכְּבוּן֮ בֵּ֤ין שְׁפַ֫תָּ֥יִם כַּנְפֵ֣י י֭וֹנָה נֶחְפָּ֣ה בַכֶּ֑סֶף וְ֝אֶבְרוֹתֶ֗יהָ בִּירַקְרַ֥ק חָרֽוּץ׃ | Though ye have lien among the pots, yet shall ye be as the wings of a dove covered with silver, and her feathers with yellow gold. | ἐὰν κοιμηθῆτε ἀνὰ μέσον τῶν κλήρων, πτέρυγες περιστερᾶς περιηργυρωμέναι, καὶ τὰ μετάφρενα αὐτῆς ἐν χλωρότητι χρυσίου. |
| 14 | בְּפָ֘רֵ֤שׂ שַׁדַּ֓י מְלָ֘כִ֤ים בָּ֗הּ תַּשְׁלֵ֥ג בְּצַלְמֽוֹן׃ | When the Almighty scattered kings in it, it was white as snow in Salmon. | ἐν τῷ διαστέλλειν τὸν ἐπουράνιον βασιλεῖς ἐπ᾿ αὐτῆς, χιονωθήσονται ἐν Σελμών. |
| 15 | הַר־אֱ֭לֹהִים הַר־בָּשָׁ֑ן הַ֥ר גַּ֝בְנֻנִּ֗ים הַר־בָּשָֽׁן׃ | The hill of God is as the hill of Bashan; a high hill as the hill of Bashan. (Note: This verse has also been translated as The hill of God is a hill of fatness.) | ὄρος τοῦ Θεοῦ, ὄρος πῖον, ὄρος τετυρωμένον, ὄρος πῖον. |
| 16 | לָ֤מָּה ׀ תְּֽרַצְּדוּן֮ הָרִ֢ים גַּבְנֻ֫נִּ֥ים הָהָ֗ר חָמַ֣ד אֱלֹהִ֣ים לְשִׁבְתּ֑וֹ אַף־יְ֝הֹוָ֗ה יִשְׁכֹּ֥ן לָנֶֽצַח׃ | Why leap ye, ye high hills? this is the hill which God desireth to dwell in; yea, the LORD will dwell in it for ever. | ἱνατί ὑπολαμβάνετε, ὄρη τετυρωμένα, τὸ ὄρος, ὃ εὐδόκησεν ὁ Θεὸς κατοικεῖν ἐν αὐτῷ; καὶ γὰρ ὁ Κύριος κατασκηνώσει εἰς τέλος. |
| 17 | רֶ֤כֶב אֱלֹהִ֗ים רִבֹּתַ֣יִם אַלְפֵ֣י שִׁנְאָ֑ן אֲדֹנָ֥י בָֿ֝֗ם סִינַ֥י בַּקֹּֽדֶשׁ׃ | The chariots of God are twenty thousand, even thousands of angels: the Lord is among them, as in Sinai, in the holy place. | τὸ ἅρμα τοῦ Θεοῦ μυριοπλάσιον, χιλιάδες εὐθηνούντων· Κύριος ἐν αὐτοῖς ἐν Σινᾷ ἦν, ἐν τῷ ἁγίῳ. |
| 18 | עָ֘לִ֤יתָ לַמָּר֨וֹם ׀ שָׁ֘בִ֤יתָ שֶּׁ֗בִי לָקַ֣חְתָּ מַ֭תָּנוֹת בָּאָדָ֑ם וְאַ֥ף ס֝וֹרְרִ֗ים לִשְׁכֹּ֤ן ׀ יָ֬הּ אֱלֹהִֽים׃ | Thou hast ascended on high, thou hast led captivity captive: thou hast received gifts for men; yea, for the rebellious also, that the LORD God might dwell among them. | ἀνέβης εἰς ὕψος, ᾐχμαλώτευσας αἰχμαλωσίαν, ἔλαβες δόματα ἐν ἀνθρώποις, καὶ γὰρ ἀπειθοῦντας τοῦ κατασκηνῶσαι. |
| 19 | בָּ֤ר֣וּךְ אֲדֹנָי֮ י֤וֹם ׀ י֥֫וֹם יַעֲמׇס־לָ֗נוּ הָ֘אֵ֤ל יְֽשׁוּעָתֵ֬נוּ סֶֽלָה׃ | Blessed be the Lord, who daily loadeth us with benefits, even the God of our salvation. Selah. | Κύριος ὁ Θεὸς εὐλογητός, εὐλογητὸς Κύριος ἡμέραν καθ᾿ ἡμέραν· κατευοδώσαι ἡμῖν ὁ Θεὸς τῶν σωτηρίων ἡμῶν. (διάψαλμα). |
| 20 | הָ֤אֵ֣ל ׀ לָנוּ֮ אֵ֤ל לְֽמ֫וֹשָׁע֥וֹת וְלֵיהֹוִ֥ה אֲדֹנָ֑י לַ֝מָּ֗וֶת תֹּצָאֽוֹת׃ | He that is our God is the God of salvation; and unto GOD the Lord belong the issues from death. | ὁ Θεὸς ἡμῶν, ὁ Θεὸς τοῦ σῴζειν, καὶ τοῦ Κυρίου Κυρίου αἱ διέξοδοι τοῦ θανάτου. |
| 21 | אַךְ־אֱלֹהִ֗ים יִמְחַץ֮ רֹ֤אשׁ אֹ֫יְבָ֥יו קׇדְקֹ֥ד שֵׂעָ֑ר מִ֝תְהַלֵּ֗ךְ בַּאֲשָׁמָֽיו׃ | But God shall wound the head of his enemies, and the hairy scalp of such an one as goeth on still in his trespasses. | πλὴν ὁ Θεὸς συνθλάσει κεφαλὰς ἐχθρῶν αὐτοῦ, κορυφὴν τριχὸς διαπορευομένων ἐν πλημμελείαις αὐτῶν. |
| 22 | אָמַ֣ר אֲ֭דֹנָי מִבָּשָׁ֣ן אָשִׁ֑יב אָ֝שִׁ֗יב מִֽמְּצֻל֥וֹת יָֽם׃ | The Lord said, I will bring again from Bashan, I will bring my people again from the depths of the sea: | εἶπε Κύριος· ἐκ Βασὰν ἐπιστρέψω, ἐπιστρέψω ἐν βυθοῖς θαλάσσης. |
| 23 | לְמַ֤עַן ׀ תִּ֥מְחַ֥ץ רַגְלְךָ֗ בְּ֫דָ֥ם לְשׁ֥וֹן כְּלָבֶ֑יךָ מֵאֹיְבִ֥ים מִנֵּֽהוּ׃ | That thy foot may be dipped in the blood of thine enemies, and the tongue of thy dogs in the same. | ὅπως ἂν βαφῇ ὁ πούς σου ἐν αἵματι, ἡ γλῶσσα τῶν κυνῶν σου ἐξ ἐχθρῶν παρ᾿ αὐτοῦ. |
| 24 | רָא֣וּ הֲלִיכוֹתֶ֣יךָ אֱלֹהִ֑ים הֲלִ֘יכ֤וֹת אֵלִ֖י מַלְכִּ֣י בַקֹּֽדֶשׁ׃ | They have seen thy goings, O God; even the goings of my God, my King, in the sanctuary. | ἐθεωρήθησαν αἱ πορεῖαί σου, ὁ Θεός, αἱ πορεῖαι τοῦ Θεοῦ μου τοῦ βασιλέως τοῦ ἐν τῷ ἁγίῳ. |
| 25 | קִדְּמ֣וּ שָׁ֭רִים אַחַ֣ר נֹגְנִ֑ים בְּת֥וֹךְ עֲ֝לָמ֗וֹת תּוֹפֵפֽוֹת׃ | The singers went before, the players on instruments followed after; among them were the damsels playing with timbrels. | προέφθασαν ἄρχοντες ἐχόμενοι ψαλλόντων ἐν μέσῳ νεανίδων τυμπανιστριῶν. |
| 26 | בְּֽ֭מַקְהֵלוֹת בָּרְכ֣וּ אֱלֹהִ֑ים אֲ֝דֹנָ֗י מִמְּק֥וֹר יִשְׂרָאֵֽל׃ | Bless ye God in the congregations, even the Lord, from the fountain of Israel. | ἐν ἐκκλησίαις εὐλογεῖτε τὸν Θεόν, Κύριον ἐκ πηγῶν ᾿Ισραήλ. |
| 27 | שָׁ֤ם בִּנְיָמִ֨ן ׀ צָעִ֡יר רֹדֵ֗ם שָׂרֵ֣י יְ֭הוּדָה רִגְמָתָ֑ם שָׂרֵ֥י זְ֝בֻל֗וּן שָׂרֵ֥י נַפְתָּלִֽי׃ | There is little Benjamin with their ruler, the princes of Judah and their council, the princes of Zebulun, and the princes of Naphtali. | ἐκεῖ Βενιαμὶν νεώτερος ἐν ἐκστάσει, ἄρχοντες ᾿Ιούδα ἡγεμόνες αὐτῶν, ἄρχοντες Ζαβουλών, ἄρχοντες Νεφθαλείμ. |
| 28 | צִוָּ֥ה אֱלֹהֶ֗יךָ עֻ֫זֶּ֥ךָ עוּזָּ֥ה אֱלֹהִ֑ים ז֝֗וּ פָּעַ֥לְתָּ לָּֽנוּ׃ | Thy God hath commanded thy strength: strengthen, O God, that which thou hast wrought for us. | ἔντειλαι, ὁ Θεός, τῇ δυνάμει σου, δυνάμωσον, ὁ Θεός, τοῦτο, ὃ κατειργάσω ἐν ἡμῖν. |
| 29 | מֵ֭הֵיכָלֶךָ עַל־יְרוּשָׁלָ֑͏ִם לְךָ֤ יוֹבִ֖ילוּ מְלָכִ֣ים שָֽׁי׃ | Because of thy temple at Jerusalem shall kings bring presents unto thee. | ἀπὸ τοῦ ναοῦ σου ἐπὶ ῾Ιερουσαλὴμ σοὶ οἴσουσι βασιλεῖς δῶρα. |
| 30 | גְּעַ֨ר חַיַּ֪ת קָנֶ֡ה עֲדַ֤ת אַבִּירִ֨ים ׀ בְּעֶגְלֵ֬י עַמִּ֗ים מִתְרַפֵּ֥ס בְּרַצֵּי־כָ֑סֶף בִּזַּ֥ר עַ֝מִּ֗ים קְרָב֥וֹת יֶחְפָּֽצוּ׃ | Rebuke the company of spearmen, the multitude of the bulls, with the calves of the people, till every one submit himself with pieces of silver: scatter thou the people that delight in war. | ἐπιτίμησον τοῖς θηρίοις τοῦ καλάμου· ἡ συναγωγὴ τῶν ταύρων ἐν ταῖς δαμάλεσι τῶν λαῶν τοῦ ἐγκλεισθῆναι τοὺς δεδοκιμασμένους τῷ ἀργυρίῳ· διασκόρπισον ἔθνη τὰ τοὺς πολέμους θέλοντα. |
| 31 | יֶאֱתָ֣יוּ חַ֭שְׁמַנִּים מִנִּ֣י מִצְרָ֑יִם כּ֥וּשׁ תָּרִ֥יץ יָ֝דָ֗יו לֵאלֹהִֽים׃ | Princes shall come out of Egypt; Ethiopia shall soon stretch out her hands unto God. | ἥξουσι πρέσβεις ἐξ Αἰγύπτου, Αἰθιοπία προφθάσει χεῖρα αὐτῆς τῷ Θεῷ. |
| 32 | מַמְלְכ֣וֹת הָ֭אָרֶץ שִׁ֣ירוּ לֵאלֹהִ֑ים זַמְּר֖וּ אֲדֹנָ֣י סֶֽלָה׃ | Sing unto God, ye kingdoms of the earth; O sing praises unto the Lord; Selah: | αἱ βασιλεῖαι τῆς γῆς, ᾄσατε τῷ Θεῷ, ψάλατε τῷ Κυρίῳ. (διάψαλμα). |
| 33 | לָ֭רֹכֵב בִּשְׁמֵ֣י שְׁמֵי־קֶ֑דֶם הֵ֥ן יִתֵּ֥ן בְּ֝קוֹל֗וֹ ק֣וֹל עֹֽז׃ | To him that rideth upon the heavens of heavens, which were of old; lo, he doth send out his voice, and that a mighty voice. | ψάλατε τῷ Θεῷ τῷ ἐπιβεβηκότι ἐπὶ τὸν οὐρανὸν τοῦ οὐρανοῦ κατὰ ἀνατολάς· ἰδοὺ δώσει τῇ φωνῇ αὐτοῦ φωνὴν δυνάμεως. |
| 34 | תְּנ֥וּ עֹ֗ז לֵאלֹ֫הִ֥ים עַֽל־יִשְׂרָאֵ֥ל גַּאֲוָת֑וֹ וְ֝עֻזּ֗וֹ בַּשְּׁחָקִֽים׃ | Ascribe ye strength unto God: his excellency is over Israel, and his strength is in the clouds. | δότε δόξαν τῷ Θεῷ· ἐπὶ τὸν ᾿Ισραὴλ ἡ μεγαλοπρέπεια αὐτοῦ, καὶ ἡ δύναμις αὐτοῦ ἐν ταῖς νεφέλαις. |
| 35 | נ֤וֹרָ֥א אֱלֹהִ֗ים מִֽמִּקְדָּ֫שֶׁ֥יךָ אֵ֤ל יִשְׂרָאֵ֗ל ה֤וּא נֹתֵ֨ן ׀ עֹ֖ז וְתַעֲצֻמ֥וֹת לָעָ֗ם בָּר֥וּךְ אֱלֹהִֽים׃ | O God, thou art terrible out of thy holy places: the God of Israel is he that giveth strength and power unto his people. Blessed be God. | θαυμαστὸς ὁ Θεὸς ἐν τοῖς ἁγίοις αὐτοῦ· ὁ Θεὸς ᾿Ισραήλ, αὐτὸς δώσει δύναμιν καὶ κραταίωσιν τῷ λαῷ αὐτοῦ. εὐλογητὸς ὁ Θεός. |
