= Friedrich Richter =

Friedrich Richter may refer to:

- Friedrich Adolf Richter (1847–1910), German toy manufacturer
- Friedrich-Wilhelm Richter (1911–1989), Waffen-SS officer
- Friedrich Richter (officer) (1910–1969), Wehrmacht officer
- Friedrich Richter (actor) (1894–1984), German actor
