= Friedrich Adolf Richter =

German entrepreneur and toy manufacturer (1846–1910)

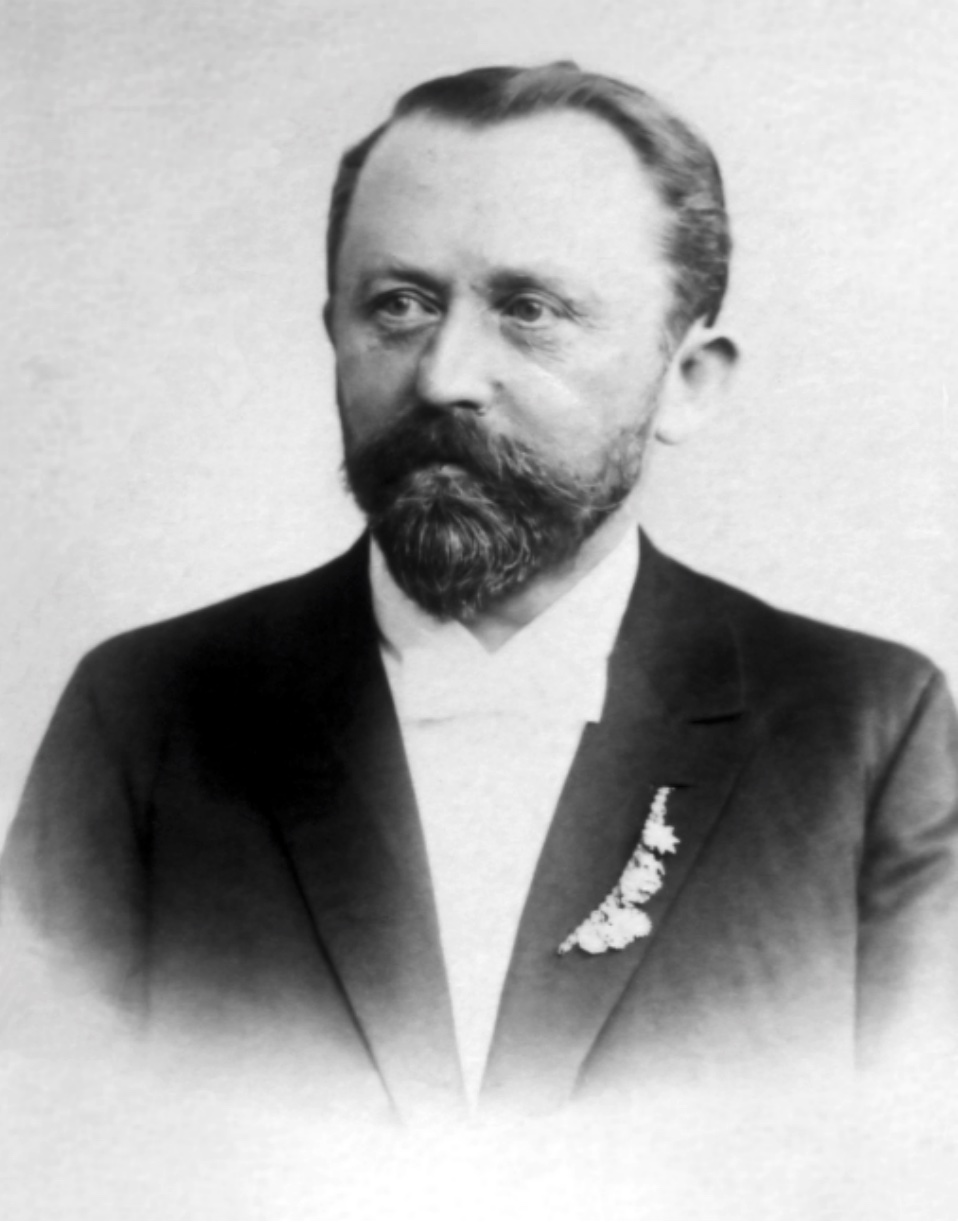
- Friedrich Adolf Richter
- Born: May 12, 1846; Herford, Germany
- Died: December 25, 1910 (aged 64)
- Occupation: Entrepreneur
- Known for: Founder of Richter (toy company)

Friedrich Adolf Richter (12 May 1846 – 25 December 1910) was a German entrepreneur and pharmaceutical manufacturer, best known as the founder of F. Ad. Richter & Cie and the producer of the Anchor Stone building sets (German: Anker-Steinbaukasten).

== Early life ==
Richter was born on 12 May 1846 in Herford in Germany, the son of a master baker. In 1876 the Principality of Schwarzburg-Rudolstadt granted him permission to build a chemical-pharmaceutical factory in the princely residence town of Rudolstadt, where he had already been operating as a manufacturer of proprietary medicines.

== Patent medicine business ==
By 1873 Richter had founded his first factory in Nuremberg, producing gingerbread (Lebkuchen). It was only in 1876, with the opening of "F. Ad. Richter & Cie." in Rudolstadt, that his product line expanded to include pharmaceutical preparations; from the outset the Rudolstadt firm's range was highly diversified, spanning pharmaceuticals, chocolate, gingerbread, confectionery, children's toys, and — in time — music automatons, music boxes, and mechanical phonograph records, most of it marketed under the "Anker" (Anchor) brand. His flagship pharmaceutical product was the analgesic liniment marketed as "Anker-Pain-Expeller," sold for the relief of rheumatism, gout, and neuralgia.

According to a 2017 peer-reviewed historical account by anesthesiologist George S. Bause, published in the American Society of Anesthesiologists' Wood Library-Museum "Reflections" series in Anesthesiology, Richter falsely claimed to hold a Doctor of Medicine degree from a "University of Philadelphia" that did not exist, and sold his remedies by mail order within Germany through a pharmacy that also did not exist, in violation of German pharmaceutical law. In 1907, analytical pharmacists determined that the Pain Expeller consisted of chili, black, and guinea peppers "doctored" with galangal root, astringent rhatany, and oils of thyme, clove, rosemary, and lavender. Despite this, Richter died in 1910 as one of Germany's ten wealthiest citizens.

== Acquisition of the stone building-block patent ==
In 1880 the brothers Otto and Gustav Lilienthal – the former later known as a pioneering aviator – had developed a method of pressing stable building blocks from quartz sand, powdered chalk and linseed oil varnish, then curing them at high temperature. Lacking the capital to bring the invention to market themselves, the brothers sold the idea to Richter, who built a new factory in Rudolstadt for its production. The first sets were manufactured in 1882 and initially sold as Patent-Baukästen under a red-squirrel trademark designed by Gustav Lilienthal; from 1895 the squirrel was replaced by the anchor emblem already associated with Richter's other products, giving the sets their lasting name. A protracted patent and legal dispute between the Lilienthal brothers and Richter over the invention followed and was ultimately won by Richter.

== Business ==
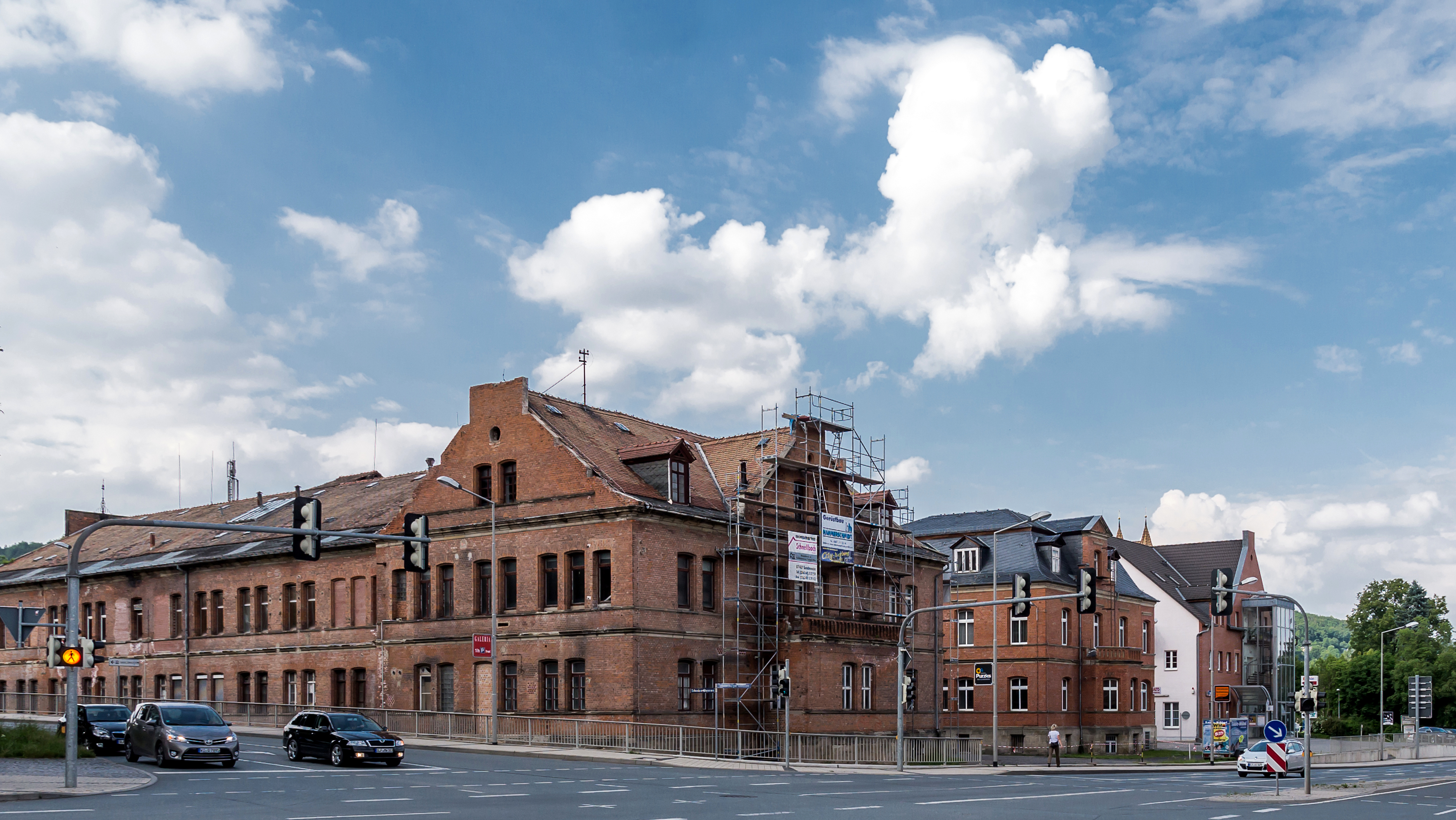
The former Ankerwerk factory complex on Schwarzburger Chaussee in Rudolstadt, now a protected heritage site

Under Richter, F. Ad. Richter & Cie grew into an international manufacturer of toys and proprietary medicines. By the time of his death in 1910 the firm's headquarters and main factory remained in Rudolstadt, with additional factories in Vienna (where its Anchor Stone building blocks were also produced, alongside a sales branch at Nibelungengasse 4) and, on a smaller scale, in New York and at Sablino near Saint Petersburg, together with further branch offices in Berlin, Konstein, Leipzig, Nuremberg, Olten, Prague, Rotterdam, and St. Petersburg; several earlier branches in Bilthoven, Brussels, London, and Reims had closed within a few years of opening. The firm held the title of k.u.k. Hof- und Kammerlieferant (Imperial and Royal Purveyor) to the Austro-Hungarian court and supplied several other European royal households; Anchor-brand toys were used in the nurseries of numerous European royal families. The firm's Anker trademark also covered a line of gramophones and shellac phonograph records marketed as Anker-Record, sold until the business was divested amid the First World War, after Richter's death.

== Death and legacy ==
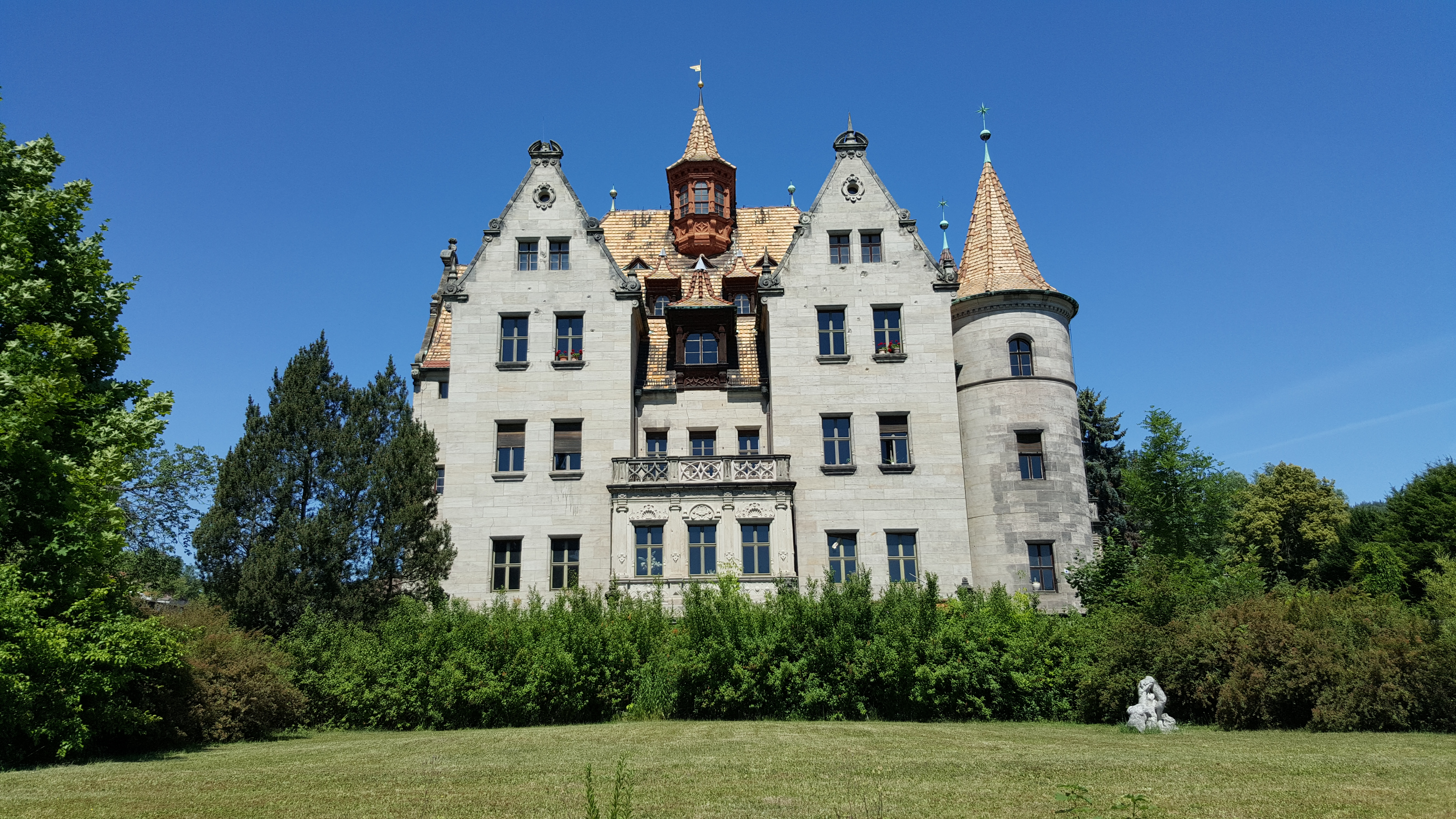
The Richtersche Villa in Rudolstadt, built for Richter and later home to Alfred Eversbusch (photographed 2015)

Richter died on 25 December 1910 in Jena following a surgical procedure. At his death the company had branches across Europe and the United States; his son, also named Adolf Richter, continued to run the business. The Richtersche Villa in Rudolstadt was taken over in 1921 by Alfred Eversbusch, later the main shareholder of the Ankerwerk, from Richter's heirs; expropriated during the German Democratic Republic era, the property was only regained by an Eversbusch heir after German reunification, through a right of first refusal.

== Honours ==
Richter received numerous honours over his career, including the Grand Ducal Baden Order of the Zähringer Lion (Knight First Class), the Prussian Order of the Crown, a knighthood in the Portuguese Order of Christ, honorary membership of the French Academy of Sciences, and honorary citizenship of Rudolstadt, along with purveyor warrants from the Bavarian, Italian and Portuguese royal houses. Several of the foreign honours are understood to have been obtained, at least in part, through financial contributions to the awarding courts.
