= Josef Weiß =

Josef Weiß may refer to:

- Josef Weiss, also given as Josef Weiß, Hungarian composer and pianist
- Josef Weiss, an Austrian international footballer
- Sepp Weiß, also known as Josef Weiß, German footballer
