= Richter (toy company) =

German manufacturing company

F. Ad. Richter & Cie
- Type: Private
- Industry: Manufacturing, toys, pharmaceuticals, music boxes, gramophones
- Founder: Friedrich Adolf Richter
- Headquarters: Rudolstadt, Germany
- Area served: Germany, Austria, USA, Russia
- Key people: Friedrich Adolf Richter
- Products: Anchor Stone building sets, pharmaceuticals, music boxes, gramophones
- Owner: Richter family / enthusiasts (after 1995 refounding)

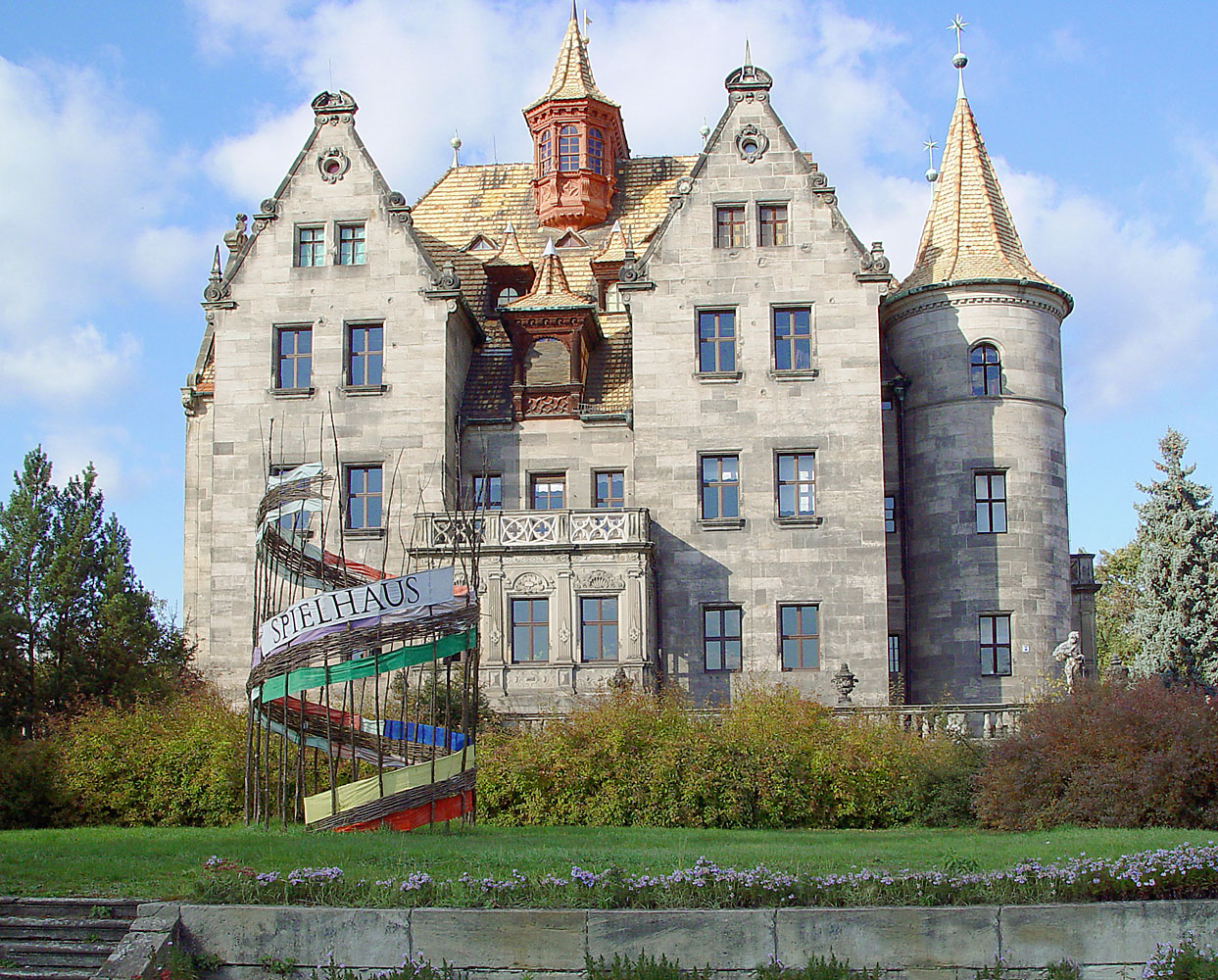
The Richtersche Villa in Rudolstadt

F. Ad. Richter & Cie was founded and owned by Friedrich Adolf Richter. This German manufacturer produced many products, including pharmaceuticals, music boxes, gramophones, and Anchor Stone building sets. The firm's phonograph business was later sold under the Anker-Record trademark. Richter established his main factory in Rudolstadt, Germany, with other factories in Vienna Austria, Nuremberg Germany, New York City USA, and St. Petersburg, Russia. In addition, the company had operations for internal supply in Konstein, Germany (glass bottles) and Leipzig, Germany (publishing - printing was done in Rudolstadt).

Friedrich Adolf Richter was born 1847 in Herford, North Rhine-Westphalia and died 1910 in Jena. The Anker factory produced the popular Anchor Stone Blocks from the 1880 up to 1963.

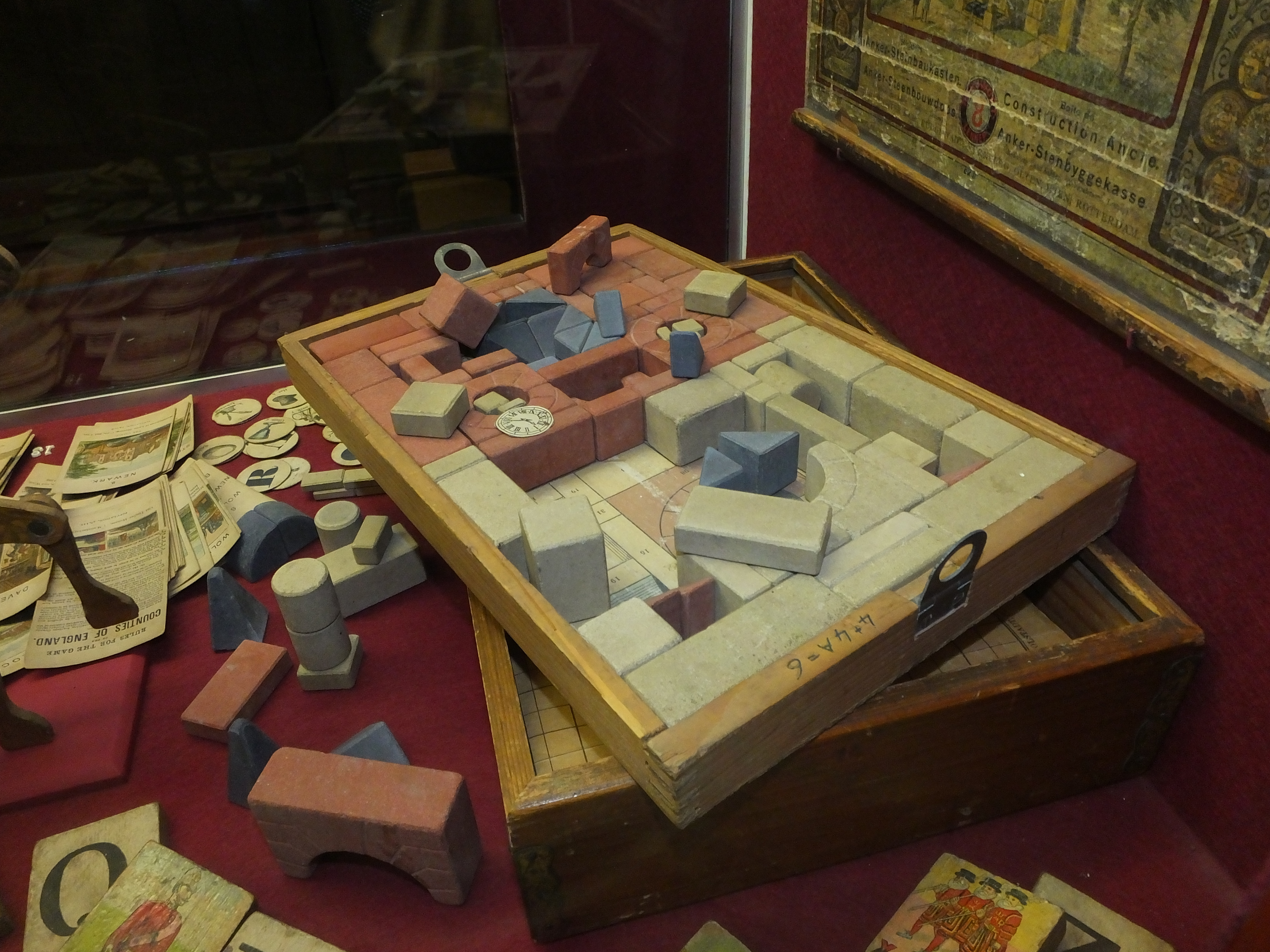
An Anker-Steinbaukasten (Anchor Stone building set), from the collection of the Rochester Guildhall Museum, Kent

The factory was refounded in 1995 by a group of enthusiasts and began producing some of the old sets again. They are also selling toys in Grayford.

== See also ==
- Friedrich Adolf Richter
- Anchor Stone Blocks
- Anker-Record
