= Ludger Rémy =

- Born: 4 February 1949; Kalkar, Allied-occupied Germany
- Died: 21 June 2017 (aged 68); Bremen, Germany
- Occupations: Harpsichordist; Conductor; Musicologist; Academic teacher
- Organizations: Folkwang Hochschule; Hochschule für Musik "Franz Liszt", Weimar; Hochschule für Musik Carl Maria von Weber Dresden

Ludger Rémy (4 February 1949 – 21 June 2017) was a German harpsichordist, conductor and musicologist.

== Biography ==
Born in Kalkar, Ludger Rémy studied the harpsichord in Freiburg im Breisgau and continued his studies with Kenneth Gilbert in Paris. He was a teacher at several German academies including the Folkwang Hochschule and the Hochschule für Musik "Franz Liszt", Weimar. In 1998 he was appointed professor for Early music at the Hochschule für Musik Carl Maria von Weber Dresden.

His main interest was to research German music of the 17th and 18th century and to revive the discovered works in performances and recordings, taking into account their position in historic and literary context.

In 1994 he founded the orchestra Les Amis de Philippe, named after Carl Philipp Emanuel Bach. From 1995 to 1999 he directed the Telemann Chamber Orchestra of Michaelstein. He taught at the Stiftung Kloster Michaelstein. On 23 September 2005 he revived the opera Didone abbandonata of Domenico Sarro to a libretto by Pietro Metastasio, successful in 1724, in a shortened concert version, performed at the Schloss Elisabethenburg in Meiningen by Les Amis de Philippe.

Between 1995 and 2007 he served as a juror at the International Competition for harpsichord and Fortepiano at the Festival van Vlaanderen in Bruges.

He died on 21 June 2017 at the age of 68.

== Selected recordings ==
As a harpsichordist he recorded in 1995 concertos of Carl Philipp Emanuel Bach with Les Amis de Philippe, conducting from the instrument. The recording was nominated for the Cannes Classical Award 1997 and followed by a recording of three more concertos in 1997. In 2004 he recorded Lieder of Georg Philipp Telemann with Klaus Mertens.

As a conductor, he recorded in 1999 a collection of four church cantatas, Philipp Heinrich Erlebach's Gelobet sei der Herr täglich combined with two works by Georg Benda and one by Carl Friedrich Gessel, with the Michaelstein Telemann Chamber Orchestra. The same year, he recorded in 1999 Telemann's oratorio Der Tod Jesu with soloists Dorothee Mields, Britta Schwarz, Jan Kobow, Klaus Mertens, the Magdeburger Kammerchor and the Telemann Chamber Orchestra. The recording was awarded the Preis der Deutschen Schallplattenkritik in 2000. In 2002 he recorded several cantatas for Pentecost of Gottfried Heinrich Stölzel, a prolific contemporary of Bach. In 2004 he recorded Georg Gebel's Johannespassion with Dorothee Mields, Henning Voss, Jan Kobow, Klaus Mertens, Sebastian Bluth, the ensemble inCanto Weimar and the Weimar Baroque Ensembles.
