= EPC Group =

German engineering and construction company

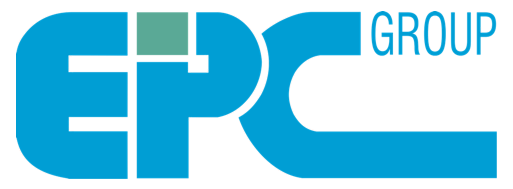

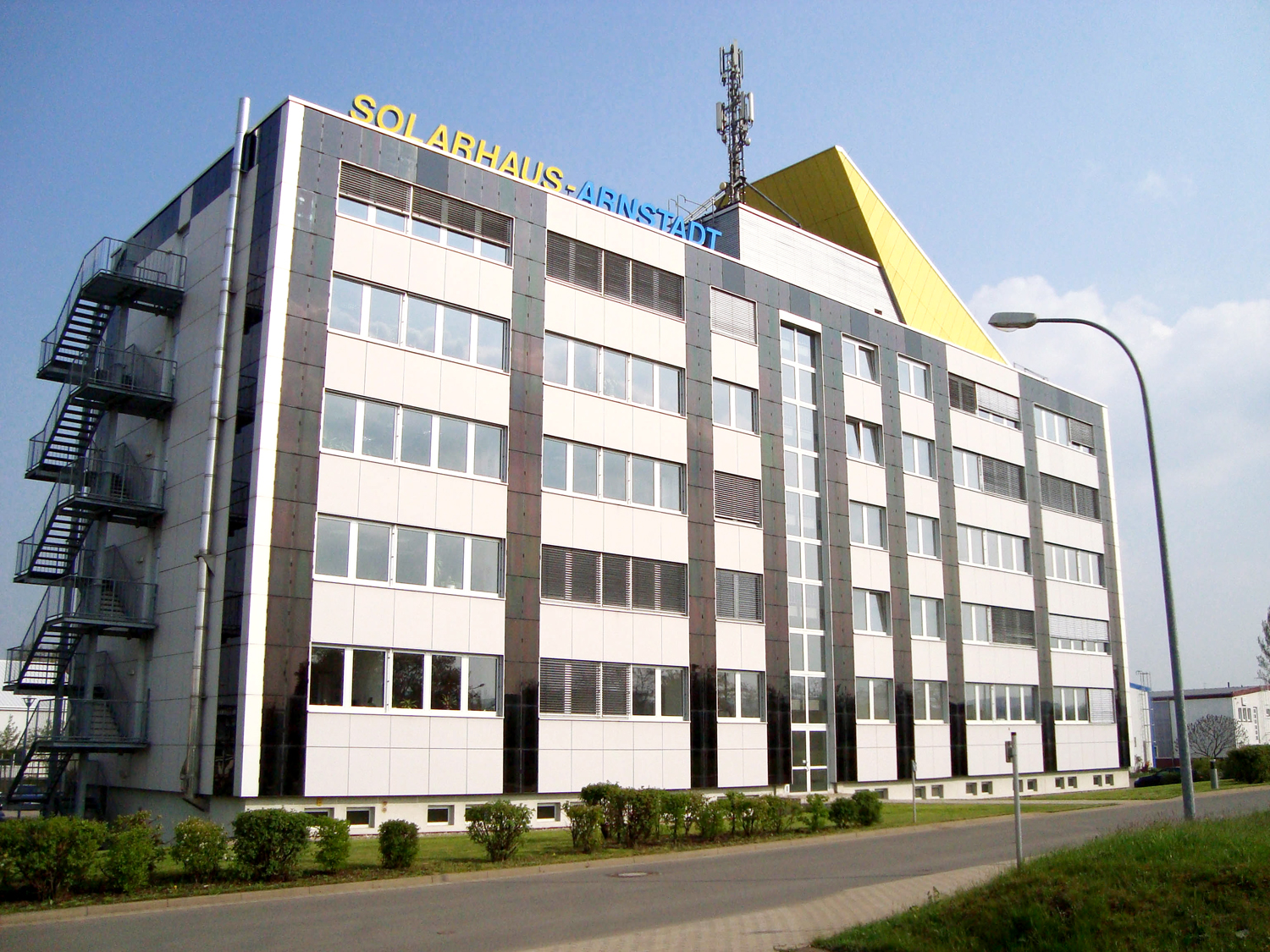
- Headquarters in Arnstadt
- Company type: private (GmbH)
- Founded: 1994 in Rudolstadt
- Founder: Peter Henkel
- Headquarters: Arnstadt, Germany
- Number of locations: 7 (2023)
- Area served: worldwide
- Key people: Jens Henkel; Ulf Henkel; Nadine Henkel; Tim Henkel
- Products: industrial plants (turnkey facilities)
- Brands: EPC; EPCat; EPC inside PET; EPC PETvantage; EPC variPLANT; EPC variPILOT; EPC variYARN
- Services: technology licensing, engineering, construction
- Owners: Henkel family
- Number of employees: 160 (2023)
- Subsidiaries: EPC Engineering & Technologies GmbH; HI Bauprojekt GmbH
- Website: epc.com

EPC Group is a German engineering and construction company. It builds large industrial plants and infrastructure projects around the world. The history of the family business goes back to the 19th century and in the present form, it exists since 1994. The headquarters of the EPC Group are located in Arnstadt, Thuringia. 2014, the EPC Group was named one of the top 100 innovators of the German Mittelstand. In November 2017, the German Business Magazine WirtschaftsWoche honored the subsidiary company EPC Engineering & Technologies GmbH (ranked at position 28 among the 50 most innovative small and medium-sized companies in Germany) as the most innovative company in the Eastern part of Germany.

== History ==
The roots of the EPC Group go back to 1873, when August Oskar Henkel registered business to the princedom of Schwarzburg-Rudolstadt. The purpose of the company was agricultural machinery engineering. Until 1933, the Henkel family successfully produced several types of machines. After World War II, the company was discontinued, but the owners kept working as engineers. After the German reunification, Peter Henkel founded the EPC Engineering Consulting GmbH as a limited liability company (Gesellschaft mit beschränkter Haftung) in 1993. The company began trading in 1994. The company was a spin-off of the Chemiefaserkombinat Schwarza, a former publicly owned operation (Volkseigener Betrieb) in East Germany. In the early days of the EPC Group, the company recruited many employees of the Chemiefaserkombinat Schwarza, particularly chemists and engineers. Some of them have worked for the engineering business unit of the Thüringer Faser AG, one of the successor companies of the Chemiefaserkombinat Schwarza.

The company's activities were crucial for the development of the Chemiefaserkombinat Schwarza to a modern industrial park for industries of all kind. 1995, Peter Henkel founded a second company named EPC Technology GmbH. Today, both the EPC Engineering Consulting GmbH and the EPC Technology GmbH, as well as other companies, are subsidiaries of the EPC Holding GmbH, doing business as EPC Group. Ten years after its foundation, the EPC Group and all of its subsidiaries had about 150 employees. In the following years, exports continuously increased, especially to the Arab world, Asia and Russia. For example, the EPC Group built a plant for plastic granulates in Saudi Arabia, which is one of the largest revamp projects in the world. Similar facilities for the production of Polycarbonate have been built in China, with a capacity of more than 100,000 tons per year. These projects were recognized as important for both the company and the whole industry. In 2009, the EPC Group acquired the CRYOTEC Anlagenbau GmbH, a cryogenic plant construction company in Wurzen, Saxony, with roots going back to the year 1879. They have terminated the cooperation in the year 2023. Today, the companies HI Bauprojekt GmbH and RMN Ingenieure GmbH are also part of the EPC Group.

== Operations ==
The EPC Group builds turnkey facilities for chemicals, polymers and fibers, pharma and fine chemicals, renewable energies, technical gases and biotechnologies, as well as infrastructure projects. In addition to the design and construction, the supervision of the commissioning and operation of industrial plants are an important part of the business. Most of the revenues come from projects in foreign countries. The shareholders of the EPC Group are Jens, Ulf, Nadine and Tim Henkel, the second generation of their family to run the company. Since 2021, the managing board was expanded with Karol Kerrane and Franz-Josef Willems, stepping into their roles as managing directors. The headquarters of the EPC Holding GmbH, which is the holding company of the EPC Group, are in Meuselbach-Schwarzmühle, where the machinery factory of August Oskar Henkel was located. The EPC Group and all of its subsidiaries have locations in Alzenau, Arnstadt, Gera, Jena, Leuna, Rudolstadt as well as Wurzen. Another office in the Thuringian state capital of Erfurt is being planned.

Since 2000, the EPC Group is a member of the Bundesverband mittelständische Wirtschaft e.V. (BVMW), a well-known German association for small and medium-sized enterprises. The EPC Group continually supports regional sports teams, for example the football club FC Einheit Rudolstadt.
