= Remda-Teichel =

- Stadtteil of Rudolstadt
- Coat of arms
- Interactive map of Remda-Teichel
- Location within Germany Location within Thuringia
- Coordinates: 50°46′N 11°15′E
- Country: Germany
- State: Thuringia
- District: Saalfeld-Rudolstadt
- Town: Rudolstadt
- Subdivisions: 12

Area
  - Total: 79.76 km^{2} (30.80 sq mi)
- Elevation: 319 m (1,047 ft)

Population (2017-12-31)
  - Total: 2,898
  - Density: 36.33/km^{2} (94.10/sq mi)
- Time zone: UTC+01:00 (CET)
  - Summer (DST): UTC+02:00 (CEST)
- Postal codes: 07407
- Dialling codes: 036744 (Remda); 036743 (Teichel)
- Website: www.remda-teichel.de

Remda-Teichel (German pronunciation: [ˈʁɛmda ˈtaɪçl̩]) is a town and a former municipality in the district of Saalfeld-Rudolstadt, in Thuringia, Germany. It is situated 15 km northwest of Saalfeld, and 28 km southeast of Erfurt. Since 1 January 2019, it is part of the town Rudolstadt.
