= Josef Weiss =

Hungarian composer and pianist (1864–1945)

- Born: 5 November 1864; Kassa, Kingdom of Hungary, Austrian Empire
- Died: 1945 (aged 80); Budapest Ghetto, Hungary
- Education: Budapest Conservatory; Vienna Conservatory
- Occupations: Pianist; Composer; Music educator
- Organizations: Neue Akademie der Tonkunst; Saint Petersburg Conservatory

Josef Weiss (also Weiß, 5 November 1864 – 1945) was a Hungarian composer and pianist. He began his career as a concert pianist in 1877 at the age of 13. He performed in concert halls internationally through 1924, and was particularly admired for his performances of the works of Johannes Brahms, Frédéric Chopin, and Franz Liszt; the latter of whom was his teacher. He made several recordings for Berlin-based Anker-Record and Berlin music publisher Carl Simon published a number of his compositions. He was notably the first composer to write a film score for a German language film, writing music that accompanied the premiere of The Student of Prague in 1913. His piano score for that film was later orchestrated for presentations of that film at music festivals internationally in 2013. A victim of the Holocaust, he died while interned in the Budapest Ghetto in 1945.

Weiss was a gifted concert pianist who played best when in lower pressure situations. High stress environments had a negative impact on both his playing, and temperament. In 1910 a highly publicized incident occurred between Weiss and conductor Gustav Mahler during a rehearsal with the New York Philharmonic at Carnegie Hall. Some sources alleged that Weiss attacked Mahler during an argument with the conductor with his music score, whereas others claimed he merely threw his score on the ground or slammed the piano shut during a heated argument. Sources agree that Weiss left the rehearsal and that the orchestra was forced to find another player at the last minute for their impending concert. This widely publicized event had a negative impact on Weiss's reputation, although Mahler continued to hold Weiss in high esteem as a concert pianist and maintained a friendship with the pianist after this event occurred.

== Early life and education ==
Born in Košice, Josef Weiss was the son of Hungarian Jewish parents Emil and Charlotte Weiss. A child prodigy, he began his career as a concert pianist at the age of 13. Like his brother, the composer Henri Berény, he was a pupil of Franz Liszt at the Budapest Conservatory. His other teachers there included Ferenc Erkel and Robert Volkmann. He then studied music composition at the Vienna Conservatory where one of his classmates and friends was Leoš Janáček. After this he studied piano in Germany with Moritz Moszkowski.

== Career as pianist, composer, and teacher ==
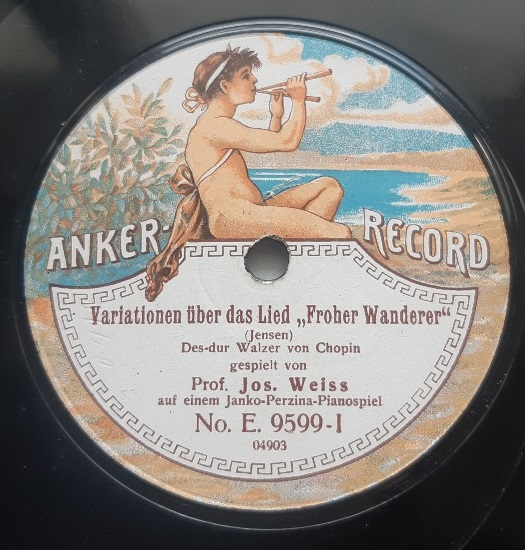
1911 shellac record made by Anker-Record with Weiss performing a work by Chopin.

Like many musician composers of his era, Weiss divided his time between performing, composing, and teaching. After graduating from the Vienna Conservatory he joined the faculty of Theodor Kullak's music school, the Neue Akademie der Tonkunst. His first success as a composer was his Piano Concerto, Op. 13 for which he was the piano soloist in its premiere with Berlin's Philharmonic Orchestra (precursor to the Berlin Philharmonic) on 30 December 1890. He performed this work again in Weimar under the baton of Richard Strauss the following year.

In 1891 he was invited by Anton Rubinstein to join the faculty at the Saint Petersburg Conservatory where he taught through 1893. He gave a series of recitals in New York City at Mendelssohn Hall in 1898–1899 where he drew particular praise from critics for his playing of the works of Brahms. He returned periodically to New York, most notably serving as accompanist to Emma Nevada for performances at the Metropolitan Opera. He also gave a series of piano concerts in the United States sponsored by Steinway & Sons.

Weiss made his home in Germany, living in both Leipzig and Berlin. As a composer his works were written entirely for the piano. Several of his compositions were published by the Berlin music publisher Carl Simon, and he also made several recordings with the Berlin-based record company Anker-Record. He gained a reputation as a great interpreter of the works of Johannes Brahms, Frédéric Chopin, and Liszt. His inventive interpretations of Liszt's Hungarian Rhapsodies recorded for Anker-Record in 1910 has been of particular interest to music historians and record collectors.

In 1913 Weiss wrote a piano score to accompany the silent film The Student of Prague (Der Student von Prag); a groundbreaking work regarded as the first German art film. It was the first score ever composed for a German film, and Weiss performed the music at its premiere. Weiss had intended to orchestrate the score, but this never occurred. At the centennial of the film, his piano score was presented in an arrangement for chamber orchestra that was orchestrated by Bernd Thewes which was recorded for presentations of the film at international film festivals in 2013.

In 1914 Weiss joined the faculty of the Stern Conservatory in Berlin. From 1920 to 1924 he toured widely as a concert pianist, appearing in concerts in Paris, Chicago, London, Leipzig, Budapest, Vienna, and New York City among other locations while maintaining a residence in Berlin.

== Reputation ==
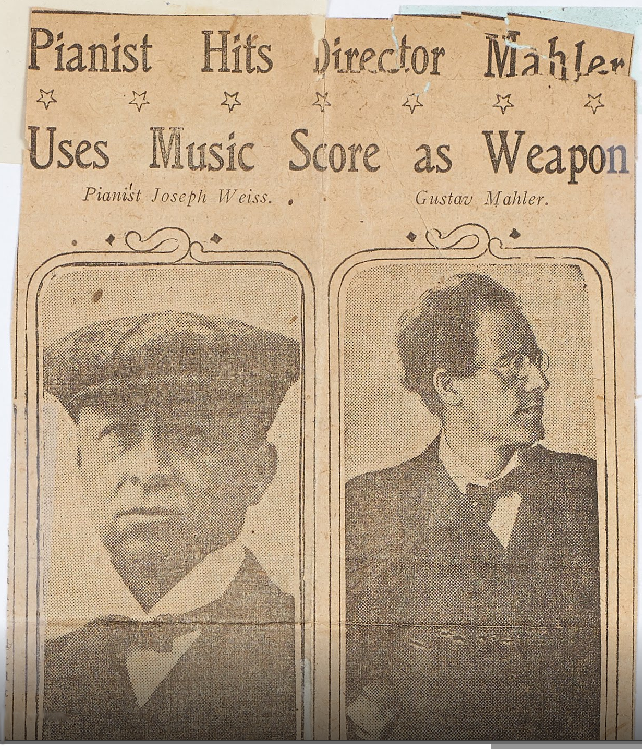
Press clipping from 31 January 1910, covering the incident between Weiss (left) and Mahler (right).

Weiss's reputation as a pianist was marred by personal issues in relation to both nerves and his temper. Ernő Dohnányi lamented that Weiss's inability to control nervousness was a detriment to his playing. He considered Weiss the "greatest pianist in the world" when he was playing in low pressure concerts, but noted that in high pressure situations Weiss's nerves made his playing "exaggerated and distorted". At times, his behavior in concerts displayed eccentric and erratic behavior which historian Gregor Benko considered similar to, but more aggressive than, that of concert pianist Vladimir de Pachmann; another pianist of that period known for an odd demeanor in concerts.

In 1910 Weiss had a high-profile outburst in a rehearsal with Gustav Mahler and the New York Philharmonic at Carnegie Hall. Accounts vary, with some sources claiming the men merely shouted and exchanged rude words with one another which ended with Weiss slamming the piano shut and leaving the rehearsal. Other sources claim that Weiss threw and struck Mahler with his piano score for Schumann's Piano Concerto and had to be forcibly restrained from physically attacking Mahler before leaving. Other accounts suggest that Weiss merely threw his score angrily on the ground, but not at Mahler. Regardless, Weiss's decision to leave the rehearsal required that the orchestra find a last minute soloist for their impending concert, and this event negatively impacted his reputation.

In spite of this incident, Mahler considered Weiss to be the "greatest pianist he had ever heard" and the two men maintained a friendship.

== Later life and death ==
With the rise of Nazi Germany Weiss fled Berlin in 1936 and made his way to the city of Košice. Unable to take much with him beyond what he could carry in a suitcase, he had little resources and was homeless. He had a nomadic existence over the next few years, spending time first in Italy and then in Switzerland before returning to Hungary in 1939 where he settled in Budapest.

Weiss was a victim of the Holocaust. He was involuntarily interned in the Budapest Ghetto and was one of the first 80 people placed in that Nazi ghetto in November 1944. He died in that ghetto in 1945 in unknown circumstances. It is possible that he may have died doing forced labor or participating in a death march.
