= Anker-Record =

German record label active 1905–1914

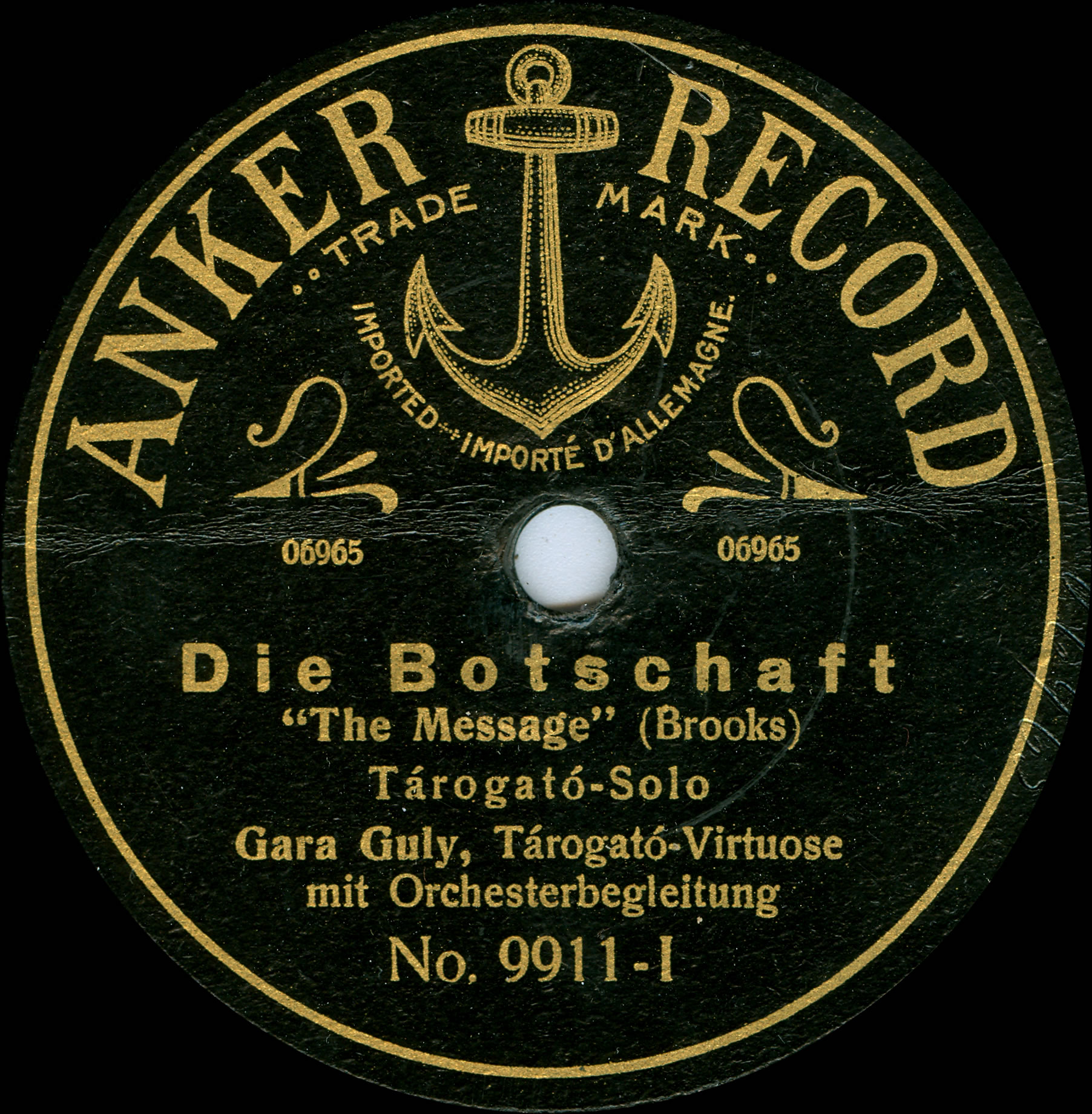
An "Anker Record" label for a tárogató solo by Gara Guly with orchestral accompaniment, c. 1915

Anker–Record, also known as Anker-Rekord, was a trademark used in the early 20th century for gramophone records (shellac records). The label sticker applied to the discs at times featured a stylized anchor as its logo, along with details of the recorded piece, the performer's name, and a running serial number for the title.

== History ==
The Anker trademark was originally used by the firm F. Adolf Richter & Co. in Rudolstadt, Thuringia. Recordings were made until 1906 by the Berlin-based National Phonogramm GmbH. From December 1907, production passed to the Anker Phonogramm Gesellschaft, based in Berlin, which recorded the music and also handled sales of the records.

Later, "Anker Rekord" discs, together with the patent-protected "Anker-Resonanz-Sprechapparate" (a type of gramophone), were manufactured and sold jointly with products of the record label Kalliope, through the Berlin firm Menzenhauer & Schmidt (owner Henry Langfeld). Kalliope Musikwerke AG entered insolvency in 1914 and was liquidated in 1917; in 1919 the Anker and Kalliope brands were both taken over by Menzenhauer & Schmidt.

=== Connection to the Richter industrial empire ===
The Anker trademark used on these recordings belonged to the same Rudolstadt firm founded by Friedrich Adolf Richter that also produced the well-known Anker-Steinbaukasten (Anchor Stone building blocks) and the "Anker-Pain-Expeller" patent medicine, among other goods marketed under the anchor emblem; the Neue Deutsche Biographie confirms that from 1876 the firm's product range already extended to "music automatons, music boxes and mechanical phonograph records."

== See also ==
- Friedrich Adolf Richter
- Richter (toy company)
