= Christian Nikolaus Eberlein =

German painter

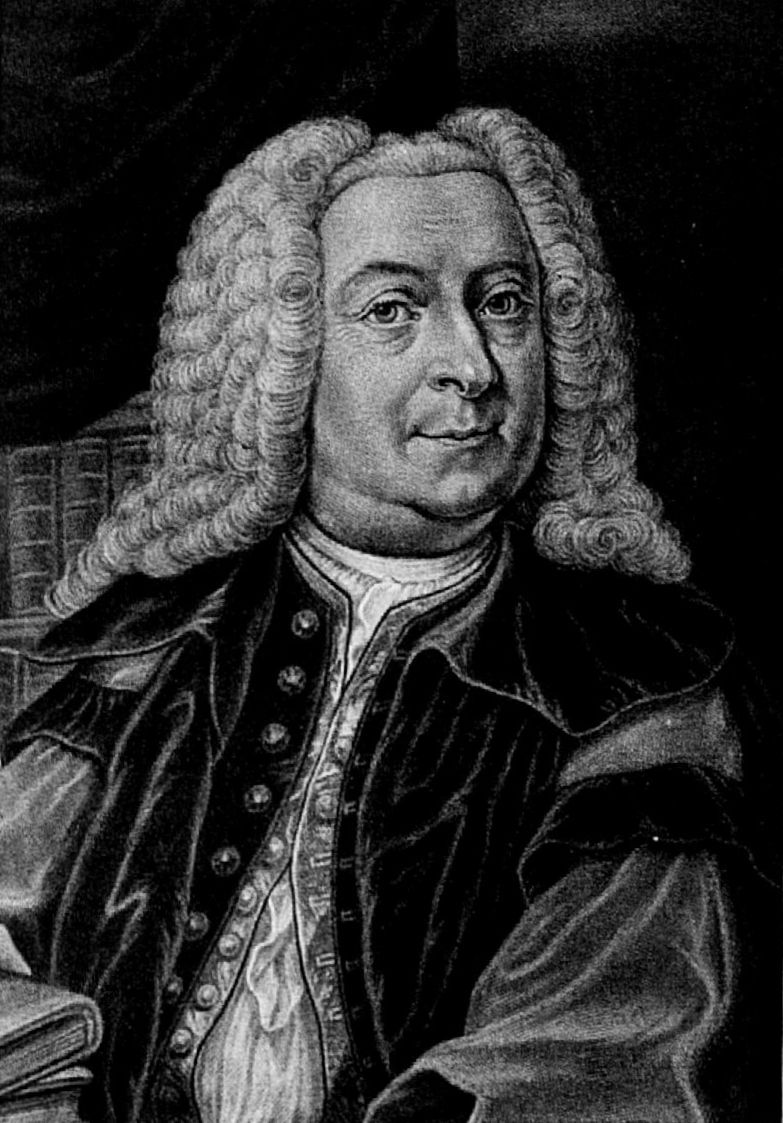
- engraving by Johann Jakob Haid after the portrait by Eberlein
- Born: 1720; Rudolstadt, Germany
- Died: 1788 (aged 67–68); Salzdahlum, Germany
- Occupation: historical painter
- Known for: inspector of Schloss Salzdahlum
- Children: Christian Eberhard Eberlein

Christian Nikolaus Eberlein (1720–1788), a German historical painter, was born at Rudolstadt in 1720. He worked in Göttingen, Wolfenbüttel, and Salzdahlum, and in 1776 became inspector of the gallery in the last-named town, and made good copies of many of the pictures therein. He died at Salzdahlum in 1788.

His son, Christian Eberhard Eberlein, who was also a painter, was born at Wolfenbüttel in 1749, and died at Göttingen in 1804.
