= Gelobet sei der Herr täglich =

Church cantata by Georg Philipp Telemann

- Church cantata by Philipp Heinrich Erlebach
- Occasion: First Sunday after Trinity
- Text: Psalm 68:20 and anon. poetry
- Language: German
- Composed: c. 1710
- Scoring: four vocal parts; strings; continuo

Gelobet sei der Herr täglich (Praised be the Lord daily) is a church cantata by Philipp Heinrich Erlebach, for four voices, strings and continuo. The first movement is based on Psalm 68:20. Erlebach structured the composition in six movements, with the last movement repeating the first. The work is extant as a manuscript from around 1710. It has been recorded and performed.

== History ==
Philipp Heinrich Erlebach composed Gelobet sei der Herr täglich in Grimma around 1710 as a church cantata for the first Sunday after Trinity. The first movement is based on Psalm 68:20, using Luther's translation of the Bible. Erlebach set the music for four vocal parts, two violins, two violas and continuo. The work is extant as a manuscript from around 1710, which is held in the collection Sammlung Fürsten- und Landesschule Grimma.

== Music ==
Erlebach structured the composition in six movements. The extended first movement is for four solo voices and all four parts are repeated at the end, after four song-like arias, one for each soloist, from the highest voice to the lowest.

The incipits are:

1. Gelobet sei der Herr täglich
2. Wie heilsam meint es doch der treue Gott
3. Das Widerspiel ist bei der bösen Zahl
4. Man trage mit Geduld des Kreuzes Last
5. Der arme Lazarus ruht sanft in Gott
6. Gelobet sei der Herr täglich

The first movement is marked Sinfonia.

== Recording and performance ==
The cantata was recorded in 1999 in a collection of four church cantatas from the period, combined with two works by Georg Benda and one by Carl Friedrich Gessel. Ludger Rémy conducted the Michaelstein Telemann Chamber Orchestra.

The cantata was performed in a cantata service at the Dreikönigskirche, Frankfurt on 18 July 2021 during the COVID-19 pandemic. The four soloists including Anne Bierwirth (alto) and Georg Poplutz (tenor) also formed the choir, with the Telemann-Ensemble conducted by Andreas Köhs.
