= Gustav Lilienthal =

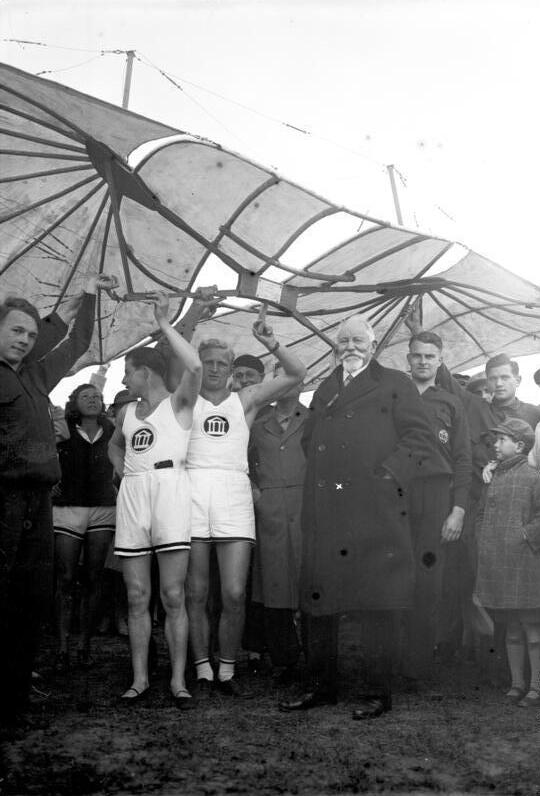
- Gustav Lilienthal and a replica of Otto’s glider (1930)
- Born: Gustav Lilienthal; 9 October 1849; Anklam, Province of Pomerania, Kingdom of Prussia, German Confederation
- Died: 1 February 1933 (aged 83); Berlin, Province of Brandenburg, Free State of Prussia, Nazi Germany
- Resting place: Parkfriedhof, Berlin-Lichterfelde
- Education: Bauakademie
- Occupations: architect, inventor, social reformer
- Known for: Successful gliding experiments; invention of Anchor Stone Blocks and Concrete block
- Relatives: Otto Lilienthal (brother)

Gustav Lilienthal (October 9, 1849 – February 1, 1933) was a German social reformer, a pioneer in building and construction technology (Prefabricated buildings), inventor of different Construction sets (e. g. Anchor Stone Blocks) and involved in the pioneering work of his brother, Otto Lilienthal in aviation.

== Bibliography ==
- Manuela Runge, Bernd Lukasch: Erfinderleben. Die Brüder Otto und Gustav Lilienthal. Berlin-Verlag, Berlin 2005, ISBN 3-8270-0536-1. (german)
