= Anchor Stone Blocks =

Stone construction toy

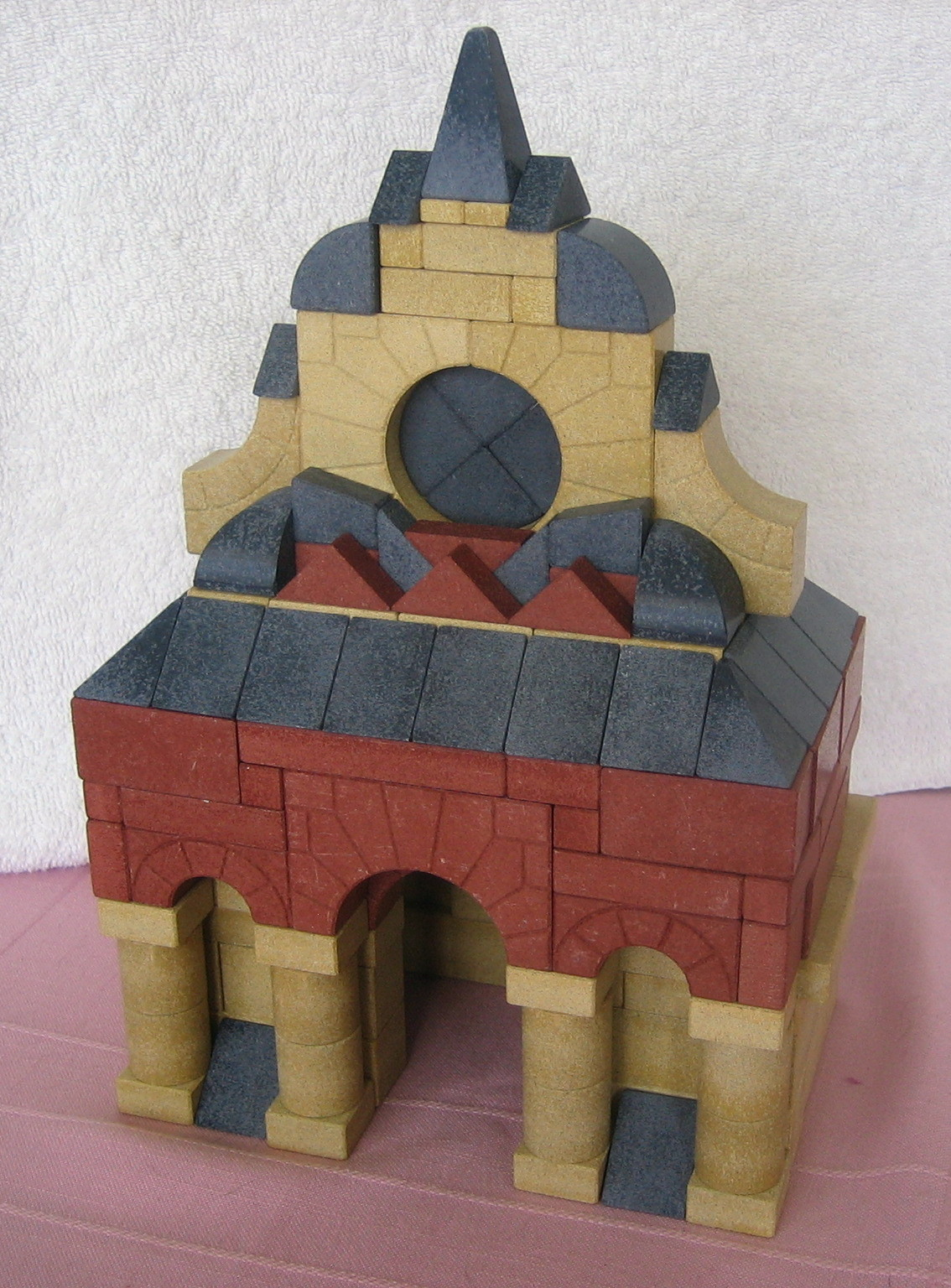
Anchor stones can be used to imitate many architectural styles, such as this Baroque palace.

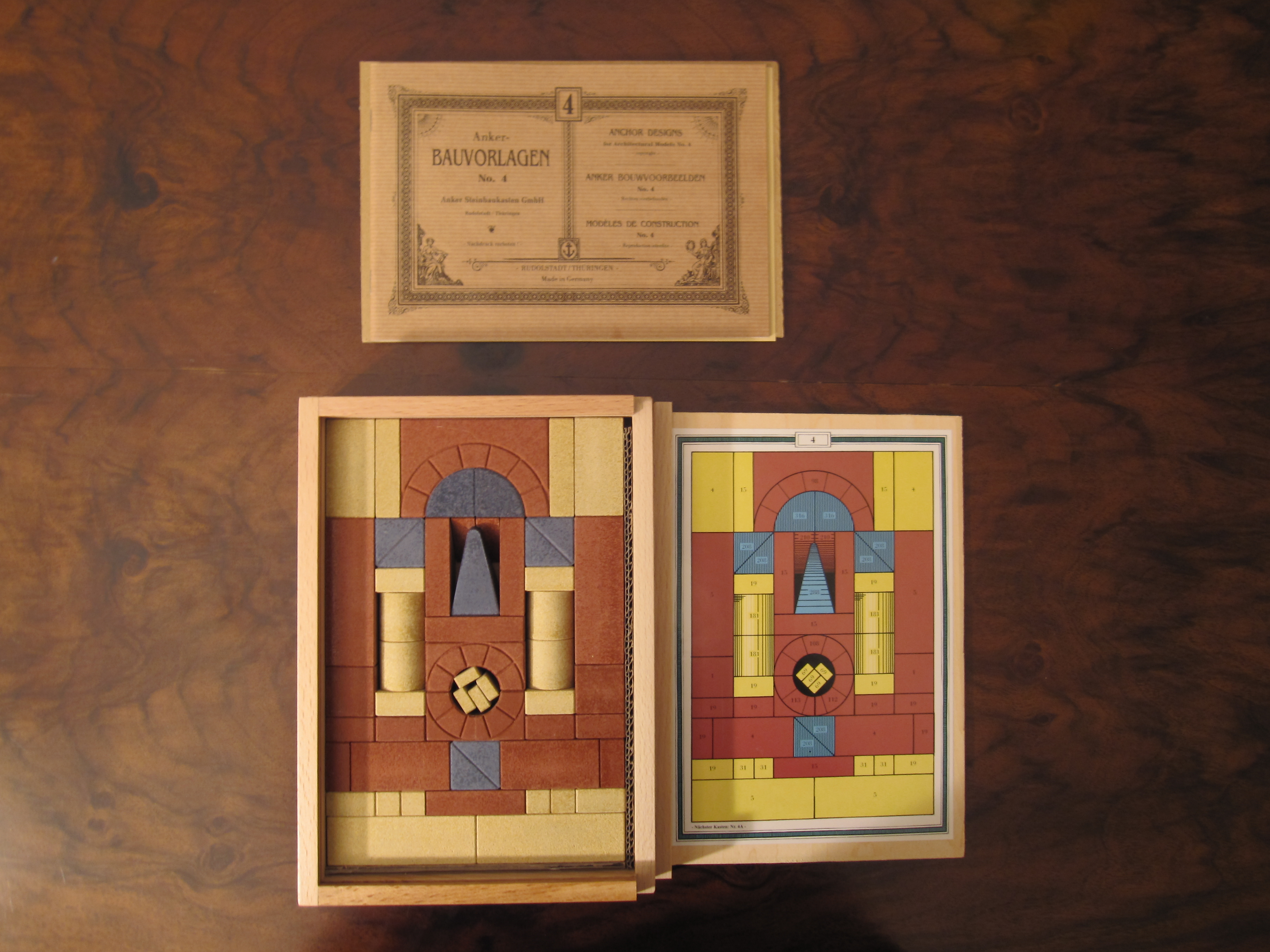
Anchor stones set #4

Anchor Stone Blocks (German: Anker-Steinbaukasten) are components of stone construction sets made in Rudolstadt, Germany, marketed as a construction toy.

== Description ==
Anchor Stone pieces are made of a mixture of quartz sand, chalk, and linseed oil (German Patent 13,770; US Patent 233,780), precisely pressed in molds so that they fit together perfectly. The stones come in three colors in imitation of the red brick, tan limestone, and blue slate of European buildings. They are not recommended for play by children under 3 years of age because of their small size (CE No. 0494).

== History ==
=== Origin ===
Anchor stones originated with the wooden building blocks designed by Friedrich Fröbel, the creator of the Kindergarten system of education. He had observed how children enjoyed playing with geometrically-shaped blocks.

The first Anchor Stone was produced when Otto Lilienthal and his brother Gustav decided to make a model of a stone building, using miniature blocks of stone in 1878. To this end, they started production of a limited number of blocks, made of a mixture of quartz sand, chalk, and linseed oil. Unfortunately, the Lilienthals, though brilliant inventors, had limited commercial success.

A cruder version of miniature stone-brick construction sets had actually been marketed earlier, in 1863, by the pedagogue Jan Daniel Georgens (1823–1886), a pupil of Fröbel; the 1878 Lilienthal recipe (silver sand, chalk and raw linseed oil, pressed into moulds and cured for several hours at 150–200 °C) was a substantial refinement of this earlier system. Through Georgens' reform-education circle, in which Gustav Lilienthal was an active collaborator, the brothers' stones were for a time marketed as "Georgens' Steinbaukasten"; a 1986 history of construction toys notes that Georgens' later willingness to claim the invention as his own casts "a doubtful light on his role as intermediary".

The stone blocks saw little popularity until 1880, when Friedrich Adolf Richter, a wealthy businessman who had built a small empire in Rudolstadt, purchased the rights to the process for 1,000 marks, plus about 4800 marks (including 800 marks still owing) for the tooling and machines being used to produce them. He developed a series of sets of individually-packaged stones, which quickly became popular. Promoted by extensive advertising, 42,000 sets were sold in 1883. In 1894, Richter applied his "Anchor" trademark to the Richter's Anchor Stone Building Sets (Richters Anker-Steinbaukasten). More than 600 different sets were produced over the multi-decade life of these sets; more than 1,000 stone shapes were made (CVA Stone Catalog). Richter died in 1910.

=== Lilienthal's later attempts and the 1887 lawsuit ===
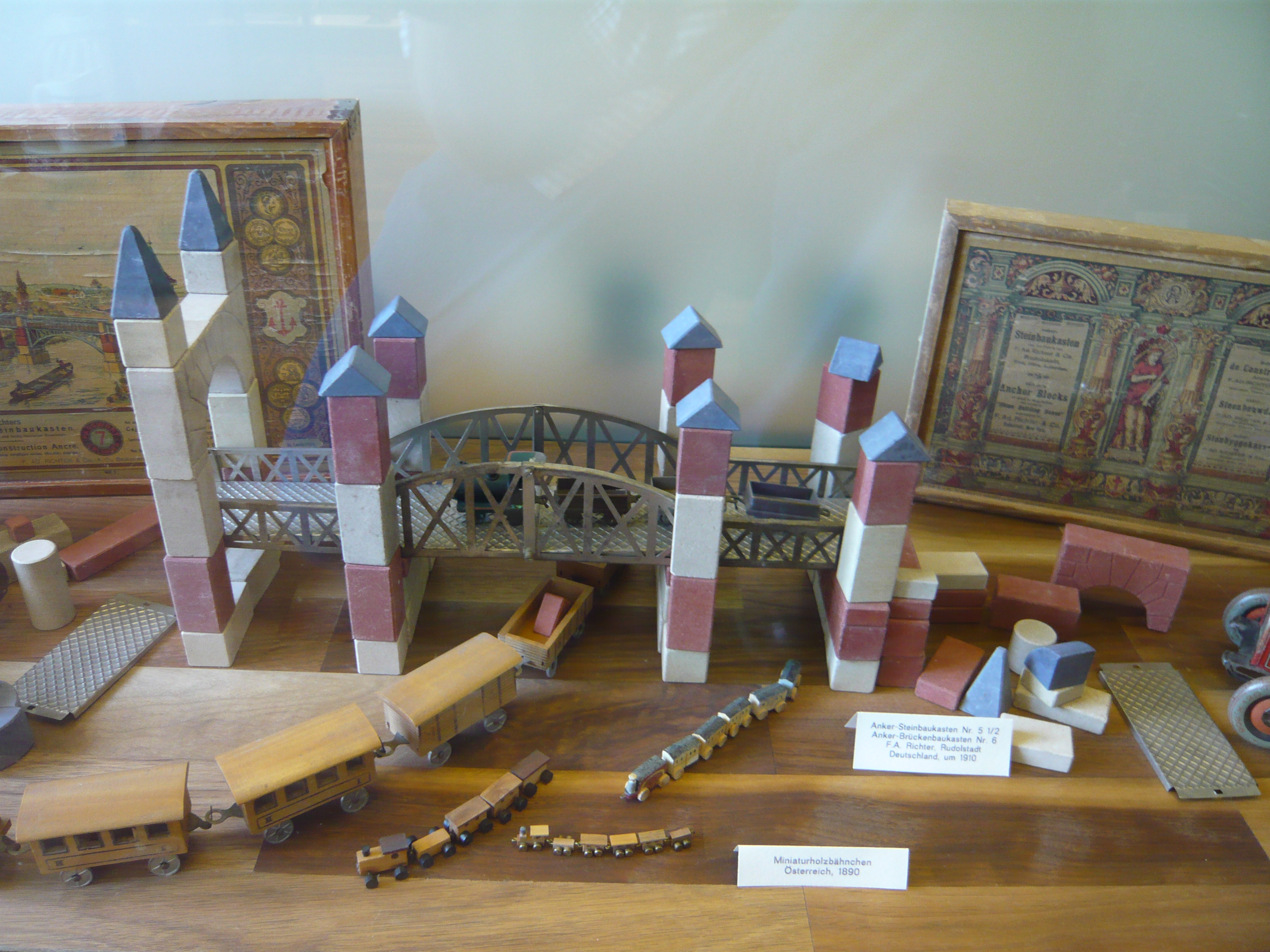
An Anchor Stone box no. 5½ and bridge-building box no. 6 made by F. A. Richter in Rudolstadt, c. 1910 (Zürich Toy Museum)

Gustav Lilienthal did not give up on the stone-building business after the 1880 sale. In 1886 he moved to France to sell his own, separately produced stones there and in England, writing detailed letters to his fiancée, Anna Rothe, about his sales strategy and the setbacks he faced, including a fire that destroyed his Paris workshop. Richter responded by suing the Lilienthal brothers in 1887 for breach of the 1880 sale contract's non-compete clause. Richter won the case in November 1887: the brothers were ordered to pay a contractual penalty of 1,000 marks, which they settled by surrendering the production equipment Gustav had built in France, and separately had to cover roughly 10,000 marks in court costs. Together with several years of expenses for trials, workshops and travel, the case wiped out Gustav's savings of about 20,000 marks and significantly affected Otto Lilienthal's finances as well. The repossessed French equipment collapsed shortly after being reassembled by one of Richter's mechanics.

A March 1887 letter from Gustav to Rothe describes his wish to fit the stone boxes with hollow, galvanised sheet-metal roofs instead of solid stone; that idea was only realised years later by Richter's company, with the nickel-plated "VE" bridge-and-roof series introduced in 1901. Richter's firm also produced its own puzzle line from 1890, beginning with a seven-piece Tangram set, followed from 1892 by the "Pythagoras" and "Quälgeist" dissection puzzles; Lilienthal's own letters suggest a similar puzzle had already been produced for him by a supplier before Richter's version reached the market.

=== End and rebirth ===
Although Anchor Stones survived World War I and World War II, the factory was included within Communist East Germany when the Iron Curtain divided Europe. In 1953, the company was nationalized as VEB Anker-Steinbaukasten, a state-owned company. In 1963, the production of the blocks was stopped. The trademark "Anker" was used by various toy companies in East Germany, none of which were related to the stone building set factory.

However, existing sets of old Anchor Stones remained very popular within the international community. In 1979, the Club van Ankervrienden ("Club of Anchor Friends") was founded in the Netherlands. Initially the membership was limited to Dutch members, but foreign members were admitted starting in 1983. As of the club's own count, the Club of Anchor Friends has about 260 members, roughly half in Germany and half mainly in the Netherlands, Austria, Switzerland and the United States, with more recent members from Belgium, France, England, Denmark and Chile. With the support of the Club of Anchor Friends, the state of Thuringia, and the European Union, Georg Plenge was able to resurrect the company as Anker Steinbaukasten GmbH. Ownership later passed to Gerhard Gollnest and Fritz-Rüdiger Kiesel, known for the wooden-toy brands goki, Heimess and Holztiger, and in 2017 to Ankerstein GmbH, a subsidiary of the Rudolstadt chapter of the Arbeiterwohlfahrt (AWO), a German welfare organisation; production is now run as a social enterprise employing people with and without disabilities. Production at the factory in Rudolstadt restarted 15 September 1994, and new sets were sold to Club members in October 1994.

== Anchor today ==
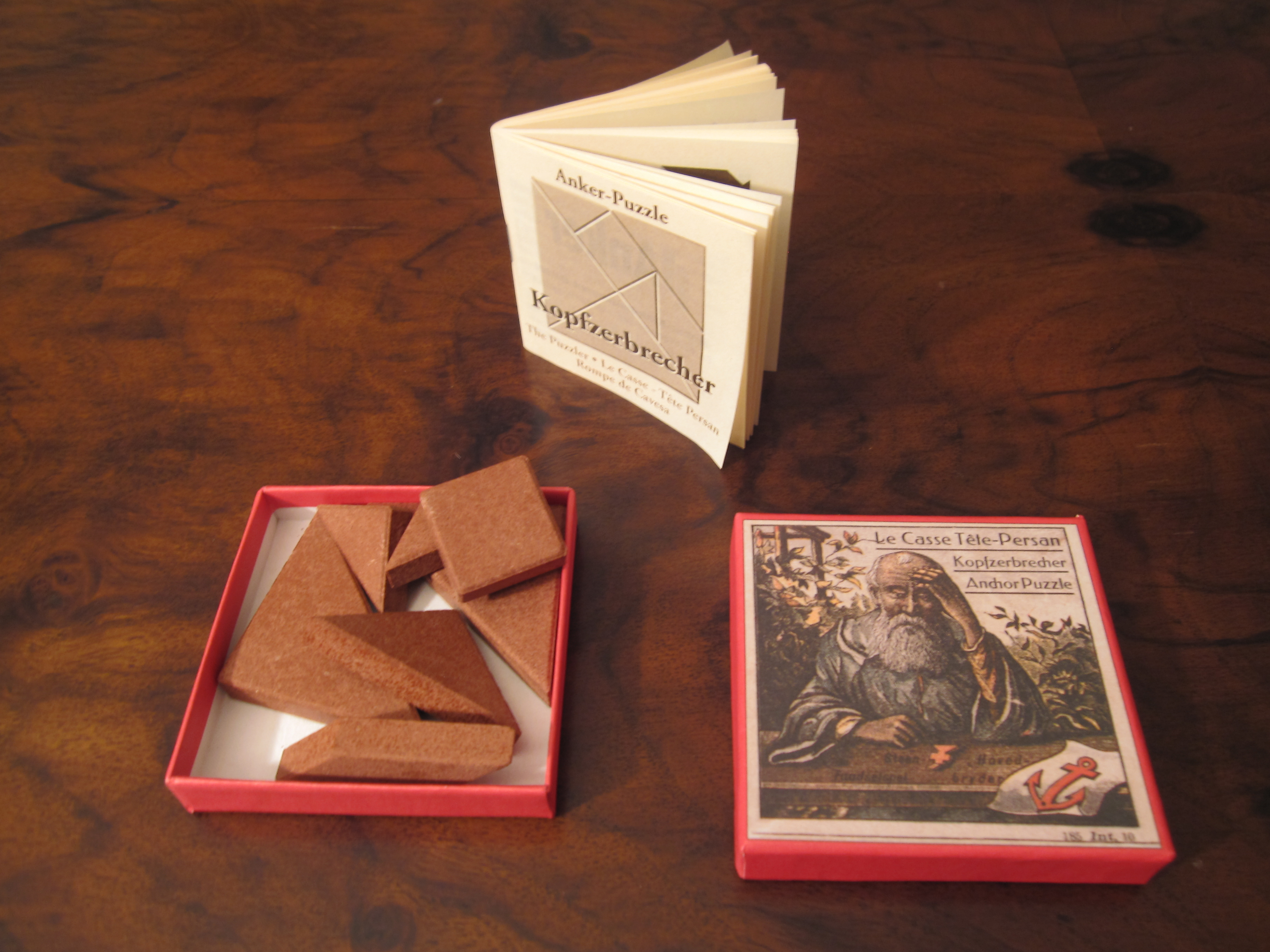
Other games by Anchor include the Kopfzerbrecher ("head breaker" or "brain teaser") puzzles

The new factory manufactures and sells all 15 of the sets in the main series (GK-NF) of Anchor sets as well as some sets modelling the Michaelis Basilika in Hildesheim and the Brandenburg Gate. They are widely available in Germany, including in the KaDeWe department store in Berlin, and are readily available online. A new series of sets for younger children called Die neue Steinzeit ("the new Stone Age") was introduced in 2012. The sets tend to be expensive, but high-quality; antique sets are just as playable now as when they were originally produced. Sets being produced today are made to the same specifications as the antique ones, so they can be easily integrated. In addition to construction sets, the artificial stone formula has been used to produce simple flat puzzles, such as tangrams.

== Cultural influences ==
Scientists, engineers, and designers like Max Born, J. Robert Oppenheimer, Albert Einstein, Ivan Sutherland and Walter Gropius developed their creativity by playing with Anchor blocks. Other noted fans have included the writers Erich Kästner and Jurek Becker and former German president Roman Herzog; U.S. president Bill Clinton once described the sets in a written message as "just wonderful". Anchor blocks have been exhibited in the Louvre and Deutsches Museum. They appear in a fairly prominent role in Jan Švankmajer's fantasy film Neco z Alenky as, among other things, the home of the White Rabbit. They also support a plot sequence in The Diamond in the Window, by Jane Langton.
