= Traugott Maximilian Eberwein =

German composer (1775–1831)

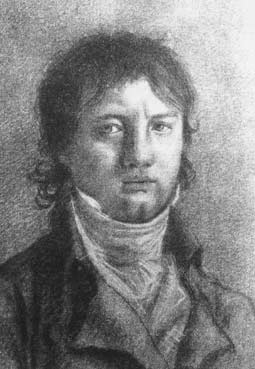
- Eberwein, c. 1803, portrait by Carl Wilhelm Ludwig Bianchi
- Born: October 27, 1775; Weimar, Germany
- Died: December 2, 1831 (aged 56); Rudolstadt, Germany
- Occupations: Composer, conductor

Traugott Maximilian Eberwein (27 October 1775 – 2 December 1831), was a German composer and conductor, who is attributed with the start of early musical history in Rudolstadt.

== Family ==
Eberwein was born into a musical family, his father Alexander Bartholomäus Eberwein (1751-1811) was a court musician and his brother Carl Eberwein was a composer who frequently worked with Johann Wolfgang von Goethe, putting his work into music such as Faust.

Eberwein had three children with his wife Catharina Bianchi, Caecilie Eberwein (1800-1800), Julius Eberwein (1802-1870) and Ludwig Eberwein (1805-1884).

== Biography ==
Eberwein was taught music at an early age by his father, where he learned all sorts of instruments and already started composing music at the age of seven with a Timpani. In 1782, he was already making money for the family by playing music at weddings and funerals. In 1791, after his father thought he gained a basic understanding of music, he stopped teaching him. He later continued getting taught by Johann Matthäus Rempt. Eberwein later went to study musicology and violin and became a pupil of F.L.Æ. Kunzen in Frankfurt, and Ernst Johann Christoph Schick in Mainz.

While visiting Johann Christian Eberwein in 1799, he gathered the attention of Louis Frederick II, Prince of Schwarzburg-Rudolstadt which led to him getting invited to his residence, to which he at first politely declined. Once he had returned back to Weimar, he met and later married Catharina Bianchi, the daughter of Andreas Giorgio Maria Bianchi, a wealthy Italian businessman. After his marriage, in 1803 he got the opportunity for a Study trip throughout Italy, where he studied under Fedele Fenaroli in Naples. After his return from the Study trip, he went to Vienna where he visited Joseph Haydn, whom he impressed after showing him some of his work. After this, he also visited other composers such as Ludwig van Beethoven and Antonio Salieri. In 1810, he went back to Vienna to visit Beethoven and Selieri where he then met Anton Reicha.

On 18 October 1831, he performed his last public opera, Das befreite Jerusalem, at the Theater Rudolstadt. He died on 2 December 1831 due to an illness.

== Works ==
=== Operas ===
- Piedro und Elvira
- Claudine von Villa Bella
- Das befreite Jerusalem
- Ferdusi
- Das goldene Netz

=== Singspiele ===
- Die hohle Eiche
- Das Storchnest
- Der Mond
- Die Fischerin
- Das Schachtournier

=== Songs ===
- Ergo bibamus (Johann Wolfgang von Goethe)
- Der Jahrmarkt zu Plundersweilen (Johann Wolfgang von Goethe)

=== Other ===
- Overture in C major
- Symphony No. 3 in E♭ major, Op. 84
- Mass in A♭ major, Op. 87
