= Philipp Heinrich Erlebach =

German composer (1657–1714)

Philipp Heinrich Erlebach (25 July 1657 – 17 April 1714) was a German Baroque composer, a prolific writer of church music and secular music. Much of his work is lost due to a fire.

== Life ==
Erlebach was born in Esens, Lower Saxony, the son of Johann Philipp Erlebach, a musician at the court of Count Ulrich II of East Frisia (1605–1648), the principality where the younger Erlebach received his early musical training.

Based on his musical abilities, Erlebach was lent to the court of Prince Albrecht Anton of Schwarzburg-Rudolstadt (1641–1710), count of the larger principality of Thuringia, in 1678. In 1681, he was appointed to the post of Kapellmeister to the Thuringian Court, a position he held for 33 years, until his death, aged 56, in Rudolstadt.

== Works ==
Erlebach's compositions include orchestral and chamber music, operas, cantatas, masses and oratorios. He was a prolific composer, but most of his works (over 1000 compositions), which had been acquired by the court from Erlebach's widow after his death, were destroyed in 1735 during a fire in Rudolstadt. This caused Erlebach's music to be almost completely forgotten. Only 90 compositions (about 9 percent of his working output) survived, some in manuscript form. Much of his posterity is dependent upon published editions of his works.

About 70 of his church cantatas are extant, such as Gelobet sei der Herr täglich, out of a total of more than 400. The destroyed material also included 24 masses and at least six complete cycles of cantatas for the Lutheran church year. Erlebach also composed secular vocal music and songs, included in a 1697 published collection titled Harmonische Freude musicalischer Freunde (Harmonic delight of musical friends), which contains over 75 such pieces. From the more than 120 instrumental works Erlebach is known to have produced, only 13 pieces survive.

== Surviving works ==
- VI Ouvertures begleitet mit … Airs nach französischer Art, a 5, 6, 1693
- Six sonatas for violin, viola da gamba and continuo, 1694
- March from Musicalia bei dem Actu homagiali Mulhusino
- Harmonische Freude musicalischer Freunde, 1697, 1710
  - vol. 1: 50 arias
  - vol. 2: 25 arias
- Josephs neuer Kaiserthron, serenade from Musicalia bei dem Actu homagiali Mulhusino, 1705
- 19 other arias
