= Rudolstadt =

Town in Thuringia, Germany

- Town
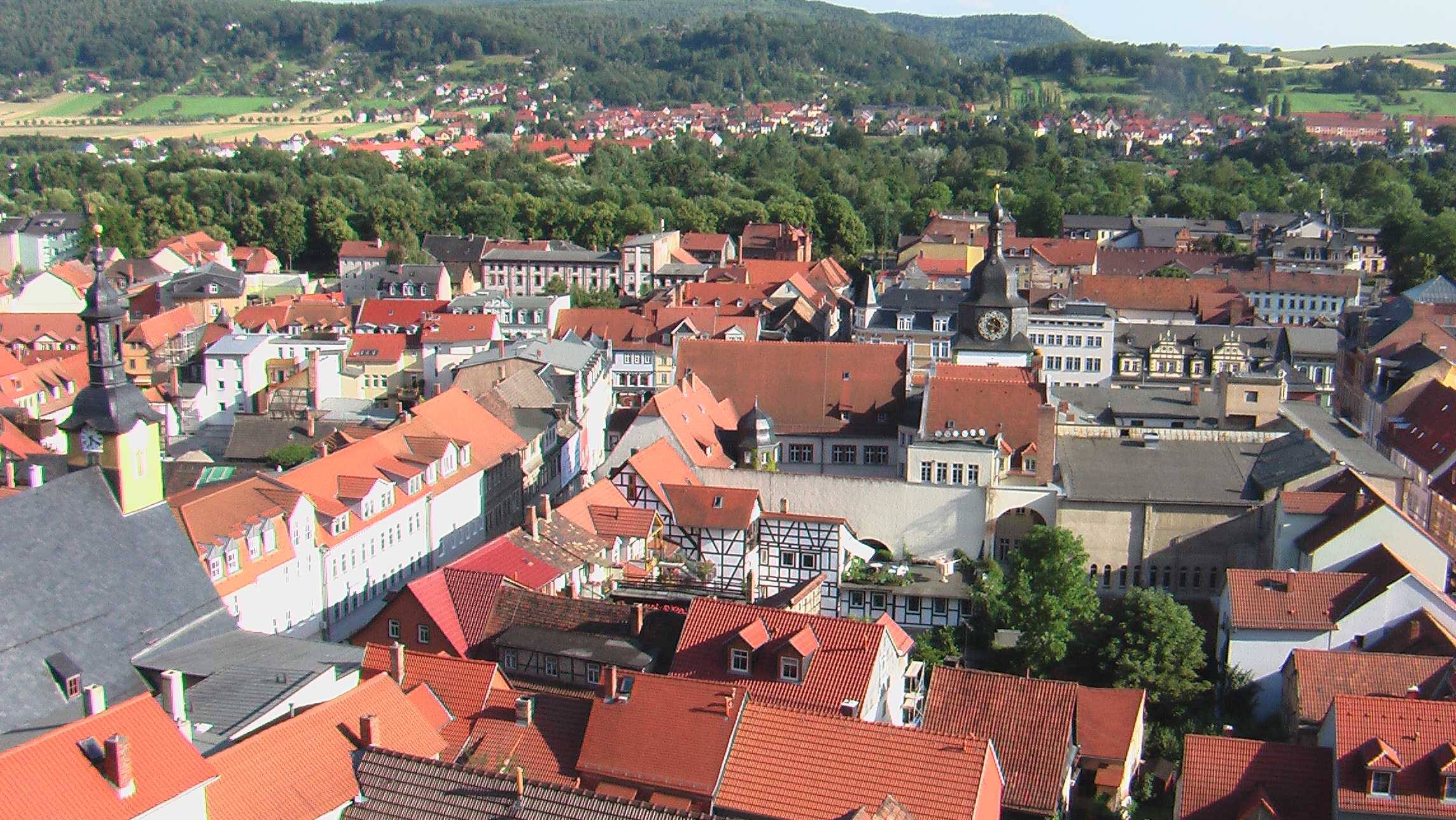

- Coat of arms

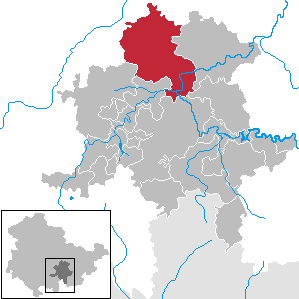
- Location of Rudolstadt within Saalfeld-Rudolstadt district
- Interactive map of Rudolstadt
- Location within Germany Location within Thuringia
- Coordinates: 50°43′1″N 11°19′39″E
- Country: Germany
- State: Thuringia
- District: Saalfeld-Rudolstadt
- Subdivisions: 12

Government
  - Mayor (2024–30): Jörg Reichl

Area
  - Total: 135.18 km^{2} (52.19 sq mi)
- Elevation: 195 m (640 ft)

Population (2025-12-31)
  - Total: 24,852
  - Density: 183.84/km^{2} (476.15/sq mi)
- Time zone: UTC+01:00 (CET)
  - Summer (DST): UTC+02:00 (CEST)
- Postal codes: 07407
- Dialling codes: 03672
- Vehicle registration: SLF, RU
- Website: www.rudolstadt.de

Rudolstadt (German pronunciation: [ˈʁuːdɔlˌʃtat]) is a town in the German federal state Thuringia, within the Thuringian Forest, to the southwest, and to Jena and Weimar to the north.

The former capital of Schwarzburg-Rudolstadt, the town is built along the River Saale inside a wide valley surrounded by woods. Rudolstadt was founded in 776 and has had municipal law since 1326. The town's landmark is the Castle Heidecksburg which is enthroned on a hill above the old town. The former municipality Remda-Teichel was merged into Rudolstadt in January 2019.

Rudolstadt was once well known because of the Anchor Stone Blocks of the Toy Company Richter and porcelain factories, beginning with the establishment of the Volkstedt porcelain manufacture in 1762.

== History ==
=== Early history ===
There is archeological evidence of a hill fort on the Weinberg in Oberpreilipp from the time of the late Urnfield culture and the early Iron Age. A Celtic settlement followed the Germanic one and the affiliation with the Duchy of Thuringia. From the 6th century onwards, archeological records suggest Slavic settlement in the area.

The first documented mention of the place-name was in 776 as Rudolfestat (Rudolf's settlement) as a gift from Charlemagne to Hersfeld Abbey

=== After 1990 ===
In 1994 the Neonazi and police-informant Tino Brandt (NPD) founded the Neonazi-Gang „Thüringer Heimatschutz“ (THS, Thuringian homeland protection) in Rudolstadt. The structure of 170 right-wing extremists was an SA-style street gang. The THS gave rise to the Nazi terrorist group National Socialist Underground (NSU), which murdered a total of ten people over a period of 10 years.

=== Historical population ===
Population graph of Rudolstadt from 1834 to 2016

Number of Inhabitants (from 1960 as of 31 December, unless otherwise indicated):

1834 to 1960

- 1834: 5,929
- 1890: 11,398
- 1925: 15,711
- 1933: 16,863
- 1939: 19,331
- 1946: 22,100 ^{1}
- 1950: 28,234 ^{2}
- 1960: 27,678

1970 to 1997

- 1970: 31,683
- 1981: 31,547
- 1984: 32,232
- 1985: 32,408
- 1994: 29,118
- 1995: 28,691
- 1996: 28,438
- 1997: 28,521

1998 to 2005

- 1998: 28,241
- 1999: 27,996
- 2000: 27,528
- 2001: 26,940
- 2002: 26,549
- 2003: 26,010
- 2004: 25,793
- 2005: 25,397

2006 to 2013

- 2006: 25,131
- 2007: 24,650
- 2008: 24,285
- 2009: 24,033
- 2010: 23,762
- 2011: 23,998
- 2012: 22,811
- 2013: 22,739

since 2014

- 2014: 22,667
- 2015: 22,855
- 2016: 22,704
- 2017: 22,560
- 2018: 22,283

Data since 1994: Thuringian Statistical Office

^{1} 29 October
^{2} 31 August

== Culture ==
Rudolstadt is twinned with Letterkenny, County Donegal, Ireland.

The Rudolstadt Festival (formerly TFF, Tanz&FolkFest) takes place annually on the first full July weekend.

Rudolstadt is also home to the Thüringer Landestheater Rudolstadt, whose origins go back to a court theatre built in 1792/93. The theatre company and the Thüringer Symphoniker Saalfeld-Rudolstadt are operated by the Thüringer Landestheater Rudolstadt und Thüringer Symphoniker Saalfeld-Rudolstadt GmbH, which maintains both a spoken theatre ensemble and the orchestra.

== Economy ==
The headquarters of the EPC Group, a global engineering and construction company, are in Rudolstadt.

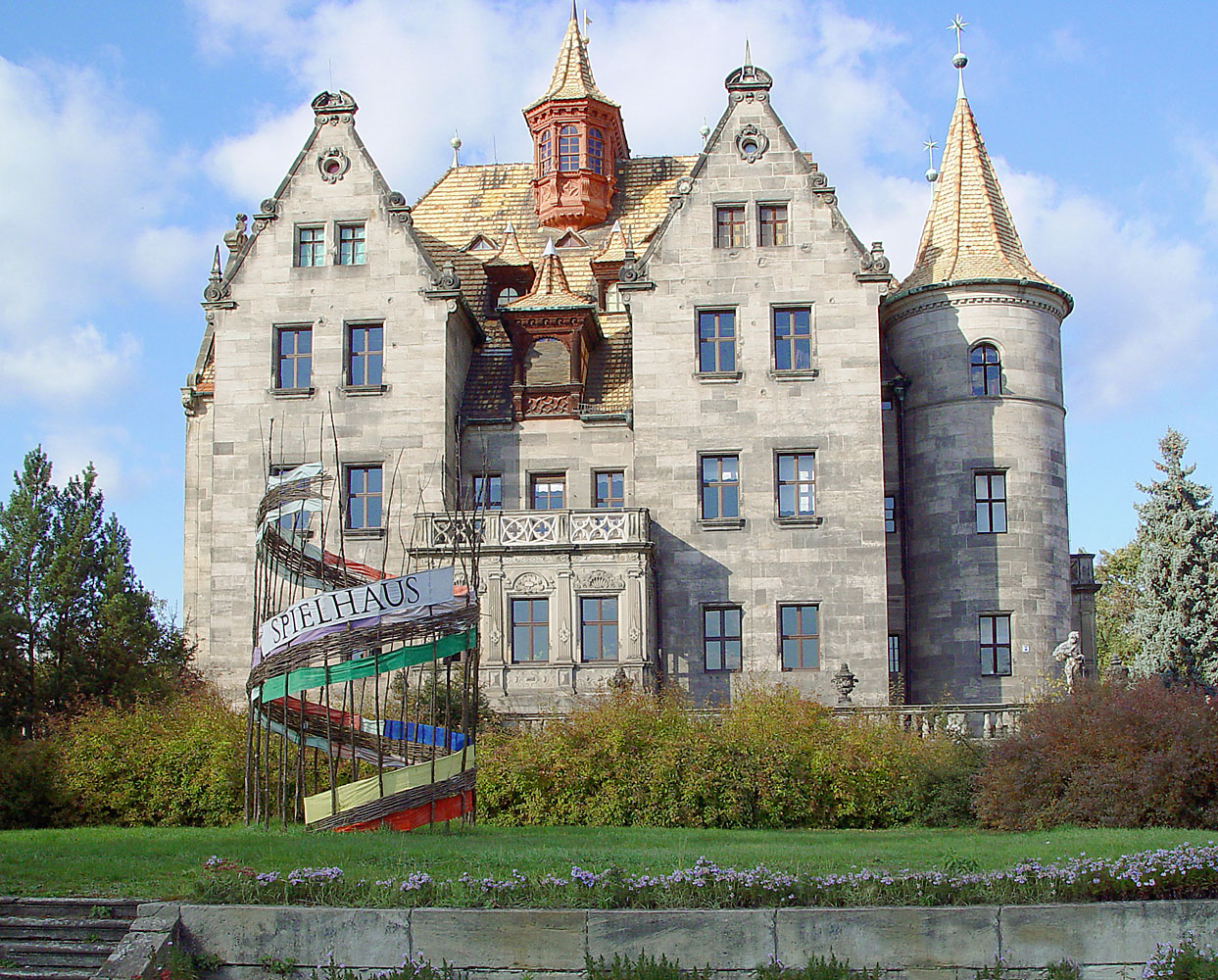
The so-called "Richtersche Villa" (Richters Mansion).

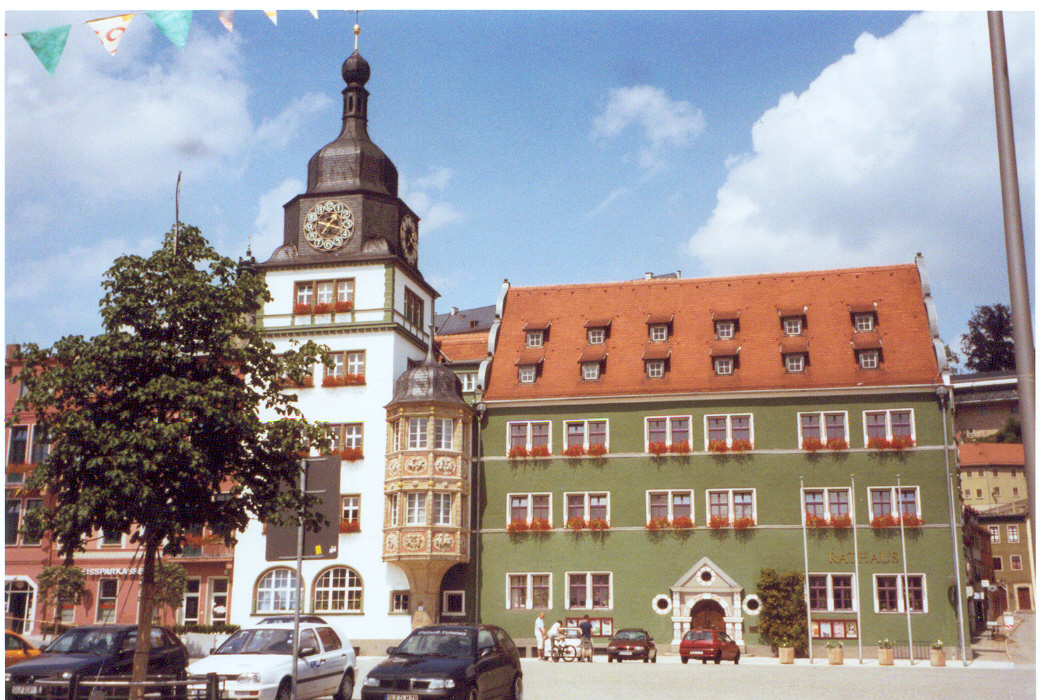
Rudolstadt Town Hall

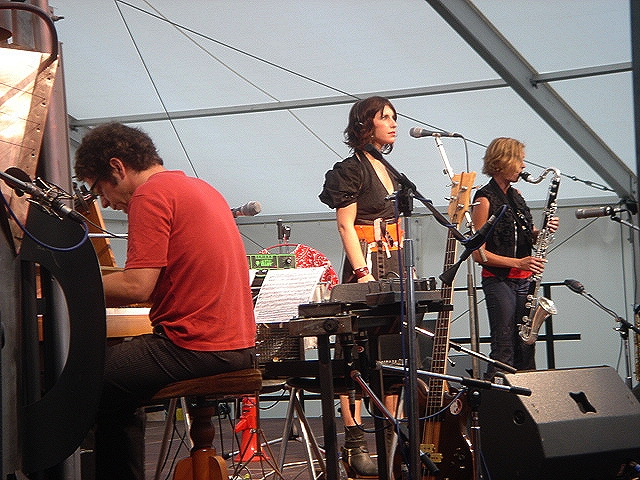
Bobo 2006

Chemical Industry of East Germany
- Arthur Schopenhauer wrote his dissertation in Rudolstadt.
- Princess Anna Sophie of Schwarzburg-Rudolstadt, grandmother of King Leopold I of Belgium, great-grandmother to Albert, Prince Consort of the United Kingdom
- Tino Brandt (NPD), German Neonazi founded Thüringer Heimatschutz in 1994 in Rudolstadt
- Christian Nikolaus Eberlein (1720–1788), historical painter
- Traugott Maximilian Eberwein, German composer, worked here as the composer in residence for the Rudolstadt theatre
- Philipp Heinrich Erlebach, German composer and choirmaster in Rudolstadt
- Hans Fallada, German writer. He went to school in Rudolstadt, it was here that he killed his friend Hans Dietrich von Necker in a duel
- Ahasverus Fritsch, German poet and composer
- Simone Lange, German politician (SPD)
- Franz Liszt, Hungarian composer worked here as the composer in residence for the Rudolstadt theatre
- Niccolò Paganini, Italian composer, worked here as the composer in residence for the Rudolstadt theatre
- Max Wandrer, Olympic gymnast, was born in Rudolstadt
- Charlotte von Lengefeld (1766–1826), wife of Schiller
- Richard Wagner, German composer, worked here as the composer in residence for the Rudolstadt theatre
