= WGE =

WGE may refer to:

== Places ==
- Walgett Airport (IATA airport code: WGE), Walgett, New South Wales, Australia
- Widukind-Gymnasium Enger, Enger, Herford, Northrhine-Westphalia, Germany; a school
- William Greenleaf Eliot College, Washington University in St. Louis, Missouri, USA; a residential college; see Campus life at Washington University in St. Louis

== Groups, organizations, companies ==
- WGE Gang, a street gang from New Orleans
- Working Group on Environment, Greater Mekong Subregion Environment Operations Center

== Other uses ==
- World Gasoline Engine, an automotive engine from the Global Engine Alliance (GEMA), an alliance of automotive companies
- Wheat germ extract, a type of cell extract used for cell-free protein synthesis

== See also ==
- wage (disambiguation)
