= Widukind-Gymnasium Enger =

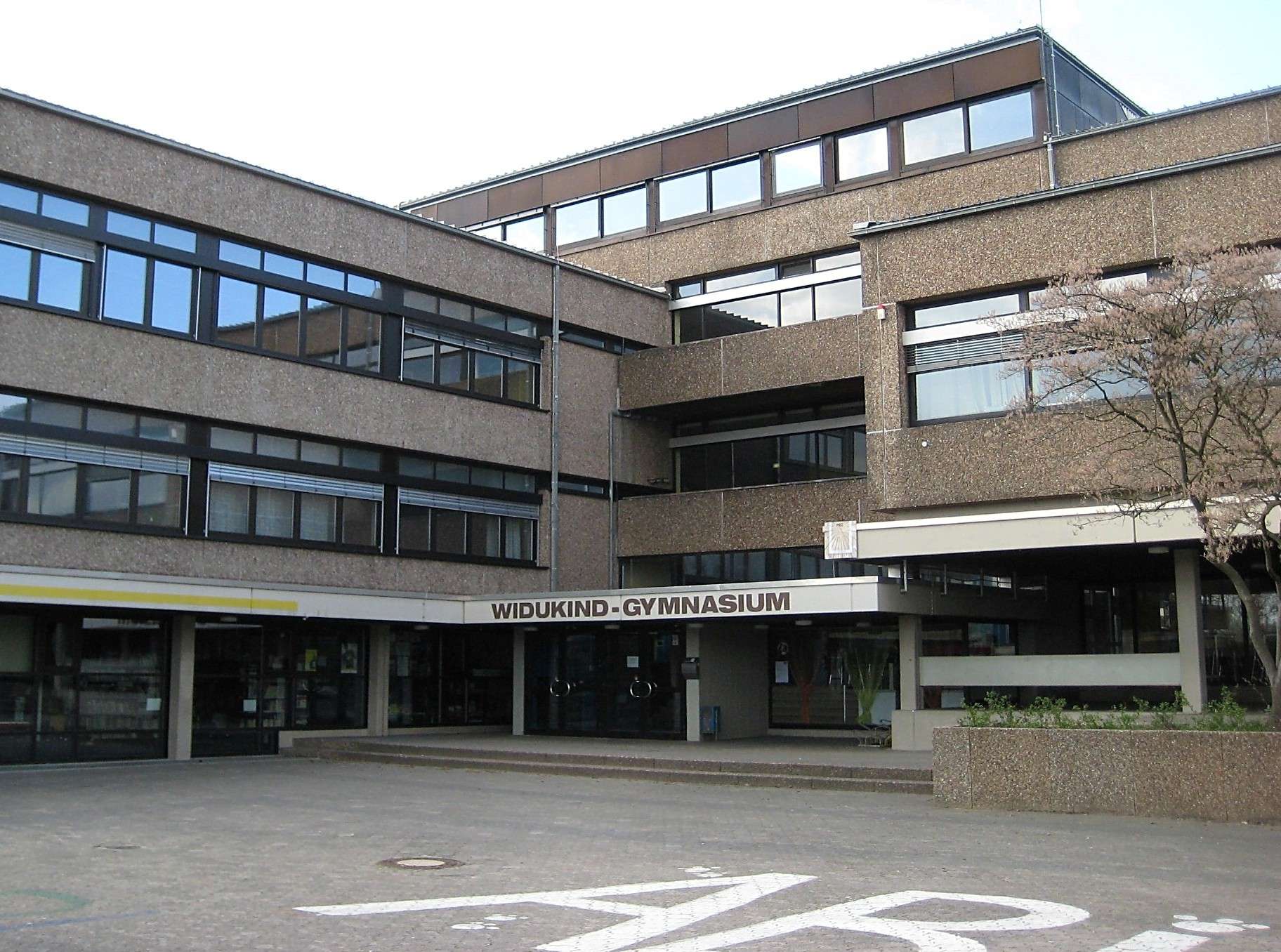
- Main entrance of the building

Location
- Tiefenbruchstraße 22; 31230 Enger; Kreis Herford; Germany; 52.1415°N 8.5489°E

Information
- Type: Gymnasium
- Principal: Ulrich Henselmeyer
- Faculty: c. 100 teachers
- Grades: 5-12
- Gender: Male and female
- Age: 9 to 18
- Enrollment: 1027 (2023-2024)
- Classes: c. 30
- Language: German (main language); English (foreign language); French, Spanish, or Latin as second foreign language
- Hours in school day: 5:15 (7:55-13:10), Unter-, Mittel- & Oberstufe, Tue., Fri.; 7:35 (7:55-15:30), Unter- & Mittelstufe, Mon., Wed., Thu.; 9:10 (7:55-17:05), Oberstufe, Mon., Wed., Thu.
- Campuses: Schulhof (German for school court, in front of the school building); Schulgarten (German for school garden, beside the school building (See more); Schulgarten am Bio-Teich (German for school garden at the Biological Pond, on the other side of the school building than the Schulgarten)
- Campus type: Natural
- Houses: Altbau; Neubau; Mittelbau; Große Turnhalle; Kleine Turnhalle; Aula
- Sports: Soccer; Tabletennis; Badminton; Tennis
- Communities served: Enger; Spenge; Westerenger; Bünde; Herford
- Secretariat: Katharina Wiedmer; Demet Matzir
- Website: wg-enger.de
- Last updated: August 28, 2023

The Widukind-Gymnasium Enger (vidʊkɪnd-gYmnaʰsium əŋər) is a gymnasium located on Tiefenbruchstraße 22, Enger, Herford, Northrhine-Westphalia. It is named after the Saxon leader Widukind, who is also buried in Enger. There are over one thousand enrolled students and more than 100 teachers in the school.

== Campus ==
=== School grounds ===
The WGE campus is kept as natural as possible. The Schulgarten for example is a big lawn surrounded by many green trees. There are also three soccer fields in the Schulgarten, and the members of the Neigungsfach Gartenarbeit are keeping plants on a garden with greenhouses for their studies. On the right of the soccer fields (as seen from the building) goes a long grassy path beside a field, with a wooden table at the other end. There is also a long connection of paths in the woods around the soccer fields.

At the main entrance is a big outdoor place (called the Schulhof) where many students hang out in the breaks. In the building near the main entrance is the mensa and the Mediothek. The secretariat and teacher's room are also near the main entrance. On the far side of the entrance are the two gyms. The bigger gym can be divided in 1:2 and holds a soccer field and a basketball court.

=== Buildings ===
The gymnasium's main building is largely composed of the Altbau, built in the 1970s. Then there is the Neubau, which is much smaller, at the end of the building. It was built in the 2000s. The Unterstufe (Grades 5-7) are studying in the Neubau.

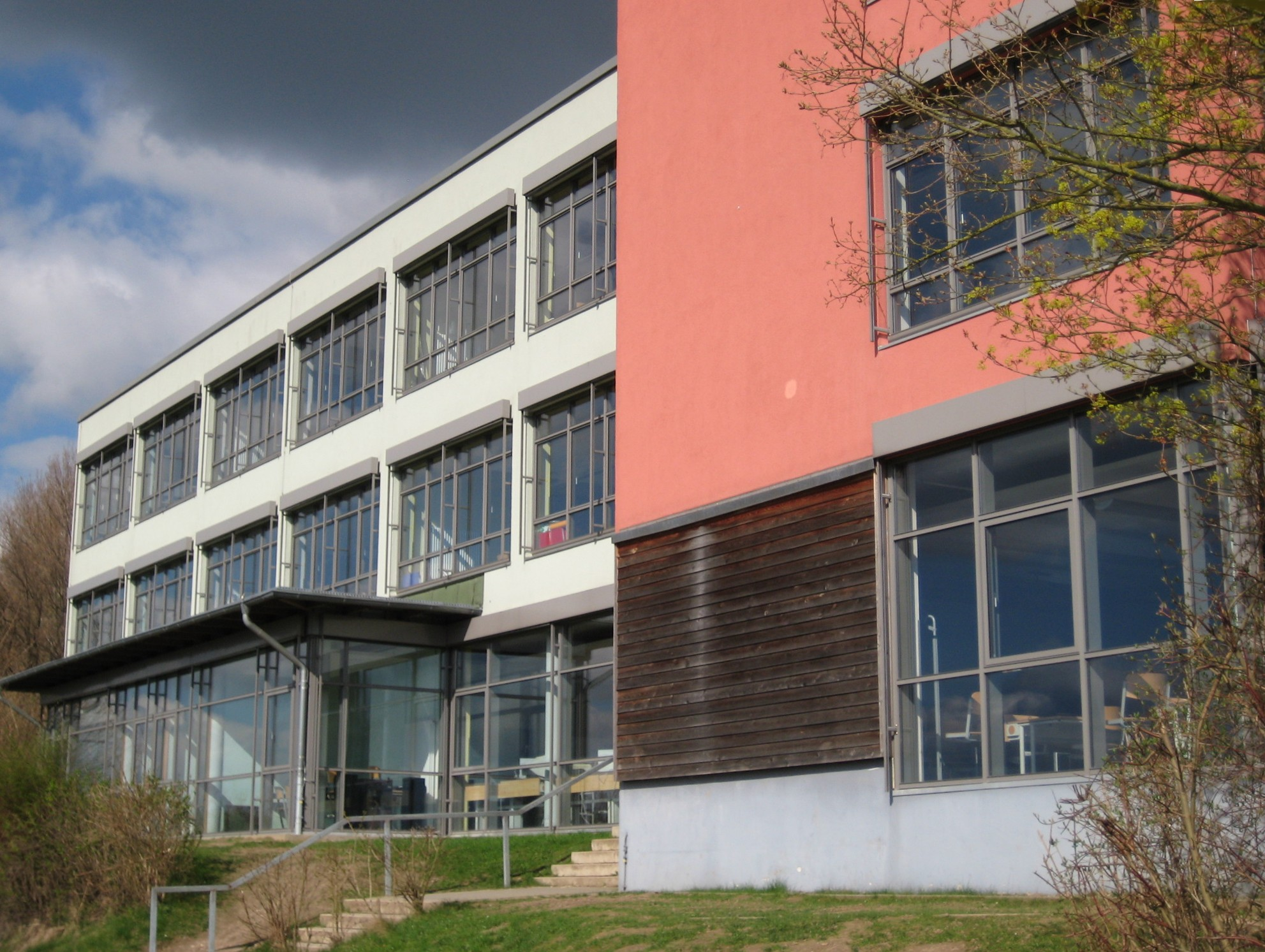
The Neubau.

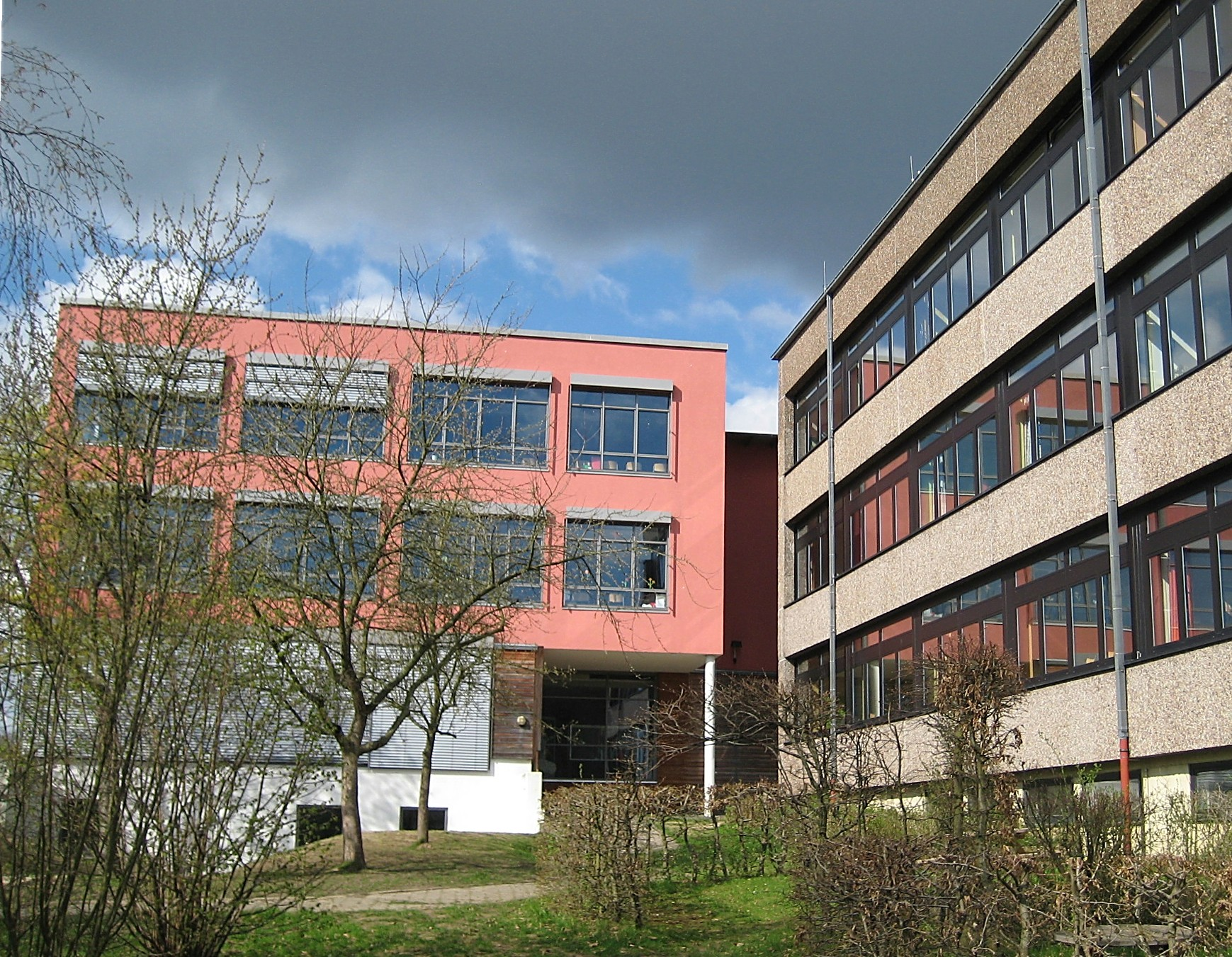
The connecting point between the Altbau (right) and Neubau (left).

== Projects ==
This is a list of the WGE's projects:

•Ägypten-Projekt (Egypt Project)

The sixth graders tour to Hanover for two days and visit an Egyptian museum where they collect information. This will have a huge effect if they will do it in the Gymnasium's 7th grade or have to move to a Realschule.

•Sport-teams

The school also has its own teams for soccer, table tennis, badminton, etc.

•Internet-soap opera: Voll krass - das Leben (So Cool - Life)

•Rumpelstilzchen Literaturprojekt (Rumpelstiltskin Literature Competition)

•Choir, Orchester, and Jazz-Rock band

== Schoolday ==
=== Start of the day ===
The schoolday at the WGE starts at 7:55 a.m., but the students can already entry their classrooms ten minutes earlier. There are school buses that deliver the students to the school until 7:50. This school buses are operated by bus companies like Kuhlmann and the Stadtbus of Enger.

Then the first hour (45 min.) starts. At 8:40, with the end of the first hour, a five-minute break begins, in which the students stay in the classrooms. After the short break another single hour starts, either another subject then the first one or a continuation of it.

Afterwards, a twenty-minute break begins, in which the students must go outdoor. In this break the students play soccer, table tennis, or basketball. Some also eat some brought food or buy something (bratwurst, pretzel, pizza, etc.) at the kiosk.

This is followed by a Doppelstunde (German for "Double hour"), a twenty-minute break and a following Doppelstunde again.

=== Noon break ===
Since 2009, the WGE extended the classes on Monday, Wednesday, md Thursday until 15:30. The other two days end at 13:10.

On the three days until 15:30, the students have a noon break from 13:10 to 14:00. The students may stay in the building, but can also go outside to play or do anything. However, they are not allowed to leave the school campus. An exception of this rule are the students of the Oberstufe (grades 10+).

The mensa is also opened for getting and eating the ordered meals in the time period 13:10 to 13:45.

=== Afternoon class ===
On the days Monday, Wednesday, Thursday, the schoolday is extended until 17:35. There are no breaks between this two school hours.

==== Neigungsfach and Profilfach ====
The Neigungsfach/Profilfach is a subject of choice which is performed on the Wednesday afternoon class (13:50-15:30). These subjects are:

•Neigungsfächer (classes 5-7)

- Tennis
- Historic fighting
- Swimming
- Art
- Walking
- Modeling
- Theatre
- Chess
- Dancing
- Versuchskaninchen 5
- Versuchskaninchen 6
- Handball
- Choir
- Sport
- Gardening
- Sculpturing
- Sewing
- History
- Building marionettes
- Speedstacking
- Writing
- Instrument-blowing

•Profilfächer (classes 8-9)

- Theater
- Spanish
- Latin
- Philosophy
- Camera
- Football
- Biotechnology
- English
- Volleyball
- Cooking
- Writing
- Pedagogy

==== Extended afternoon class ====
The Oberstufe (classes 10-12) has also sometimes classes until 17:05, with a short break from 15:30 to 15:35.

== Notable alumni ==
- Susanne Ihsen, professor at the Technical University of Munich
- Markus Rathey, professor at the Yale University
- Karl-Heinz Wiesemann, Bishop of Speyer, Germany
- Frank Sorgatz and Bernd Gössling, members of Forever Young)
- Marcel Stadel, player of TuS Dassendorf)
- Frederik Gößling, trainer of SpVgg Greuther Fürth
