= Exter (Vlotho) =

Area of Vlotho in Germany

- Ortsteil of Vlotho
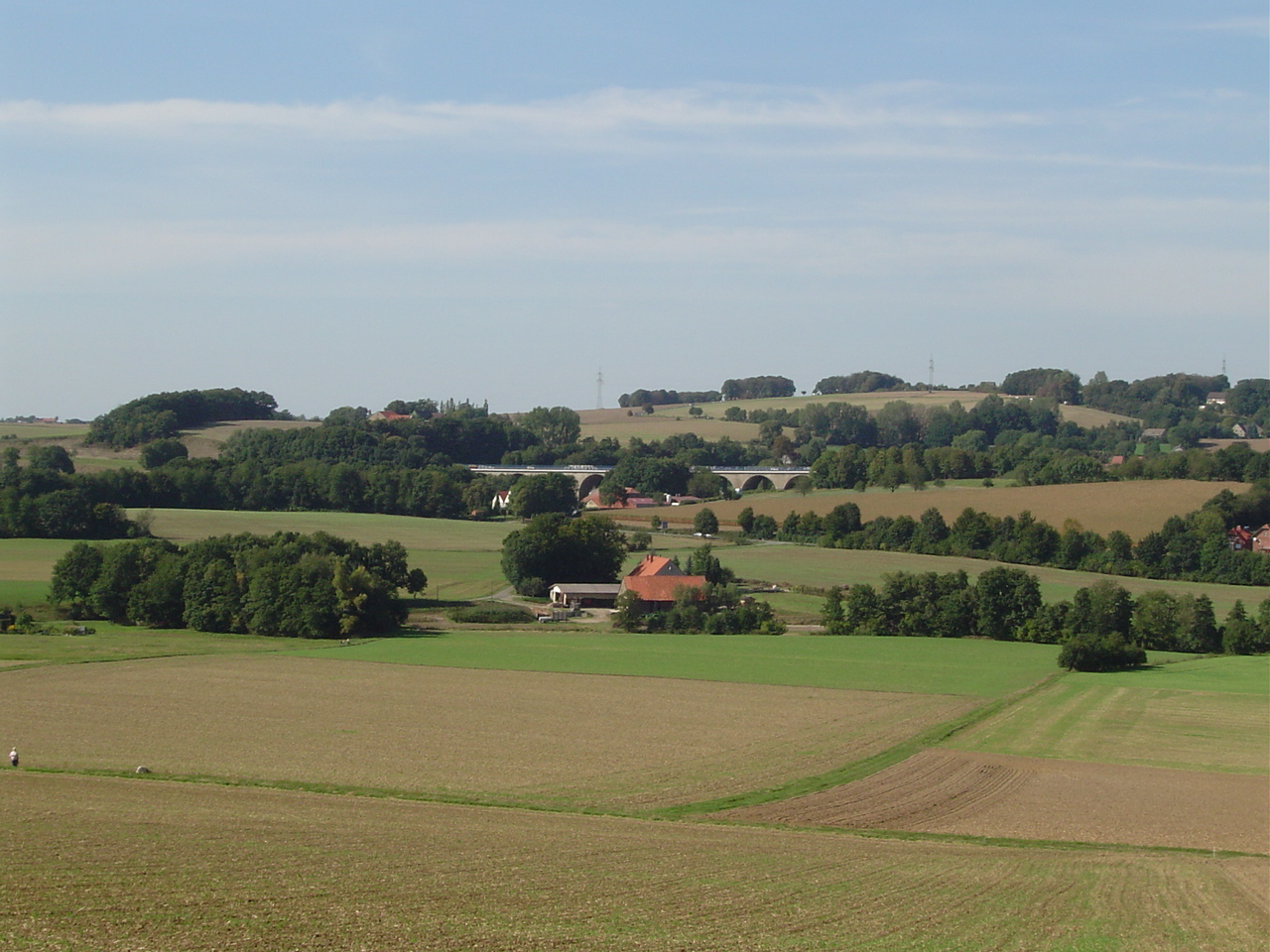
- Rural scene with highway bridge in background

- Districts of Vlotho
- Interactive map of Exter
- Location within Germany Location within North Rhine-Westphalia
- Coordinates: 52°08′16″N 08°46′48″E
- Country: Germany
- State: North Rhine-Westphalia
- Admin. region: Detmold
- District: Herford
- Town: Vlotho
- Elevation: 99 m (325 ft)

Population (2018-12-31)
  - Total: 2,788
- Time zone: UTC+01:00 (CET)
  - Summer (DST): UTC+02:00 (CEST)
- Postal codes: 32602
- Dialling codes: 05228

Exter ([ˈɛkstɐ]) is a suburb of the town Vlotho in the district of Herford, in North Rhine-Westphalia, Germany. Exter has a population of just over 3,000 (June 2007) and makes up the westernmost part of the town Vlotho.

== Location ==
Exter borders on Herford in the west, Löhne and Bad Oeynhausen (both Minden-Lübbecke district) in the north, the suburb Valdorf of Vlotho in the east, and Bad Salzuflen (Lippe district) in the south. Bundesautobahn 2 goes through the village.

The highest point is the Steinegge at 255.5 m, the lowest point is at Hagenmühle at 99.6 m.

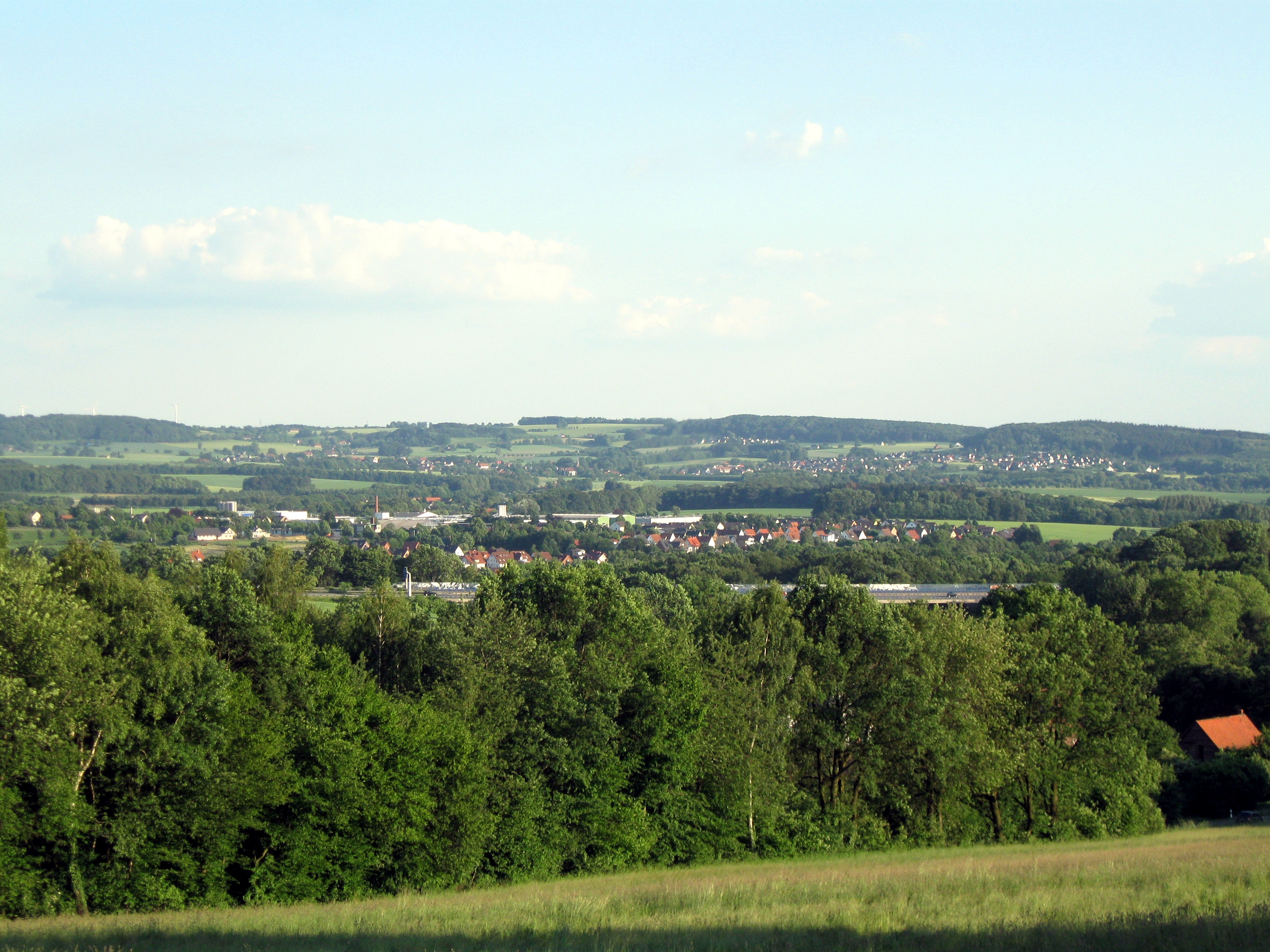
View of Exter from the north – with Wüsten (Lippe) in the background

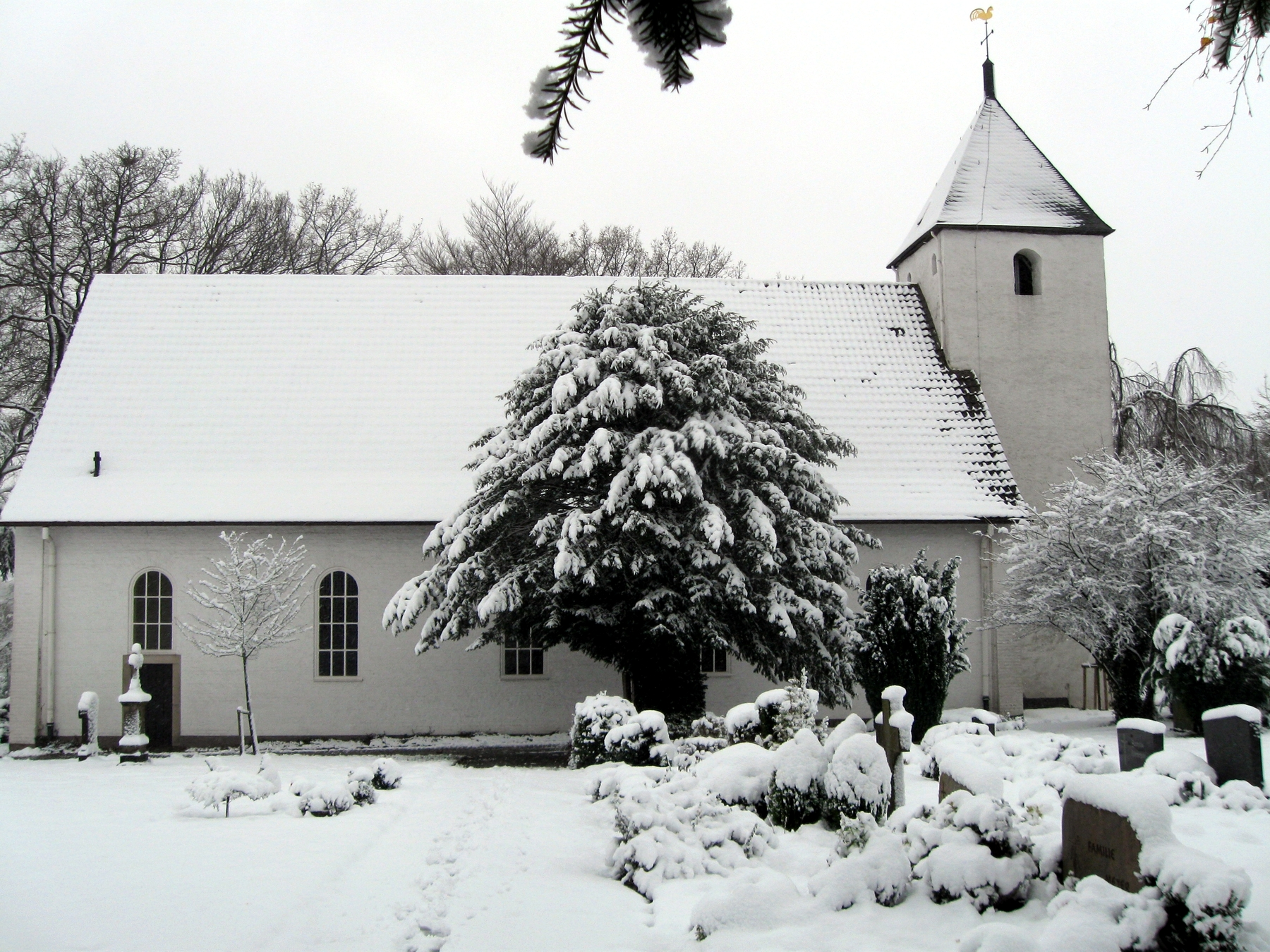
Germany's first Lutheran highway church

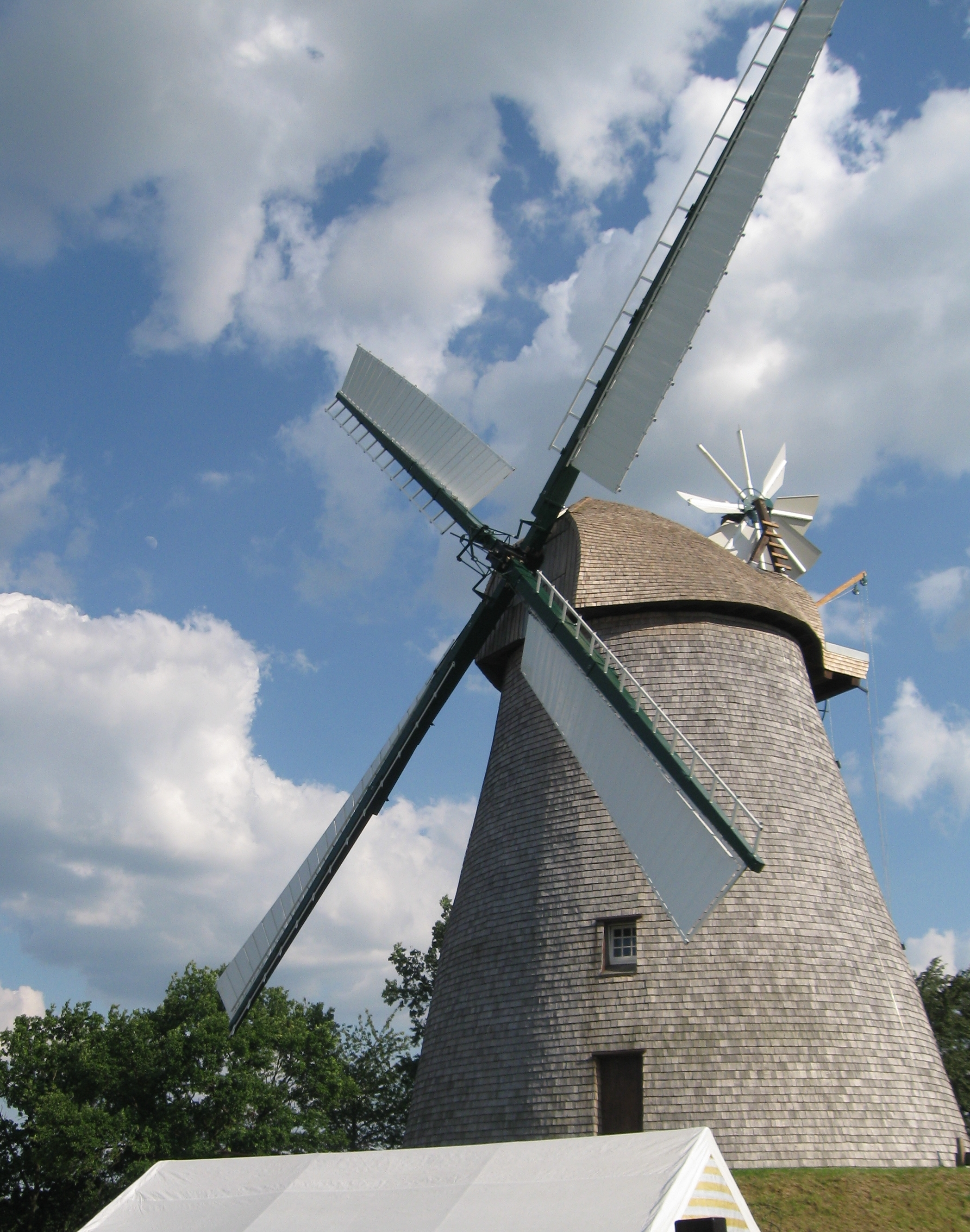
Renovated windmill in Solterwisch

== History ==
The area has been lived in since at least 4000 BC based on tools found. The name Exter was first mentioned in the 12th century in a document of the convent in Herford; the convent owned several of the farms in the village. The area now covered by Exter was made up by two Bauerschaften (i.e. a number of farms that together constitute a community but without a village centre): Exter and Solterwisch. A detailed 1828 map showing ownership of the together 150 farms is known as the Schluckebierkarte, so named after the architect Richard Schluckebier, who based the map on the original cadastral map compiled by Prussian officials in the 1820s and amended by ownershipdetails. In c. 1865, the two Bauerschaften were amalgated to form the current village boundaries.

=== Sovereignty ===
Prior to 1807, Exter came under County of Ravensberg and was administered by the District Vlotho, one of the four districts (Amt) of the county. From 1807 to 1813, it belonged to the Kingdom of Westphalia (i.e. was under Napoleonic rule, also known as the French period), with Exter under the Canton of Vlotho. After the German campaign of 1813, the area was regained by Prussia. The Canton of Vlotho, following the establishments of the districts of Germany in 1816, came under the district of Herford. This arrangement existed until after the second world war, when in 1946 the states were founded. Vlotho came under the administrative region of Detmold of North Rhine-Westphalia.

"Amt Vlotho" was dissolved in 1969. The three municipalities that had made up Vlotho (Exter and Valdorf, apart from Vlotho itself) were amalgamated to form the town of Vlotho.

== Attractions ==
The windmill built in 1850 in Solterwisch has been renovated and is fully functional.

The Evangelical Lutheran church, built in 1666, was consecrated as the first Evangelical highway church in Germany in 1959.
