= Burg Vlotho =

German castle ruin

- Vlotho
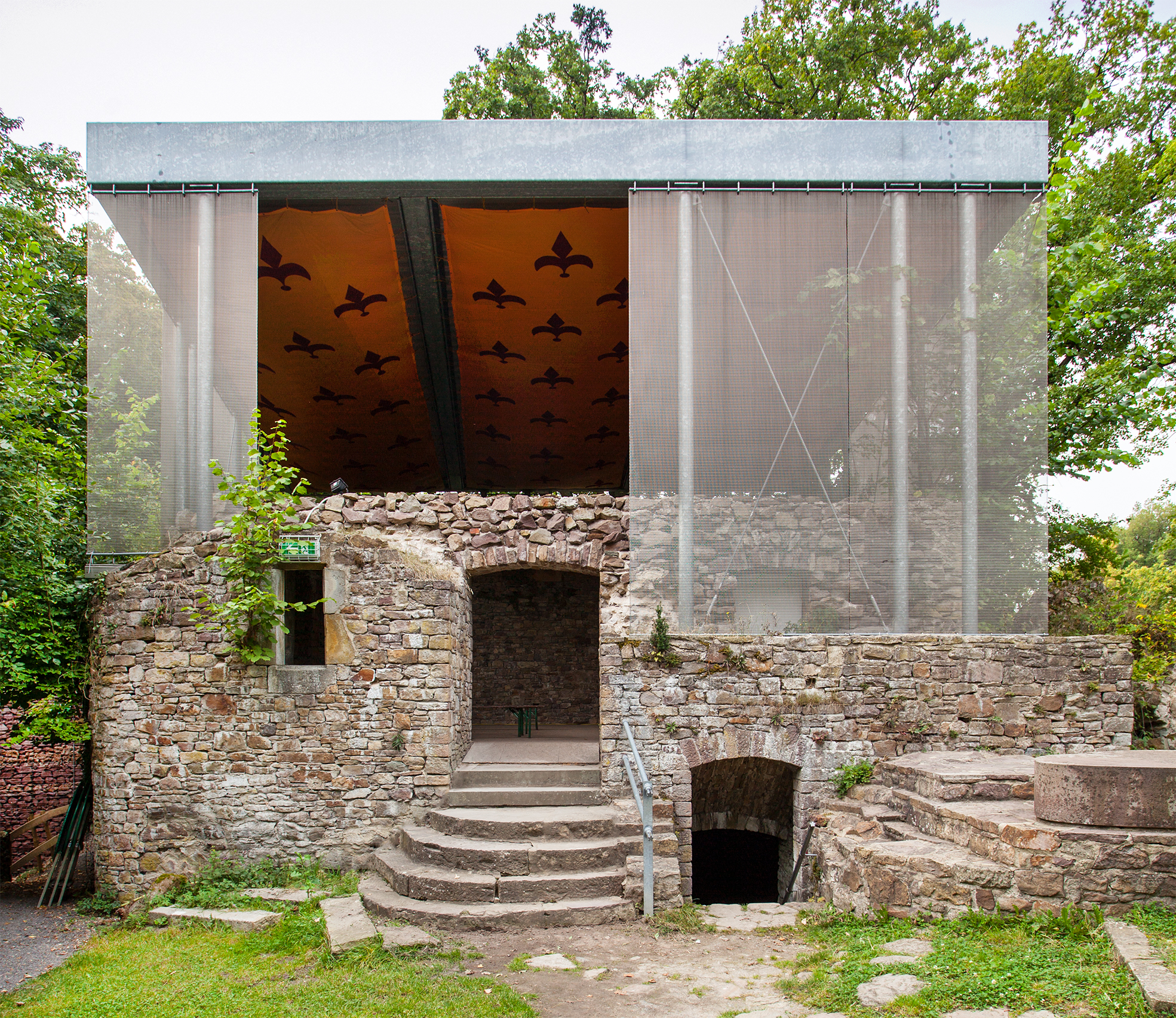
- Reconstructed palas with modern roof

Site information
- Type: hill castle, spur castle
- Code: DE-NW
- Condition: weitgehend nachgebildete Ruine

Location
- Location within Germany
- Coordinates: 52°10′17″N 8°51′34″E
- Height: 141 m above sea level (NN)

Site history
- Built: around 1250

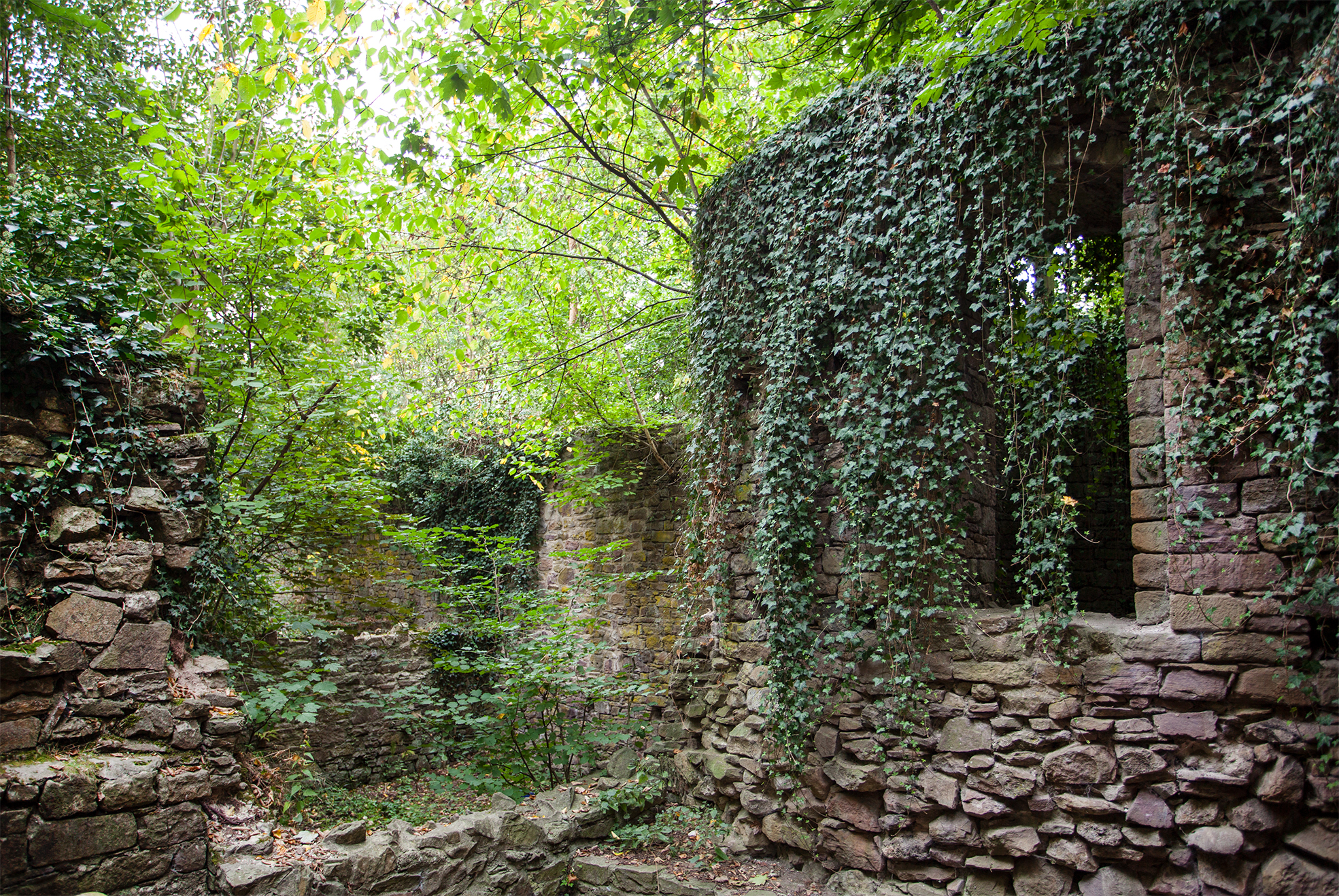
Reconstructed parts of the castle

Burg Vlotho (Vlotho castle) is the ruin of a medieval hill castle above the town of Vlotho, Herford district, North Rhine-Westphalia, Germany. The ruins were reconstructed after archeological survey in 1936 to 1939.

== Lage ==
The extended property is located on the Amtshausberg, 141 metres (463 ft), and almost 100 metres (330 ft) m above the Weser, with a steep grade to east and south. The bent river has a natural harbour, on the medieval main road from Frankfurt to Bremen.

=== History ===
The castle was built around 1250. It was razed around 1368. The foundation is the only part from the medieval period. Drawings dating back to 1581 are extant, but they are no reliable representation. The castle ruins were demolished in 1709, with only the dungeon surviving until 1936. The castle ruin is c. 110 metres (360 ft) m long and c. 60 metres (200 ft) m wide. The surrounding wall is mostly preserved.

Part of the reconstructed castle is covered by a modern protective roof. The property features a restaurant with garden area. The terrace offers a view over the Weser valley.
