= Albion (Saxon) =

Germanic leader of the Saxons in the time of Charlemagne

Abbi
- Occupation: Warrior
- Known for: Fought alongside Widukind

Albion (or Abbion shortened to Abbio or Abbi, also Alboin) was a Germanic leader of the Saxons in the time of Charlemagne. (exact dates remain unknown)

Albbi is considered one of the two principal Saxon chiefs along with Widukind. He was the leader of the Eastphalians while the latter ruled the Westphalian Saxons. Both opposed the aggressive eastern expansion of the Carolingian Empire. They mustered an army and fought Charlemagne in two major battles, at Osnabrück and Detmold. After these conflicts the Saxons were recorded to have taken 4,000 prisoners.

In 785, after being defeated in the Saxon wars, fleeing across the Elbe, Albion was baptized together with Widukind, possibly in Attigny, with Charlemagne as his godfather. He was possibly married to Giesela (or Hasela), a daughter or sister to Widukind, and therefore closely related to him. Albion was said to be the ancestor of the House of Ascania.
