= Theoderic, Duke of Saxony =

Leader of the Saxons in 743–744

Theoderic or Theodric (Low German Diederik or Didrik, High German Dietrich) was the leader of the Saxons in the years 743–744. Onomastics suggests that he was related to the family of Widukind.

In 743 the Frankish mayors of the palace, the brothers Pepin the Short and Carloman, marched against Odilo of Bavaria, who was nominally a Frankish subject. Carloman then turned north towards Saxony, which had ceased to pay the annual tribute of cows which the Franks had extorted first in the sixth century, and conquering the castrum of Ho(o)hseoburg forced the Saxon duke Theoderic to surrender at a placitum held at that same place.

The brothers invaded Saxony again the next year (744) and Theoderic was captured.

== Sources ==
Einhard. "Annales Regni Francorum" [Annesl Kingdom of France] (in Latin).

Preceded by Berthoald	Rulers of Saxony ?	Succeeded by Widukind
