= Wolfgang Assbrock =

German politician (1952–2007)

Wolfgang Assbrock (German: Aßbrock) (10 September 1952 – 6 December 2007) was a German politician. He was a member of the CDU, and sat in the Landtag of North Rhine-Westphalia.

Assbrock was born in Herford, and earned a Fachhochschule degree in 1971. He held a number of positions in local industry, politics, and in the CDU in Herford, Enger, and Bielefeld from the 1970s. In 1999 he became local chairman of the CDU in Herford, and on 8 June 2005 he was elected to the Landtag of North Rhine-Westphalia.

Among other positions, he advocated a stronger role for Christian values against "postmodern arbitrariness" (postmoderne Beliebigkeit) and Islamic fundamentalism.
