= Hiddenhausen =

- Town
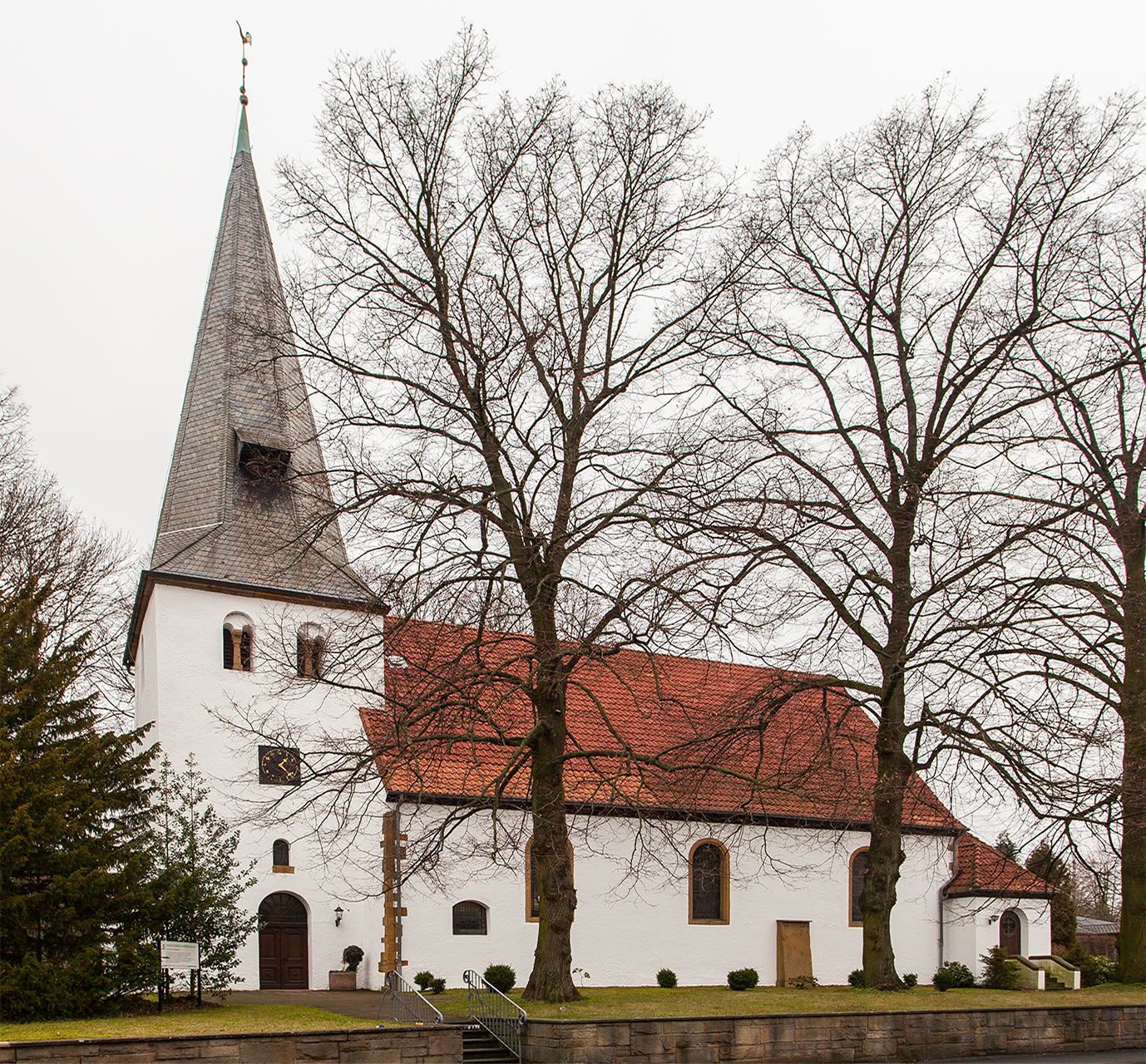
- Lutheran Church of Saint Gangolf

- Flag Coat of arms

- Location of Hiddenhausen within Herford district
- Interactive map of Hiddenhausen
- Location within Germany Location within North Rhine-Westphalia
- Coordinates: 52°10′00″N 08°37′00″E
- Country: Germany
- State: North Rhine-Westphalia
- Admin. region: Detmold
- District: Herford
- Subdivisions: 6

Government
  - Mayor (2020–25): Andreas Hüffmann (SPD)

Area
  - Total: 23.87 km^{2} (9.22 sq mi)
- Elevation: 92 m (302 ft)

Population (2025-12-31)
  - Total: 19,639
  - Density: 822.7/km^{2} (2,131/sq mi)
- Time zone: UTC+01:00 (CET)
  - Summer (DST): UTC+02:00 (CEST)
- Postal codes: 32120
- Dialling codes: 05221 (Herford); 05223 (Bünde); 05224 (Enger)
- Vehicle registration: HF
- Website: www.hiddenhausen.de

Hiddenhausen (German pronunciation: [hɪdn̩ˈhaʊzn̩]; Low German: Hiddenkussen) is a municipality in the district of Herford, in North Rhine-Westphalia, Germany. The municipality was formed in 1969 in a reform of Herford (district) by combining the villages of Lippinghausen, Eilshausen, Schweicheln-Bermbeck, Hiddenhausen, Oetinghausen and Sundern.

== Geography ==
Hiddenhausen is situated approximately 6 km north-west of the centre of Herford and 15 km north-east of Bielefeld.

=== Neighbouring places ===
- Bünde
- Kirchlengern
- Löhne
- Herford
- Enger

=== Division of the town ===
Hiddenhausen consists of 6 districts:

- Eilshausen (4,909 inhabitants)
- Hiddenhausen (2,755 inhabitants)
- Lippinghausen (2,892 inhabitants)
- Oetinghausen (4,038 inhabitants)
- Schweicheln-Bermbeck (5,329 inhabitants)
- Sundern (1,578 inhabitants)

== Population ==
Historical population

Year	Pop.	±% p.a.
1965	17,618	—
1970	18,966	+1.49%
1975	19,616	+0.68%
1980	19,674	+0.06%
1985	19,379	−0.30%
1990	19,945	+0.58%
1995	20,474	+0.52%

Year	Pop.	±% p.a.
2000	21,039	+0.55%
2005	20,659	−0.36%
2010	19,846	−0.80%
2015	19,758	−0.09%
2020	19,724	−0.03%
2025	19,639	−0.09%

Source: Landesdatabank Nordrhein-Westfalen

== Twin towns ==
- Loitz (Mecklenburg-Western Pomerania, Germany)
- Czechowice-Dziedzice (Poland)
- Kungälv (Sweden)
