= Friedrich-Wilhelm Graefe zu Baringdorf =

German politician (born 1942)

Friedrich-Wilhelm Graefe zu Baringdorf (born 29 November 1942 in Spenge) was Member of the European Parliament for the German political party Alliance 90/The Greens, part of the European Greens, from 1984 to 1987 and 1989 to 2009, and from 1996 to 2012 chairperson of the Arbeitsgemeinschaft bäuerliche Landwirtschaft (ABL), an association for peasant-based or family-farming in Germany.

Graefe zu Baringdorf owns and operates the farm "Berninghof" in Baringdorf, a small ribbon-built village in the municipality Spenge. The family farm traces its heritage back several centuries. In 1992, he converted the farm to ecological farming. Potatoes, bread cereals and vegetables grow on the fields, and pigs and chickens give meat and eggs. The produce is marketed primarily in the shop on the farm itself and via stands on street markets in Bielefeld and nearby Spenge.
