= Vlotho =

- Town
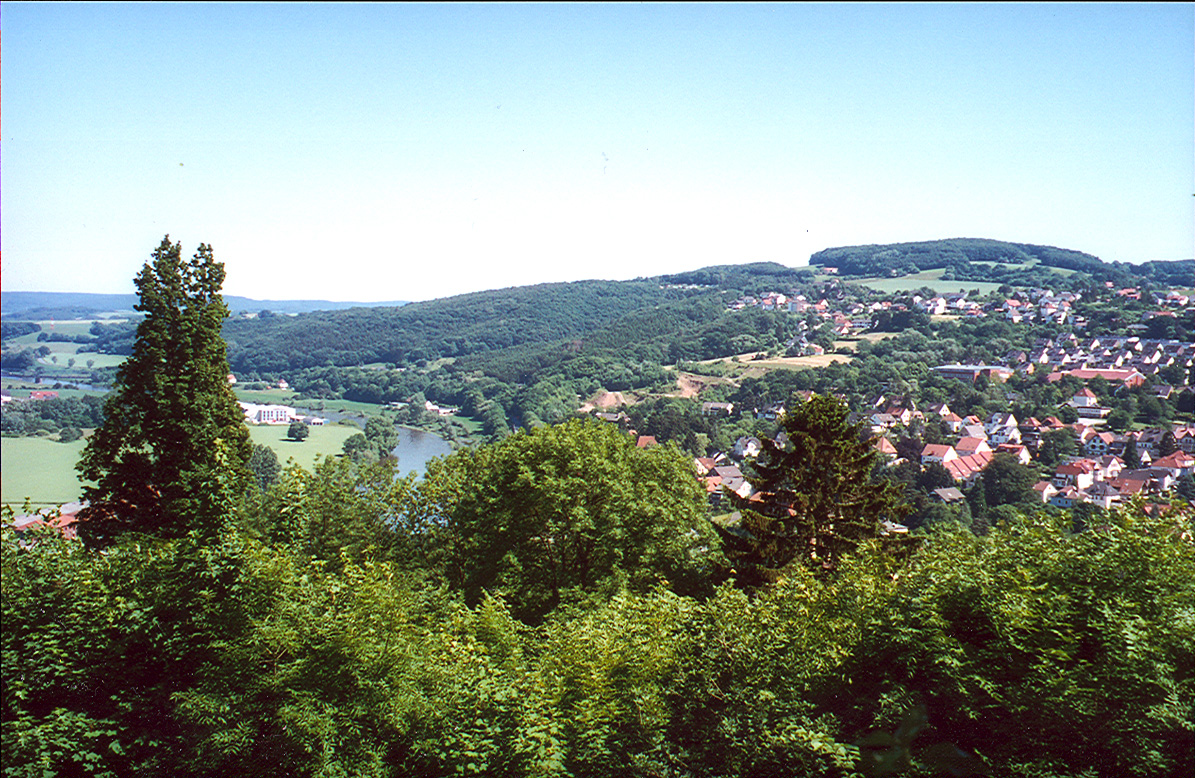
- Vlotho as seen from the castle on the Amthausberg

- Flag Coat of arms

- Location of Vlotho within Herford district
- Interactive map of Vlotho
- Location within Germany Location within North Rhine-Westphalia
- Coordinates: 52°10′00″N 08°50′59″E
- Country: Germany
- State: North Rhine-Westphalia
- Admin. region: Detmold
- District: Herford
- Subdivisions: 4

Government
  - Mayor (2020–25): Rocco Wilken (SPD)

Area
  - Total: 76.93 km^{2} (29.70 sq mi)
- Elevation: 109 m (358 ft)

Population (2025-12-31)
  - Total: 18,286
  - Density: 237.7/km^{2} (615.6/sq mi)
- Time zone: UTC+01:00 (CET)
  - Summer (DST): UTC+02:00 (CEST)
- Postal codes: 32602
- Dialling codes: 05733 (Vlotho); 05228 (Exter)
- Vehicle registration: HF
- Website: www.vlotho.de

Vlotho (German pronunciation: [ˈfloːto]) is a town in the district of Herford, in North Rhine-Westphalia, Germany.

== Geography ==
Vlotho is located along the Weser river, south of the Wiehengebirge, bordering on the Ravensberger Hügelland in the west, Lipperland in the south, and the Weserbergland in the east. The Weser river runs through the city east to north and thus separates the northeast part of the town, Uffeln, from the rest of the city. The highest point is the Bonstapel at 342 m in the south-east.

=== Neighbouring municipalities ===
Vlotho borders on Herford and Löhne in the west, Bad Oeynhausen and Porta Westfalica (both Minden-Lübbecke district) in the north, Kalletal in the east, and Lemgo and Bad Salzuflen (both Lippe district) in the south.

=== Division of the town ===
- Exter
- Uffeln
- Valdorf
- Vlotho

== History ==
The earliest historical records of Vlotho date back to the year 1185. In 1248, Vlotho gained the official status of a city, but this was subsequently lost due to depopulation resulting from pestilence and war. In the 17th century, Vlotho recovered as a location for industry, most notably paper. During the Thirty Years War, on 17 October 1638 Vlotho was the site of a battle, which resulted in a victory for an Imperial army under the command of Field Marshal Melchior, Count of Hatzfeldt over a Palatinate-Swedish army under the command of Charles Louis of Palatine. In 1650, Vlotho regained the right to hold a market, and in 1719, became an independent city. A harbour was built and Vlotho became the location of cigar, machine, and textile industry. In 1875, Vlotho station was constructed, and in 1928, a bridge replaced the ferry across the Weser river. In 1969, the old city of Vlotho was unified with the communities of Exter and Valdorf. In 1973, Uffeln (formerly part of the district of Minden) joined Vlotho.

== Population ==
Historical population

Year	Pop.	±% p.a.
1965	20,307	—
1970	21,074	+0.74%
1975	20,629	−0.43%
1980	19,949	−0.67%
1985	18,963	−1.01%
1990	19,592	+0.65%
1995	20,520	+0.93%

Year	Pop.	±% p.a.
2000	20,533	+0.01%
2005	20,035	−0.49%
2010	19,282	−0.76%
2015	18,914	−0.38%
2020	18,384	−0.57%
2025	18,286	−0.11%

Source: Landesdatabank Nordrhein-Westfalen

== Economy ==
A major part of the local economy is the emerging tourist industry. There is still some machine industry.

== Sightseeing ==
- Vlotho castle from the 13th century

== Notable people ==
- Ursula Haverbeck (1928–2024), Holocaust denier
- Helmut Rethemeier (born 1939), eventing rider, Olympian participant in 1976 (silver medal winner)
- Heinrich Adolf Rinne (1809–1868), doctor
- Axel Downard-Wilke (born 1966), transport planner and Wikipedian
