= Eberhard Werdin =

German composer

Eberhard Werdin (19 October 1911 in Spenge – 25 May 1991 in Weilheim in Oberbayern) was a German composer and writer on music.

He studied in Hanover, Bielefeld and Cologne, and then became a schoolteacher. From 1955 to 1969 he was a lecturer at the conservatory in Düsseldorf, and in 1952 he became a professor at the Municipal Music School in Leverkusen.

Werdin wrote music for the stage, works for school orchestras as well as professional orchestras, choral music and chamber music, including a large number of works for brass instruments. He also wrote on aspects of musical education.

One of his compositions is Concertino Fur Flöte, Gitarre und Streichorchester (1969).
