= Enger =

- Town
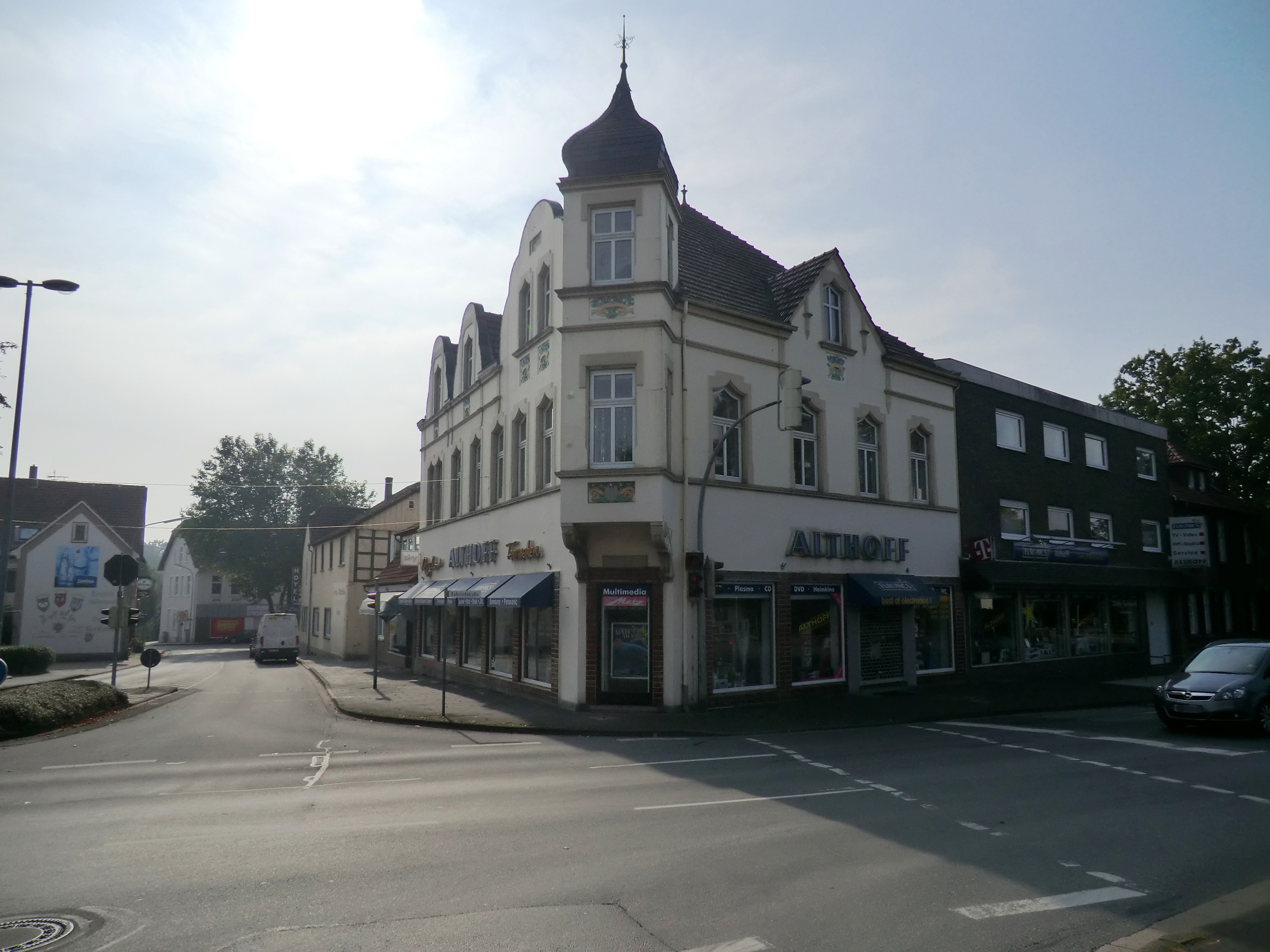

- Flag Coat of arms

- Location of Enger within Herford district
- Interactive map of Enger
- Location within Germany Location within North Rhine-Westphalia
- Coordinates: 52°8′N 8°34′E
- Country: Germany
- State: North Rhine-Westphalia
- Admin. region: Detmold
- District: Herford
- Subdivisions: 9

Government
  - Mayor (2020–25): Thomas Meyer (SPD)

Area
  - Total: 41.24 km^{2} (15.92 sq mi)
- Elevation: 107 m (351 ft)

Population (2025-12-31)
  - Total: 20,518
  - Density: 497.5/km^{2} (1,289/sq mi)
- Time zone: UTC+01:00 (CET)
  - Summer (DST): UTC+02:00 (CEST)
- Postal codes: 32130
- Dialling codes: 05224; 05225 (most of Westerenger); 05223 (parts of Besenkamp)
- Vehicle registration: HF
- Website: www.enger.de

Enger (German pronunciation: [ˈɛŋɐ]) is a town in the Herford district, in North Rhine-Westphalia, Germany.

== Geography ==
Enger is situated between the Teutoburg Forest and the Wiehen Hills, approx. 6 km west of the town of Herford, the capital of the district.

=== Neighbouring places ===
- Spenge
- Bünde
- Hiddenhausen
- Herford
- Bielefeld

=== Town divisions ===
Enger consists of the following districts (population as of December 31, 2005):

- Belke-Steinbeck (2,471 inhabitants)
- Besenkamp (1,849 inhabitants)
- Dreyen (1,404 inhabitants)
- Enger (7,809 inhabitants)
- Herringhausen (West) (430 inhabitants)
- Oldinghausen (773 inhabitants)
- Pödinghausen (2,181 inhabitants)
- Siele (122 inhabitants)
- Westerenger (3,797 inhabitants)

== History ==
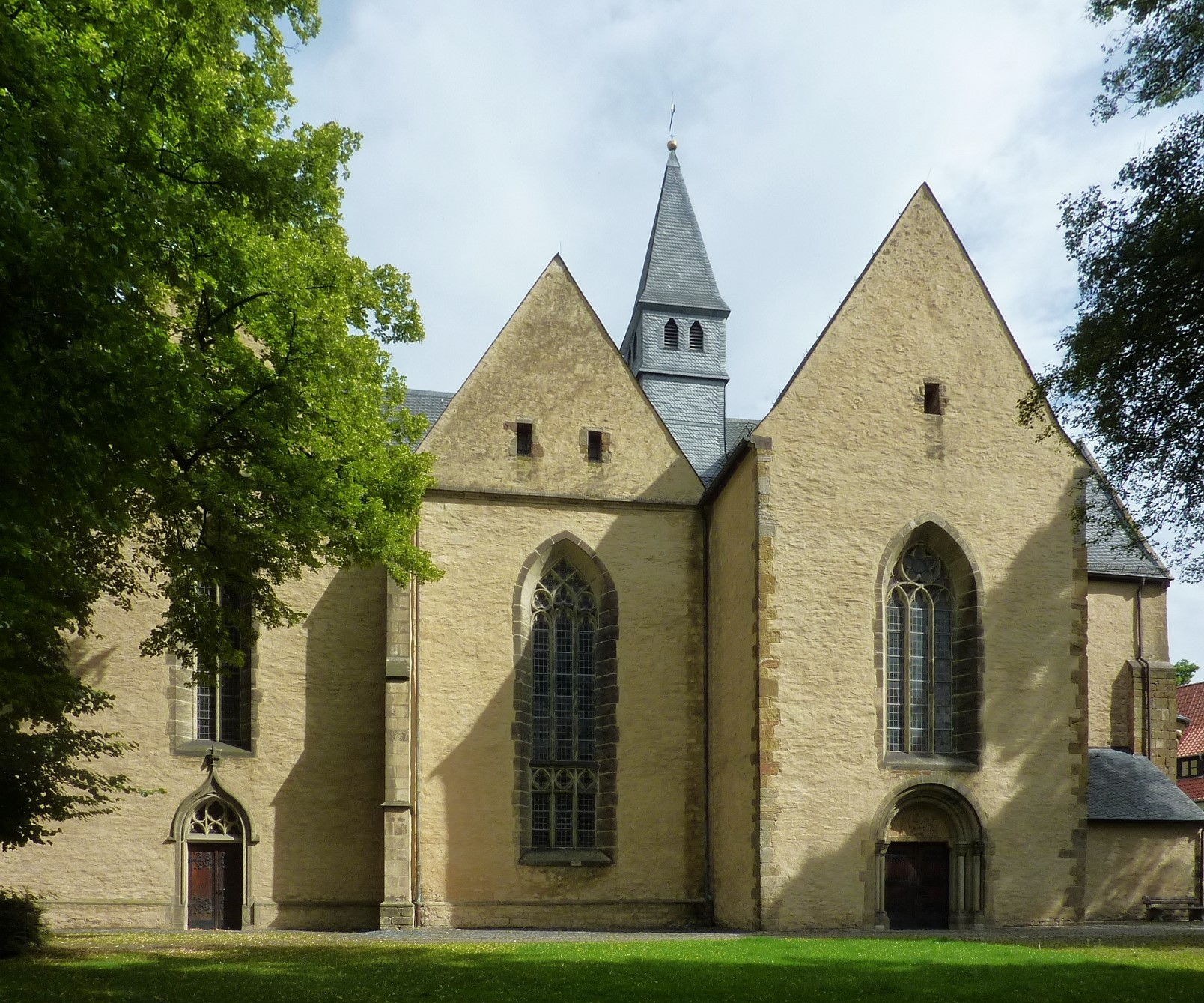
Lutheran Church St. Dionysius in Enger

The town, first mentioned in 948, calls itself "Widukind's town." The Saxon leader Widukind died about 808. However, there is no evidence that Enger existed in his lifetime.

A legend tells that Widukind founded a church in Enger after his baptism, and that he lived at the place until his death. He was buried in the church of Enger, and his monumental tomb is still there. Despite this, it remains doubtful that the remains of Widukind are actually in the tomb. Analysis shows that the memorial slab dates to the time around the year 1100.

The main current attractions of Enger are Widukind's tomb, the Widukind museum, the Widukind festival ("Timpkenfest"), held annually on January 6 and the "Kirschblütenfest" in April.

== Population ==
Historical population

Year	Pop.	±% p.a.
1965	15,845	—
1970	15,808	−0.05%
1975	15,926	+0.15%
1980	16,133	+0.26%
1985	16,481	+0.43%
1990	17,194	+0.85%
1995	18,925	+1.94%

Year	Pop.	±% p.a.
2000	19,963	+1.07%
2005	19,989	+0.03%
2010	20,010	+0.02%
2015	20,658	+0.64%
2020	20,469	−0.18%
2025	20,518	+0.05%

Source: Landesdatabank Nordrhein-Westfalen

== Notable people ==
- Wolfgang Aßbrock (1952–2007), politician and member of the North Rhine-Westphalian Parliament (2005–2007)
- Wilhelm Müller (1875–1957), politician
- Heinrich Vedder (1876–1972), missionary
