= Wage (disambiguation) =

A wage is the distribution from an employer of a security paid to an employee.

Wage may also refer to:

== Places ==
- Wage Rural LLG, Enga Province, Papua New Guinea
- Lower Wage Rural LLG, Hela Province, Papua New Guinea
- Upper Wage Rural LLG, Hela Province, Papua New Guinea

== Radio stations in the United States ==
- WAGE (FM) (91.1 FM), a defunct station in Dogwood Lakes Estate, Florida
- WAGE-LP (106.5 FM), a low-power station in Oak Hill, West Virginia
- WNDC (1190 AM), originally WAGE, in Leesburg, Virginia
- WHEN (AM) (620 AM), originally WAGE, in Syracuse, New York

== Other uses ==
- Wage Rudolf Supratman (1903–1938), Indonesian songwriter
- Wide Area GPS Enhancement
- Wage, a character in the 2019 film UglyDolls
- Wage (film), a 2017 Indonesian film directed by John de Rantau
