= Naming conventions of the International Phonetic Alphabet =

The International Phonetic Alphabet (IPA) requires specific names for the symbols and diacritics used in the alphabet.

It is often desirable to distinguish an IPA symbol from the sound it is intended to represent, since there is not a one-to-one correspondence between symbol and sound in broad transcription. The symbol's names and phonetic descriptions are described in the Handbook of the International Phonetic Association. The symbols also have nonce names in the Unicode standard. In some cases, the Unicode names and the IPA names do not agree. For example, IPA calls ɛ "epsilon", but Unicode calls it "small letter open E".

== Letters ==
The traditional names of the Latin and Greek letters are used for unmodified symbols. In Unicode, some of the symbols of Greek origin have Latin forms for use in IPA; others use the symbols from the Greek section.

Examples:

	IPA symbol name	phonetic description	Unicode name
p	(lowercase) p	voiceless bilabial stop	LATIN SMALL LETTER P
x	(lowercase) x	voiceless velar fricative	LATIN SMALL LETTER X
r	(lowercase) r	coronal trill	LATIN SMALL LETTER R
β	beta	voiced bilabial fricative	GREEK SMALL LETTER BETA
ɛ	epsilon	open-mid front unrounded vowel	LATIN SMALL LETTER OPEN E
ɣ	gamma	voiced velar fricative	LATIN SMALL LETTER GAMMA
θ	theta	voiceless dental fricative	GREEK SMALL LETTER THETA
χ	chi	voiceless uvular fricative	GREEK SMALL LETTER CHI
ɸ	phi (Note: The Latin phi; the old-style or Greek phi (φ) is used in linguistics to mark prosodic units (foot).)	voiceless bilabial fricative	LATIN SMALL LETTER PHI
ʊ	upsilon (Note: The Latin upsilon is frequently called "horseshoe u" in order to distinguish it from the Greek upsilon (υ). Historically, it derives from a Latin small capital ⟨ᴜ⟩. Greek upsilon is also an IPA symbol, called "Cursive V" in the Handbook.)	near-close near-back rounded vowel	LATIN SMALL LETTER UPSILON

Note

The IPA standard includes some small capital letters, such as ʀ and ɢ, although it is common to refer to these symbols as simply "capital" or "cap" letters, because the IPA standard does not include any full-size capital letters.

=== Cursive-based letters ===
A few letters have the forms of cursive or script letters. Examples:

	IPA symbol name	phonetic description	Unicode name
ɑ	single-story a	open back unrounded vowel	LATIN SMALL LETTER ALPHA
ɡ	single-story g (Note: The double-story g is not strictly an IPA character, but is an acceptable alternative.)	voiced velar stop	LATIN SMALL LETTER SCRIPT G
ʋ	cursive v (Note: In form and origin, but not in name, this is the Greek upsilon.)	labiodental approximant	LATIN SMALL LETTER V WITH HOOK

=== Ligatures ===
Ligatures are called precisely that, although Unicode often mistakenly calls them "digraphs". Examples:

	IPA symbol name	phonetic description	Unicode name
æ	lower-case A-E ligature	near-open front unrounded vowel	LATIN SMALL LETTER AE
œ	lower-case O-E ligature	open-mid front rounded vowel	LATIN SMALL LIGATURE OE
ɮ	L-Ezh ligature	voiced coronal lateral fricative	LATIN SMALL LETTER LEZH

Note that "œ" can alternatively be called ethel, and similarly "æ" can be called ash.

=== Rotated letters ===
Many letters are turned, or rotated 180 degrees. Examples:

	IPA symbol name	phonetic description	Unicode name
ʎ	turned Y	palatal lateral approximant	LATIN SMALL LETTER TURNED Y
ɥ	turned H	labial-palatal approximant	LATIN SMALL LETTER TURNED H
ɒ	turned script A	open back rounded vowel	LATIN SMALL LETTER TURNED ALPHA
ʌ	turned V (Note: The symbol ʌ is often also called "caret" for its similarity to that diacritic.)	open-mid back unrounded vowel	LATIN SMALL TURNED V
ɔ	open O (Note: The symbol ɔ is also described as a turned c, but it is usually referred to as open o, which describes both its articulation and its shape.)	open-mid back rounded vowel	LATIN SMALL LETTER OPEN O

Notes

A few letters are reversed (flipped on a vertical axis):

	IPA symbol name	phonetic description	Unicode name
ɘ	reversed e	close-mid central unrounded vowel	LATIN SMALL LETTER REVERSED E
ɜ	reversed epsilon	open-mid central unrounded vowel	LATIN SMALL LETTER REVERSED OPEN E
ʕ	reversed glottal stop (Note: This IPA symbol is often called by the name of the corresponding Semitic letter, ayin.)	voiced pharyngeal fricative	LATIN LETTER PHARYNGEAL VOICED FRICATIVE

Notes

A couple letters are inverted (flipped on a horizontal axis): ʁ inverted small capital R and the obsolete ʖ inverted glottal stop. (ʍ could also be called an inverted w, but turned w is more common.)

=== Letters with extra lines, curls and serifs ===
When a horizontal stroke is added, it is called a crossbar, as in ħ barred h, ɵ barred o, ʢ reversed barred glottal stop or barred ayin, and ɟ barred dotless j or barred gelded j (apparently never 'turned f').

One letter instead has a slash through it: ø slashed o.

The implosives have hook tops: ɓ hook-top b, ɗ hook-top d, etc., as does ɦ hook-top h.

Such an extension at the bottom of a letter is called a tail. It may be specified as left or right depending on which direction it turns, as in ɳ right-tail n, ɻ right-tail turned r, ɲ left-tail n, ʐ tail z (or just retroflex z), etc. Note that ŋ is called eng or engma, ɱ meng, and ꜧ heng.

When the tail loops over itself, it's called curly: ʝ curly-tail j, ɕ curly-tail c.

There are also a few unique modifications: ɬ belted l, ɞ closed reversed epsilon (there was once also a ɷ closed omega), ɰ right-leg turned m, ɺ turned long-leg r (there was once also a long-leg r), ǁ double pipe, and the obsolete ʗ stretched c.

Several non-English letters have traditional names: ç c cedilla, ð eth (also spelled edh), ŋ engma or eng, ə schwa (also spelled shwa), ǃ exclamation mark, ǀ pipe.

Other symbols are unique to the IPA, and have developed their own quirky names: ɾ fish-hook r, ɤ ram's horns, ʘ bull's eye, ʃ esh (apparently never 'stretched s'), ʒ ezh (sometimes confused with yogh), ɧ hook-top heng.

The ʔ is usually called by the sound it represents, glottal stop. This is not normally a problem, because this symbol is seldom used to represent anything else. However, to specify the symbol itself, it is sometimes unofficially called a gelded question mark. This latter name is derived from its original form as a dotless question mark in a fashion reminiscent of gelding.

== Diacritic marks ==
=== Traditionally named diacritics ===
é acute, ē macron, è grave, ê circumflex, ě wedge or háček, ë diaeresis or umlaut, ĕ breve, ẽ (superscript) tilde, plus variants such as ḛ subscript tilde, ɫ superimposed tilde, etc.

=== Non-traditionally named diacritics ===
d̼ seagull, e˞ hook, e̽ over-cross, d ̚ corner, d̪ bridge, d̺ inverted bridge, d̻ square, e̥ under-ring, e̊ over-ring, e̜ left half-ring, e̹ right half-ring, e̟ plus, e̠ under-bar, e̯ arch, d̬ subscript wedge, e̝ up tack, e̞ down tack, e̘ left tack, e̙ right tack, d͡z tie bar, ẹ under-dot, n̩ under-stroke.

Diacritics are alternately named after their function. This would mean that the bridge is called the dental sign, the under-stroke is the syllabicity sign, and the up tack is the raising sign.

Place →	Labial					Coronal										Dorsal					Laryngeal			
Manner ↓	Bilabial		Labiodental		Linguolabial		Dental		Alveolar		Postalveolar		Retroflex		(Alveolo-)palatal		Velar		Uvular		Pharyngeal/epiglottal		Glottal	
Nasal	m̥	m	ɱ̊	ɱ		n̼	n̪̊	n̪	n̥	n	n̠̊	n̠	ɳ̊	ɳ	ɲ̊	ɲ	ŋ̊	ŋ	ɴ̥	ɴ				
Plosive	p	b	p̪	b̪	t̼	d̼	t̪	d̪	t	d			ʈ	ɖ	c	ɟ	k	ɡ	q	ɢ	ʡ		ʔ	
Sibilant affricate							t̪s̪	d̪z̪	ts	dz	t̠ʃ	d̠ʒ	tʂ	dʐ	tɕ	dʑ								
Non-sibilant affricate	pɸ	bβ	p̪f	b̪v			t̪θ	d̪ð	tɹ̝̊	dɹ̝	t̠ɹ̠̊˔	d̠ɹ̠˔			cç	ɟʝ	kx	ɡɣ	qχ	ɢʁ	ʡʜ	ʡʢ	ʔh	
Sibilant fricative							s̪	z̪	s	z	ʃ	ʒ	ʂ	ʐ	ɕ	ʑ								
Non-sibilant fricative	ɸ	β	f	v	θ̼	ð̼	θ	ð	θ̠	ð̠	ɹ̠̊˔	ɹ̠˔	ɻ̊˔	ɻ˔	ç	ʝ	x	ɣ	χ	ʁ	ħ	ʕ	h	ɦ
Approximant		β̞		ʋ				ð̞		ɹ		ɹ̠		ɻ		j		ɰ						˷
Tap/flap		ⱱ̟		ⱱ					ɾ̥	ɾ			ɽ̊	ɽ						ɢ̆		ʡ̮		
Trill	ʙ̥	ʙ							r̥	r		r̠	ɽ̊r̥	ɽr					ʀ̥	ʀ	ʜ	ʢ		
Lateral affricate									tɬ	dɮ			tꞎ	d𝼅	c𝼆	ɟʎ̝	k𝼄	ɡʟ̝						
Lateral fricative							ɬ̪		ɬ	ɮ			ꞎ	𝼅	𝼆	ʎ̝	𝼄	ʟ̝						
Lateral approximant								l̪	l̥	l		l̠	ɭ̊	ɭ	ʎ̥	ʎ	ʟ̥	ʟ		ʟ̠				
Lateral tap/flap									ɺ̥	ɺ			𝼈̊	𝼈		ʎ̮		ʟ̆						

		BL	LD	D	A	PA	RF	P	V	U
Implosive	Voiced	ɓ			ɗ		ᶑ	ʄ	ɠ	ʛ
Implosive	Voiceless	ɓ̥			ɗ̥		ᶑ̊	ʄ̊	ɠ̊	ʛ̥
Ejective	Stop	pʼ			tʼ		ʈʼ	cʼ	kʼ	qʼ
Ejective	Affricate		p̪fʼ	t̪θʼ	tsʼ	t̠ʃʼ	tʂʼ	tɕʼ	kxʼ	qχʼ
Ejective	Fricative	ɸʼ	fʼ	θʼ	sʼ	ʃʼ	ʂʼ	ɕʼ	xʼ	χʼ
Ejective	Lateral affricate				tɬʼ			c𝼆ʼ	k𝼄ʼ	q𝼄ʼ
Ejective	Lateral fricative				ɬʼ					
Click (top: velar; bottom: uvular)	Tenuis	kʘ qʘ		kǀ qǀ	kǃ qǃ		k𝼊 q𝼊	kǂ qǂ		
Click (top: velar; bottom: uvular)	Voiced	ɡʘ ɢʘ		ɡǀ ɢǀ	ɡǃ ɢǃ		ɡ𝼊 ɢ𝼊	ɡǂ ɢǂ		
Click (top: velar; bottom: uvular)	Nasal	ŋʘ ɴʘ		ŋǀ ɴǀ	ŋǃ ɴǃ		ŋ𝼊 ɴ𝼊	ŋǂ ɴǂ	ʞ	
Click (top: velar; bottom: uvular)	Tenuis lateral				kǁ qǁ					
Click (top: velar; bottom: uvular)	Voiced lateral				ɡǁ ɢǁ					
Click (top: velar; bottom: uvular)	Nasal lateral				ŋǁ ɴǁ					
