= Löhne =

- Town
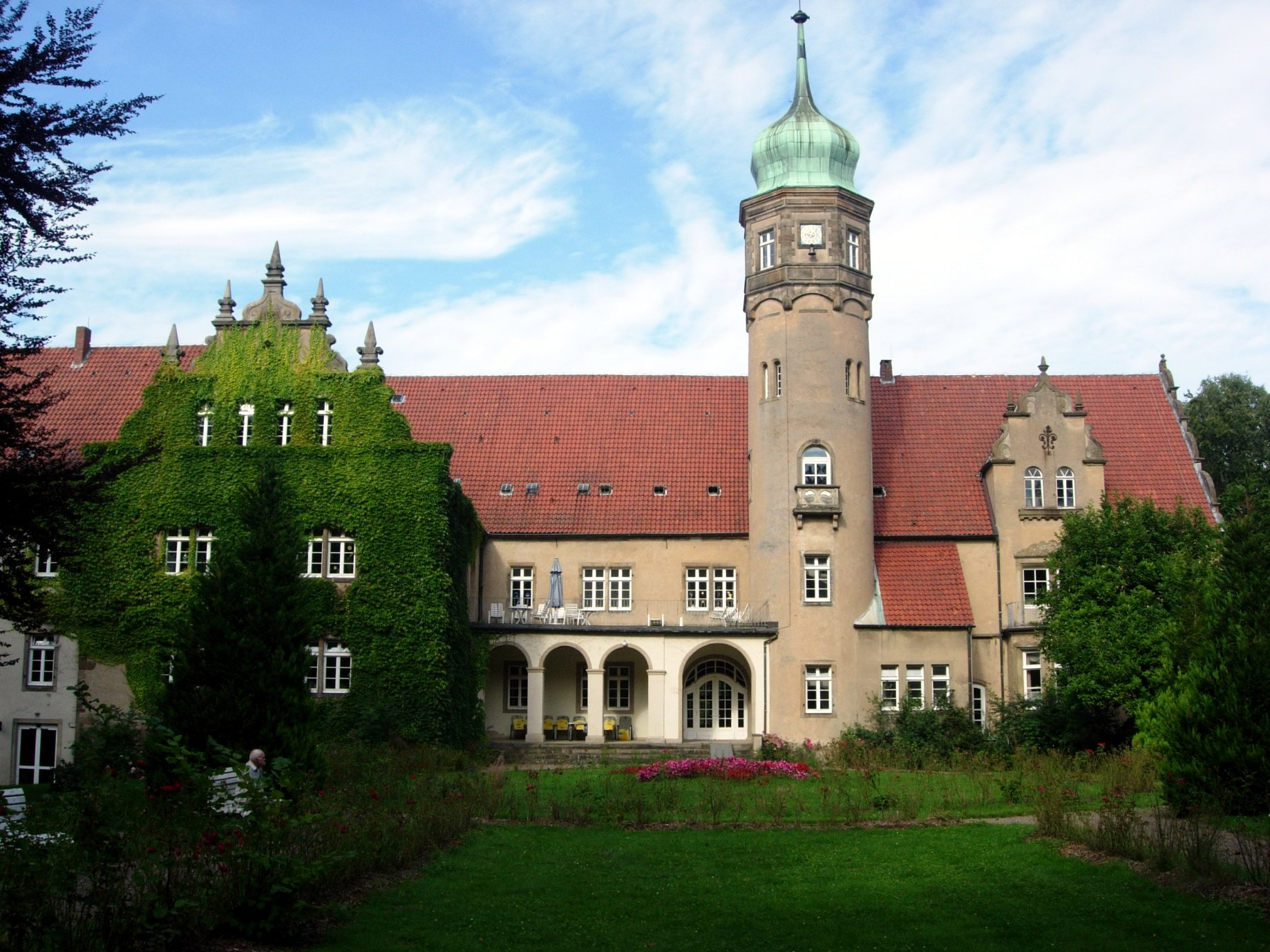
- Ulenburg Castle

- Flag Coat of arms

- Location of Löhne within Herford district
- Interactive map of Löhne
- Location within Germany Location within North Rhine-Westphalia
- Coordinates: 52°12′N 8°42′E
- Country: Germany
- State: North Rhine-Westphalia
- Admin. region: Detmold
- District: Herford
- Subdivisions: 5

Government
  - Mayor (2020–25): Bernd Poggemöller (SPD)

Area
  - Total: 59.51 km^{2} (22.98 sq mi)
- Elevation: 70 m (230 ft)

Population (2025-12-31)
  - Total: 40,757
  - Density: 684.9/km^{2} (1,774/sq mi)
- Time zone: UTC+01:00 (CET)
  - Summer (DST): UTC+02:00 (CEST)
- Postal codes: 32584
- Dialling codes: 05732, 05731 (Gohfeld), 05228 (Wittel)
- Vehicle registration: HF
- Website: www.loehne.de

Löhne (German pronunciation: [ˈløːnə]; Low German: Loihne, Loine) is a town in the district of Herford, in North Rhine-Westphalia, Germany.

== Geography ==
Löhne is situated on the river Werre, approx. 8 km north of Herford and 20 km south-west of Minden.

=== Neighbouring places ===
- Hüllhorst
- Bad Oeynhausen
- Vlotho
- Herford
- Hiddenhausen
- Kirchlengern

== Population ==
Historical population

| Year | Pop. | ±% p.a. |
|---|---|---|
| 1965 | 35,790 | — |
| 1970 | 37,494 | +0.93% |
| 1975 | 37,564 | +0.04% |
| 1980 | 37,150 | −0.22% |
| 1985 | 36,385 | −0.42% |
| 1990 | 38,557 | +1.17% |
| 1995 | 41,246 | +1.36% |

| Year | Pop. | ±% p.a. |
|---|---|---|
| 2000 | 41,421 | +0.08% |
| 2005 | 41,541 | +0.06% |
| 2010 | 40,199 | −0.65% |
| 2015 | 40,086 | −0.06% |
| 2020 | 39,871 | −0.11% |
| 2025 | 40,757 | +0.44% |

Source: Landesdatabank Nordrhein-Westfalen

== Twin towns – sister cities ==
Löhne is twinned with:

- Spittal an der Drau, Austria (1973)
- Columbus, United States (1993)
- Condega, Nicaragua (1994)
- Röbel, Germany (1996)
- Mielec, Poland (2002)

== Notable people ==
- Frederick Louis, Duke of Schleswig-Holstein-Sonderburg-Beck (1653–1728), Prussian field marshal
- Philip Louis, Duke of Schleswig-Holstein-Sonderburg-Wiesenburg (1620–1689), founder and first duke of the line Schleswig-Holstein-Sonderburg-Wiesenburg
