= Widukind =

Duke of Saxony from 777 to 785

- dux Saxonum
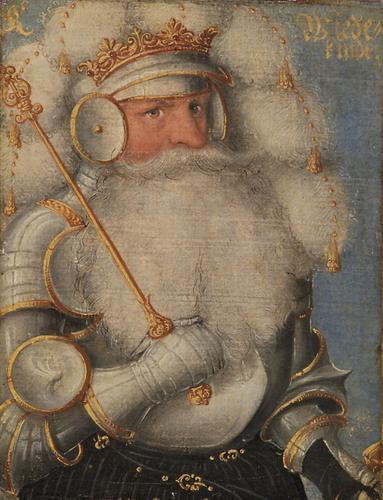
- 15th-century portrait of Widukind by Lucas Cranach the Elder
- Reign: ?–785
- Predecessor: Theoderic
- Successor: Egbert
- Born: Unknown
- Died: 807 or 808 possibly Enger, near Herford
- Buried: Stiftskirche, Enger
- Noble family: House of Odon, possibly progenitor of Immedingians

Widukind, also known as Wittekind and Wittikund, was a leader of the Saxons and the chief opponent of the Frankish king Charlemagne during the Saxon Wars from 777 to 785. Charlemagne ultimately prevailed, organized Saxony as a Frankish province, massacred thousands of Saxon nobles, and ordered conversions of the pagan Saxons to Christianity. In later times, Widukind became a symbol of Saxon independence and a figure of legend. He is also venerated as a Blessed in the Catholic Church.

== Life ==
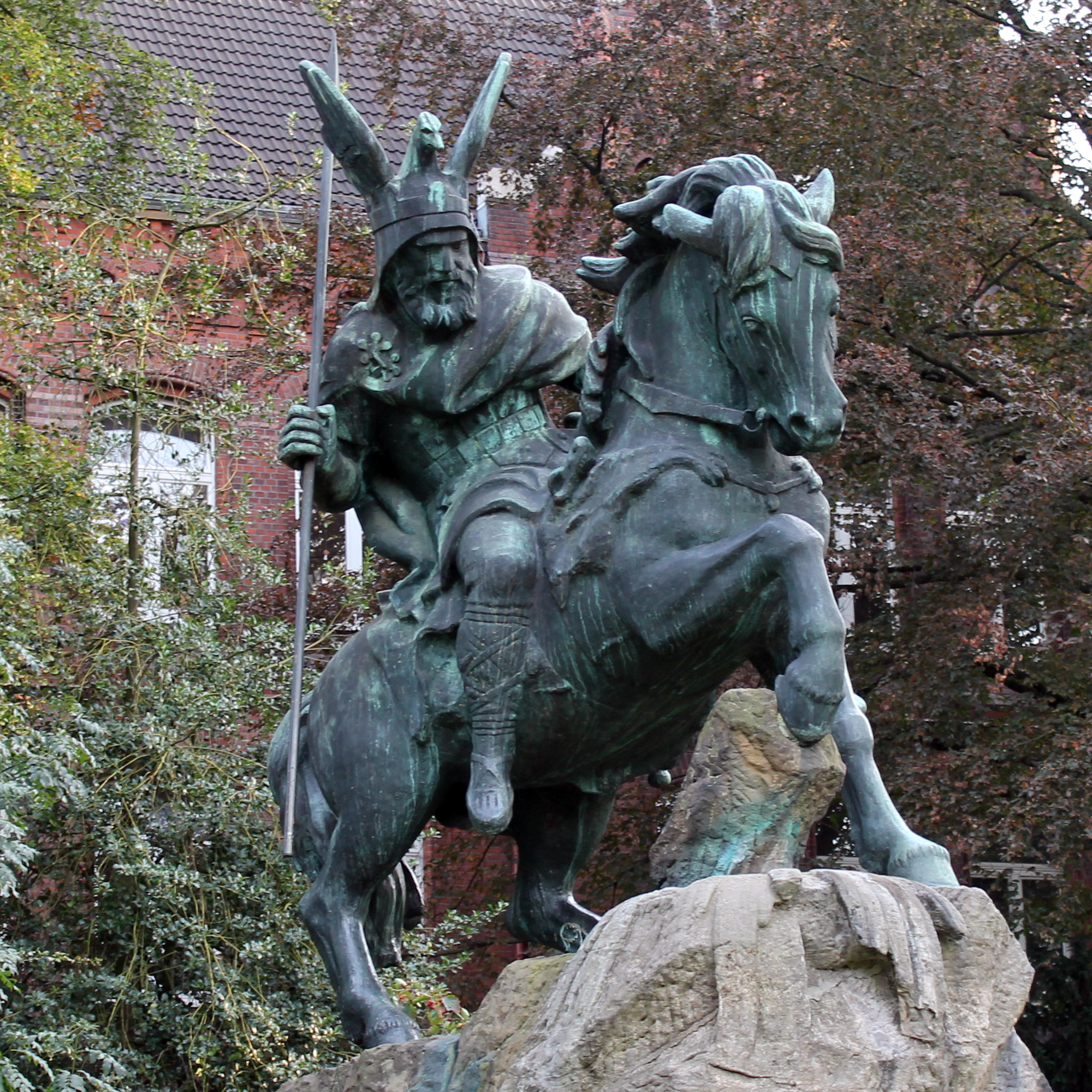
Modern statue of Widukind in Herford, North Rhine-Westphalia

Very little is known about Widukind's life. His name literally translates as "child of the forest". In the chronicles he is accompanied by Abbi who may have been a close relative. However, it is uncertain how they were related because all sources about him stem from his enemies, the Franks, who painted a negative picture representing him as an "insurgent" and a "traitor". While Widukind was considered the leader of the Saxon resistance by the Franks, his exact role in the military campaigns is unknown.

According to the Royal Frankish Annals, the Franks campaigned in Saxony in 772, when Charlemagne ordered the destruction of the Irminsul sanctuary. The Saxon Wars continued when Westphalian tribes devastated the church of Deventer and the Angrarii laid siege to the Frankish court at Fritzlar. The king retaliated against the local nobility, enforcing the decree to incorporate the Saxon lands as a Frankish march.

Widukind was first mentioned by the Annals in 777 when he was the only one of the Saxon nobles not to appear at Charlemagne's court in Paderborn. Instead, he stayed with the Danish king Sigfred (possibly Sigurd Hring), enjoying his hospitality as he had recently married his sister, the Princess Geva. The next year, the Westphalians again invaded the Frankish Rhineland and subsequently fought a running battle against the Franks and their local allies while Charlemagne was busy in Spain.

By 782, Widukind had returned from Denmark and goaded the Saxon nobles into rebellion. From 782 to 784, battles between Saxons and Franks occurred annually, while Charlemagne had 4,500 Saxons executed at the Massacre of Verden. Widukind allied himself with the Frisians but Charlemagne's winter attacks of 784/785 were nevertheless successful, and the dux and his allies were pushed back to their homelands. Charlemagne, leading an expedition towards the mouth of the Elbe, learned that Widukind was in the land of the Nordalbingians, on the right bank of the river. In the Bardengau in 785, Widukind agreed to surrender in return for a guarantee that no bodily harm would be done to him. He and his allies were then baptized, possibly in Attigny, with Charlemagne as his godfather. Widukind thereby reached a peace agreement and the acknowledgement of the Saxon noble rank by their Frankish overlords.

There are no contemporary sources about Widukind's life or death after his baptism. Historian Gerd Althoff assumed that he was imprisoned at a monastery—a fate that happened to other rulers deposed by Charlemagne. He tried to identify Reichenau Abbey as a likely location where Widukind may have spent the rest of his life, but his results are inconclusive and widely rejected. Alternatively, he may have received a position in the administration of occupied Saxony. The Vita Liudgeri biography of Saint Ludger mentions him accompanying Charlemagne on his campaign against the Veleti leader Dragovit. According to the 12th-century Kaiserchronik, he was slain by Charlemagne's brother-in-law Gerold of Baar.

== Legend ==
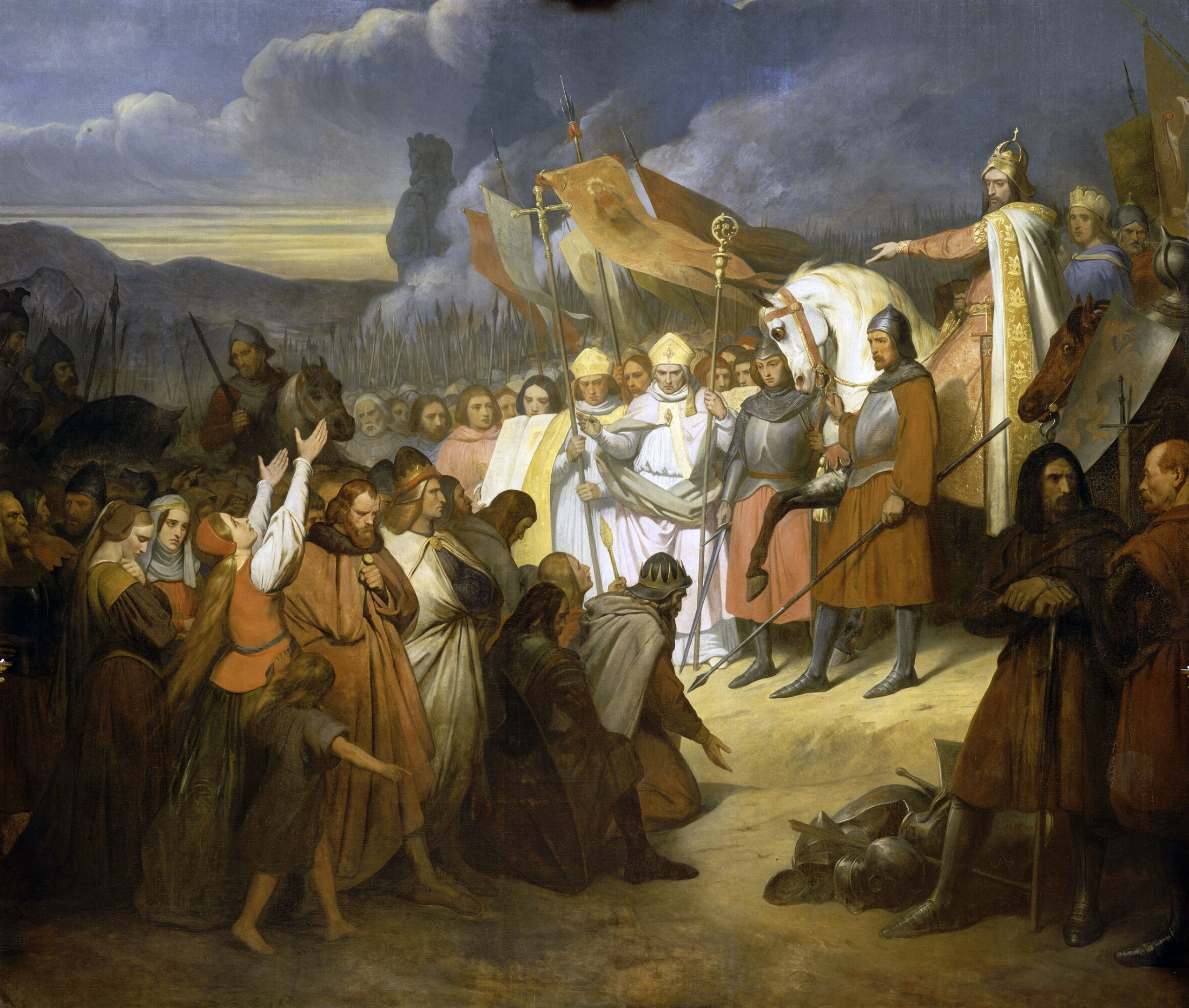
Charlemagne receiving the submission of Widukind at Paderborn (Ary Scheffer, 1840)

Numerous legends developed around Widukind's life; he eventually appeared as a saintly figure (becoming "Blessed Widukind") and the builder of many churches. He was later assumed to have died in 807 or 808; his feast day is commemorated on January 7.

According to legend, Widukind experienced a vision that led to his conversion. Disguised as a beggar, he was spying on Charlemagne's troop camp during Easter. He witnessed a priest performing a Holy Sacrifice of the Mass and the priest was holding a beautiful child during the consecration. To his astonishment, people would receive communion and the priest would give the same child to each person. Widukind was dumbfounded by this scene and went to beg outside after the mass. One of the emperor's servants recognized Widukind behind his disguise—due to an odd formation of one of his fingers—and Widukind was captured. He was interrogated and confessed to spying on Charlemagne's camp for the purpose of becoming better acquainted with the Christian faith. He later confessed the divine vision he had seen. The emperor concluded that God had given Widukind the grace of witnessing the divine child, Jesus, behind the Sacred Host of the Mass. Widukind then renounced his worship of pagan idols.

== Later perception ==
=== Medieval ===
Since the 9th century, Widukind had been idolized as a mythical hero. Around 1100, a tomb for him was made in Enger; recent excavations have found that the contents of the tomb are indeed early medieval, but are the remains of a young woman. In 1971, archaeologists discovered three graves in a prominent place in front of the altar. The remains of three men who had died in the early 9th century, two of them about sixty-year-old warriors, the third a young man, were identified after a DNA analysis in 2002 as half-brothers or maternal cousins and a nephew. The man buried in front of the altar is assumed to be Widukind. When in the 10th century Saxon kings (of the Ottonian dynasty) replaced the Frankish kings in East Francia (the later Holy Roman Empire), these kings proudly claimed descent from Widukind: Matilda, the wife of King Henry I, was apparently a great-great-great-granddaughter of Widukind. The House of Billung, to which several Dukes of Saxony belonged, had Matilda's sister among its ancestors and thus also claimed descent from Widukind. The Italian family Del Carretto (and its supposed French branch, family de Charette) also claimed to descend from the hero.

=== In German nationalism ===
Widukind became a hero for German nationalists in the early 20th century. German neo-pagans saw him as an heroic defender of Germany's traditional beliefs and their gods, resisting the Middle Eastern religion of Christianity. Christian nationalists also lauded him, linking Charlemagne with the humiliation of French domination after World War I, especially the occupation of the Rhineland, portraying Charlemagne as a "French" invader.

After the Nazi Party came to power in 1933, so many plays and other works were written about Widukind that there were complaints that he was becoming a cliché. Alfred Rosenberg praised him as a hero of German freedom, who finally joined with the founder of the German Reich (Charlemagne). Two important plays about the Saxon leader were produced in 1934, Der Sieger by Friedrich Forster and Wittekind by Edmund Kiss. The first celebrated the conversion of Widukind, but the second caused controversy because of its explicit anti-Christian message. In that play after the massacre of Verden, Saxon leaders say, "That is what the Christians have done; they feign love, but bring murder!"—a line that led to protests from the audience. The play portrays Catholic church leaders planning to destroy German freedom by forcing racial mixture on them, thus turning them into pliable "Untermenschen". Thousands of German maidens are captured and will be forced to mate with "Jews and Moors" unless Widukind converts, which he does only to avoid this horrifying prospect. He gives a speech saying that the survival of the German race was his principal concern, and that future generations will praise him for this when the true spirit of the German people arises once more.

=== Present ===
Many buildings are named after him in the area of Enger, including the Widukind-Gymnasium Enger.

== Sainthood ==
He is called 'Blessed Wittikund' in the Catholic Church and his feast day is celebrated on 7 January. Wittikund apparently saw an apparition of the child Jesus at Christmas mass one time. Following his baptism in 785 AD he forfeited engaging in warfare and became a prolific founder/restorer of churches; it was for this reason that he is regarded as a holy person.

== See also ==
- Abbi (Saxon)
- Ambiorix
- Alaric I
- Ardaric
- Arminius
- Athanaric
- Boudica
- Fritigern
- Gaius Julius Civilis
- Totila
- Tribigild
- Vercingetorix
- Viriathus

Preceded by Theoderic, Duke of Saxony	Rulers of Saxony –785	Succeeded by Egbert
