= Herford (district) =

Coordinates: 52°10′N 8°35′E

- District
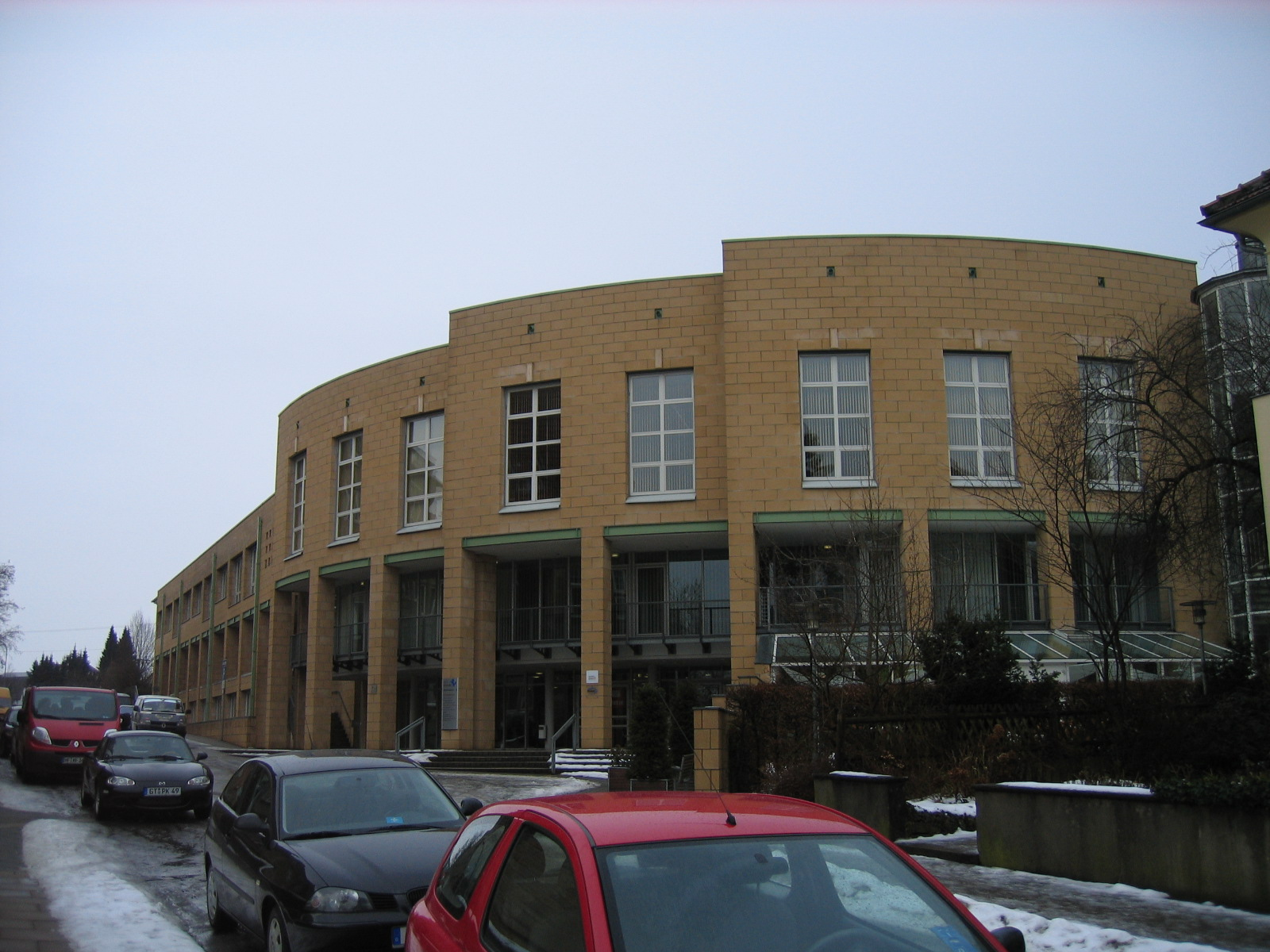
- Kreishaus (District office)

- Flag Coat of arms
- Country: Germany
- State: North Rhine-Westphalia
- Adm. region: Detmold
- Capital: Herford

Government
  - District admin.: Jürgen Müller (SPD)

Area
  - Total: 449.95 km^{2} (173.73 sq mi)

Population (31 December 2025)
  - Total: 253,431
  - Density: 563.24/km^{2} (1,458.8/sq mi)
- Time zone: UTC+01:00 (CET)
  - Summer (DST): UTC+02:00 (CEST)
- Vehicle registration: HF
- Website: http://www.kreis-herford.de

Herford (German pronunciation: [ˈhɛʁfɔʁt]) is a Kreis (district) in the northeastern part of North Rhine-Westphalia, Germany. Neighboring districts are Minden-Lübbecke, Lippe, the urban district of Bielefeld and the districts of Gütersloh and Osnabrück.

== History ==
The region is also known as Wittekind's land, as the last fights of Wittekind's Saxon tribes against Charlemagne took place here. He is believed to be buried in the town of Enger.

When the area became part of the Prussian province of Westphalia, the first district, Herford, was created in 1816. In 1832 it was merged with the district of Bünde. In 1911 the city of Herford left the district; however it lost its status as an independent urban district in 1969. The district reached its current size in 1973 when the municipality of Uffeln, which was formerly in the district of Minden, was merged into the city Vlotho.

== Geography ==
The district is located between the three mountain chains of the Wiehen Hills in the north and the Teutoburg Forest in the south. To the northeast it is bounded by the Weser river.

== Coat of arms ==
The black horse of Wittekind is depicted in the coat of arms of the district. After Wittekind was baptized Charlemagne gave him a white horse as present, which is now in the coat of arms of North Rhine-Westphalia and Lower Saxony.

== Towns and municipalities ==
Clickable map of towns and municipalities in the district

Towns
1. Bünde
2. Enger
3. Herford
4. Löhne
5. Spenge
6. Vlotho
Municipalities
1. Hiddenhausen
2. Kirchlengern
3. Rödinghausen
