= Spenge =

- Town
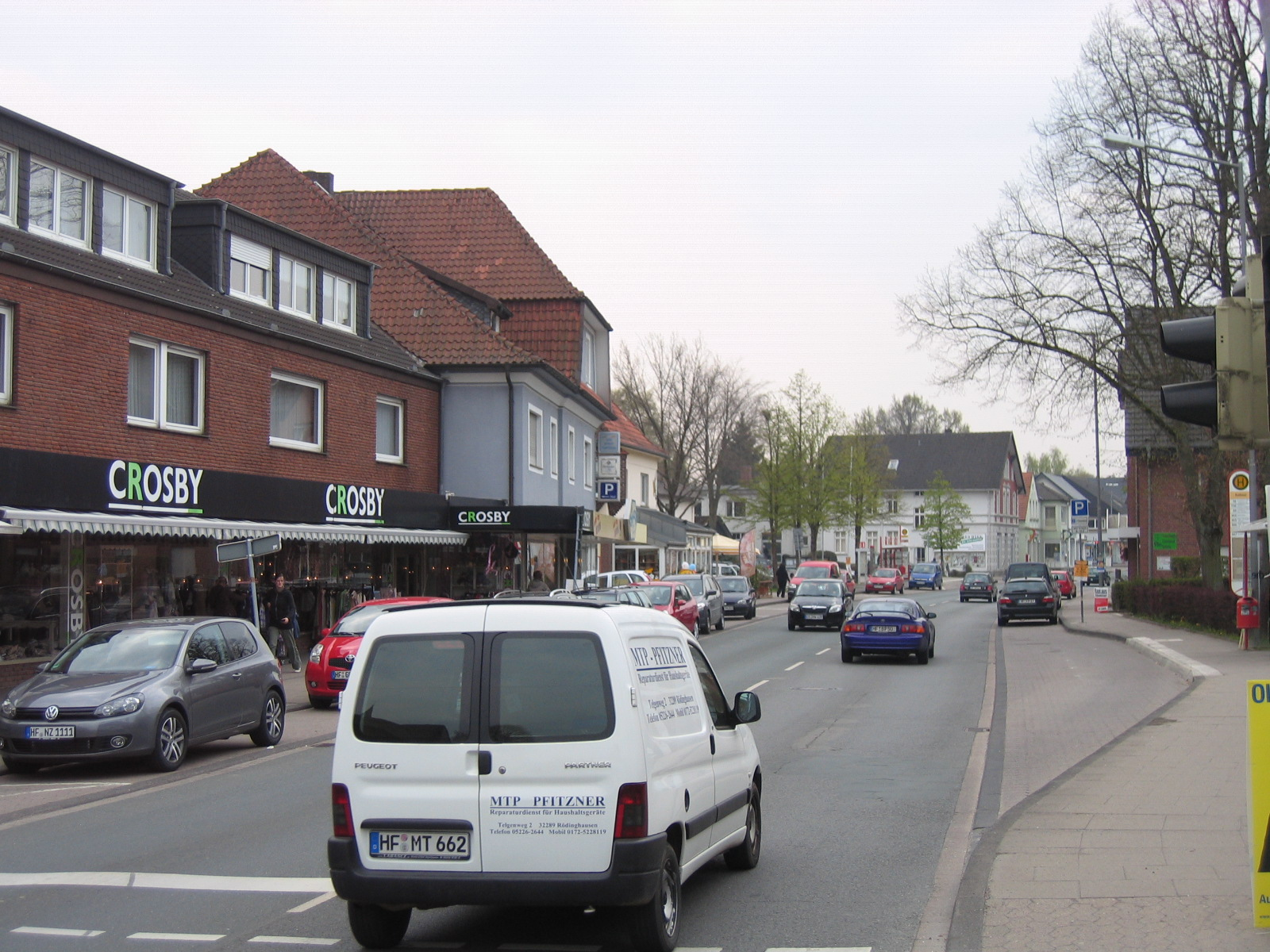

- Flag Coat of arms

- Location of Spenge within Herford district
- Interactive map of Spenge
- Location within Germany Location within North Rhine-Westphalia
- Coordinates: 52°08′N 08°29′E
- Country: Germany
- State: North Rhine-Westphalia
- Admin. region: Detmold
- District: Herford
- Subdivisions: 5

Government
  - Mayor (2020–25): Bernd Dumcke (SPD)

Area
  - Total: 40.35 km^{2} (15.58 sq mi)
- Elevation: 129 m (423 ft)

Population (2025-12-31)
  - Total: 14,596
  - Density: 361.7/km^{2} (936.9/sq mi)
- Time zone: UTC+01:00 (CET)
  - Summer (DST): UTC+02:00 (CEST)
- Postal codes: 32139
- Dialling codes: 05225; 05223 (northeast), 05428 (far west), 05206 (south, esp. Nagelsholz)
- Vehicle registration: HF
- Website: www.spenge.de

Spenge (German pronunciation: [ˈʃpɛŋə]) is a town in the district of Herford, in North Rhine-Westphalia, Germany

== Geography ==
Spenge is situated north of Bielefeld and west of Herford. It borders Lower Saxony in the west.

=== Subdivisions ===
Spenge consists of 5 subdivisions (population as of December 31, 2001):

- Bardüttingdorf (1,480 inhabitants)
- Hücker-Aschen (1,465 inhabitants)
- Lenzinghausen (2,793 inhabitants)
- Spenge (8,696 inhabitants)
- Wallenbrück (1,976 inhabitants)

=== Towns and local subdistricts ===
- Affhüpperhöfe
- Bardüttingdorf
- Baringdorf
- Blomeier Hof
- Bockhorst
- Bruning
- Detert-Kriese
- Diemke
- Düttingdorf
- Ellersiek
- Gehlenbrink
- Grafahrend
- Hannighorst
- Harrenheide
- Heistersiek
- Helligen
- Helliger Heide
- Hücker
- Hücker Dorf
- Hücker Kreuz
- Hücker-Aschen
- Hülsmann Hof
- Kisker
- Klein Aschen
- Klockenbrink
- Lenzinghausen
- Mantershagen
- Mark
- Martmühle
- Mühlenburg
- Nagelsholz
- Neuenfeld
- Nordspenge
- Placken
- Riepe
- Söttringhausen
- Spenger Heide
- Südholz
- Südspenge
- Vahrenhölzerhöfe
- Wallenbrück
- Werburg
- Westerhausen
- Wichlinghauserhöfe
- Wullbrede

== Population ==
Historical population

Year	Pop.	±% p.a.
1965	12,441	—
1970	12,836	+0.63%
1975	13,333	+0.76%
1980	13,766	+0.64%
1985	13,810	+0.06%
1990	14,977	+1.64%
1995	15,601	+0.82%

Year	Pop.	±% p.a.
2000	15,815	+0.27%
2005	15,490	−0.41%
2010	14,847	−0.84%
2015	14,768	−0.11%
2020	14,419	−0.48%
2025	14,596	+0.24%

Source: Landesdatabank Nordrhein-Westfalen

== Mayors of the town Spenge ==
- 1969–1984: Karl Obermann (UWG)
- 1984–1995: Karl-Heinz Wiegelmann (SPD)
- 1995–2009: Christian Manz (born 1954), (CDU)
- 2009–today: Bernd Dumcke (SPD)

== Notable places ==
- Lutheran Church of Sankt Martin built in the 13th Century, within the Altar of St. Martin, created around 1470.
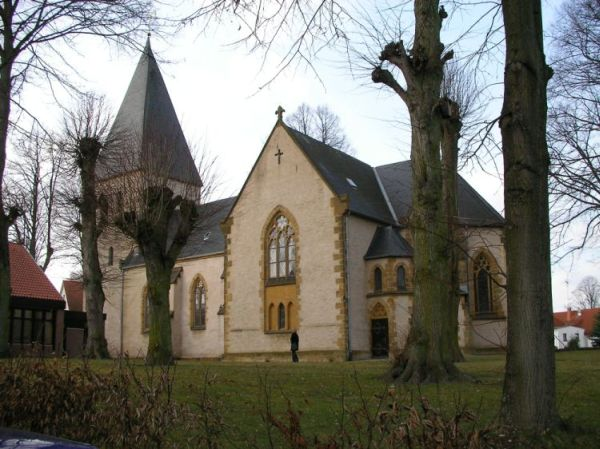
Lutheran Church of Sankt Martin in Spenge as of March 2006

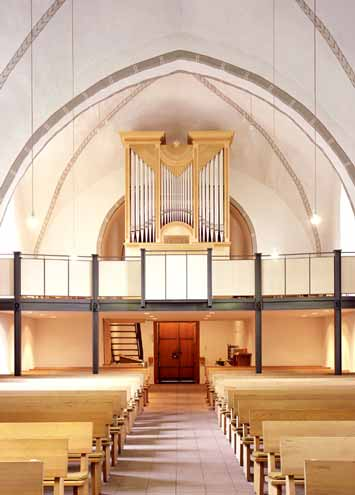
in 2005 rebuilt Wegscheider-Organ in the Church of Sankt Martin in Spenge as of March 2006
- Marienkirche in Wallenbrück built 1096, to the west of Spenge
- Mühlenburg Castle built in 1468.
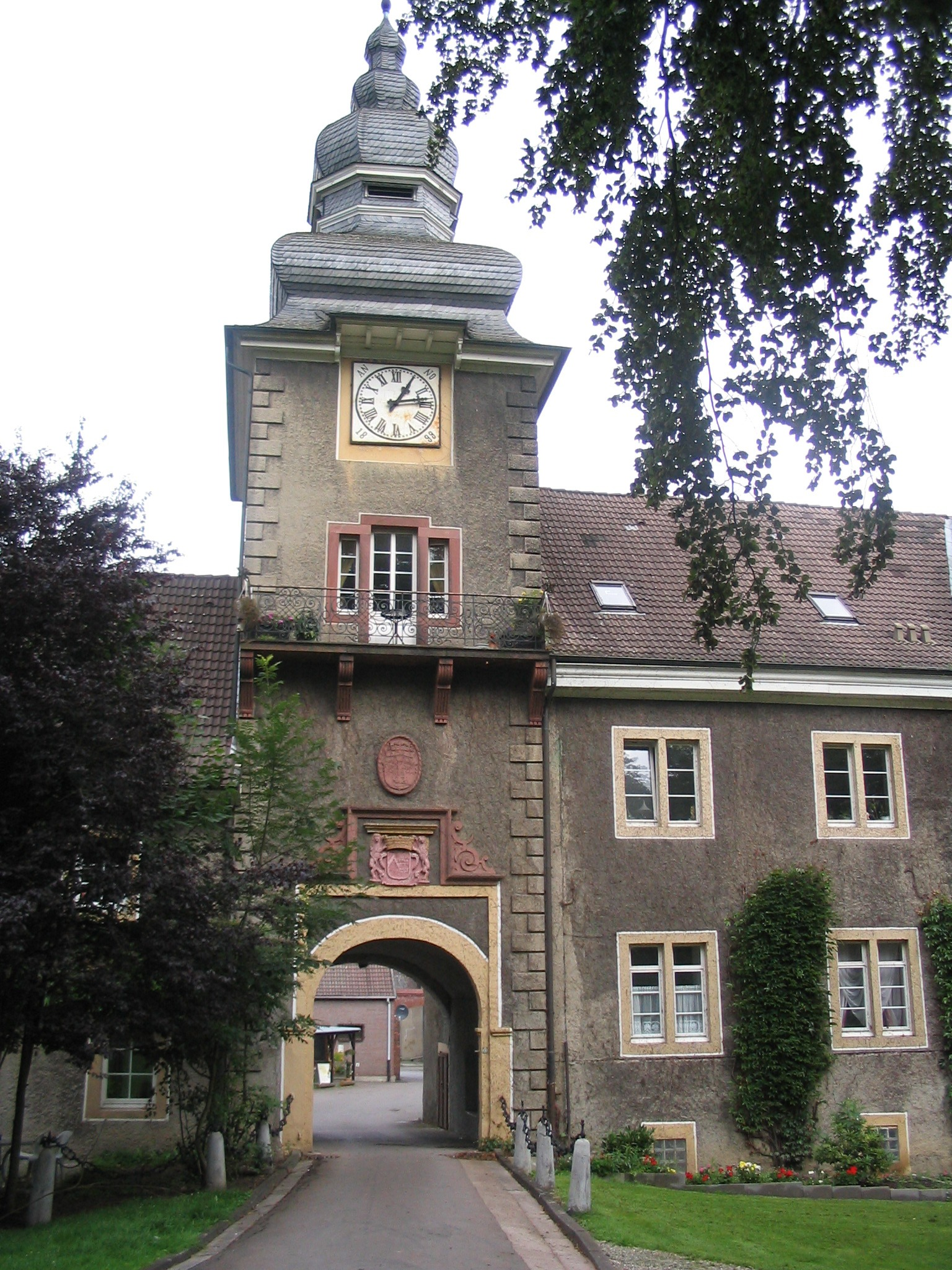
Gate to Schloss Mühlenburg in July 2004

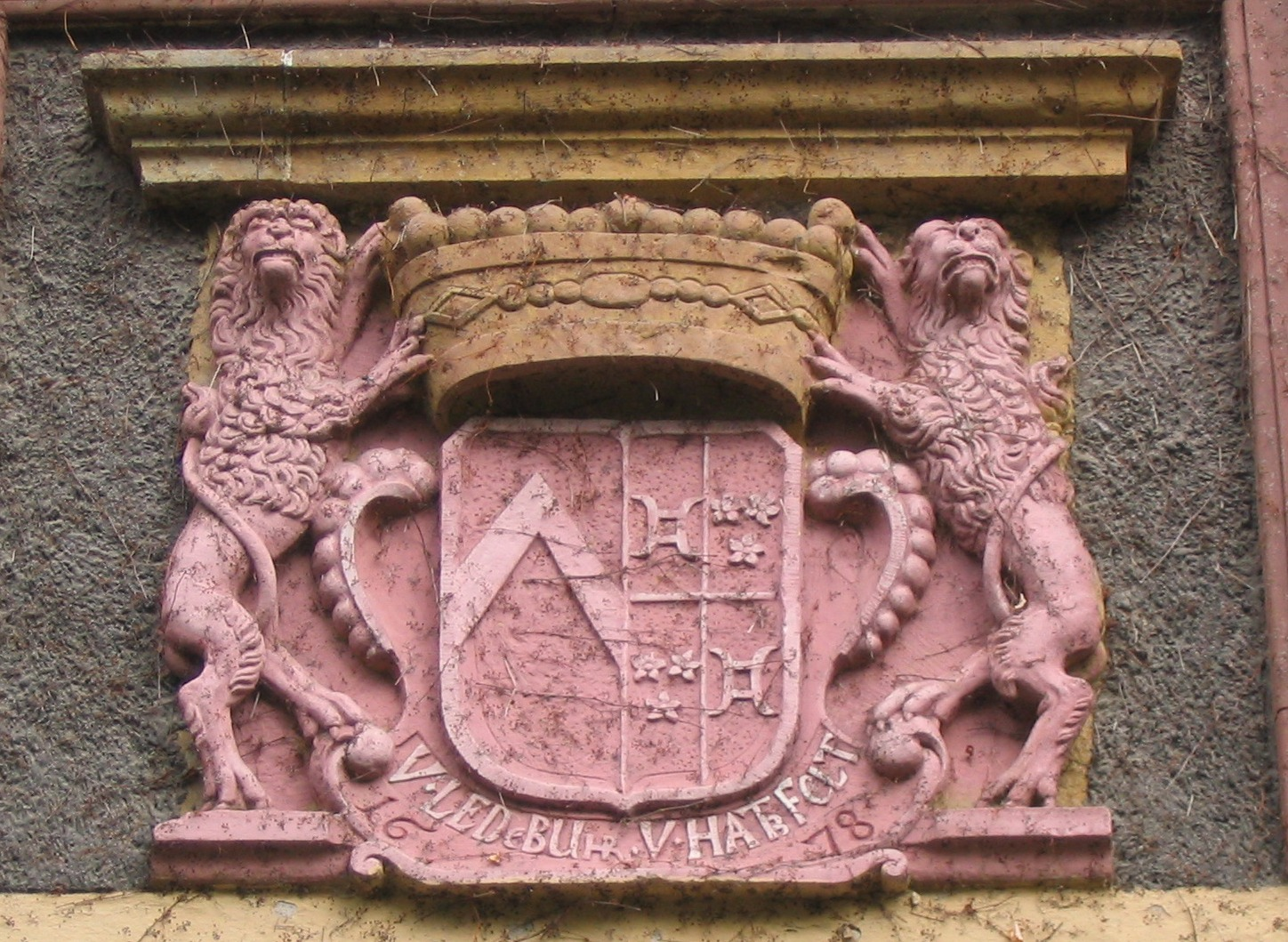
Coat of arms at gate to Schloss Mühlenburg

== Sons and daughters of the town ==
- Eberhard Werdin (1911–1991), composer and music pedagogue
- Friedrich-Wilhelm Graefe zu Baringdorf (born 1942), politician (Alliance '90 / The Greens), 1984–1987 and 1989–2009 Member of the European parliament
- A football fan has prominently displayed a banner with the town's name in white block capital letters on a black background, beside the pitch, at numerous major international tournaments in the 2010s and 2020s. At the 2024 European Championships, as of 24 June 2024, the Spenge flag had been seen at 10 of the tournament's total of 28 games. The banner has also been displayed at the 2014 World Cup, the 2016 European Championships and the 2022 World Cup.
