= Tannhäuser (opera) =

1845 opera by Richard Wagner

- Opera by Richard Wagner
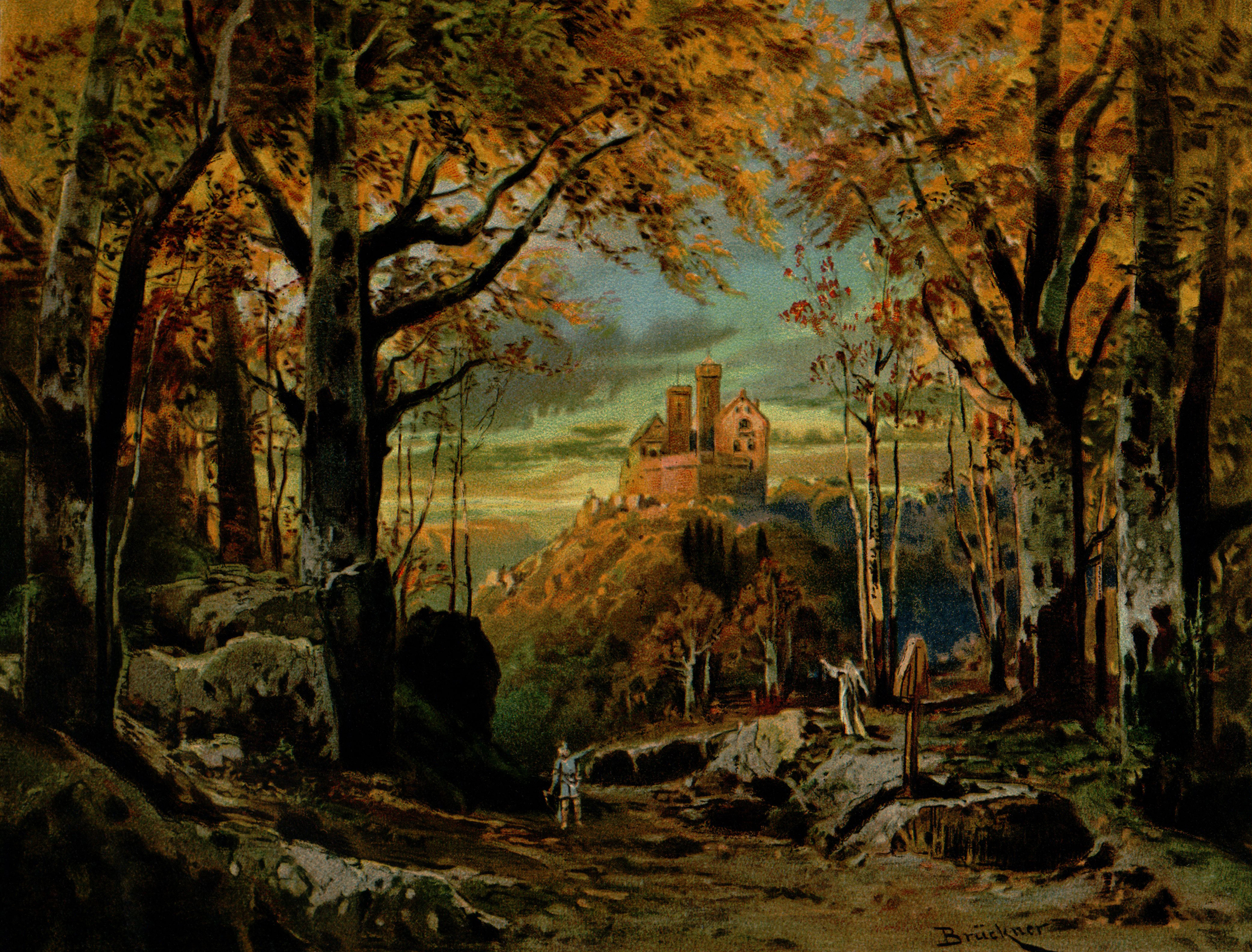
- Design for act 3 by Max and Otthold Brückner for Bayreuth
- Native title: Tannhäuser und der Sängerkrieg auf Wartburg
- Librettist: Richard Wagner
- Language: German
- Premiere: 19 October 1845; Königliches Hoftheater Dresden

Tannhäuser (German: [ˈtanhɔʏzɐ]; full title Tannhäuser und der Sängerkrieg auf Wartburg, "Tannhäuser and the Minnesängers' Contest at Wartburg") is an 1845 opera in three acts, with music and text by Richard Wagner (WWV 70 in the catalogue of the composer's works). It is based on two German legends: Tannhäuser, the mythologized medieval German Minnesänger and poet, and the tale of the Wartburg Song Contest. The story centres on the struggle between sacred and profane love, as well as redemption through love, a theme running through most of Wagner's work.

The opera remains a staple of major opera house repertoire in the 21st century.

== Composition history ==
=== Sources ===
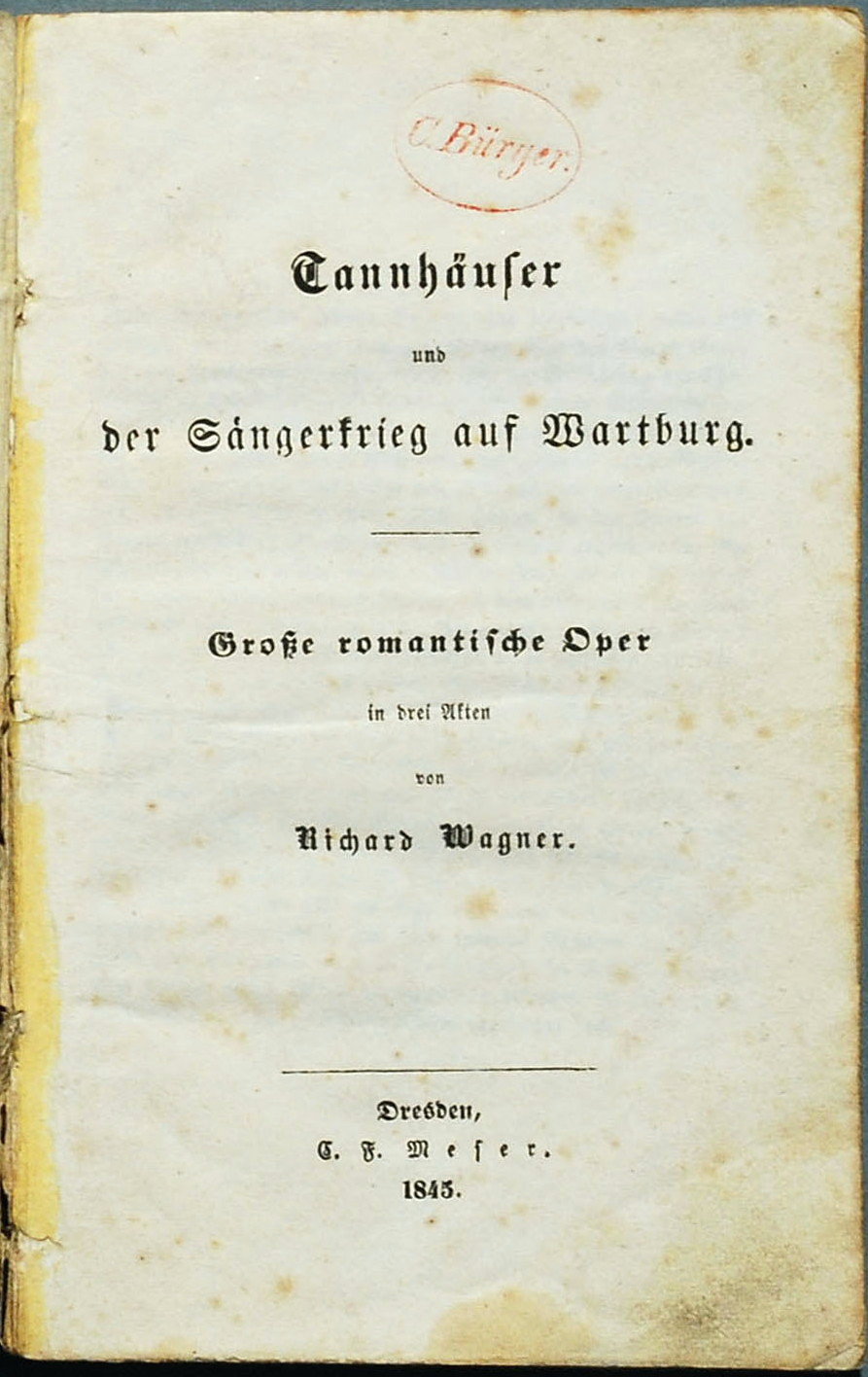
Libretto, Dresden 1845

The libretto of Tannhäuser combines mythological elements characteristic of German Romantische Oper (Romantic opera) and the medieval setting typical of many French Grand Operas. Wagner brings these two together by constructing a plot involving the 14th-century Minnesänger and the myth of Venus and her subterranean realm of Venusberg. Both the historical and the mythological are united in Tannhäuser's personality; although he is a historical poet-composer, little is known about him besides the myths surrounding him.

Wagner wove a variety of sources into the opera narrative. According to his autobiography, he was inspired by finding the story in "a Volksbuch (popular book) about the Venusberg", which he said "fell into his hands", although he admits knowing of the story from the Phantasus of Ludwig Tieck and E. T. A. Hoffmann's story, Der Kampf der Sänger (The Singers' Contest). Tieck's tale, which names the hero "Tannenhäuser", tells of the minnesinger-knight's amorous adventures in the Venusberg, his travels to Rome as a Pilgrim, and his repudiation by the pope. To this Wagner added material from Hoffmann's story, from Serapions-Brüder (1819), describing a song contest at the Wartburg castle, a castle which featured prominently in Thuringian history. Heinrich Heine had provided Wagner with the inspiration for Der fliegende Holländer and Wagner again drew on Heine for Tannhäuser. In Heine's sardonic essay "Elementargeister" (Elemental spirits), there appears a poem about Tannhäuser and the lure of the grotto of Venus, published in 1837 in the third volume of Der Salon. Other possible sources include Friedrich de la Motte Fouqué's play Der Sängerkrieg auf der Wartburg and Eichendorff's Das Marmorbild (The Marble Statue, 1818).

The legend of Tannhäuser, the amorous crusading Franconian knight, and that of the song contest on the Wartburg (which did not involve Tannhäuser, but the semi-mythical minnesinger Heinrich von Ofterdingen), came from quite separate traditions. Ludwig Bechstein wove together the two legends in the first volume of his collection of Thuringian legends, Der Sagenschatz und die Sagenkreise des Thüringerlandes (A treasury of the tales of Thuringian legends and legend cycles, 1835), which was probably the Volksbuch to which Wagner refers in his autobiography. Wagner also knew of the work of another contemporary, Christian Theodor Ludwig Lucas, whose Über den Krieg von Wartburg of 1838 also conflated the two legends. This confusion (which explains why Tannhäuser is referred to as 'Heinrich' in the opera) does not fit with the historical timeline of the events in the opera, since the Singers' Contest involving von Ofterdingen is said to have taken place around 1207, while Tannhäuser's poetry appeared much later (1245–1265). The sources used by Wagner, therefore, reflected a nineteenth-century romantic view of the medieval period, with concerns about artistic freedom and the constraints of organised religion typical of the period of Romanticism.

During Wagner's first stay in Paris (1839–1842), he read a paper by Ludwig Lucas on the Sängerkrieg which sparked his imagination, and encouraged him to return to Germany, which he reached on 7 April 1842. Having crossed the Rhine, the Wagners drove towards Thuringia, and saw the early rays of sun striking the Wartburg; Wagner immediately began to sketch the scenery that would become the stage sets. Wagner wrote the prose draft of Tannhäuser between June and July 1842 and the libretto in April 1843.

=== Composition ===
Wagner began composing the music during a vacation in Teplitz in the summer of 1843 and completed the full score on 13 April 1845; the opera's famous overture, often played separately as a concert piece, was written last. While composing the music for the Venusberg grotto, Wagner grew so impassioned that he made himself ill; in his autobiography, he wrote, "With much pain and toil I sketched the first outlines of my music for the Venusberg.... Meanwhile, I was very much troubled by excitability and rushes of blood to the brain. I imagined I was ill and lay for whole days in bed...." The instrumentation also shows signs of borrowing from French operatic style. The score includes parts for on-stage brass; however, Wagner uses 12 German Waldhorns rather than French brass instruments. Wagner also makes use of the harp, another commonplace of French opera. Wagner made a number of revisions to the opera throughout his life and was still dissatisfied with its format when he died. The most significant revision was made for the opera's première in Paris in 1861.

== Performance history ==
=== Dresden version (1845) ===
The first performance was given in the Königliches Hoftheater Dresden on 19 October 1845. The composer Ferdinand Hiller, at that time a friend of Wagner, assisted in the musical preparations for the production. The part of Elisabeth was sung by Wagner's niece, Johanna Wagner. Wagner had intended to premiere the opera on 13 October, Johanna's 19th birthday, but she was ill, so it was postponed by six days. Venus was sung by Wilhelmine Schröder-Devrient, and the title role of Tannhäuser by Josef Tichatschek. The performance was conducted by the composer. Tannhäuser was not the success that Rienzi had been, and Wagner almost immediately set to modifying the ending, adjusting the score through 1846 and 1847. For the first Dresden revival (1847) he clarified the representation of Venus's temptation of Tannhäuser in the final act and added vocal presentation of the pilgrim's chorus in this act (where it had previously been represented by orchestra alone). This version of the opera, as revised for publication in 1860, is generally known as the "Dresden" version. After Franz Liszt produced the opera at Weimar Court Theatre in 1849, there were further performances between 1852 and 1856 in (amongst other locations) Schwerin, Kassel, Poznań, Wiesbaden, Hanover, Munich, and Berlin.

The Dresden version was used for initial productions outside Germany, notably at Riga on 18 January 1853; at Tallinn on 10 January 1854; at Prague on 25 November 1854 at Theatre of the Estates; at New York City on 4 April 1859 at the Stadt Theatre; and in London on 6 May 1876 at the Royal Opera House, Covent Garden (when it was sung in Italian).

=== Paris version (1861) ===
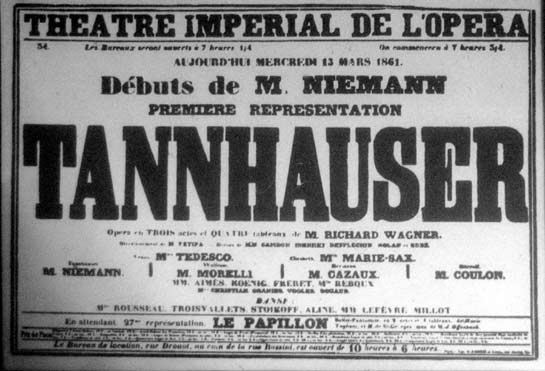
Poster for first Paris production of Wagner's opera Tannhäuser

Wagner substantially amended the opera for a special 1861 performance by the Paris Opéra. This had been requested by Emperor Napoleon III at the suggestion of Princess Pauline von Metternich, wife of the Austrian ambassador to France. This revision forms the basis of what is now known as the "Paris version" of Tannhäuser. The venue meant that the composer had to insert a ballet into the score, according to the traditions of the house. Wagner agreed to this condition since he believed that a success at the Opéra represented his most significant opportunity to re-establish himself following his exile from Germany. However, rather than put the ballet in its traditional place in act 2, he chose to place it in act 1, in the form of a bacchanale, where it could make dramatic sense by representing the sensual world of Venus's realm. There were further extensive changes. The text was translated into French (by Charles-Louis-Étienne Nuitter and others). Venus, a role that in the Dresden version was considered a soprano, was rewritten as for mezzo-soprano. Venus' aria "Geliebter, komm!" was transposed down by a semitone, and its latter part was completely rewritten. A solo for Walther was removed from act 2. Extra lines for Venus following Tannhäuser's "Hymn to Love" were added. The orchestral introduction to act 3 was shortened. The end of the opera was reworked to include Venus on stage, where before the audience only heard the Venus motif, in an attempt to clarify the action.

Tannhäuser's first performance in Paris was given on 13 March 1861 at the Salle Le Peletier of the Paris Opéra. The composer had been closely involved in its preparation and there had been 164 rehearsals. The costumes were designed by Alfred Albert, the sets by Charles-Antoine Cambon and Joseph Thierry (act 1, scene 1), Édouard Desplechin (act 1, scene 2 and act 3), and Joseph Nolau and Auguste Alfred Rubé (act 2).

At the first performance the opera was initially well-received, with disturbances including whistling and catcalls beginning to appear in act 2 and becoming prominent by the end of the third act. For the second performance much of the new ballet music was removed, together with some actions that had specifically provoked mockery, such as the piping of the shepherd in act 1. At this performance however the audience disturbances were increased. This was partly due to members of the wealthy and aristocratic Jockey Club, who objected to the ballet coming in act 1, since this meant they would have to be present from the beginning of the performance (disrupting their dining schedule). It was alleged that they distributed whistles to the audience. A further incentive to disruption was the unpopularity of Princess von Metternich and of her native country of Austria. At the third performance on 24 March (which Wagner did not attend) uproar caused several interruptions of up to fifteen minutes at a time. As a consequence, Wagner withdrew the opera after the third performance. This marked the end to Wagner's hopes of establishing himself in Paris.

The "Paris" version's Italian premiere, its first outside France, was 7 November 1872 at Teatro Comunale di Bologna. The American and British premieres of this version were respectively in New York at the Metropolitan Opera on 30 January 1889, and at London's Royal Opera House on 15 July 1895.

=== Vienna version (1875) ===
A few further changes to Tannhäuser were made for an 1875 performance of the opera in Vienna, the last production carried out under Wagner's own supervision. These included the opera being sung in German (rather than in French, as in Paris) and linking the end of the overture to the start of the opera proper. The 1875 Vienna version is that normally used in modern productions of the "Paris" version, often with the reinstatement of Walther's act 2 solo. Wagner remained dissatisfied with the opera. Cosima Wagner noted in her diary on 23 January 1883 (three weeks before he died) "He says he still owes the world Tannhäuser."

== Roles ==
Although the libretto and the score always use the single name Tannhäuser in stage directions involving the title character or in indicating which passages are sung by him, that name never appears in the libretto. Rather, each character who addresses Tannhäuser by name uses his given name, Heinrich (Heinrich von Ofterdingen).

The distinct character Heinrich der Schreiber sings many melodies distinct from all other named characters, and occasionally unique lyrics. However, in the libretto he finds individual mention only in the list of characters, with the ensemble numbers that include him being labelled for the Ritter (i.e., "knights", referring to the Minnesinger, who all share knightly rank). The score in the Schirmer edition labels his melody line simply "Schreiber".

Roles, voice types, premiere casts
Role	Voice type	Premiere cast, 19 October 1845 Conductor: Richard Wagner	Revised (Paris) version Premiere cast, 13 March 1861 Conductor: Pierre-Louis Dietsch
Tannhäuser, a Minnesinger, known as Heinrich	tenor	Josef Tichatschek	Albert Niemann
Princess Elisabeth, the Landgrave's niece	soprano	Johanna Wagner	Marie Sasse
Venus, Goddess of Love	soprano or mezzo-soprano	Wilhelmine Schröder-Devrient	Fortunata Tedesco
Wolfram von Eschenbach, a Minnesinger	baritone	Anton Mitterwurzer	Morelli
Hermann, Landgrave of Thuringia	bass	Georg Wilhelm Dettmer	Cazaux
Walther von der Vogelweide, a Minnesinger	tenor	Max Schloss	Aimes
Biterolf, a Minnesinger	bass	Johann Michael Wächter	Coulon
Heinrich der Schreiber, a Minnesinger	tenor	Anton Curty	König
Reinmar von Zweter, a Minnesinger	bass	Karl Risse	Freret
A young shepherd	soprano	Anna Thiele	Reboux
Four noble pages	soprano, alto		
Nobles, knights, ladies, pilgrims, sirens, naiads, nymphs, bacchants; In Paris version, also the Three Graces, youths, cupids, satyrs, and fauns

== Instrumentation ==
Tannhäuser is scored for the following instruments:

- 3 flutes (one doubles piccolo), 2 oboes, 2 clarinets, bass clarinet, 2 bassoons
- 4 horns, 3 trumpets, 3 trombones, bass tuba
- timpani, bass drum, cymbals, triangle, tambourine, castanets
- harp
- 1st and 2nd violins, violas, violoncellos, and double basses

off-stage

- cor anglais, 4 oboes, 6 clarinets, 4 bassoons, 12 horns, 12 trumpets, 4 trombones, snare drum, cymbals, tambourine

== Synopsis ==
=== Background ===
In Eisenach, Germany, in the early 13th century, the landgraves of the Thuringian Valley ruled the area of Germany around the Wartburg. They were great patrons of the arts, particularly music and poetry, holding contests between the Minnesingers at the Wartburg. Across the valley towered the Venusberg, in whose interior, according to legend, dwelt Holda, the Goddess of Spring. In time, Holda became identified with Venus, the pagan Goddess of Love, whose grotto was the home of sirens and nymphs. It was said that the goddess would lure the Wartburg minnesinger-knights to her lair where her beauty would captivate them. The minnesinger-knight Heinrich von Ofterdingen, known as Tannhäuser, left the court of the landgrave of Thuringia a year ago after a disagreement with his fellow knights. Since then, he has been held as a willing captive through his love for Venus, in her grotto in the Venusberg.

=== Act 1 ===
Overture: "Tannhäuser" by Richard Wagner, played by the New York Philharmonic Orchestra; Henry Hadley, Conducting (1926)

The Venusberg, (the Hörselberg of "Frau Holda" in Thuringia, in the vicinity of Eisenach), and a valley between the Venusberg and Wartburg

Overture

The substantial overture commences with the theme of the 'Pilgrim's Chorus' from act 3, scene 1, and also includes elements of the 'Venusberg' music from act 1, scene 1. The overture is frequently performed as a separate item in orchestral concerts, the first such performance having been given by Felix Mendelssohn conducting the Leipzig Gewandhaus Orchestra in February 1846. Wagner later gave the opinion that perhaps it would be better to cut the overture at opera performances to the Pilgrim's Chorus alone – "the remainder – in the fortunate event of its being understood – is, as a prelude to the drama, too much; in the opposite event, too little." In the original, "Dresden" version, the overture comes to a traditional concert close (the version heard in concert performances). For the "Paris" version the music leads directly into the first scene, without pausing.

Scene 1

Wagner's stage directions state: "The stage represents the interior of the Venusberg...In the distant background is a bluish lake; in it one sees the bathing figures of naiads; on its elevated banks are sirens. In the extreme left foreground lies Venus bearing the head of the half kneeling Tannhäuser in her lap. The whole cave is illuminated by rosy light. – A group of dancing nymphs appears, joined gradually by members of loving couples from the cave. – A train of Bacchantes comes from the background in wild dance... – The ever-wilder dance answers as in echo the Chorus of Sirens": "Naht euch dem Strande" (Come to the shore). In the Paris version, this orgiastic ballet is greatly extended.

Scene 2

Following the orgy of the ballet, Tannhäuser's desires are finally satiated, and he longs for freedom, spring and the sound of church bells. He takes up his harp and pays homage to the goddess in a passionate love song, "Dir töne Lob!" (Let your praises be heard), which he ends with an earnest plea to be allowed to depart, "Aus deinem Reiche, muss ich fliehn! O Königin! Göttin! Lass mich ziehn!" (From your kingdom must I flee! O Queen! O Goddess, set me free). Surprised, Venus offers him further charms, but eventually his repeated pleas arouse her fury and she curses his desire for salvation. (In the Paris version, Venus's inveighing against Tannhäuser is significantly expanded). Eventually Tannhäuser declares: "Mein Heil ruht in Maria" (My salvation rests in Mary). These words break the unholy spell. Venus and the Venusberg disappear.

Scene 3

According to Wagner's stage directions, "Tannhäuser...finds himself in a beautiful valley... To the left one sees the Hörselberg. To the right...a mountain path from the direction of the Wartburg ...; in the foreground, led to by a low promontory, an image of the Virgin Mary – From above left one hears the ringing of herder’s bells; on a high projection sits a young shepherd with pipes facing the valley". It is May. The shepherd sings an ode to the pagan goddess Holda, "Frau Holda kam aus dem Berg hervor" (Lady Holda, come forth from the hill). A hymn "Zu dir wall ich, mein Jesus Christ" (To thee I turn, my Jesus Christ) can be heard, as Pilgrims are seen approaching from the Wartburg, and the shepherd stops playing. The pilgrims pass Tannhäuser as he stands motionless, and then, praising God, ("Allmächt'ger, dir sei Preis!" (Almighty God, to you be praise!)) he sinks to his knees, overcome with gratitude. At that moment the sound of hunting-horns can be heard, drawing ever nearer.

Scene 4

The landgrave's hunting party appears. The minnesingers (Wolfram, Walther, Biterolf, Reinmar, and Heinrich) recognise Tannhäuser, still deep in prayer, and greet him ("Heinrich! Heinrich! Seh ich recht?" (Heinrich! Heinrich! Do I see right?)) cautiously, recalling past feuds. They question him about his recent whereabouts, to which he gives vague answers. The minnesingers urge Tannhäuser to rejoin them, which he declines until Wolfram mentions Elisabeth, the landgrave's niece, "Bleib bei Elisabeth!" (Stay, for Elisabeth!). Tannhäuser is visibly moved, "Elisabeth! O Macht des Himmels, rufst du den süssen Namen mir?" (Elisabeth! O might of heaven, do you cry out the sweet name to me?). The minnesingers explain to Tannhäuser how he had enchanted Elisabeth, but when he had left she withdrew from their company and lost interest in music, expressing the hope that his return will also bring her back, "Auf's Neue leuchte uns ihr Stern!" (Let her star once more shine upon us). Tannhäuser begs them to lead him to her, "Zu ihr! Zu ihr!" (To her! To her!). The rest of the hunting party gathers, blowing horns.

=== Act 2 ===
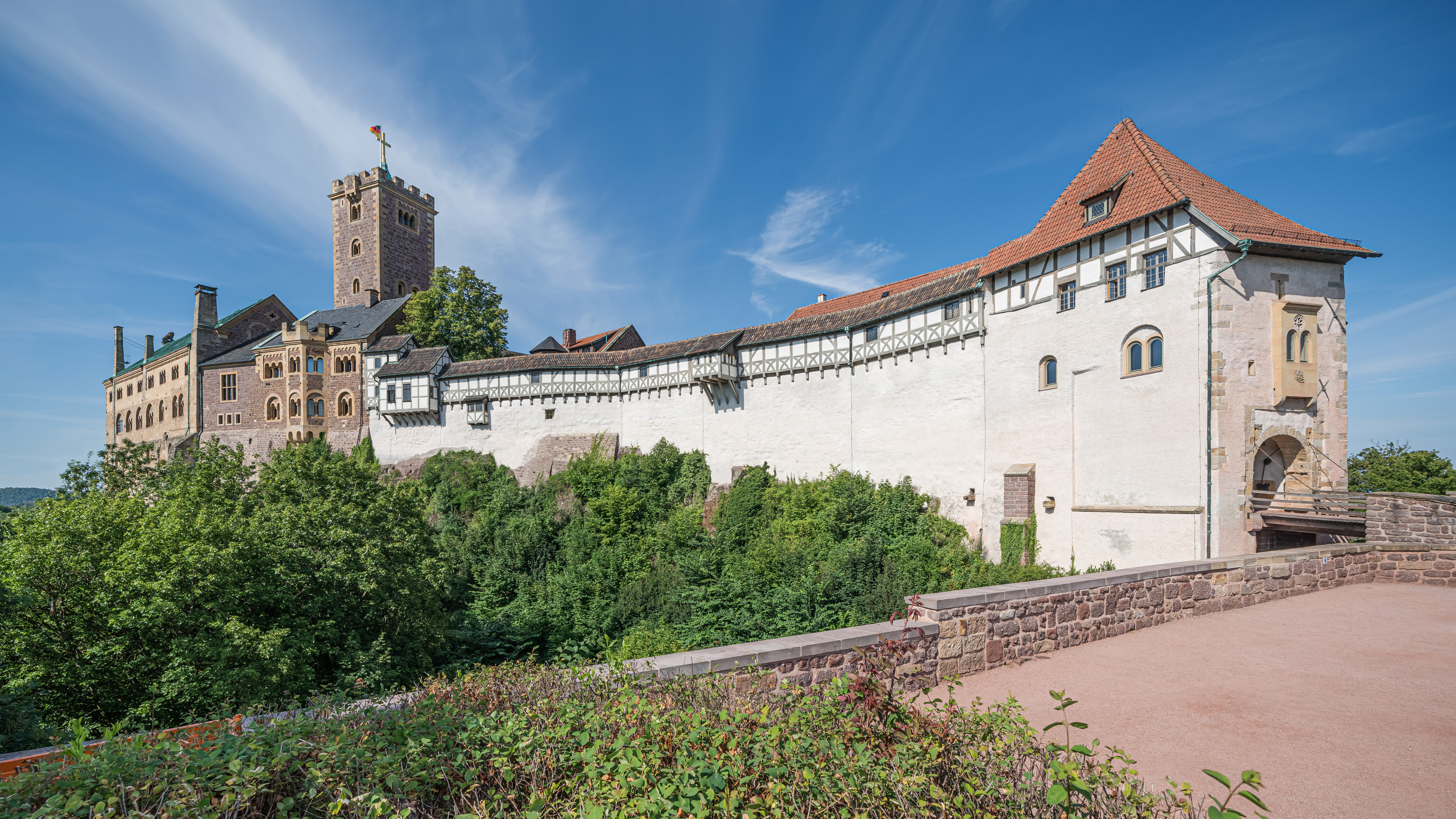
The Wartburg in Eisenach

The Minnesingers' Hall in the Wartburg castle

Prelude to act 2

Scene 1

Elisabeth enters, joyfully. She sings, to the hall, of how she has been beset by sadness since Tannhäuser's departure but now lives in hope that his songs will revive both of them, "Dich, teure Halle, grüss ich wieder" (Dear hall, I greet thee once again). Wolfram leads Tannhäuser into the hall.

Scene 2

Tannhäuser flings himself at Elisabeth's feet. He exclaims "O Fürstin!" (O Princess!). At first, seemingly confused, she questions him about where he has been, which he avoids answering. She then greets him joyfully ("Ich preise dieses Wunder aus meines Herzens Tiefe!" (I praise this miracle from my heart's depths!)), and they join in a duet, "Gepriesen sei die Stunde" (Praise be to this hour). Tannhäuser then leaves with Wolfram.

Scene 3

The landgrave enters, and he and Elisabeth embrace. The landgrave sings of his joy, "Dich treff ich hier in dieser Halle" (Do I find you in this hall) at her recovery and announces the upcoming song contest, at which she will preside, "dass du des Festes Fürstin seist" (that you will be the Princess of the Festival).

Scene 4 and Sängerkrieg (Song Contest)

Elisabeth and the landgrave watch the guests arrive. The guests assemble greeting the landgrave and singing "Freudig begrüssen wir die edle Halle" (With joy we greet the noble hall), take their places in a semicircle, with Elisabeth and the landgrave in the seats of honour in the foreground. The landgrave announces the contest and the theme, which shall be "Könnt ihr der Liebe Wesen mir ergründen?" (Can you explain the nature of Love?), and that the prize will be whatever the winner asks of Elisabeth. The knights place their names in a cup from which Elisabeth draws the first singer, Wolfram. Wolfram sings a song of courtly love and is applauded, but Tannhäuser chides him for his lack of passion. There is consternation, and once again Elisabeth appears confused, torn between rapture and anxiety. Biterolf accuses him of blasphemy and speaks of "Frauenehr und hohe Tugend" (women's virtue and honour). The knights draw their swords as Tannhäuser mocks Biterolf, but the landgrave intervenes to restore order. However, Tannhäuser, as if in a trance, rises to his feet and sings a song of ecstatic love to Venus, "Dir Göttin der Liebe, soll mein Lied ertönen" (To thee, Goddess of Love, should my song resound). There is general horror as it is realised he has been in the Venusberg; the women, apart from Elisabeth, flee. She appears pale and shocked, while the knights and the landgrave gather together and condemn Tannhäuser to death. Only Elisabeth, shielding him with her body, saves him, "Haltet ein!" (Stop!). She states that God's will is that a sinner shall achieve salvation through atonement. Tannhäuser collapses as all hail Elisabeth as an angel, "Ein Engel stieg aus lichtem Äther" (An angel rose out of the bright ether). He promises to seek atonement, the landgrave exiles him and orders him to join another younger band of pilgrims then assembling. All depart, crying "Nach Rom!" (To Rome!).

=== Act 3 ===
The valley of the Wartburg, in autumn. Elisabeth is kneeling, praying before the Virgin as Wolfram comes down the path and notices her

Prelude to act 3 – "Tannhäusers Pilgerfahrt" (Tannhäuser's Pilgrimage)

Scene 1

Orchestral music describes the pilgrimage of Tannhäuser. It is evening. Wolfram muses on Elisabeth's sorrow during Tannhäuser's second absence, "Wohl wusst' ich hier sie im Gebet zu finden" (I knew well I might find her here in prayer) and her longing for the return of the pilgrims, and expresses concerns that he may not have been absolved. As he does so he hears a pilgrims' prayer in the distance, "Beglückt darf nun dich, O Heimat, ich schauen" (Joyfully may I now you, O homeland, behold). Elisabeth rises and she and Wolfram listen to the hymn, watching the pilgrims approach and pass by. She anxiously searches the procession, but in vain, realising sorrowfully Tannhäuser is not amongst them, "Er kehret nicht züruck!" (He has not returned). She again kneels with a prayer to the Virgin that appears to foretell her death, "Allmächt'ge Jungfrau! Hör mein Flehen" (Almighty Virgin, hear my plea!). On rising she sees Wolfram but motions him not to speak. He offers to escort her back to the Wartburg, but she again motions him to be still, and gestures that she is grateful for his devotion, but her path leads to heaven. She slowly makes her way up the path alone.

Scene 2

Wolfram, left alone as darkness draws on and the stars appear, begins to play and sings a hymn to the evening star that also hints at Elisabeth's approaching death ("Wie Todesahnung Dämmrung deckt die Lande ... O du mein holder Abendstern"; Like a premonition of death the twilight shrouds the earth ... O thou my fair evening star).

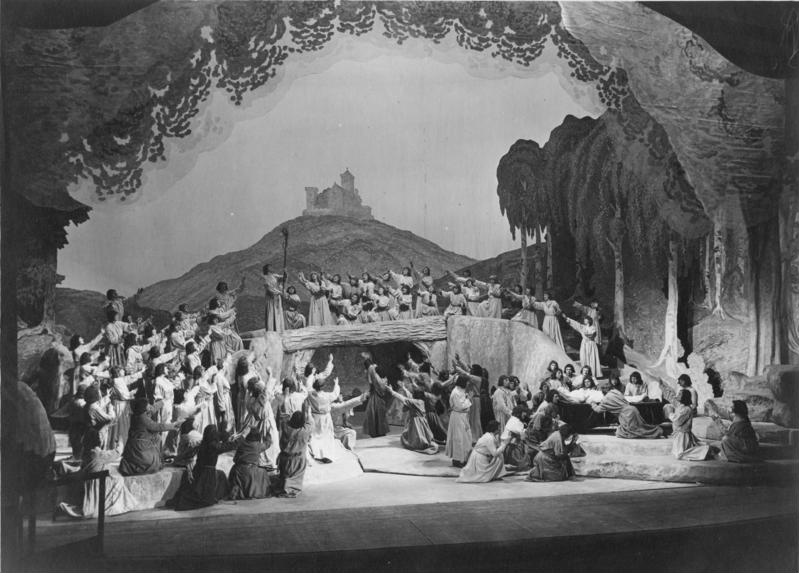
Final scene, Bayreuth Festival 1930

Scene 3

It is now night. Tannhäuser appears, ragged, pale and haggard, walking feebly leaning on his staff. Wolfram suddenly recognises Tannhäuser and, startled, challenges him, since he is exiled. To Wolfram's horror, Tannhäuser explains he is once again seeking the company of Venus. Wolfram tries to restrain him, at the same time expressing compassion and begging him to tell the story of his pilgrimage. Tannhäuser urges Wolfram to listen to his story, "Nun denn, hör an! Du, Wolfram, du sollst es erfahren" (Now then, listen! You, Wolfram, shall learn all that has passed). Tannhäuser sings of his penitence and suffering, all the time thinking of Elisabeth's gesture and pain, "Inbrunst im Herzen, wie kein Büsser noch" (With a flame in my heart, such as no penitent has known). He explains how he reached Rome, and the "Heiligtumes Schwelle" (Holy shrine), and witnessed thousands of pilgrims being absolved. Finally, he approaches "ihn, durch den sich Gott verkündigt" (he, through whom God speaks) (Note: Although not specifically mentioned, this is Pope Urban IV.) and tells his story. However, rather than finding absolution, he is cursed, "bist nun ewig du verdammt!" (you are forever damned!) and is told by the pope that "Wie dieser Stab in meiner Hand, nie mehr sich schmückt mit frischem Grün, kann aus der Hölle heissem Brand, Erlösung nimmer dir erblühn!" (As this staff in my hand, no more shall bear fresh leaves, from the hot fires of hell, salvation never shall bloom for thee). Whereupon, absolutely crushed, he fled, seeking his former source of bliss.

Having completed his tale, Tannhäuser calls out to Venus to take him back, "Zu dir, Frau Venus, kehr ich wieder" (To you, Lady Venus, I return). The two men struggle as a faint image of dancing becomes apparent. As Tannhäuser repeatedly calls on Venus, she suddenly appears and welcomes him back, "Willkommen, ungetreuer Mann!" (Welcome, faithless man!). As Venus continues to beckon, "Zu mir! Zu mir!" (To me! To me!), in desperation, Wolfram suddenly remembers there is one word that can change Tannhäuser's heart and exclaims "Elisabeth!" Tannhäuser, as if frozen in time, repeats the name. As he does so, torches are seen, and a funeral hymn is heard approaching, "Der Seele Heil, die nun entflohn" (Hail, the soul that now is flown). Wolfram realises it must be Elisabeth's body that is being borne, and that in her death lies Tannhäuser's redemption, "Heinrich, du bist erlöst!" (Heinrich, you are saved). Venus cries out, "Weh! Mir verloren" (Woe! Lost to me!) and vanishes with her kingdom. As dawn breaks the procession appears bearing Elisabeth's body on a bier. Wolfram beckons to them to set it down, and as Tannhäuser bends over the body uttering, "Heilige Elisabeth, bete für mich!" (Holy Elisabeth, pray for me!) he dies. As the growing light bathes the scene the younger pilgrims arrive bearing the pope's staff sprouting new leaves, and proclaiming a miracle, "Heil! Heil! Der Gnade Wunder Heil!" (Hail!, Hail! To this miracle of grace, Hail!). All then sing "Der Gnade Heil ist dem Büßer beschieden, er geht nun ein in der Seligen Frieden!" (The Holy Grace of God is to the penitent given, who now enters into the joy of Heaven!).

== After Wagner ==
=== Productions ===
Wagner died in 1883. The first production of the opera at Wagner's Bayreuth Festspielhaus (originally constructed for the performance of his Ring Cycle), was undertaken under the supervision of Cosima Wagner in 1891, and adhered closely to the 'Vienna' version. Later performances at Bayreuth included one conducted by Richard Strauss (1894), and one where the Bacchanal was choreographed by Isadora Duncan (1904). Duncan envisaged the Bacchanal as a fantasy of Tannhäuser's fevered brain, as Wagner had written to Mathilde Wesendonck in 1860. Arturo Toscanini conducted the opera at Bayreuth in the 1930/31 season.

In the words of the Wagner scholar Thomas S. Grey, "The Bacchanal remained a defining focus of many ...productions, as a proving ground for changing conceptions of the psychosexual symbolism of the Venusberg." Productions including those of Götz Friedrich at Bayreuth (1972) and Otto Schenk at the Metropolitan Opera, New York, (1977) "routinely offer quantities of simulated copulation and post-coital langour, for which the Paris score offers ample encouragement". A Munich production (1994) included as part of Tannhäuser's fantasies "creatures out of Hieronymus Bosch crawl[ing] around the oblivious protagonist".

A production mounted in 2013 at the Deutsche Oper am Rhein, Düsseldorf, was withdrawn after angry protests and reports of distressed audience members seeking medical help. Directed by Burkhard C. Kosminski, the production incorporated characters dressed as Nazis; a realistic depiction of a death by shooting; and a setting within a Holocaust-era concentration camp. After the first night, the opera's run continued in the form of unstaged concert performances only.

=== Literature ===
Many scholars and writers on opera have advanced theories to explain the motives and behaviour of the characters, including Jungian psychoanalysis, in particular as regards Tannhäuser's apparently self-destructive behaviour. In 2014 an analysis suggested that his apparently inconsistent behaviour, when analysed by game theory, is actually consistent with a redemption strategy. Only by public disclosure can Tannhäuser force a resolution of his inner conflict.
