= Königliches Hoftheater Dresden =

German opera house

Coordinates: 51°3′16.23″N 13°44′6.61″E

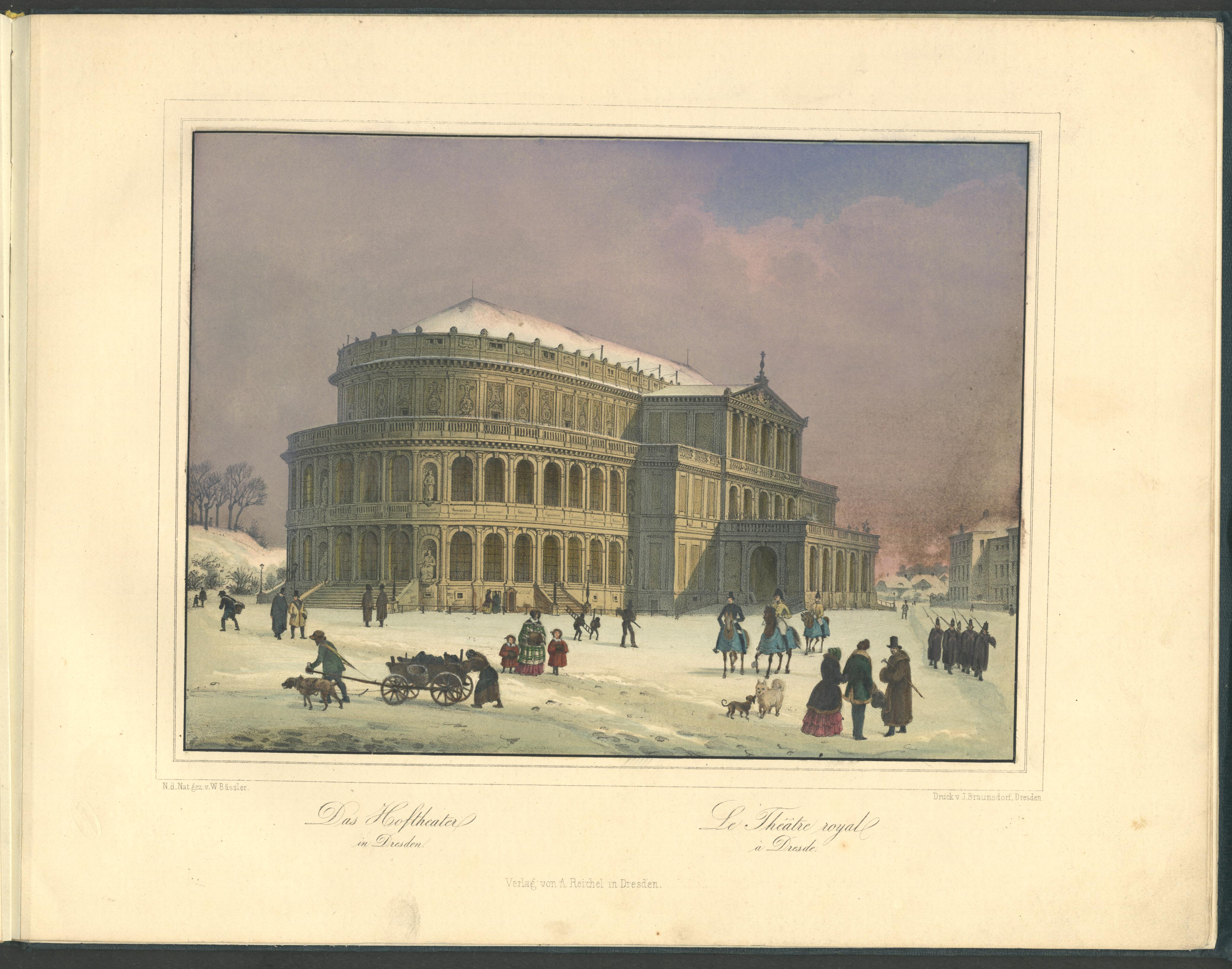
Gottfried Sempers' first Hoftheater

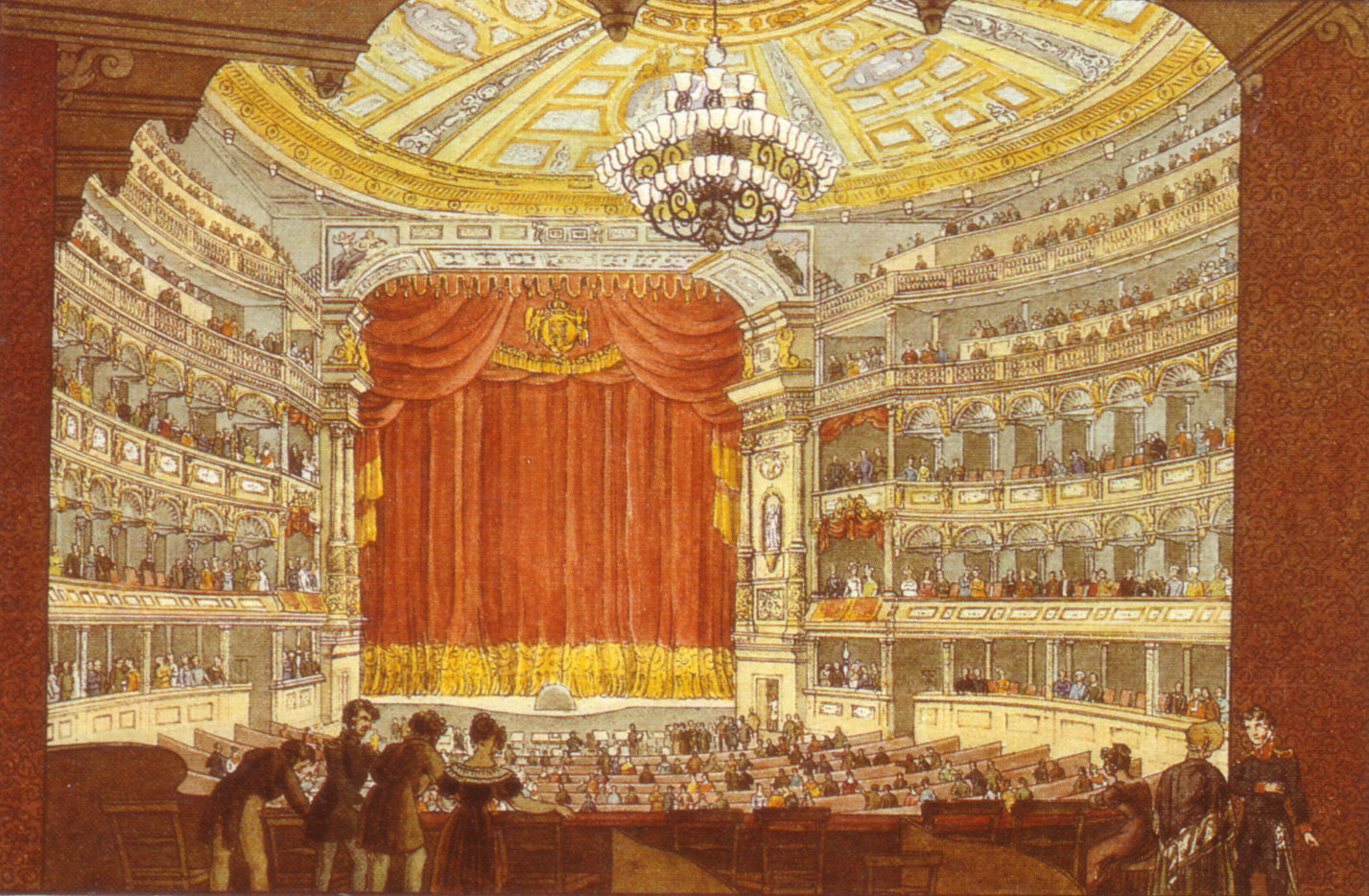
J. C. A. Richter: Sempers' Hoftheater

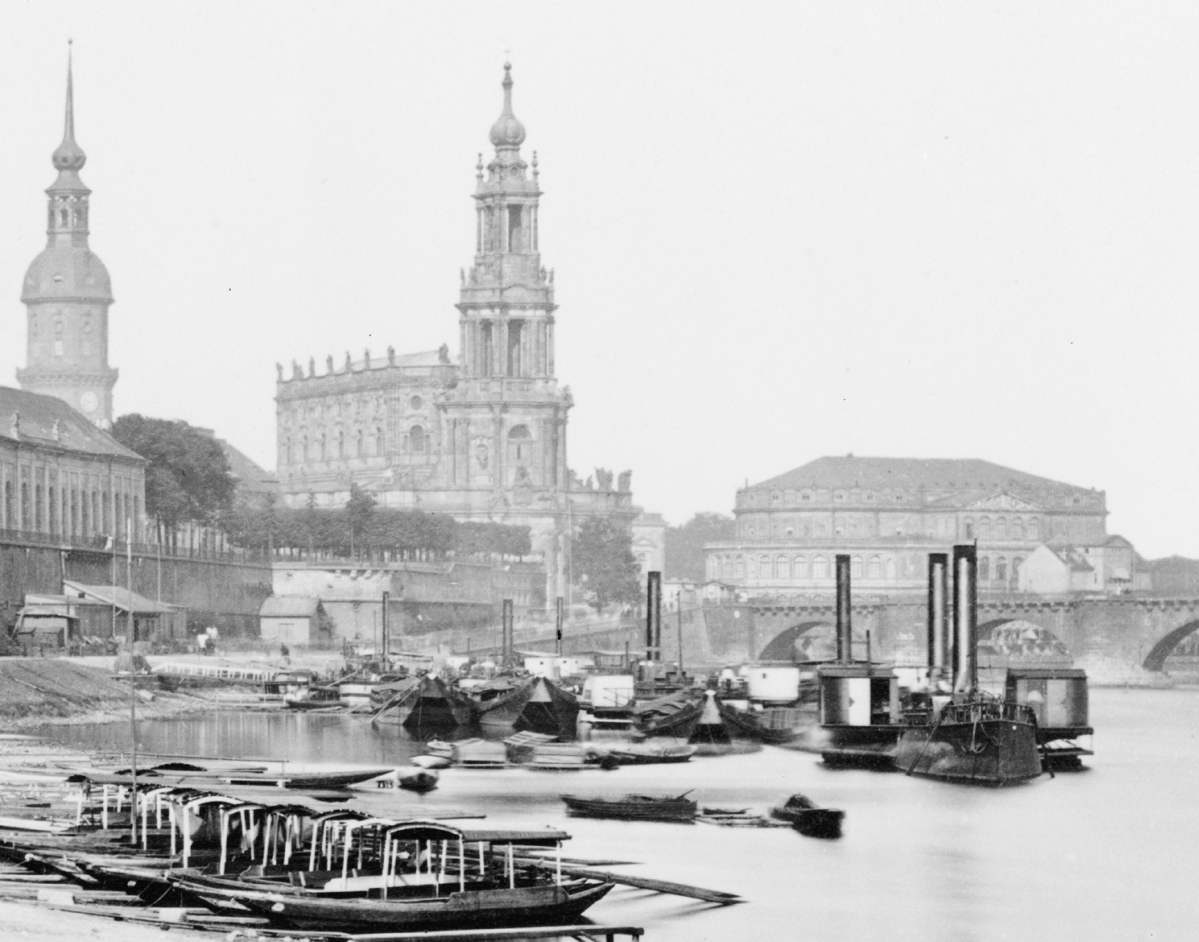
View of the Brühl's Terrace around 1865, from left to right: Brühlsche Galerie, Hausmannsturm, Brühlsche Bibliothek (covert), Dresden Cathedral, Semper Gallery (covered), Königliches Hoftheater, before that the old Augustus Bridge.

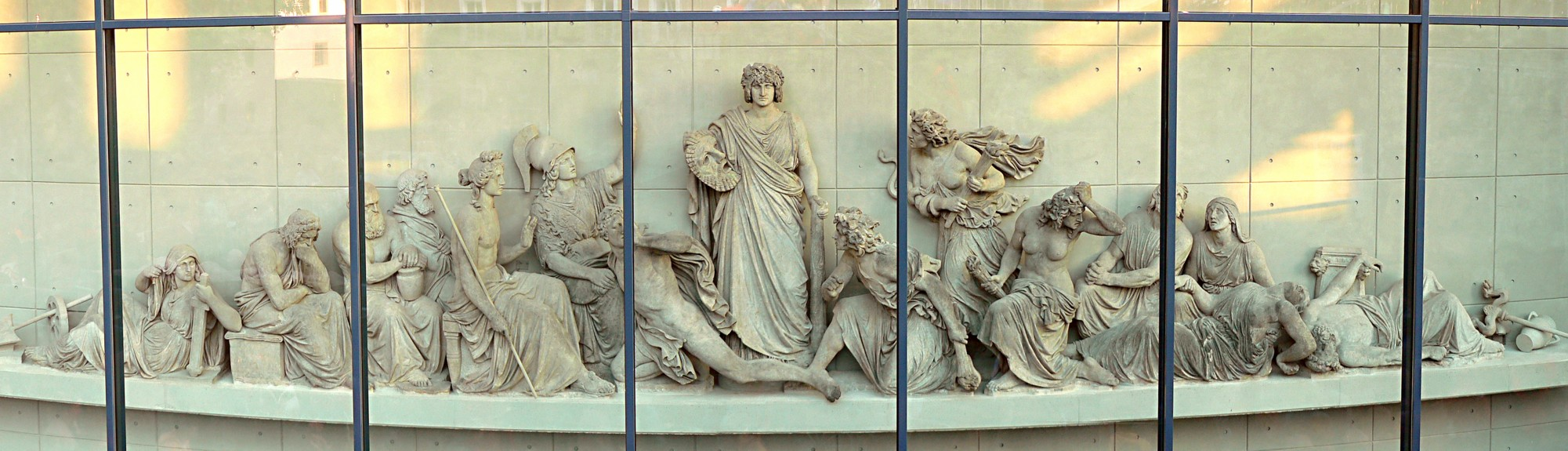
The Rietschelgiebel was part of the facade decoration of the court theatre and remained on the Ortenburg in Bautzen

The Königliches Hoftheater (Royal Court Theatre) in Dresden, Saxony, was a theatre for opera and drama in the royal seat of the Kingdom of Saxony from 1841 and 1869, designed by Gottfried Semper. It was the predecessor of today's Semperoper, and is therefore sometimes called Altes Hoftheater (Old Court Theatre).

== History ==
From 1838 to 1841, the architect Gottfried Semper built a representative opera house, which replaced the previous Morettisches Opernhaus. He took the forum plan devised by Matthäus Daniel Pöppelmann as the basis for his well thought-out urban planning solution. The opening took place on 12 April 1841 with Carl Maria von Weber's Jubelouvertüre and Goethe's Torquato Tasso.

The circular building in the forms of the Italian early Renaissance was praised as one of the most beautiful European theatres. Semper's first theatre building was considerably closer to the castle than his second opera house, which still exists today; the forerunner of today's Theaterplatz was laid out in front of the opera in 1840.

In the following years, Richard Wagner was Kapellmeister there, and gave the world premieres of several of his music dramas: Rienzi, Der fliegende Holländer and Tannhäuser, with singers including Wilhelmine Schröder-Devrient and Joseph Tichatschek.

In 1838, the respected Dresden clockmaker Friedrich Gutkaes was commissioned to construct a clock that could be easily read from all seats. This clock from the Kunstuhrenfabrik Gutkaes is today one of the most historically significant of its kind.

On 21 September 1869, the theatre building was completely destroyed in a fire due to carelessness during repair work. After the catastrophe, performances continued for a few years in an interim theatre, the so-called "Bretterbude". Meanwhile, Semper was working on new building plans for the second theatre, today's Semperoper.

The Dresden court councillor Wilhelm Lesky built his Villa estate in Kötzschenbroda on the remains of the burnt-down first Semper's Opera House as a picturesque arrangement of ruins. These spolias are no longer preserved today. In contrast, the so-called Rietschelgiebel, which can be seen today at the Burgtheater on the Ortenburg in Bautzen, has been preserved. This group of figures created by Ernst Rietschel with the title "Allegory of Tragedy" was originally installed on the north wall of the Dresden Court Theatre, but had no longer found a use when the opera house was rebuilt.

== Hofkapellmeister ==
Important conductors worked at the Königliches Hoftheater:

- Carl Gottlieb Reißiger (1798–1859)
- Richard Wagner (1813–1883)
- Ernst von Schuch (1846–1914)

== Singers ==
- Ludwig Schnorr von Carolsfeld
- Malvina Schnorr von Carolsfeld
- Georg Fritz Weiß

== Premieres held in the house ==
- Richard Wagner: Rienzi, 20 October 1842
- Heinrich Marschner: Kaiser Adolph von Nassau, 5 January 1845
- Richard Wagner: Der fliegende Holländer, 2 January 1843
- Richard Wagner: Tannhäuser, 19 October 1845
- Carl Gottlieb Reißiger: Der Schiffbruch der Medusa, 16 August 1846
- Anton Rubinstein: Feramors, 24 February 1863

== At the inauguration, 1841 ==
Ida von Lüttichau, wife of the general director Wolf Adolf August von Lüttichau, reported in a letter:

- The theatre can no longer be called beautiful, but perfect: it is not only splendour, taste, charm, but a total impression of something artistically magnificent, perfect, sublime: so that every detail belongs to the whole, such harmony in all parts, such complete interpenetration of painting, architecture, ornamentation of every kind, that nothing can be singled out. The sound, too, is as moderate and subdued as it is melodious, and I have never encountered such a correct measure of sound; the illumination, too, is very brilliant, but so distributed that the highest splendour of the decorations does not stand alone or appear dazzling. If it is this perfection of the exterior which, in a certain sense, leaves no room for the spiritual art of the play and pushes it to the ground, I have never seen a work so dead as Tasso on this evening. The setting is, I believe, too grand for the play; for the opera, these spaces are more suitable and fill them with the masses, instead of the individual artist seldom reaching the heights of his cothurn through the power of his genius, and everything that does not completely harmonise with this work of art immediately falls to the ground; that the most favourable influence of all circumstances had to come together to produce this unity has something wonderful about it. A gifted genius, like Semper, whose conception is the great whole: practical, experienced painters, like the French, a poetic painter, like Hübner, a mechanical talent, like Blochmann, and a fine, noble sense of beauty, like that of my husband (combined with an iron energy and strength of will), which is based not only in the intellectual, but also in a sense of order, and in symmetry and harmony, all this had to unite in order to give the whole precisely this form, so that it can probably be called the most brilliant that our present time has to offer. You can imagine that this theatre question was almost ecclesiastical for me, and such an uplifting mood can only have a beneficial effect. Lüttichau was, as always, noble and simple when it came to great suffering and joy.
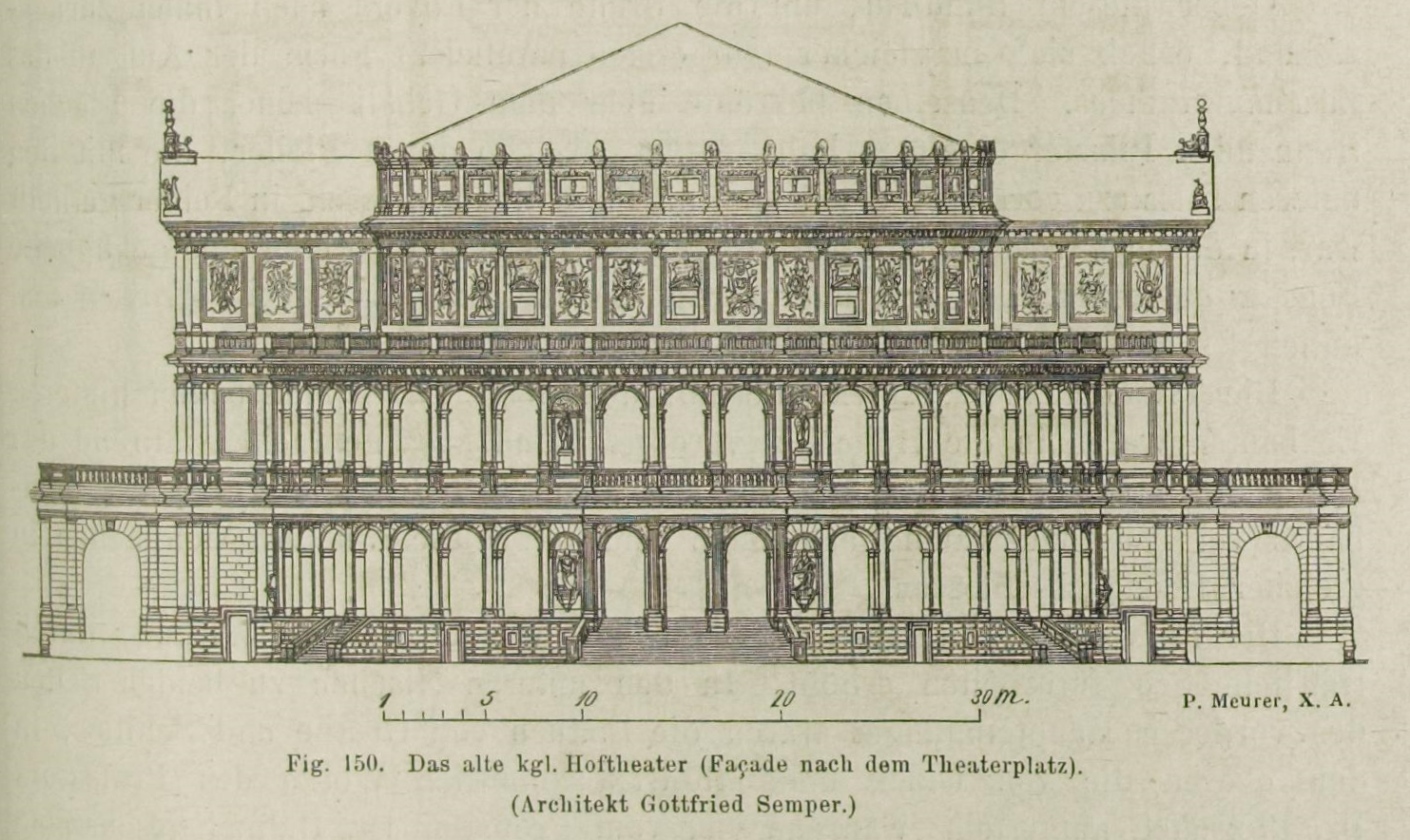
Façade after the Theaterplatz

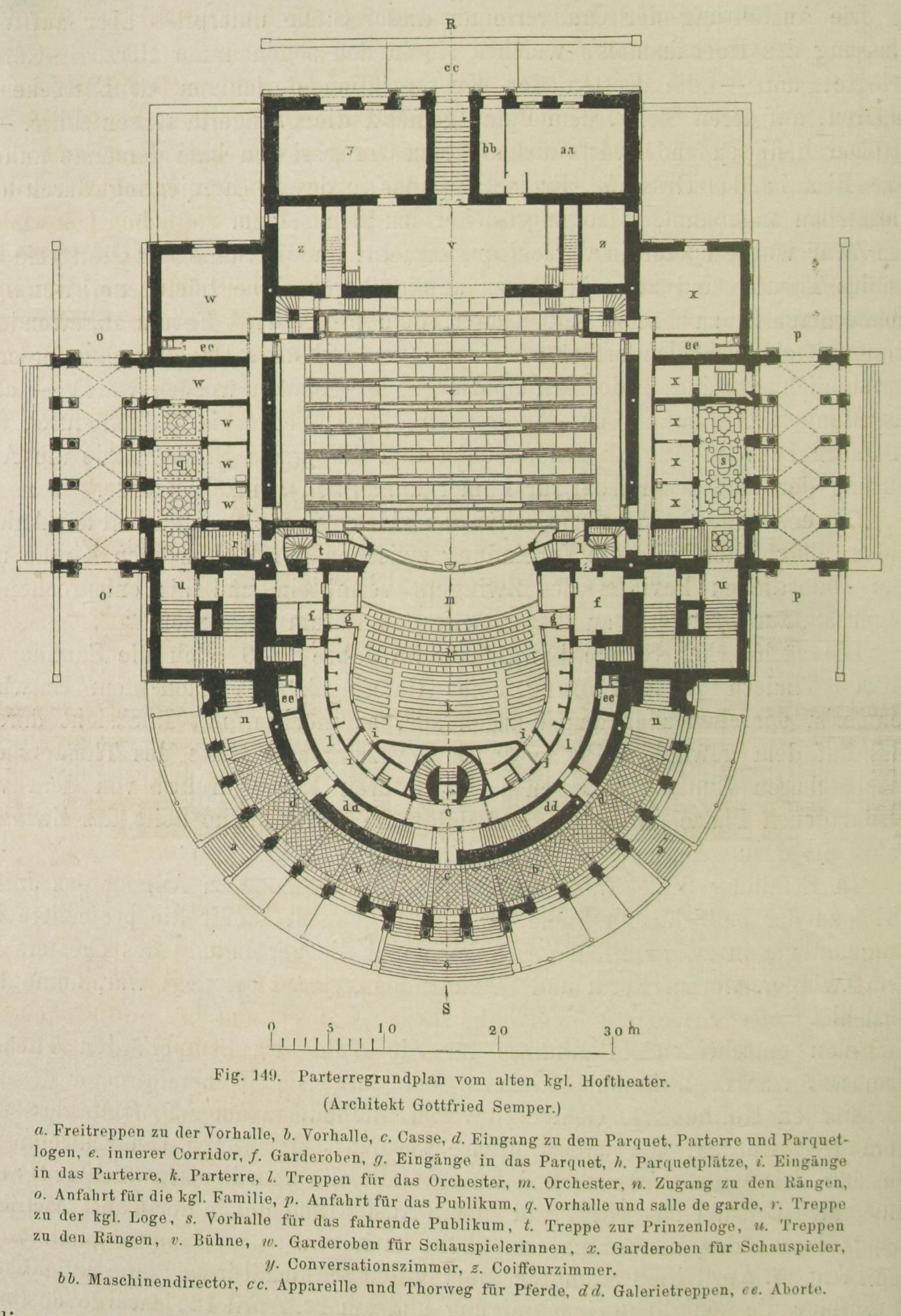
Floor plan

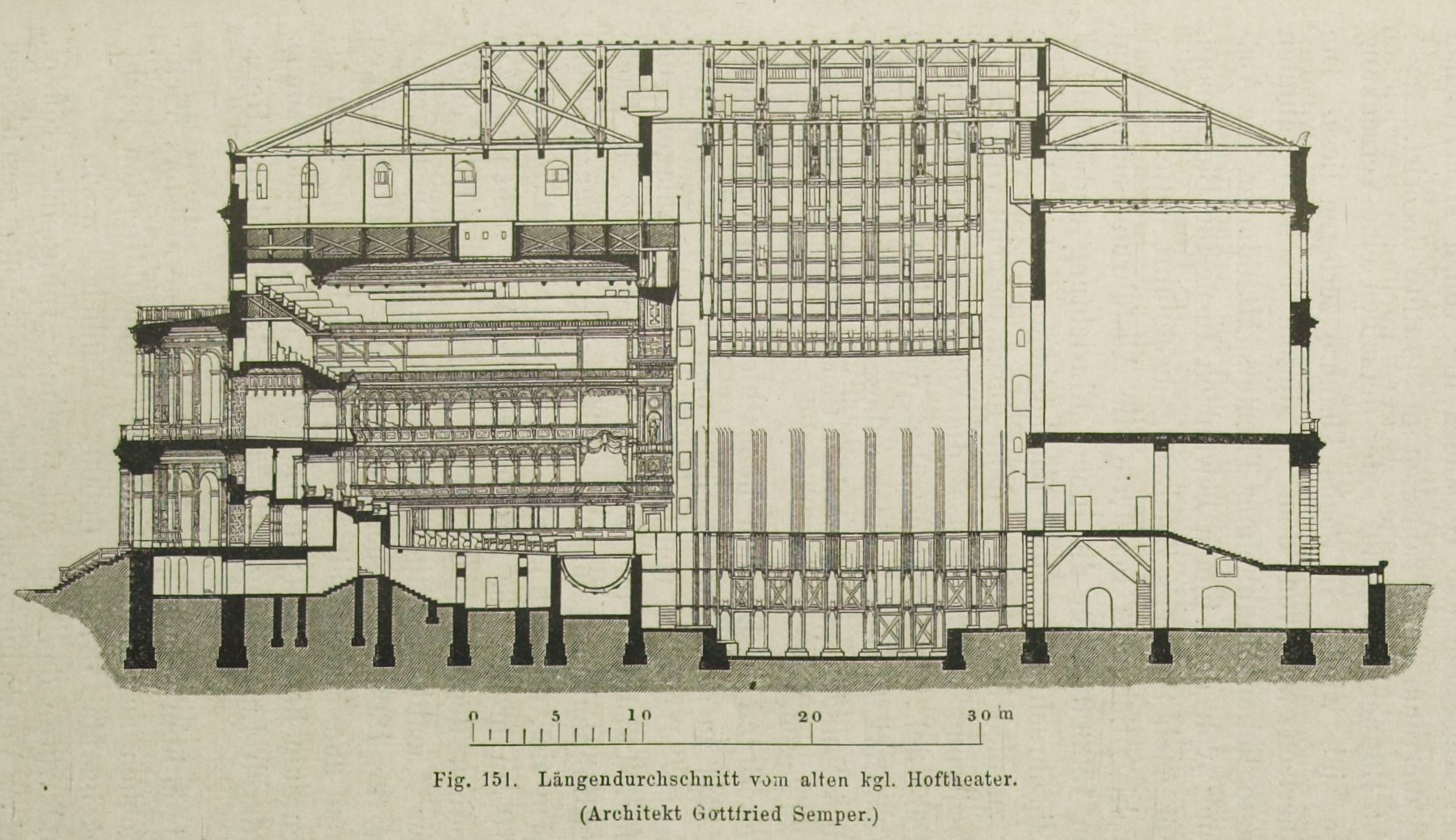
Longitudinal section
