= Johann Michael Wächter =

Austrian opera singer

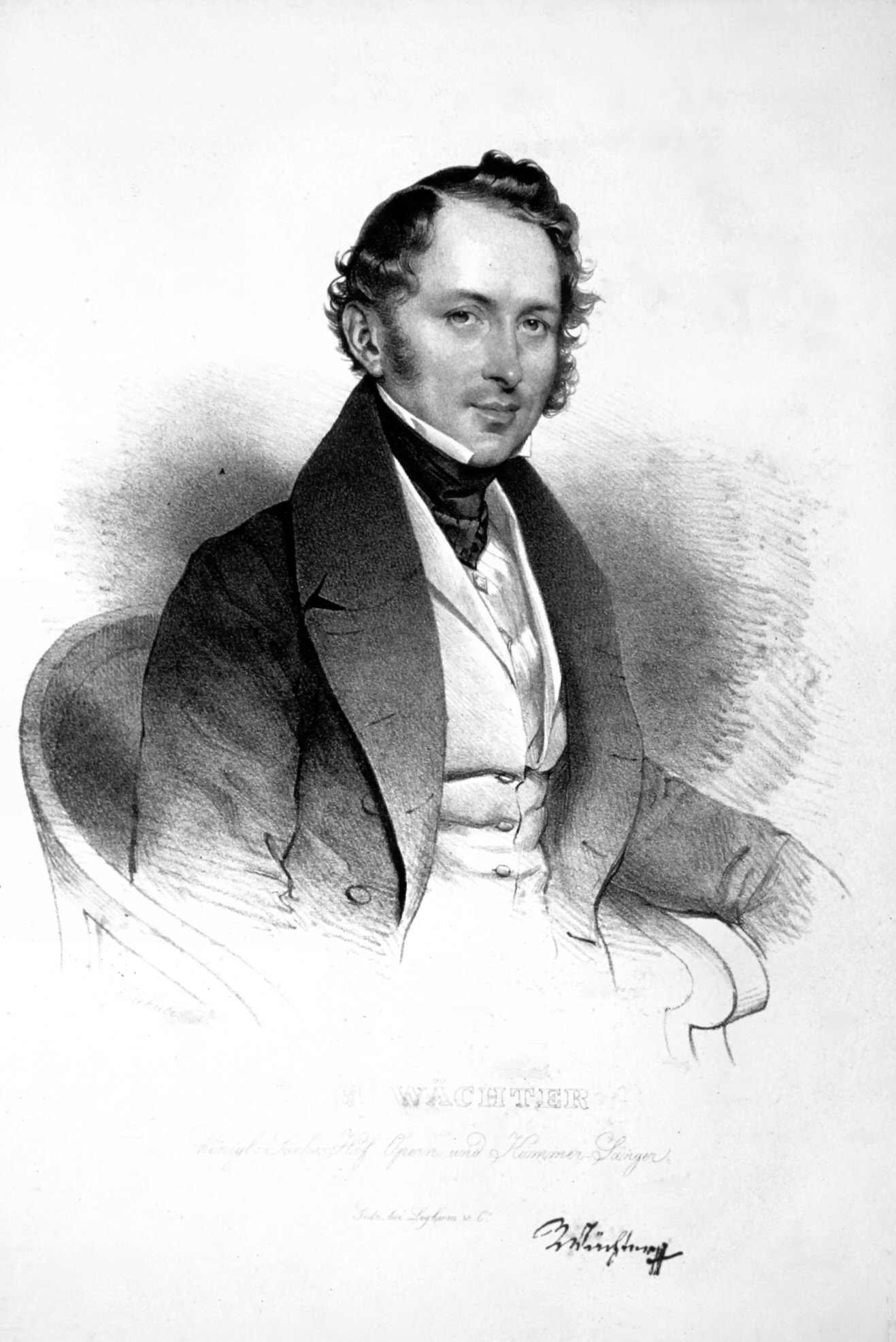
Johann Michael Wächter, lithograph by Josef Kriehuber, 1834

Johann Michael Wächter (2 March 1794 – 26 May 1853) was an Austrian bass-baritone most famous for appearing in the operas of Richard Wagner.

Born in Rappersdorf in Austria, Wächter sang in various church choirs in Vienna, making his stage début in 1819 at Graz as Don Giovanni in Mozart's Don Giovanni. He also appeared at Bratislava, Vienna and Berlin. In 1827 he joined the Dresden Hofoper, where he remained for the rest of his career. Here his roles included Mozart's The Marriage of Figaro, and he sang in three Wagner premières, playing Orsini in Rienzi in 1842, the title role in Der fliegende Holländer in 1843, and Biterolf in Tannhäuser in 1845.

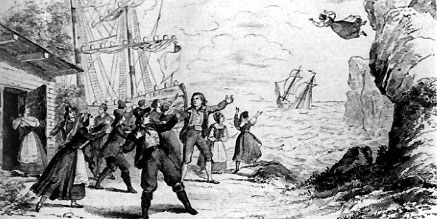
The last scene of Wagner's The Flying Dutchman (1843)

Hector Berlioz, who heard The Flying Dutchman in Dresden, considered Wächter's baritone ‘...one of the finest I have ever heard, and he uses it like a consummate singer. It is of that rich and vibrant timbre that has such a wonderful power of expression, provided that the artist sings with soul and feeling, which Wächter does to a high degree’.

Wächter, an old friend of Wagner's, was not equal to the demanding role of the Dutchman. Wagner later wrote:

"His total incapacity in the difficult role of my spectral, suffering mariner dawned on Schröder-Devrient unfortunately only after the rehearsals were too far along to make any change. Wächter's distressing corpulence, particularly his broad, round face and the curious way he moved his arms and legs like shrivelled stumps, sent my Senta in transports of despair."

His wife, the mezzo-soprano Thérèse Wächter-Wittman (31 August 1802 in Vienna – 3 October 1879 in Dresden), also sang at Dresden, creating the role of Mary in The Flying Dutchman. Wächter died in Dresden in 1853.
