= Sandvika, Agder =

Village in Tvedestrand Municipality, Norway

Sandvika
- Village
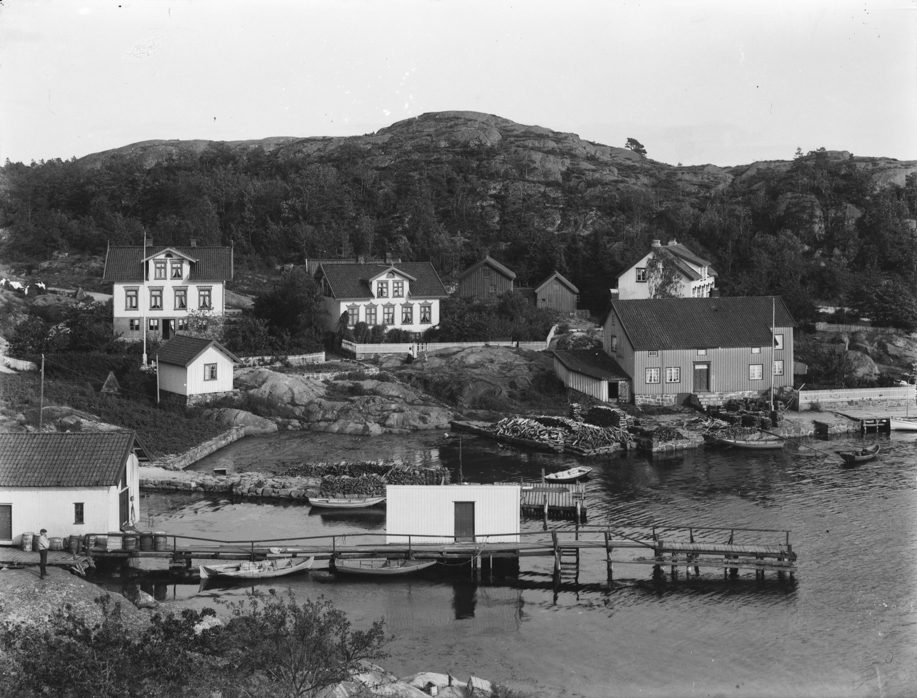
- View of the village
- Interactive map of Sandvika
- Coordinates: 58.5700°N 09.0012°E
- Country: Norway
- Region: Southern Norway
- County: Agder
- District: Østre Agder
- Municipality: Tvedestrand Municipality
- Elevation: 7 m (23 ft)
- Time zone: UTC+01:00 (CET)
  - Summer (DST): UTC+02:00 (CEST)
- Post Code: 4916 Borøy

Sandvika is a village in Tvedestrand Municipality in Agder county, Norway. The village is located on the southern coast of the island of Borøya, along the Oksefjorden, about 12 kilometres (7.5 mi) south of the town of Tvedestrand. The village is mentioned in the first scene of Richard Wagner's opera Der fliegende Holländer.
