= Borøya, Tvedestrand =

Island in Agder, Norway

Borøya
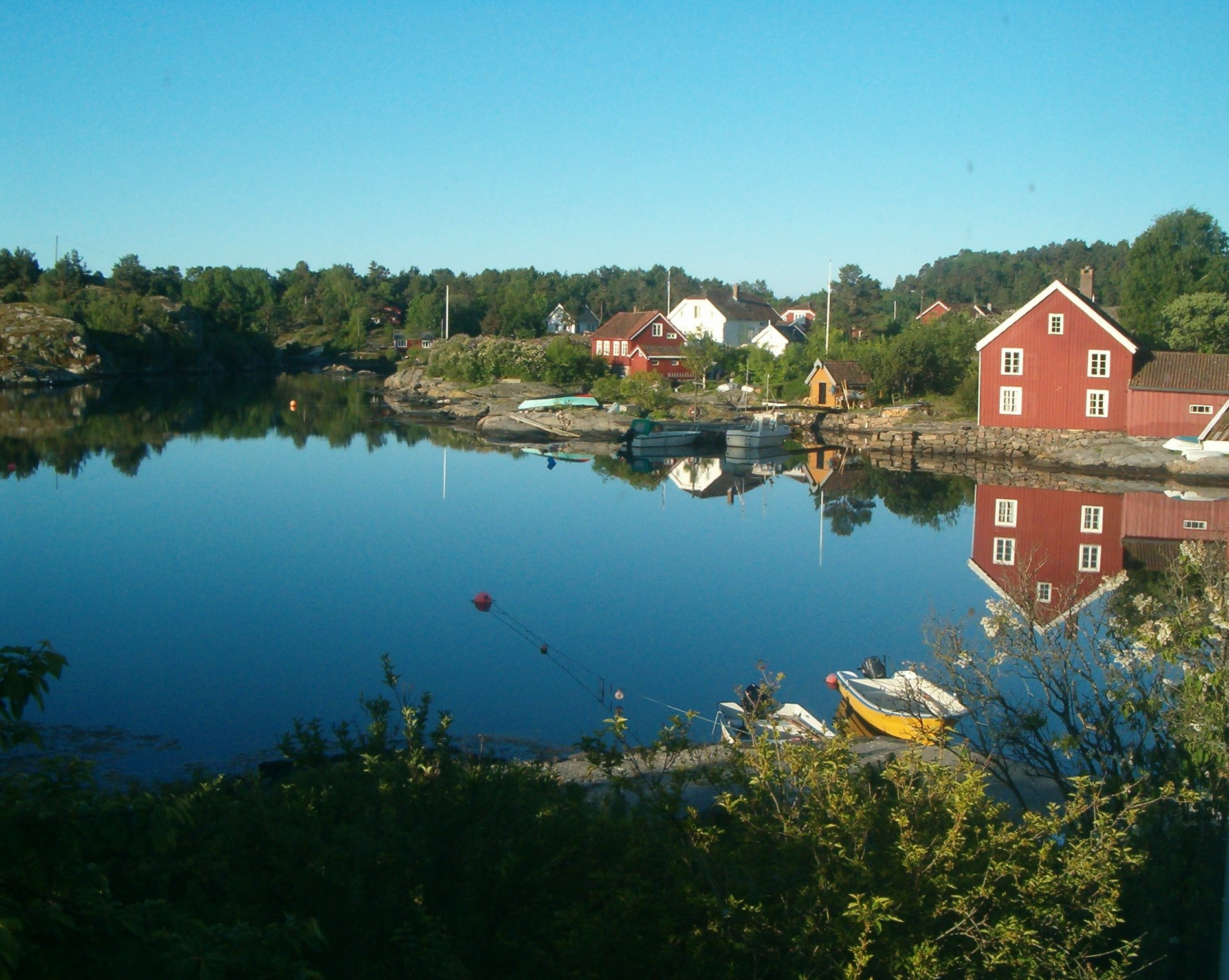
- Interactive map of the island

Geography
- Location: Agder, Norway
- Coordinates: 58.5844°N 09.0062°E
- Area: 3.4 km^{2} (1.3 sq mi)
- Length: 3.8 km (2.36 mi)
- Width: 1.3 km (0.81 mi)
- Highest elevation: 67 m (220 ft)
- Highest point: Rendalsfjell

Administration
- Norway
- County: Agder
- Municipality: Tvedestrand Municipality

Demographics
- Population: 232 (2019)

Borøya is an island in Tvedestrand Municipality in Agder county, Norway. The 3.4-square-kilometre (1.3 sq mi) island lies along the Oksefjorden between the islands of Sandøya and Tverrdalsøya. Some of the villages on the island include Sandvika, Borøkilen, Utgårdstrand, and Snarsund. The island has about 232 residents (in 2019) and it has one bridge connecting it to the mainland.

== Name ==
Ancient written works often spell the name with an "e" (e.g. Berøy). The origin of the name could be derived from the Old Norse word beri, bjørn, or bær.

== See also ==
- List of islands of Norway
