= Georg Fritz Weiß =

German operatic bass

Georg Fritz Weiß (5 February 1822 – 14 March 1893) was a German operatic bass, actor as well as translator. Other names are Georg Fritz Weiss, Georg Weiß, Georg Weiss, Fritz Weiß and Fritz Weiss.

== Life and career ==
Born in Ehrenfriedersdorf, Weiß received his vocal training during his school years at the Thomasschule zu Leipzig in the Thomanerchor. In addition to Leipzig University of philology and jurisprudence, he practised his musical skills in the university choral society. From the winter of 1845/46 he was a member of the Leipziger Universitäts-Sängerschaft zu St. Pauli in Mainz (today Deutsche Sängerschaft. On the occasion of a trip to Dresden in 1849, he met the director of the Dresden Court Theatre, who engaged him for small roles and entrusted his further vocal training to Barbieri.

Engagements took him to Görlitz, Königsberg, Kassel, Brünn, Stralsund and Rostock; his engagement to St. Petersburg in 1857 fell through, whereupon Weiß returned to Dresden. Here he was entrusted with the role of First Speaker for The Magic Flute. At the Königliches Hoftheater Dresden he was to remain an ensemble member as Royal Court Opera Singer and actor throughout the rest of his artistic life.

Weiß, who became a Freemason in 1865, retired to Niederlößnitz where he died at the age of 71.

Alongside his artistic career, Weiß had always pursued his field of interest in philology. He translated the "Attic Nights" (Noctes Atticae) of Aulus Gellius, which appeared in 1875/1876 and for which he received the appointment of Doctor of Philosophy at the University of Leipzig. In this context, Weiß also produced the Index Gellianus. Further translations of late Latin writers followed. After the translation of The Golden Ass (Metamorphoses) by Apuleius of Madauros, he could only dictate the "Apology" to his wife in the pen, the work appeared posthumously in 1894.

Weiß was buried at the Dresden Trinitatisfriedhof.

== Work ==
- Aulus Gellius: Die attischen Nächte. 2 volumes, 1875–1876, Nachdruck WBG, Darmstadt 1981 (einzige deutsche Gesamtübersetzung Numerized).
