= Oksefjorden (Agder) =

Fjord in Agder, Norway

- Interactive map of the fjord
- Location: Agder county, Norway
- Coordinates: 58.5781°N 08.9892°E
- Type: Fjord
- Primary inflows: Tvedestrandfjorden
- Primary outflows: Skagerrak
- Basin countries: Norway
- Max. length: 5 kilometres (3.1 mi)
- Max. width: 750 metres (2,460 ft)

Oksefjorden is a fjord in Agder county, Norway. The 5-kilometre (3.1 mi) long fjord runs between the islands of Borøya and Tverrdalsøya along the border of Tvedestrand Municipality and Arendal Municipality. At the north end of the fjord, it joins the Tvedestrandfjorden and the Eikelandsfjorden and at the south end it flows into the Skagerrak. The village of Sandvika lies along the northern shore of the fjord (on Borøya island) and the village of Holmesund (on Tverrdalsøya island).

== See also ==
- List of Norwegian fjords
