= Rienzi =

1842 opera by Richard Wagner

Rienzi, der letzte der Tribunen
- Opera by Richard Wagner
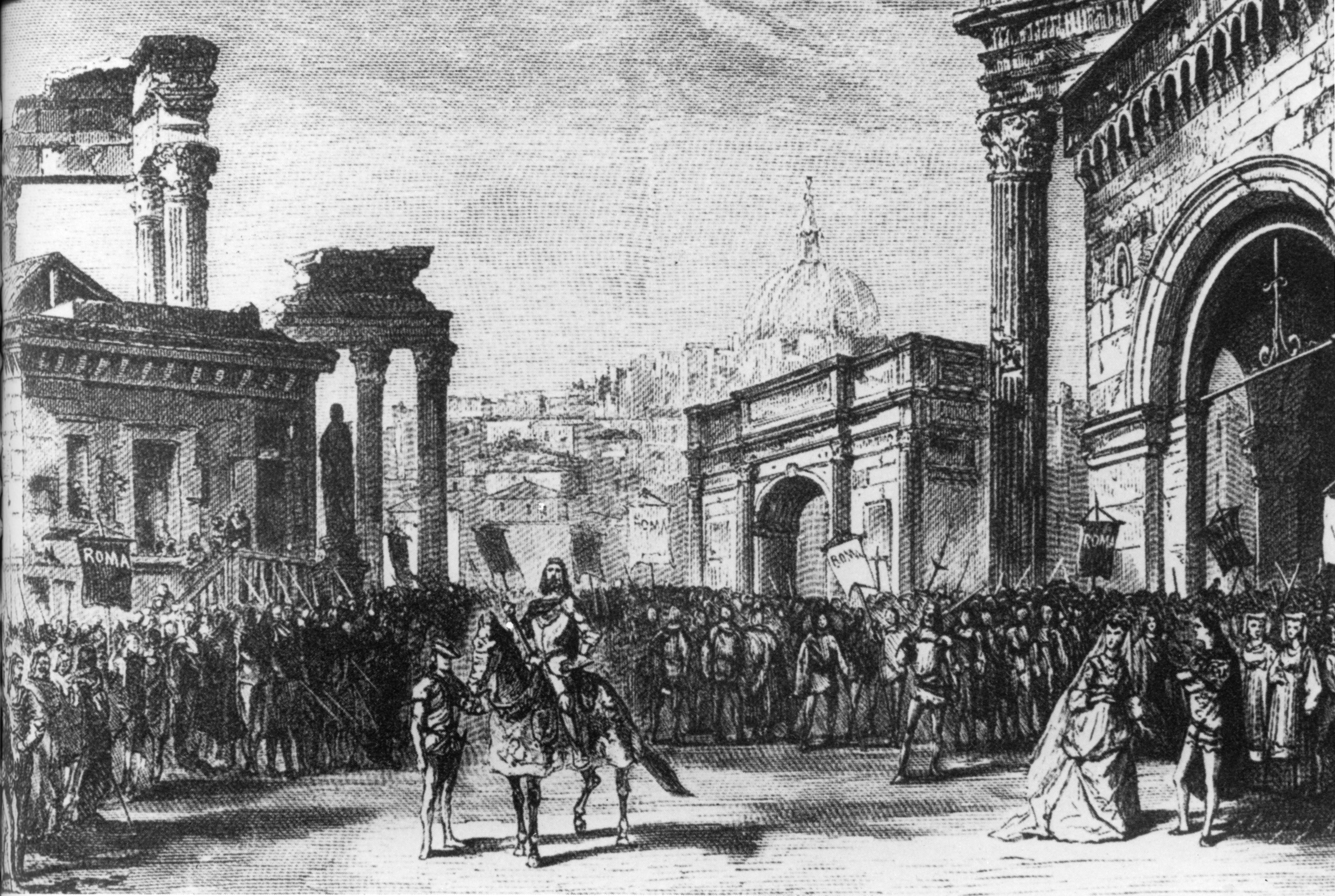
- Last scene of act 3 of Rienzi at the Théâtre Lyrique, 1869
- Librettist: Richard Wagner
- Language: German
- Based on: Edward Bulwer-Lytton's novel Rienzi
- Premiere: 20 October 1842; Königliches Hoftheater Dresden

Rienzi, der letzte der Tribunen (Rienzi, the last of the tribunes; WWV 49) is an 1842 opera by Richard Wagner in five acts, with the libretto written by the composer after Edward Bulwer-Lytton's novel of the same name (1835). The title is commonly shortened to Rienzi [ˈrjɛntsi]. Composed between July 1838 and November 1840, it was first performed at the Königliches Hoftheater Dresden, on 20 October 1842 and was the composer's first success.

The opera is set in Rome and is based on the life of Cola di Rienzo (1313–1354), a late medieval Italian populist figure who succeeds in outwitting and defeating the nobles and their followers and in raising the power of the people. Magnanimous at first, he is forced by events to crush the nobles' rebellion against the people's power, but popular opinion changes and even the Church, which had initially urged him to assert himself, turns against him. In the end the populace burns the Capitol, in which Rienzi and a few adherents have made a last stand.

== Composition history ==
Rienzi is Wagner's third completed opera, and is mostly written in a grand opera style. In his 1860 essay "Music of the Future," Wagner called it "a work full of youthful fire" which was inspired by "the heroic opera of Spontini" and the Parisian grand opera of Daniel Auber, Giacomo Meyerbeer, and Fromental Halévy. Rienzi's depictions of the mob, the liberal ethos associated with the hero and the political intervention of a reactionary clergy recall Spontini's La vestale (1807), Halévy's La Juive (1835), and Meyerbeer's Les Huguenots (1836). Each act ends with an extended finale ensemble and is replete with solos, duets, trios and crowd scenes. There is also an extended ballet in act 2 according to the accepted Grand Opera format. Hans von Bülow was later to joke that "Rienzi is Meyerbeer's best opera".

Wagner began to draft the opera in Riga in 1837, after reading Lytton's novel (although John Deathridge has argued that Wagner's work also bears the influence of Mary Russell Mitford's 1828 "highly successful English play" Rienzi). During a 1839 visit to the bathing resort town of Boulogne, Wagner approached Meyerbeer with a partial draft of Rienzi, and the elder composer responded with encouragement. Meyerbeer also introduced Wagner to Ignaz Moscheles, who was also staying at Boulogne; as Ernest Newman comments, this was "Wagner's first meeting with real international musical celebrities". When the opera was completed in 1840, Wagner hoped for it to be premiered at the Berlin Royal Opera or the Paris Opéra.

Several circumstances, including his lack of influence, prevented this. Moreover, Wagner's wife Minna, in a letter of 28 October 1840 to Wagner's friend Apel, who had likely first made the suggestion that Wagner compose Rienzi, mentions a plan to perform the overture to Rienzi "a fortnight hence", but contains a clear indication that her husband had just been committed to a debtors' prison. The full score of Rienzi was completed on 19 November 1840.

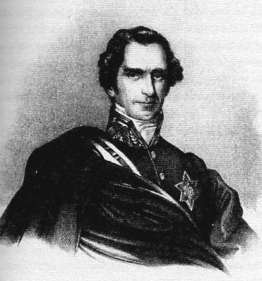
Baron von Lüttichau, director of the Dresden Court Opera from 1824

In 1841 Wagner moved to Meudon, just outside Paris, where the debt laws could be more easily evaded, whilst awaiting developments for Rienzi, having already written to King Frederick Augustus II of Saxony, requesting that he order a production of the work in Dresden.

With the support of Meyerbeer, a staging of Rienzi was arranged in Dresden; Meyerbeer wrote to the Director of the Opera in Dresden, Baron von Lüttichau, that he found the opera "rich in fantasy and of great dramatic effect". This, with the proposed staging of Der fliegende Holländer in Berlin, also supported by Meyerbeer, persuaded Wagner to return to Germany in April 1842. During rehearsals the performers were highly enthusiastic; the tenor Tichatschek, in the title role, was so impressed with a passage from act 3 (later deleted because of the opera's length), that "at each rehearsal, each of the soloists contributed a silver groschen to [a] fund that Tichatschek had started ... No one suspected that what was an amiable joke for them was the means of buying [Wagner] an extra morsel of sorely-needed food."

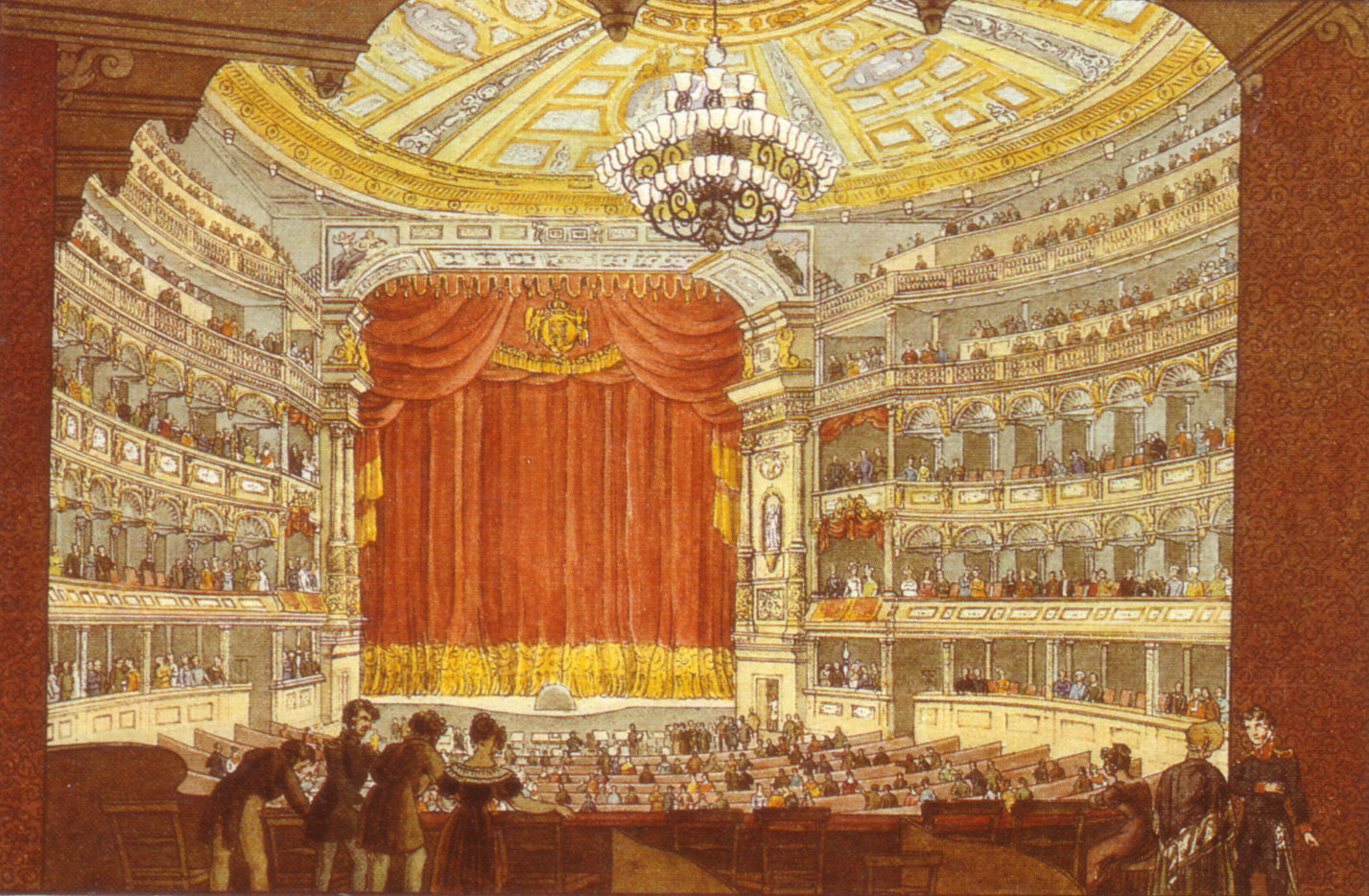
Interior of the first Dresden Opera House, where Rienzi was premiered in 1842 (contemporary sketch by J. C. A. Richter)

The premiere of Rienzi took place on 20 October 1842 in the new Dresden Opera House, designed by the architect Gottfried Semper and opened the previous year. Semper and Wagner were later to become friends in Dresden, a connection which eventually led to Semper providing designs which became a basis of Wagner's Festspielhaus in Bayreuth.

The first performance of Rienzi was well received in Dresden despite running over six hours (including intermissions). One legend is that, fearful of the audience departing, Wagner stopped the clock above the stage. In his later memoirs, Mein Leben, Wagner recalled:

No subsequent experience has given me feelings even remotely similar to those I had on this day of the first performance of Rienzi. The only too well-founded anxiety as to their success has so dominated my feelings at all subsequent first performances of my works that I could never really enjoy them or take much notice of the way the audience was behaving.[...] The initial success of Rienzi was no doubt assured beforehand. But the uproarious way in which the public declared its partiality for me was extraordinary ... The public had been forcibly predisposed to accept it, because everyone connected with the theatre had been spreading such favourable reports ... that the entire population was looking forward to what was heralded as a miracle ... In trying to recall my condition that evening, I can remember it only as possessing all the features of a dream.

Subsequently, Wagner experimented with giving the opera over two evenings (at the suggestion of von Lüttichau), and making cuts to enable a more reasonable performance in a single evening.

== Performance history ==
Despite Wagner's reservations, Rienzi remained one of his most successful operas until the early 20th century. In Dresden alone, it reached its 100th performance in 1873 and 200th in 1908 and it was regularly performed throughout the 19th century in major opera houses throughout Europe and beyond, including those in America and England in 1878/9. The Paris premiere of Rienzi finally took place on 6 April 1869 at the Théâtre Lyrique under the baton of Jules Pasdeloup. The US premiere took place on 4 March 1878 at the Academy of Music in New York and was followed on 27 January 1879 by the first UK performance at Her Majesty's Theatre in London. The overture was the first work performed at the inaugural Henry Wood Promenade Concert at the Queen's Hall in London in August 1895.

A staging at the English National Opera in London, produced by Nicholas Hytner in 1983, placed the hero in the context of 20th-century totalitarianism. A production by David Pountney at the Vienna State Opera in 1999 set the work in the "near future". Of this production Pountney wrote:

Wagner invested the musical realization of Rienzi with the unashamed extravagance and tasteless exaggeration of a Las Vegas hotel ... only the self-consciously deliberate and unabashed use of kitsch could match this musical egomania.

Other contemporary productions have been rare. Performances were given at the Theater Bremen in April/May 2009 and at the Deutsche Oper Berlin and Oper Leipzig in April/May 2010. In July 2013, the bicentennial year of Wagner's birth, performances of all three of Wagner's early operas, including Rienzi, took place for the first time at Bayreuth, at the Oberfrankenhalle. This performance trimmed some parts, including the second-act ballet. The Boston premiere was produced in concert by Odyssey Opera in September 2013 as their inaugural performance. The Australian premiere was a concert performance by Melbourne Opera in December 2013, as part of the bicentennial celebrations.

On 26 July, 2026, Rienzi was performed in the Bayreuth Festspielhaus for the first time, as part of the celebrations for the 150th anniversary of the Bayreuth Festival.

== Roles ==
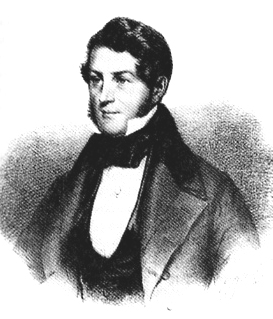
Carl Reißiger, conductor of the first performance of Rienzi

Roles, voice types, premiere cast
Role	Voice type	Premiere cast, 20 October 1842 Conductor: Carl Reißiger
Cola Rienzi, Roman Tribune	tenor	Josef Tichatschek
Irene, his sister	soprano	Henriette Wüst
Stefano Colonna, a nobleman	bass	Georg Wilhelm Dettmer
Adriano, his son	soprano (en travesti)	Wilhelmine Schröder-Devrient
Paolo Orsini, another patrician	bass	Johann Michael Wächter
Raimondo, Papal Legate	bass	Gioacchino Vestri
Baroncelli, Roman citizen	tenor	Friedrich Traugott Reinhold
Cecco del Vecchio, Roman citizen	bass	Karl Risse
The Messenger of Peace	soprano	Anna Thiele
Ambassadors, Nobles, Priests, Monks, Soldiers, Messengers, Populace

== Synopsis ==
=== Overture ===
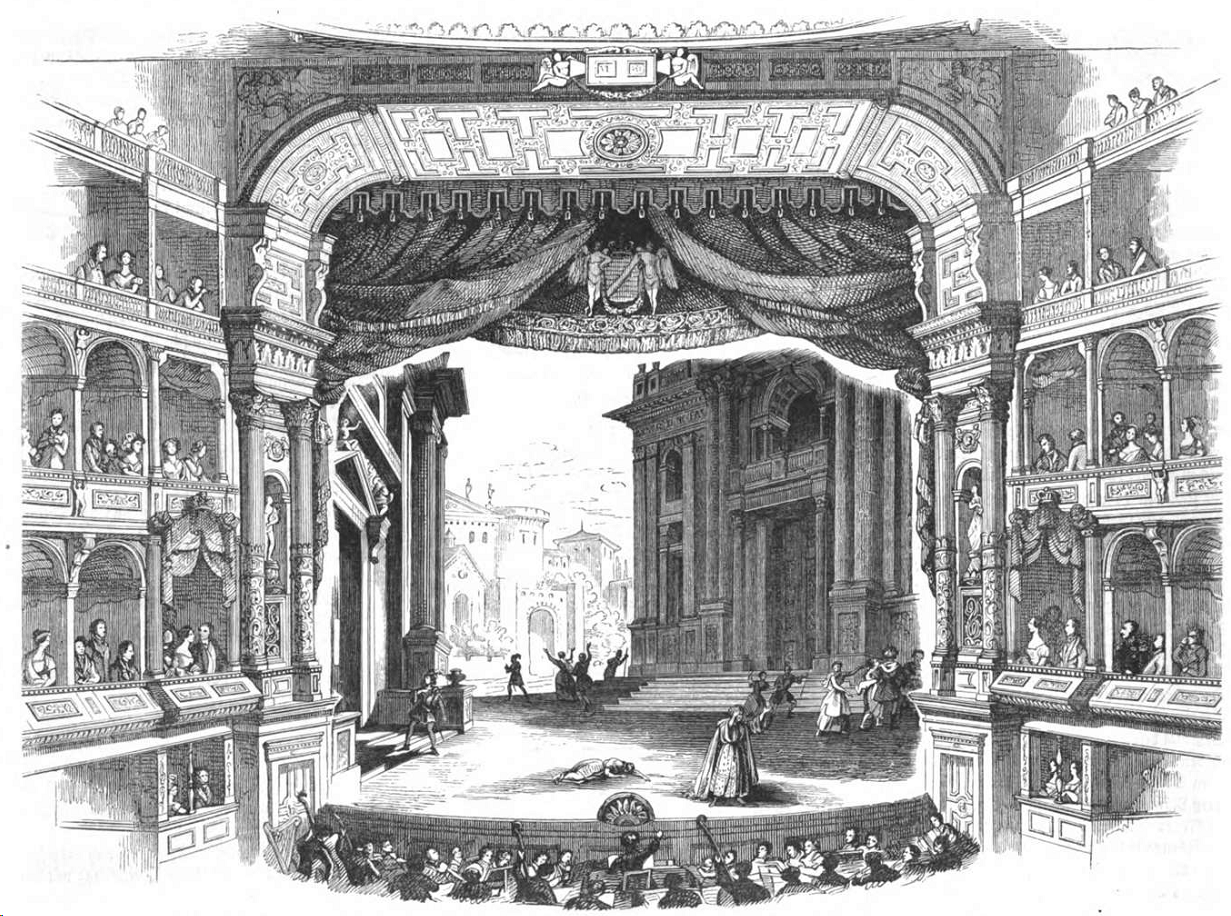
Act 4, last scene, in the Dresden Opera House (1842)

The opera opens with a substantial overture which begins with a trumpet call (which in act 3 we learn is the war call of the Colonna family) and features the melody of Rienzi's prayer at the start of act 5, which became the opera's best-known aria. The overture ends with a military march.

=== Act 1 ===
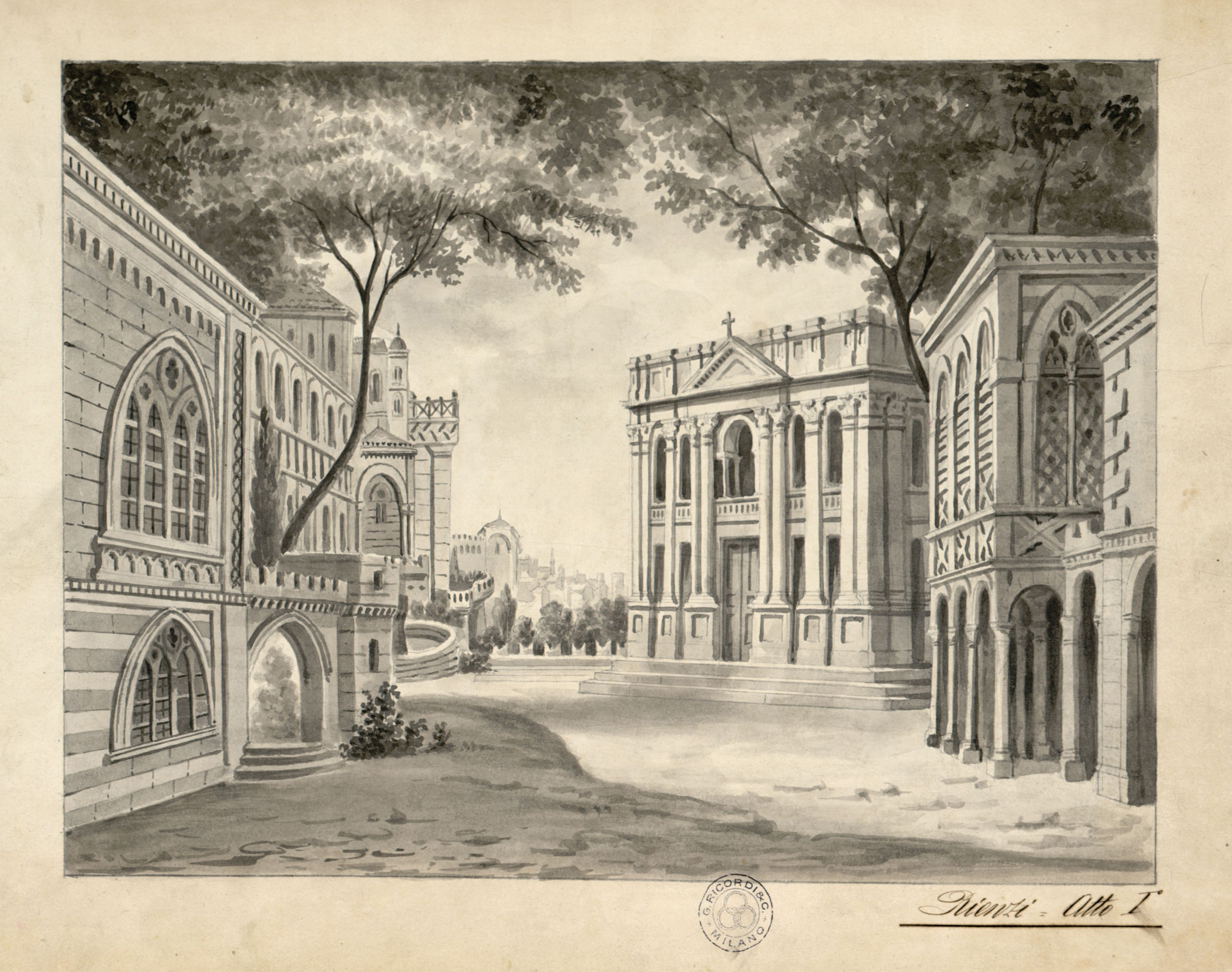
Una via, nel fondo la chiesa del Laterano. On the right Rienzi's house, set design for Rienzi act 1 (1842).

Outside Rienzi's house

The patrician Orsini and his cronies attempt to kidnap Rienzi's sister Irene. Stefano Colonna, also a patrician but inclined to support Rienzi, prevents them. Raimondo appeals to the parties in the name of the Church to stop their fighting; Rienzi's eventual appearance (marked by a dramatic key shift, from D to E flat) quells the riot. The Roman people support Rienzi's condemnation of the nobles. Irene and Adriano realise their mutual attraction (duet "Ja, eine Welt voll Leiden" – Yes, a world of sorrows). A gathering crowd of plebeians, inspired by Rienzi's speeches, offers Rienzi the crown; he demurs, insisting that he wishes only to be a Tribune of the Roman people.

=== Act 2 ===
A hall in the Capitol

The patricians plot the death of Rienzi; Adriano is horrified when he learns of this. Rienzi greets a group of ambassadors for whom an entertainment is laid on (a lengthy ballet). Orsini attempts to stab Rienzi, who however is protected by a vest of chain mail. Adriano pleads with Rienzi for mercy to the nobles, which Rienzi grants.

The act 2 ballet is noteworthy as Wagner made a clear attempt to make it relevant to the action of the opera (whereas in most Grand Operas the ballet was simply an entertaining diversion). The Rienzi ballet was intended to tell the tale of the 'Rape of Lucretia'. This storyline (in which Tarquinius, the last king of Rome, attempts to rape the virtuous Lucretia), parallels both the action of Rienzi (Orsini's attempt on Irene) and its background (patricians versus the people). In its original form the ballet lasts for over half an hour – in modern performances and recordings it is generally drastically cut.

=== Act 3 ===
The Roman Forum

The patricians have recruited an army to march on Rome. The people are alarmed. Adriano begs Rienzi to stop the war, offering his own life to avoid bloodshed, but is ignored. Rienzi rouses the people and leads them to victory over the nobles, in the course of which Adriano's father Stefano is killed. Adriano swears revenge, but Rienzi dismisses him.

=== Act 4 ===
Before the Lateran Church

Cecco and other citizens discuss the negotiations of the patricians with the Pope and with the Emperor of Germany. Adriano's intention to kill Rienzi wavers when Rienzi arrives together with Irene. Raimondo now announces that the Pope has laid a papal ban on Rienzi, and that his associates risk excommunication. Despite Adriano's urgings, Irene resolves to stay with Rienzi.

=== Act 5 ===
Scene 1: A room in the Capitol

Rienzi in his prayer "Allmächt'ger Vater" (Almighty Father!) asserts his faith in the people of Rome. He suggests to Irene that she seek safety with Adriano, but she demurs. An apologetic Adriano enters and tells the pair that the Capitol is to be burnt and they are at risk.

Scene 2: The Capitol is ablaze

Rienzi's attempts to speak are met with stones and insults from the fickle crowd. Adriano, in trying to rescue Rienzi and Irene, is killed with them as the building collapses.

In the original performances, Rienzi's final words are bitter and pessimistic: "May the town be accursed and destroyed! Disintegrate and wither, Rome! Your degenerate people wish it so." However, for the 1847 Berlin performance Wagner substituted a more upbeat rhetoric: "Ever while the seven hills of Rome remain, ever while the eternal city stands, you will see Rienzi's return!".

== Reception and performances ==
Rienzi was an immediate success. This, his first real success of any kind, was crucial in Wagner's career, launching him as a composer to be reckoned with. It was followed, within months, by his appointment as Kapellmeister at the Dresden Opera (February 1843), which also gave him considerable prestige. It also received critical acclaim elsewhere in Europe. The young Eduard Hanslick, later to be one of Wagner's foremost critical adversaries, wrote in 1846 in Vienna:

I am of the firm opinion that [Rienzi] is the finest thing achieved in grand opera in the last twelve years, that it is the most significant dramatic creation since Les Huguenots, and that it is just as epoch-making for its own time as were Les Huguenots, Der Freischütz, and Don Giovanni, each for its respective period of musical history.

Other critical comments through the ages have included (apart from von Bülow's jibe about it being 'Meyerbeer's best opera'), 'Meyerbeer's worst opera' (Charles Rosen), 'an attack of musical measles' (Ernest Newman) and ' the greatest musical drama ever composed' (Gustav Mahler).

Franz Liszt wrote a "Fantasy on Themes from Rienzi" (S. 439) for piano in 1859.

Wagner later perceived Rienzi as an embarrassment; in his 1852 autobiographical essay, "A Communication to My Friends", he wrote "I saw it only in the shape of 'five acts', with five brilliant 'finales', with hymns, processions and the musical clash of arms". Cosima Wagner recorded Wagner's comment in her diary for 20 June 1871:

Rienzi is very repugnant to me, but they should at least recognize the fire in it; I was a music director and I wrote a grand opera; the fact that it was this same music director who gave them some hard nuts to crack – that's what should astonish them.

Although the composer disclaimed it, it can be noted that Rienzi prefigures themes (brother/sister relationships, social order and revolution) to which Wagner often returned.

== Rienzi and Adolf Hitler ==
August Kubizek, a boyhood friend of Adolf Hitler, claimed that Hitler was so influenced by seeing Rienzi as a young man in 1906 or 1907 that it triggered his political career, and that when Kubizek reminded Hitler, in 1939 at Bayreuth, of his exultant response to the opera Hitler had replied, "At that hour it all began!" Although Kubizek's veracity has been seriously questioned, it is known that Hitler possessed the original manuscript of the opera, which he had requested and been given as a fiftieth birthday present in 1939. The manuscript was with Hitler in his bunker; it was either stolen, lost or destroyed by fire in the destruction of the bunker's contents after Hitler's death (the manuscript of Wagner's earlier work Die Feen is believed to have met with the same fate). Thomas Grey comments:

In every step of Rienzi's career – from ... acclamation as leader of the Volk, through military struggle, violent suppression of mutinous factions, betrayal and ... final immolation – Hitler would doubtless have found sustenance for his fantasies.

Albert Speer claims to have remembered an incident when Robert Ley advocated using a modern composition to open the Party Rallies in Nuremberg, but Hitler rejected this idea:

"You know, Ley, it isn't by chance that I have the Party Rallies open with the overture to Rienzi. It's not just a musical question. At the age of twenty-four this man, an innkeeper's son, persuaded the Roman people to drive out the corrupt Senate by reminding them of the magnificent past of the Roman Empire. Listening to this blessed music as a young man in the theater at Linz, I had the vision that I too must someday succeed in uniting the German Empire and making it great once more."

== Editions ==
It is neither possible to reconstruct Wagner's "original" Rienzi, nor to establish a version of the opera that reflects Wagner's final thoughts on the score. The original performance version of Rienzi was lost in the Dresden bombing of 1945, and the manuscript on which that performance was based was lost in Berlin in 1945. No full copies had been made of either version, as far as is known. Since Wagner never settled on a final version of the opera, all performances of it since 1945 have been reconstructions.

A vocal score of the early 1840s, based on Wagner's draft, remains as the only existing primary source. Two surviving full scores made in Dresden under Wagner's supervision in the early 1840s incorporate the heavy cuts that were made in early performances of the work. The first printed score, made under Wagner's supervision in 1844, reflects even heavier cuts.

A critical edition of the opera was prepared by Schott's in Mainz in 1976 as volume III of their scholarly complete edition of Wagner's works. This edition was edited by Wagner scholars Reinhard Strohm and Egon Voss; it uses the extant sources and presents as well the 1844 piano version prepared by Gustav Klink, which includes some of the passages excised from early performances.

== Recordings ==
Complete recordings and performances of Rienzi are rare, although the overture is regularly found on radio broadcasts and compilation CDs. Significant cuts to the score are common in recordings.

Audio recordings include:

- Winfried Zillig conducting the Sinfonieorchester des Hessischen Rundfunks. Günther Treptow, Trude Eipperle, Helmut Fehn, Erna Schlüter, Rudolf Gonszar, Heinz Prybit. Frankfurt, 1950.
- Josef Krips conducting the Vienna Symphony Orchestra. Set Svanholm, Walter Berry, Christa Ludwig, Alois Pernerstorfer, Paul Schöffler. 1960 (Melodram).
- Heinrich Hollreiser conducting the Dresden Staatskapelle. René Kollo, Siv Wennberg, Janis Martin, Theo Adam. 1976 (EMI). (Complete recording of Wagner's shortened 1843 version)
- Edward Downes conducting the BBC Northern Symphony Orchestra. John Mitchinson, Lorna Haywood, Michael Langdon, Raimund Herincx. 1976 (Ponto POCD1040) (Complete and uncut recording of Wagner's "original" 1842 version)
- Wolfgang Sawallisch conducting the Bavarian State Opera Orchestra. René Kollo, Jan-Hendrik Rootering, Cheryl Studer, John Janssen. 1983 (Orfeo d'Oro)
- Sebastian Weigle conducting the Frankfurter Opern- und Museumorchester. Peter Bronder, Christiane Libor, Falk Struckmann, Claudia Mahnke. 2013 (Oehms Classics)

Video recordings include:

- Philipp Stölzl (director) and Sebastian Lang-Lessing (conductor) at the Deutsche Oper Berlin, starring Torsten Kerl (Rienzi), Camilla Nylund (Irene), Kate Aldrich (Adriano). 2010 (Unitel Classica / Arthaus Musik)
- Jorge Lavelli (director) and Pinchas Steinberg (conductor) at the Toulouse Théâtre du Capitole, starring Torsten Kerl (Rienzi), Marika Schönberg (Irene), Daniela Sindram (Adriano). 2013 (Opus Arte)

Recordings of the overture include: Hans Knappertsbusch conducting the Vienna Philharmonic Orchestra, Otto Klemperer conducting the Philharmonia Orchestra, James Levine conducting the Metropolitan Opera Orchestra, Arturo Toscanini conducting the NBC Symphony Orchestra, George Szell conducting the Cleveland Orchestra, Lorin Maazel conducting the Philharmonia Orchestra, Leopold Stokowski conducting the Royal Philharmonic Orchestra, Zubin Mehta conducting the New York Philharmonic Orchestra, Mariss Jansons conducting the Oslo Philharmonic, Daniel Barenboim conducting the Chicago Symphony Orchestra and Karl Böhm conducting the Vienna Philharmonic Orchestra.
