= Der fliegende Holländer =

Opera by Richard Wagner

Der fliegende Holländer The Flying Dutchman
- Opera by Richard Wagner
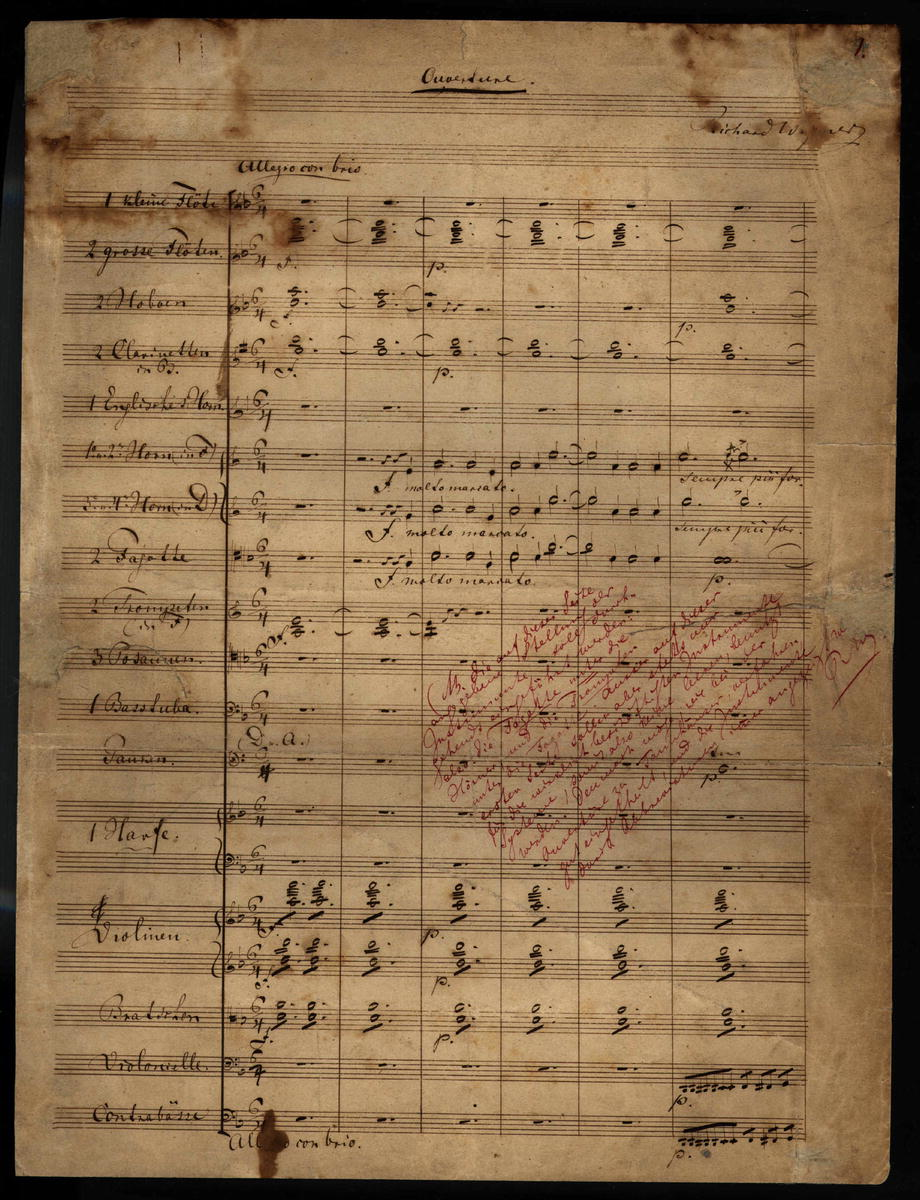
- First page of the autograph of the overture
- Librettist: Richard Wagner
- Language: German
- Based on: Retelling of Der fliegende Holländer by Heinrich Heine
- Premiere: 2 January 1843; Königliches Hoftheater Dresden

Der fliegende Holländer (The Flying Dutchman), WWV 63, is a German-language opera, with libretto and music by Richard Wagner. The central theme is redemption through love. Wagner conducted the premiere at the Königliches Hoftheater Dresden in 1843.

Wagner claimed in his 1870 autobiography Mein Leben that he had been inspired to write the opera following a stormy sea crossing he made from Riga to London in July and August 1839. In his 1843 Autobiographic Sketch, Wagner acknowledged he had taken the story from Heinrich Heine's retelling of the legend in his 1833 satirical novel The Memoirs of Mister von Schnabelewopski (Aus den Memoiren des Herrn von Schnabelewopski).

This work shows early attempts at operatic styles that would characterise his later music dramas. In Der fliegende Holländer Wagner uses a number of leitmotifs (literally, "leading motifs") associated with the characters and themes. The leitmotifs are all introduced in the overture, which begins with a well-known ocean or storm motif before moving into the Dutchman and Senta motifs.

Wagner originally wrote the work to be performed without intermission – an example of his efforts to break with tradition – and, while today's opera houses often still follow this directive, it is also performed in the published three-act version.

The autograph manuscript of the opera is preserved in the Richard Wagner Foundation.

== Composition history ==
At the beginning of 1839, the 26-year-old Richard Wagner was employed as a conductor at the Court Theatre in Riga. His extravagant lifestyle plus the retirement from the stage of his actress wife, Minna Planer, caused him to run up huge debts that he was unable to repay. Wagner was writing Rienzi and hatched a plan to flee his creditors in Riga, escape to Paris via London and make his fortune by putting Rienzi on to the stage of the Paris Opéra. However, this plan quickly turned to disaster: his passport having been seized by the authorities on behalf of his creditors, he and Minna had to make a dangerous and illegal crossing over the Prussian border, during which Minna suffered a miscarriage. Boarding the ship Thetis, whose captain had agreed to take them without passports, their sea journey was hindered by storms and high seas. The ship at one point took refuge in the Norwegian fjords at Tvedestrand, and a trip that was expected to take eight days finally delivered Wagner to London three weeks after leaving Riga.

Wagner's experience of Paris was also disastrous. He was unable to get work as a conductor, and the Opéra did not want to produce Rienzi. The Wagners were reduced to poverty, relying on handouts from friends and from the little income that Wagner could make writing articles on music and copying scores. Wagner hit on the idea of a one-act opera on the theme of the Flying Dutchman, which he hoped might be performed before a ballet at the Opéra.

The voyage through the Norwegian reefs made a wonderful impression on my imagination; the legend of the Flying Dutchman, which the sailors verified, took on a distinctive, strange colouring that only my sea adventures could have given it.

Wagner wrote the first prose draft of the story in Paris early in May 1840, basing the story on Heinrich Heine's satire "The Memoirs of Mister von Schnabelewopski" ("Aus den Memoiren des Herrn von Schnabelewopski") published in Der Salon in 1834. In Heine's tale, the narrator watches a performance of a fictitious stage play on the theme of the sea captain cursed to sail forever for blasphemy. Heine introduces the character as a Wandering Jew of the ocean, and also added the device taken up so vigorously by Wagner in this, and many subsequent operas: the Dutchman can only be redeemed by the love of a faithful woman. In Heine's version, this is presented as a means for ironic humour; however, Wagner took this theme literally and in his draft, the woman is faithful until death.

By the end of May 1841 Wagner had completed the libretto or poem as he preferred to call it. Composition of the music had begun during May to July of the previous year, 1840, when Wagner wrote Senta's Ballad, the Norwegian Sailors' song in act 3 ("Steuermann, lass die Wacht!") and the subsequent Phantom song of the Dutchman's crew in the same scene. These were composed for an audition at the Paris Opéra, along with the sketch of the plot. Wagner actually sold the sketch to the Director of the Opéra, Léon Pillet, for 500 francs, but was unable to convince him that the music was worth anything. (Note: In 1842, the theater presented an opera Le vaisseau fantôme (The Phantom Ship) composed by Pierre-Louis Dietsch, which Wagner claimed had been developed from the scenario he had sold to the Opéra. The similarity of Dietsch's opera to Wagner's—according to The New Grove Dictionary of Music and Musicians article on Dietsch by Jeffrey Cooper and Barry Millington—is slight, although Wagner's assertion is often repeated.) Wagner composed the rest of the Der fliegende Holländer during the summer of 1841, with the Overture being written last, and by November 1841 the orchestration of the score was complete. While this score was designed to be played continuously in a single act, Wagner later divided the piece into a three-act work. In doing so, however, he did not alter the music significantly, but merely interrupted transitions that had originally been crafted to flow seamlessly (the original one-act layout is restored in some performances).

In his original draft Wagner set the action in Scotland, but he changed the location to Norway shortly before the first production staged in Dresden and conducted by himself in January 1843.

In his essay "A Communication to My Friends" in 1851, Wagner claimed that The Dutchman represented a new start for him: "From here begins my career as poet, and my farewell to the mere concoctor of opera-texts." Indeed - until Rienzi is staged there in 2026 - the opera has been the earliest of Wagner's works performed at the Bayreuth Festival and, at least for that theatre, has traditionally marked the start of the mature Wagner canon.

== Roles ==
Roles, voice types, premier cast
Role	Voice type	Premiere cast, 2 January 1843 Conductor: Richard Wagner
The Dutchman	bass-baritone	Johann Michael Wächter
Senta, Daland's daughter	high dramatic soprano	Wilhelmine Schröder-Devrient
Daland, a Norwegian sea captain	bass	Friedrich Traugott Reinhold
Erik, a huntsman	tenor	Carl Risse
Mary, Senta's nurse	contralto	Thérèse Wächter
Daland's steersman	tenor	Wenzel Bielezizky
Norwegian sailors, the Dutchman's crew, young women

== Instrumentation ==
Der fliegende Holländer is scored for the following instruments:

- piccolo, 2 flutes, 2 oboes (one doubling cor anglais), 2 clarinets, 2 bassoons
- 4 horns, 2 trumpets, 3 trombones, bass tuba
- timpani
- harp
- 1st and 2nd violins, violas, violoncellos, and double basses

on-stage

- 3 piccolos, 6 horns, tam tam, wind machine

== Synopsis ==
Place: On the coast of Norway

=== Act 1 ===
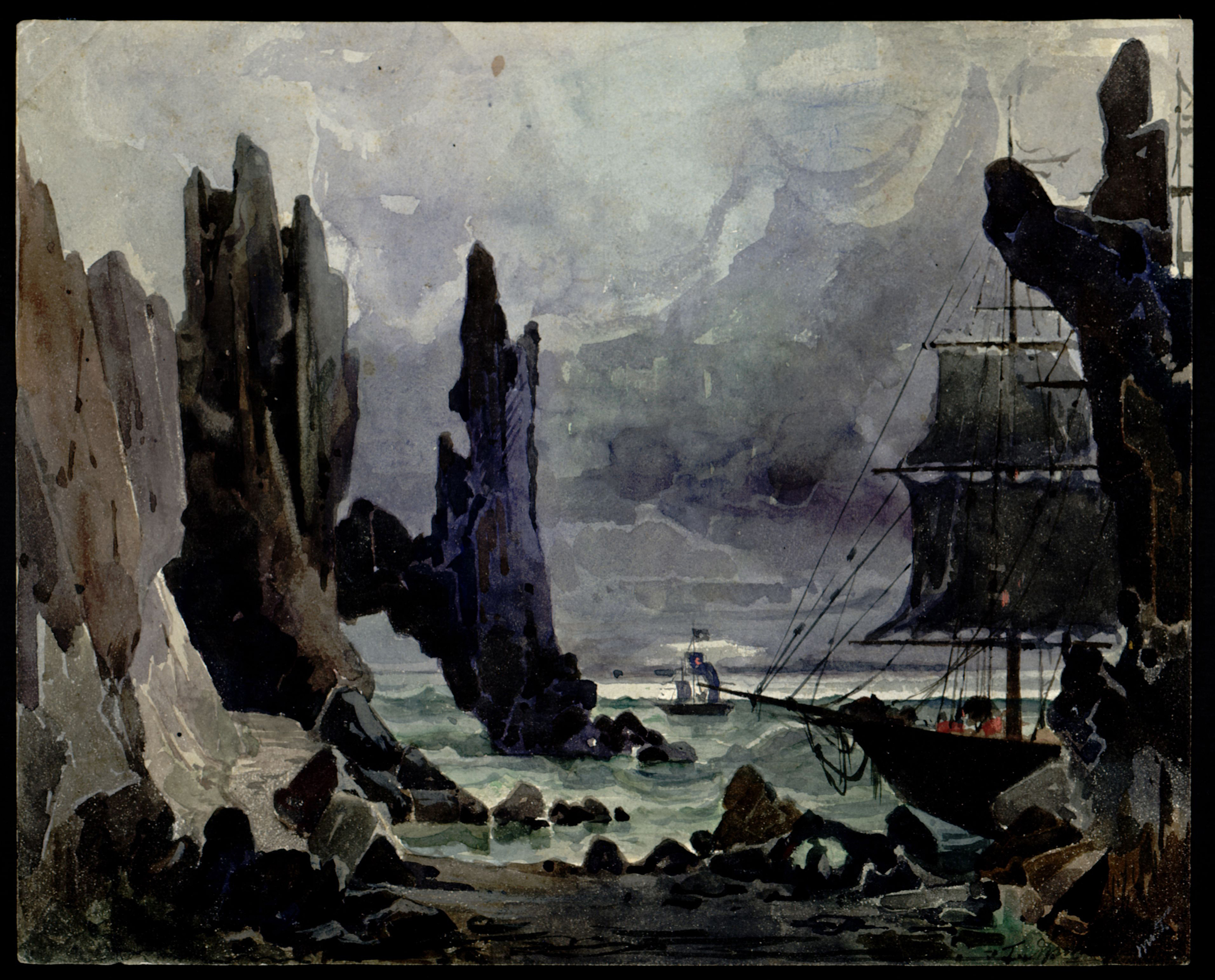
Shore surrounded by rocks, set design for act 1 (1878)

On his homeward journey, the sea captain Daland is compelled by stormy weather to seek a port of refuge near Sandwike in southern Norway. He leaves the helmsman on watch and he and the sailors retire. (Song of the helmsman: "Mit Gewitter und Sturm aus fernem Meer" – "With tempest and storm on distant seas.") The helmsman falls asleep. A ghostly vessel appearing astern is dashed against Daland's vessel by the sea and the grappling irons hold the two ships together. Invisible hands furl the sails. A man of pale aspect, dressed in black, his face framed by a thick black beard, steps ashore. He laments his fate. (Aria: "Die Frist ist um, und abermals verstrichen sind sieben Jahr" – "The time has come and seven years have again elapsed") Because he once invoked Satan, the ghost captain is cursed to roam the sea forever without rest. An angel brought to him the terms of his redemption: Every seven years the waves will cast him upon the shore; if he can find a wife who will be true to him he will be released from his curse.

Daland wakes up and meets the stranger. The stranger hears that Daland has an unmarried daughter named Senta, and he asks for her hand in marriage, offering a chest of treasure as a gift. Tempted by gold, Daland agrees to the marriage. The southwind blows and both vessels set sail for Daland's home.

=== Act 2 ===
A group of local girls are singing and spinning in Daland's house. (Spinning chorus: "Summ und brumm, du gutes Rädchen" – "Whir and whirl, good wheel") Senta, Daland's daughter, dreamily gazes upon a gorgeous picture of the legendary Dutchman that hangs from the wall; she desires to save him. Against the will of her nurse, she sings to her friends the story of the Dutchman (Ballad with the Leitmotiv), how Satan heard him swear and took him at his word. She vows to save him by her fidelity.

The huntsman Erik, Senta's former boyfriend, arrives and hears her; the girls depart, and the huntsman, who loves the maiden, warns her, telling her of his dream, in which Daland returned with a mysterious stranger, who carried her off to sea. She listens with delight, and Erik leaves in despair.

Daland arrives with the stranger; he and Senta stand gazing at each other in silence. Daland is scarcely noticed by his daughter, even when he presents his guest as her betrothed. In the following duet, which closes the act, Senta swears to be true till death.

=== Act 3 ===
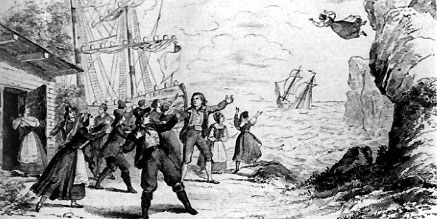
Last scene

Later in the evening, the local girls bring Daland's men food and drink. They invite the crew of the strange vessel to join in the merry-making, but in vain. The girls retire in wonder; ghostly forms appear at work upon the vessel, and Daland's men retreat in fear.

Senta arrives, followed by Erik, who reproves her for deserting him, as she had formerly loved him and vowed constancy. When the stranger, who has been listening, hears these words, he is overwhelmed with despair, as he thinks he is now forever lost. He summons his men, tells Senta of the curse, and to the consternation of Daland and his crew declares that he is "Der fliegende Holländer."

As the Dutchman sets sail, Senta throws herself into the sea, claiming that she will be faithful to him unto death. This is his salvation. The spectral ship disappears, and Senta and the Dutchman are seen ascending to heaven.
