= Carl Gottlieb Reissiger =

German musician (1798–1859)

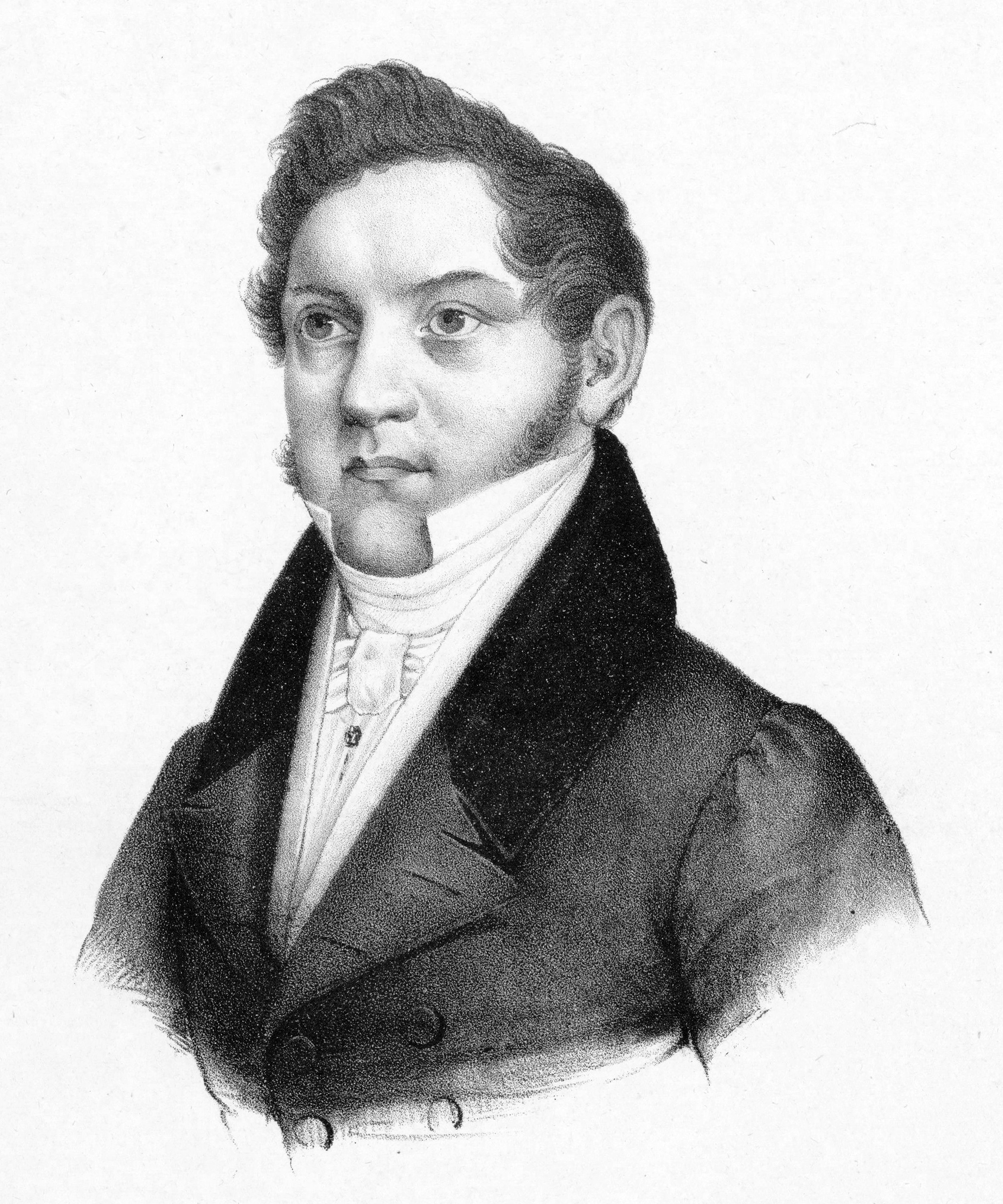
A portrait of Carl Gottlieb Reißiger

Carl Gottlieb Reißiger (also Karl Reissiger, Carl Reissiger, Karl Reißiger) (31 January 1798 – 7 November 1859) was a German Kapellmeister and composer.

== Biography ==
Born in Belzig, Reissiger attended the Thomasschule zu Leipzig and was the pupil of Johann Gottfried Schicht and Peter von Winter. In 1821, he followed the example of the young Beethoven and went to Vienna to study with Antonio Salieri and also studied theology at the University of Leipzig. Reissiger continued his musical studies in France and Italy in 1824, under the sponsorship of the Prussian Ministry of Cultural Affairs. After working for two years as the musical director of the Dresden Opera, he succeeded Carl Maria von Weber as the Kapellmeister of the Dresden Court in 1828, and would hold this office until his death in 1859. A famous piece known as Weber's Last Waltz was actually written by Reissiger (one of his Danses brillantes, op. 26) and is mentioned in Edgar Allan Poe's The Fall of the House of Usher (1839) as one of Roderick Usher's favorite pieces of music; it is also the title of a 1912 film.

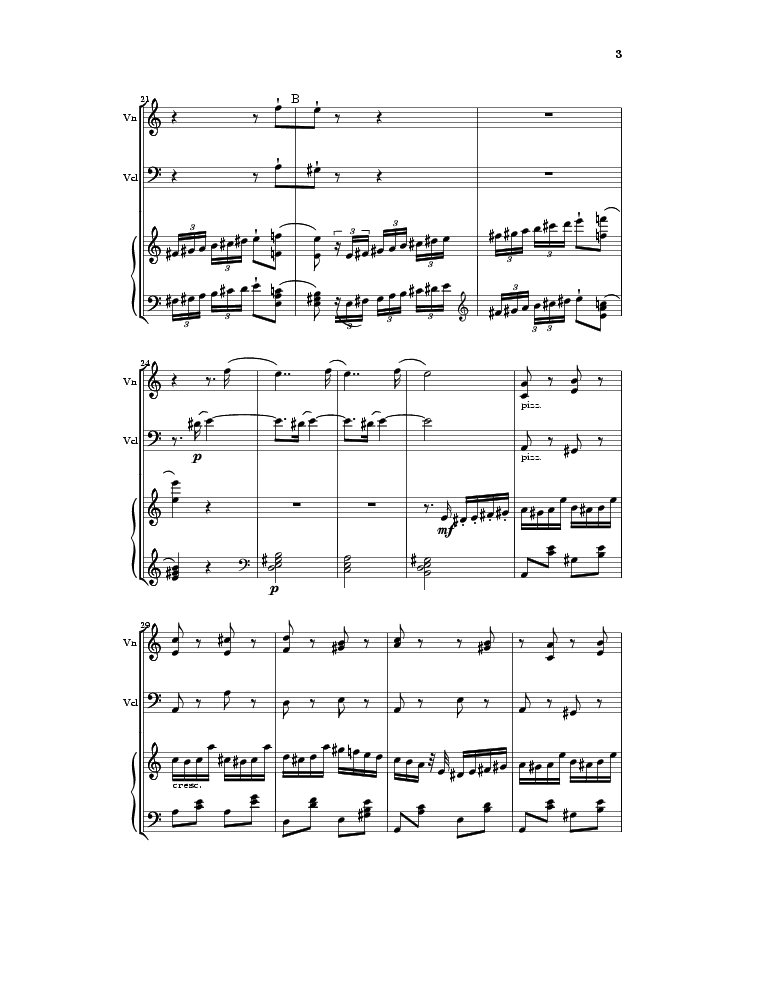
A page from Reissiger's piano trio no. 11 in A minor, Op. 125, published in 1838, bars 21-32 from finale

Reissiger left behind an extensive oeuvre that was distinguished above all by his vocal music, which included nine operas, one oratorio, nine Latin masses and another four in German, as well as sixty lieder. Besides his own works, he also won fame for conducting the premiere of Wagner's opera Rienzi in 1842. Reissiger's most successful compositions were the operas Didone, Der Ahnenschatz, Libella, Die Felsenmühle, and Adèle de Foix, and the melodrama Yelva. His great masses, composed for Catholic services at Court, carry rich melodies and warm feeling. The same can be said of his hymns, motets, and lieder, which have been included in many collections, as well as of his oratorio David.

In addition, Reissiger wrote and published various forms of orchestral and chamber music. While these works revealed his skill and inventiveness, they fell out of taste after his death. One of his leading pupils was Hermann Berens.

He was a good friend of Joachim Raff during the latter's years in Dresden. Reissiger died in Dresden.

== Bibliography ==
- Coltman, Charles (2002). Carl Gottlieb Reissiger, 1798–1859 the forgotten composer for the clarinet (DMA Thesis ed.). Denton, TX: University of North Texas. OCLC 51842990.
- Fensterer, Manfred (2002). Thematisches Verzeichnis der geistlichen Werke von Carl Gottlieb Reissiger. Köln-Rheinkassel: Dohr. ISBN 3-925366-97-0.
