= Wilhelmine Schröder-Devrient =

German operatic soprano

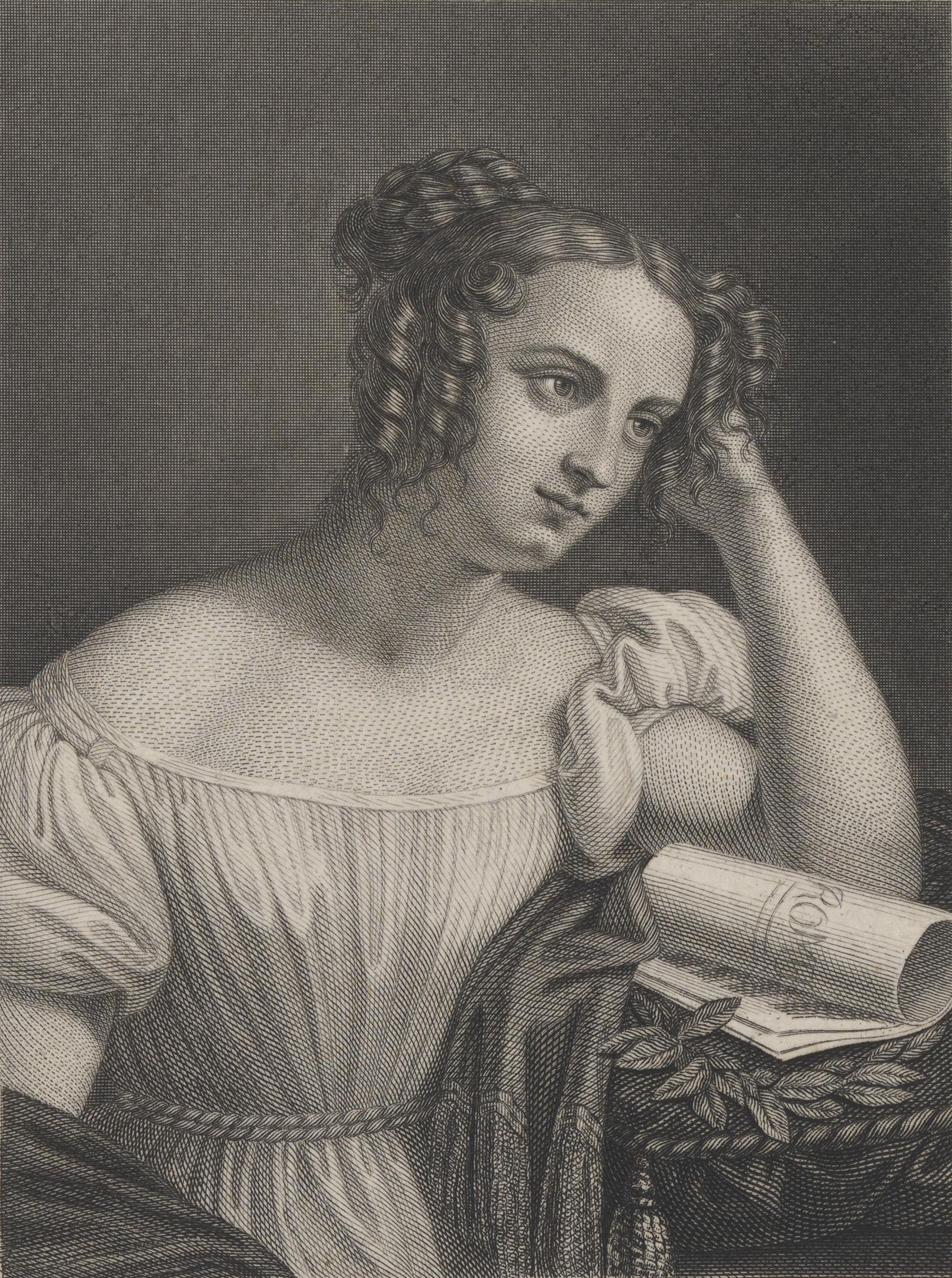
Wilhelmine Schröder-Devrient

Wilhelmine Schröder-Devrient (née Schröder; 6 December 1804 – 26 January 1860), was a German operatic soprano. As a singer, she combined a rare quality of tone with dramatic intensity of expression, which was as remarkable on the concert platform as in opera.

== Biography ==
Schröder was born in Hamburg, the daughter of the actress Sophie Schröder and the tenor Friedrich Schröder. The poet Johann Wolfgang von Goethe was her 2nd cousin.

Her first role was at the age of 15 as Aricia in Schiller's translation of Racine's Phèdre, and in 1821, aged 17, she was received with so much enthusiasm as Pamina in Mozart's The Magic Flute that her future career in opera was assured.

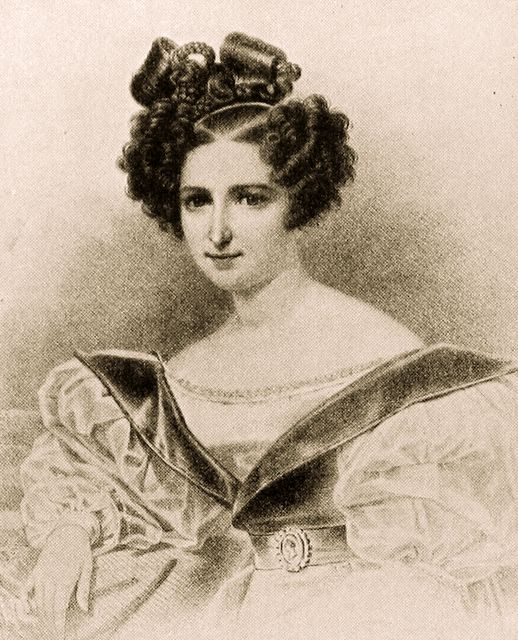
Wilhelmine Schröder-Devrient

In 1823, she married Karl Devrient, becoming known as Wilhelmine Schröder-Devrient, but separated from him in 1828. Meanwhile, she had maintained her popularity at Dresden and elsewhere. She made her first Paris appearance in 1830, and sang in London in 1833 and 1837.

Richard Wagner, born in 1813, claimed to have seen her as Leonore in Fidelio when he was 16, but this is almost certainly fanciful. He did hear (and conduct) her in numerous roles after 1834, however, and continued to laud her stage artistry right up until his essay "On Actors and Singers" (1872) which is dedicated to her memory. She created several roles for Wagner – Adriano in Rienzi, Senta in Der fliegende Holländer and Venus in Tannhäuser. Had Wagner's political profile not been compromised by his involvement with the Dresden uprising in May 1849, Schröder-Devrient would have created Elsa in Lohengrin which was advertised in 1849 as a forthcoming production in Dresden.

In 1847 she married David Oskar von Döring, an officer, but divorced him in 1848. She took part in the Revolution of 1848 and the Dresden uprising and was later imprisoned. In 1850 she married Heinrich von Bock, a wealthy Livonian land owner, who was 14 years her junior. They settled first in Trikāta, Latvia, relocating later to von Bock's ancestral home in Loodi (Kersel) in Estonia. She left her husband in the winter of 1858, planning to move to America; but her health began to deteriorate rapidly.

She died in Coburg, Germany, on 26 January 1860.

== Apocryphal memoirs ==
After her death, an erotic memoir in two volumes, Memoiren einer Sängerin (Memoirs of a Songstress), was wrongly attributed to her.
