= Miedke =

Miedke or Miedtke is a surname. Notable people with the surname include:

- Carl Miedke (1773-1839), German actor, director and playwright, husband of Charlotte and Wilhelmine
- Charlotte Miedke (1781-1806), German singer and actor, first wife of Carl
- Wilhelmine Miedke or Wilhelmine Aschenbrenner (1795-after 1834), German actress, second wife of Carl
- Friedrich Georg Leonhard Miedke (1803-1842), German actor, son of Carl and Charlotte
- Karl August Miedke or Karl August Krebs (1804-1880), German pianist, composer, conductor and Kapellmeister, son of Carl and Charlotte
- Anna Miedke or Anna Fischer-Maraffa (1806-1866), German operatic soprano, daughter of Carl and Charlotte
- Carl Miedke, member of Sam the Sham's 1961 American group The Pharaohs
