= Mary Krebs-Brenning =

German pianist

Mary Krebs-Brenning (5 December 1851 – 27 June 1900) was a German pianist.

== Life ==
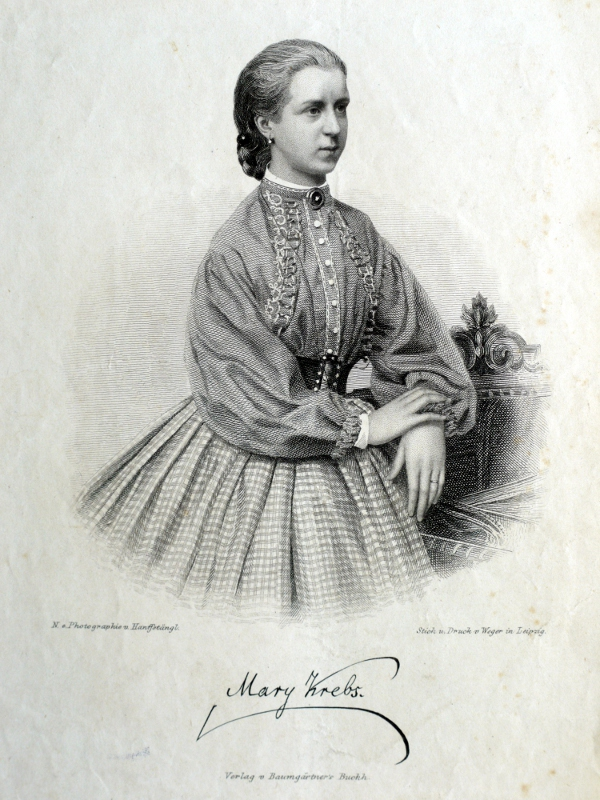
Mary Krebs-Brenning, engraving by August Weger

Born Marie Krebs on 5 December 1851 in Dresden, she was the daughter of the opera singer Aloyse Michalesi and the Royal Saxon Court Kapellmeister Karl August Krebs. Her sister was the actress Antonie Maria Krebs (1845–1918), who was married to the actor and director Fedo von Jarosch (1835–1918).

Her father taught his daughter to play the piano from the age of six. Her first concert in 1863 in the former Hotel de Saxe in Dresden was followed by numerous concerts in Leipzig, Hamburg and England.

She was considered a "child prodigy" and was appointed royal chamber virtuoso by King John of Saxony at the age of 13. In October 1870, she embarked on a concert tour to America, traversing the United States in two years and accompanying violinist Henri Vieuxtemps. Many authoritative critics of the time regarded her as the "first" German pianist of her time. According to the critics, her greatness was based on the right measure. She accompanied, among others, the soprano Adelina Patti on the piano and made music together with Anton Rubinstein as well as the Königliche Hofkapelle and the Gewerbeorchester.

Trips to England, Saint Petersburg and Moscow followed. In 1887 she married the royal equerry Theodor Brenning, withdrew increasingly from the public eye and lived in seclusion on an estate in Strehlen. She died there in June 1900 at the age of 48 and was laid to rest in the Old Catholic Cemetery in Dresden-Friedrichstadt. Her grave is designed as a stele with a portrait medallion.

== Honours ==
Already during her lifetime, the street where Krebs lived was given the name Mary-Krebs-Straße when Strehlen was incorporated into Dresden in 1892.
