= Auguste Charlotte von Kielmannsegge =

Napoleon's secret agent

- Countess
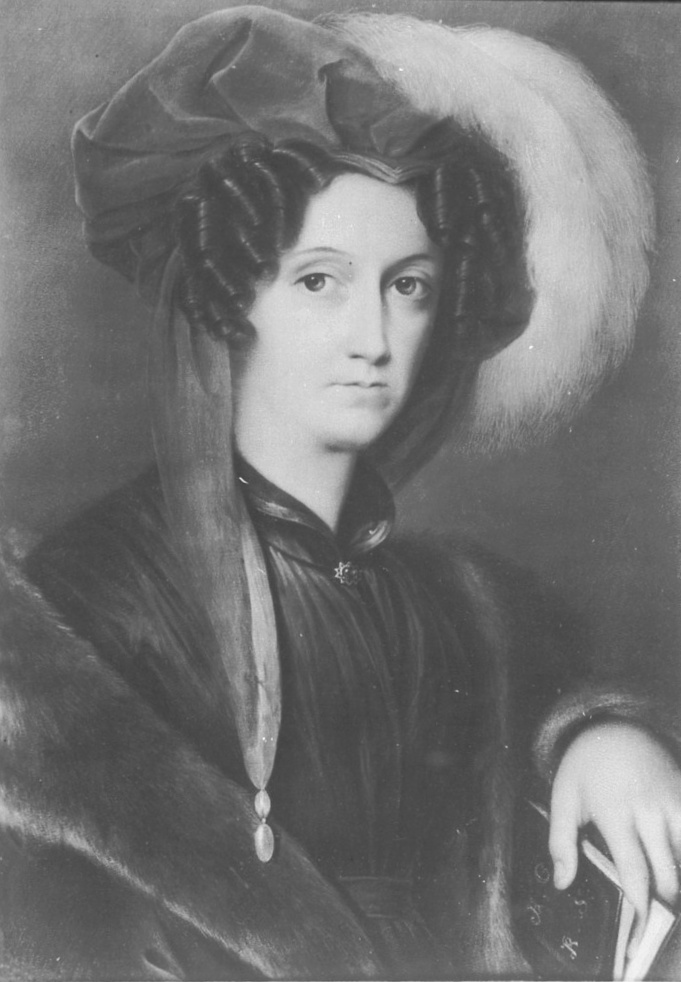
- Auguste Charlotte Countess von Kielmannsegge, portrait by August Grahl, 1828
- Born: 18 May 1777; Hermsdorf, Electorate of Saxony, Holy Roman Empire
- Died: 26 April 1863 (aged 85); Plauen, Kingdom of Saxony, German Confederation
- Father: Peter August von Schönberg
- Mother: Charlotte Dorothea Countess von Hoym

Auguste Charlotte Countess von Kielmannsegge, née von Schönberg, né von Lynar, (born May 18, 1777 in Hermsdorf near Dresden; † April 26, 1863 in Plauen near Dresden) was a Saxon noblewoman and Napoleon's secret agent.

== Life ==
=== Childhood and youth ===
The only daughter of the Saxon house marshal Peter August von Schönberg (* November 7, 1732 – September 24, 1791) and his wife Charlotte Dorothea Countess von Hoym (* January 5, 1743 – November 6, 1789) grew up at Hermsdorf Castle near Dresden, the family mostly spent the winter months in Dresden. Legend has it that her biological father was the Italian Marchese d'Agdolo, adjutant general of Prince Franz Xaver of Saxony, who was imprisoned at Königstein fortress from 1776 because of his involvement in a conspiracy against Elector Friedrich August I of Saxony.

Auguste Charlotte married Count Rochus August von Lynar (born April 17, 1773) on May 13, 1796, owner of the Lübbenau registry. The marriage was considered unhappy and ended with the early death of her husband on August 1, 1800. This gave rise to the rumor that she should have poisoned him, which she never denied herself. According to this, she is said to have poisoned her husband with fresh cherry cake out of love for Napoleon and was then condemned from afar to always wear a chain and a rope around her neck. In reality, the black collar was a gift from Napoleon.

=== Second marriage and return to Dresden ===
After the death of her first husband, she returned to Dresden. Through inheritance, she also came into the possession of the Oberlausitz manors Schmochtitz, Neusalza, Spremberg and Dürrhennersdorf, which helped her to a financially secure life. Here she married on October 10, 1802, Count Ferdinand Hans Ludolph von Kielmannsegge (born February 14, 1777, † August 19, 1856), who served as the Hanoverian envoy in Saxony was active. Due to the paternal inheritance of the above-mentioned properties in Upper Lusatia, Auguste Charlotte von Kielmannsegge was the landlady and judge as well as church patroness of the small Saxon town of Neusalza and the neighboring village of Spremberg, today Neusalza-Spremberg. The couple moved to Hanover a little later. Personal and political differences (the Count was a staunch opponent of Napoleon) led to the separation as early as 1809, and nine years later to the divorce. After the separation, Auguste Charlotte von Kielmansegge lived in Dresden again.

=== Relations with Napoleon Bonaparte ===
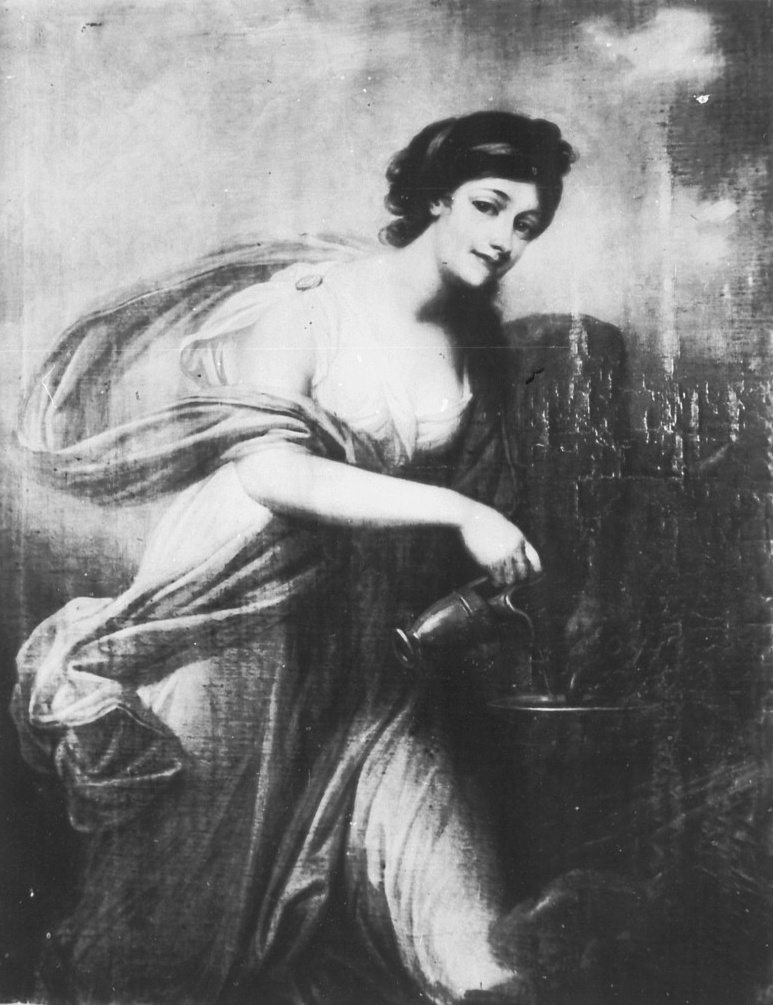
Auguste Charlotte Countess von Kielmannsegge, portrait by Josef Grassi, 1800

Her enthusiasm for Napoleon began in 1797, when the Countess traveled to Italy with the painter Josef Grassi. Later she specifically sought contact and visited the emperor in Saint-Cloud. At times she also lived in Paris. She was also in contact with the French Police Minister Joseph Fouché and is said to have worked as an agent for the French secret police herself. Due to her social contacts with the Talleyrand house, Auguste von Kielmannsegge proved to be the most important informant for Napoleon. Over time, the spying became conspicuous there and warnings were given about "this great hulking woman from Kielmannsegge", who often instigated intrigues in order to obtain information about Napoleon's opponents.

After the fall of Napoleon, she campaigned for his return from exile and, according to later statements by a chambermaid, is said to have visited him on Elba as well. From Saxon government files it emerges that Countess Kielmannsegge was under the surveillance of the authorities for a long time and was considered a politically dangerous person. A private trip to contact the Napoleon family was prevented in 1818 at the instigation of the Saxon ambassador in Vienna, Count Friedrich Albrecht von der Schulenburg. In 1822 she converted to the Catholic faith.

It is part of the realm of legend that the countess is said to have had an illegitimate son with Napoleon. The "Dresdner Findling", a later wage clerk by the name of Ernst Graf, had given himself the name Napoleon Bonaparte and tried to prove his alleged ancestry through a brochure and memos. Desperate because his alleged mother did not recognize him, he drowned himself in the Elbe in 1864/65.

=== Stay in Bavaria ===
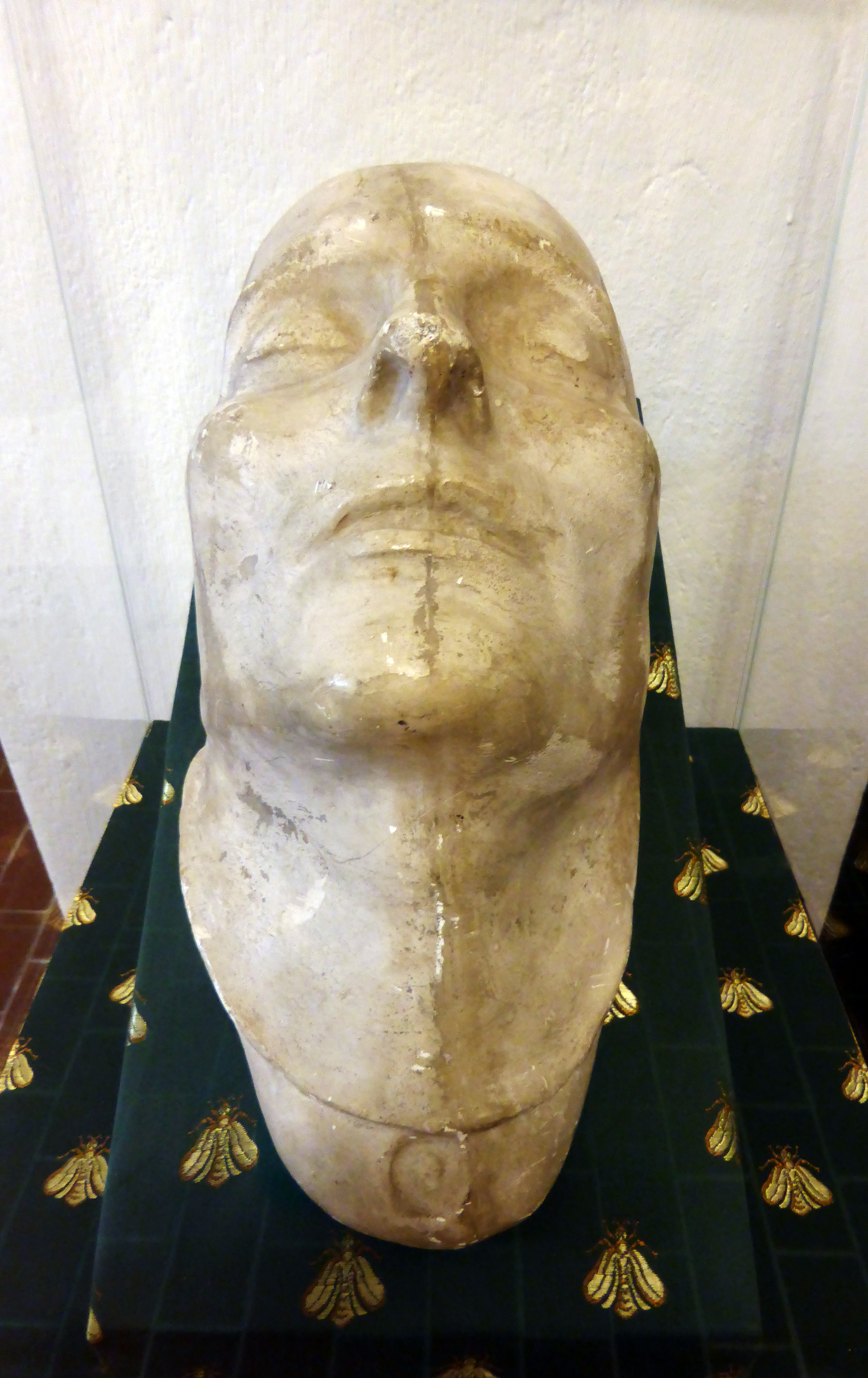
Napoleon's death mask by Francesco Antommarchi from the collection of Auguste Charlotte von Kielmannsegge.

In 1829, Auguste Charlotte von Kielmannsegge acquired the estate of Oberpöring and Niederpöring and on April 20, 1830, together with her daughter Natalie, she was accepted into the count class of the Bavarian aristocratic registers. Natalie von Kielmansegge became lady of honor of the Order of Theresa in 1832.

=== Last years of life in Dresden ===
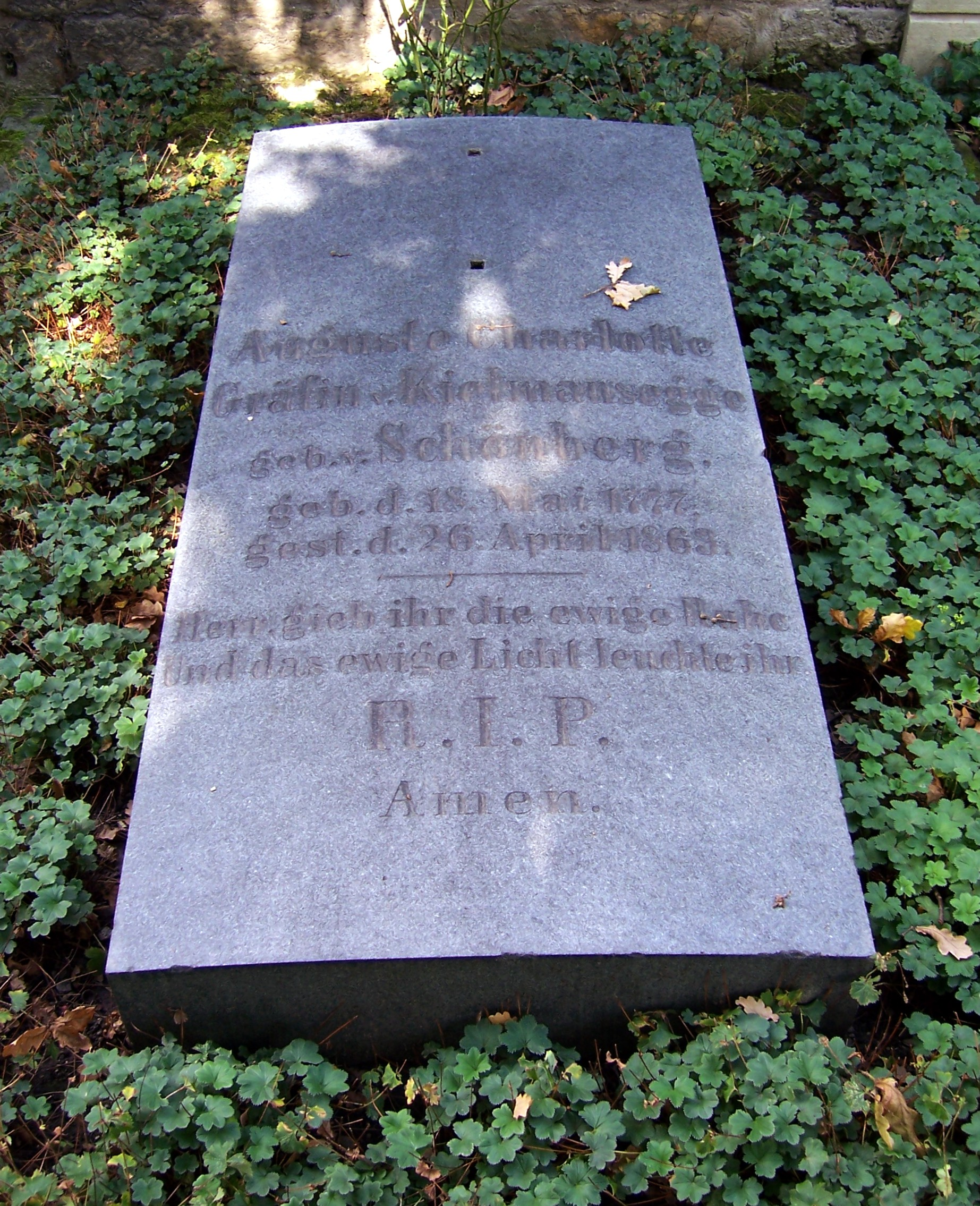
Grave in the Old Catholic Cemetery in Dresden.

From 1833 Auguste Charlotte von Kielmannsegge lived in Dresden again. In 1840 she moved into the so-called Wasserschlösschen in the Reisewitz Garden on the Weißeritz in the Plauen Grund. Here she dealt with literature, natural history and collecting art objects as well as fortune telling using a "mirror of the earth". In addition, she redesigned her home into a private memorial for Napoleon with numerous paintings and relics. In 1848 she again played a mysterious political role and made contact with Robert Blum's widow . She received financial support from her and also visited her in her Dresden house.

She spent the last years of her life, withdrawn and shrouded in mystery in the little water castle. When she died, she left three legitimate children and a son Heinrich, who was judged to be her but not recognized by her. She was buried in the Old Catholic Cemetery, Dresden, the grave has been preserved to this day.

=== Descendants ===
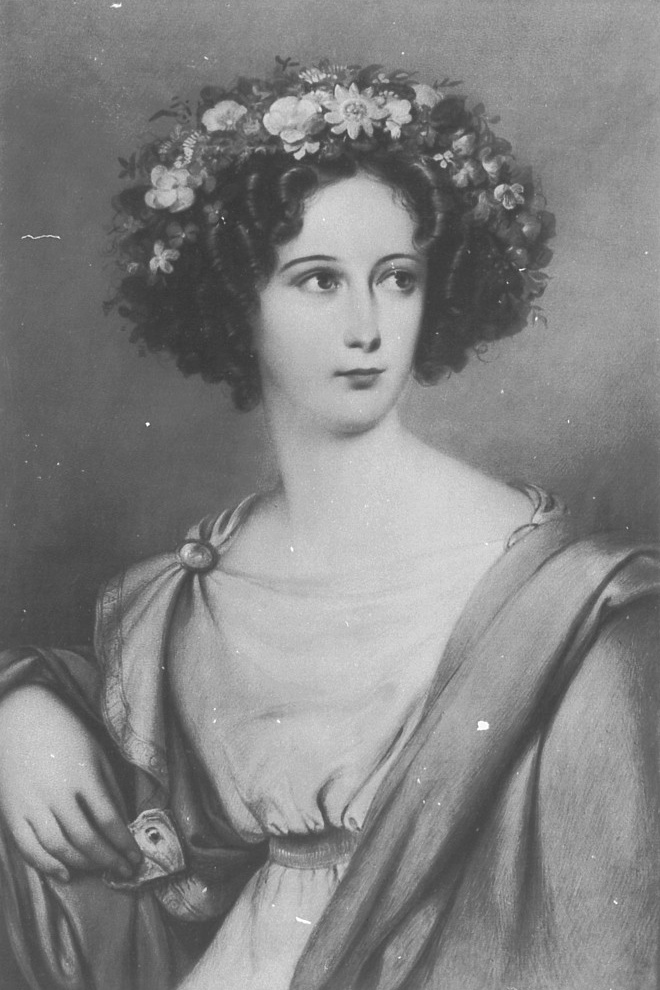
Natalie Countess von Kielmannsegge, portrait by August Grahl, 1828

Children from first marriage with Rochus August Graf zu Lynar:

- Rochus Carl (February 4, 1797 – September 4, 1801)
- Rochus Hermann (February 4, 1797 – December 31, 1878)

⚭ 1821 Countess Mathilde Sophie Friederike Wilhelmine Henriette von Voss (* December 1, 1803; † January 19, 1838)
⚭ Marie Charlotte von der Marwitz (March 5, 1821 – January 27, 1895)

- Luise Alexandra (born November 3, 1799 – † January 12, 1804)

Children from second marriage with Ferdinand Hans Ludolph von Kielmannsegge:

- Natalie Charlotte (June 25, 1803 – November 12, 1883). She converted to the Catholic Church and entered the order of the English Misses in 1841.
- Alfred (born September 24, 1804 – † June 7, 1862)

⚭ Luise Zimmermann (born October 29, 1818 – † August 26, 1887)

== Works ==
- Gertrude Aretz (Ed.): Memoirs of Countess Kielmannsegge on Napoleon I. P. Aretz, Dresden 1927
