= Rolf Kleinert =

German conductor. (1911–1975)

Rolf Kleinert (24 November 1911 – 20 January 1975) was a German conductor.

== Life and work ==
Born in Dresden, Kleinert, the son of a porcelain maker, studied violin, piano at the orchestral school of the Saxon Staatskapelle Dresden from 1931 to 1933 and conducting with Fritz Busch. Other teachers were Kurt Striegler, Hermann Ludwig Kutzschbach and Johannes Schneider-Marfels. He also played the oboe and trumpet. He first worked as a bandmaster at the Freiberg Theatre and as musical director and conductor of the symphony concerts at the Brandenburg/H Stadttheater. In 1941, Kleinert had to interrupt his career because he was drafted into the Wehrmacht. At the end of the war, he was taken prisoner in France. From 1947 to 1949, he conducted the MDR Symphony Orchestra at the Leipzig radio station. From 1949 to 1952, he took over as music director at the Görlitz Theatre. The German Democratic Republic first performance of the Polish national opera Halka was initiated and performed by him.

In 1952, he began a long-standing collaboration with the Rundfunk-Sinfonieorchester Berlin. First as 1st conductor alongside the chief conductor Hermann Abendroth. After his death in 1956, Kleinert led the orchestra. In 1959, Kleinert was appointed general music director in the GDR and took over as chief conductor of the Berlin Radio Symphony Orchestra. In 1960, he received the title of professor. Due to the construction of the Berlin Wall in 1961, the orchestra lost a third of its musicians. The orchestra was on the verge of disbanding. Kleinert and Hanns Eisler fought vehemently for the orchestra's existence. Through his intensive commitment in the search for suitable musicians, he succeeded in making the orchestra playable again and preserving its specific sound. Concert tours with the orchestra took Kleinert to Italy, England, West Germany, the Soviet Union, Poland and Bulgaria. He was repeatedly invited by the National Orchestra of Chile, the Philharmonic Orchestras of Belgrade, Leningrad (Petersburg), Moscow, the Czech Republic, Riga, Budapest, Bratislava, Cairo and the RSO Helsinki to guest conduct.

Kleinert received the Patriotic Order of Merit and the National Prize of the German Democratic Republic.

In 1972, Kleinert fell ill and had to give up conducting. He died in 1975 in Berlin, aged 63, and was buried in the Striesener Friedhof in Dresden.

There are about 800 recordings conducted by him in the Deutsches Rundfunkarchiv conducted by him.

== Significance ==
"Kleinert was a conductor of the 'true to the works' school, coming from the tradition of Leibowitz, Toscanini and Scherchen. He knew how to elicit tempo, accuracy, clarity and dancing elegance from every score." Dr. M. Meyer, in Rundfunk Sinfonieorchester 1923-1998. An excellent percussion technique, a great sense of sound and an absolute ear were Kleinert's essential qualities.

== Recordings (selection) ==
- Beethoven: Konzert für Klavier und Orchester Nr. 2 B-Dur, op.19, Sol. D.Zechlin/RSOB 1965
- Beethoven: Sinfonie Nr. 7 A-Dur, op.92/RSOB 1965
- Brahms: Konzert für Violine, Violoncello und Orchester, a-Moll, op.102 Sol.Garay, Aldulescu/RSOB 1966
- Paul Dessau: Sinfonie No. 2 (1943)/RSOB 1962
- Dessau: Bach-Variation/RSOB 1970
- Edward Elgar: Enigma-Variations op.36/RSOB 1971
- Fritz Geißler: Kammersinfonie „45“/RSOB 1968
- Ottmar Gerster: Konzert für Klavier und Orchester, Sol.S, Stöckigt/RSOB 1959
- Paul Hindemith: Philharmonisches Konzert (Variationen für Orchester 1932)/RSOB 1968
- Rolf Liebermann: Concerto für Jazzband und Sinfonieorchester/RSOB u. Tanzorchester des Berliner Rundfunk 1966
- Witold Lutosławski: Konzert für Orchester/RSOB 1967
- Étienne-Nicolas Méhul: Sinfonie Nr. 1/ RSOB 1954
- Shostakovich: Concerto in C minor for Piano, Trumpet, and String Orchestra op.35/S. Kootz, Krug/RSOB
- Schumann: Symphony No. 3 (Rhenish) RSOB 1971
- Leo Spies: Violin Concerto (1953) Sol.E.Morbitzer/RSOB 1955
