= Old Catholic Cemetery, Dresden =

Oldest Roman Catholic Cemetery in Dresden

Alter Katholischer Friedhof
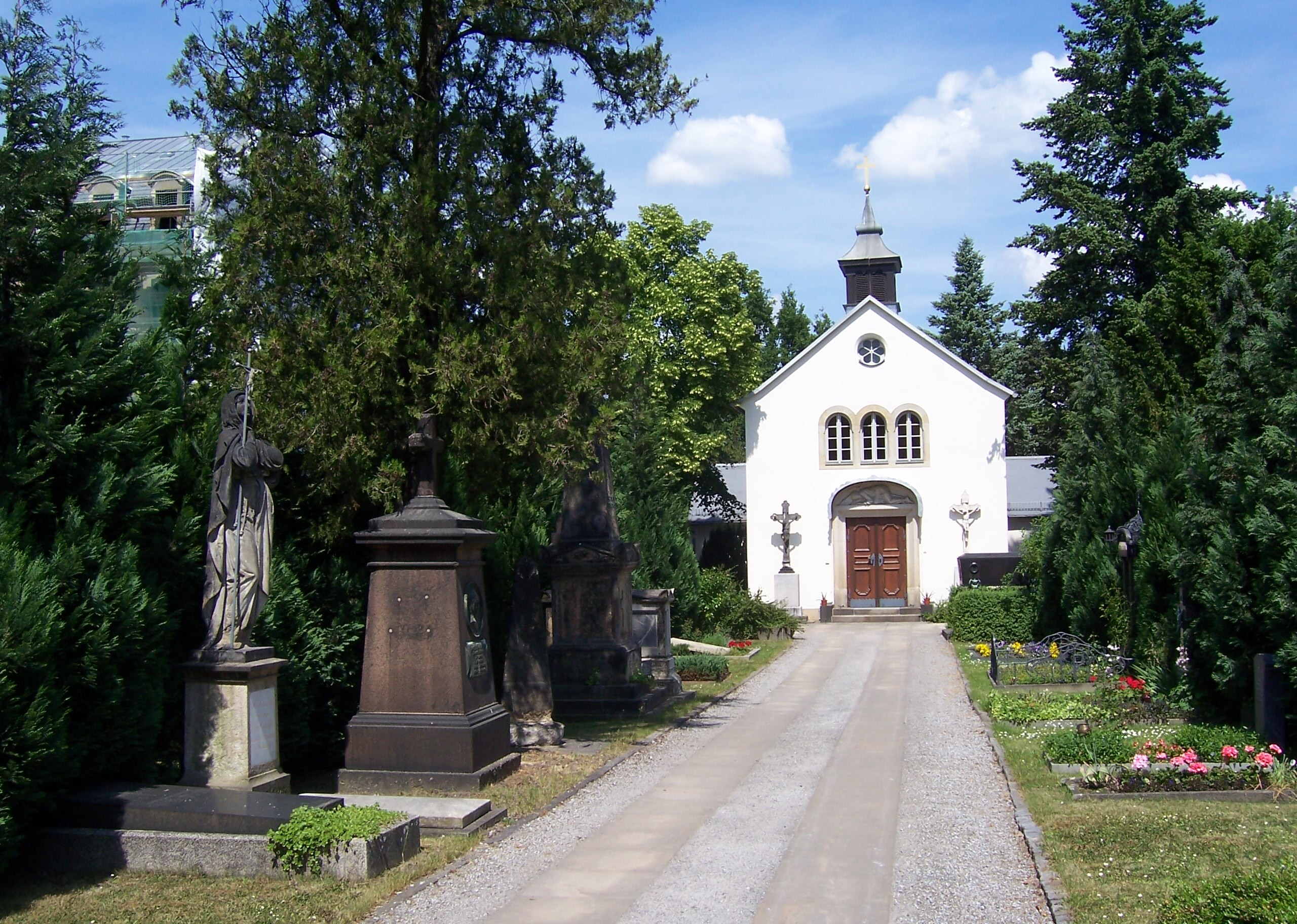
- Chapel of the Old Catholic Cemetery in Dresden
- Interactive map of Alter Katholischer Friedhof

Details
- Established: 1720
- Location: Dresden
- Country: Germany
- Coordinates: 51.0603°N 13.7193°E
- Type: Catholic cemetery
- Owned by: Roman Catholic Diocese of Dresden–Meissen
- Size: 1.1 ha (2.7 acres)
- Find a Grave: Alter Katholischer Friedhof

The Old Catholic Cemetery (German: Alter Katholischer Friedhof) consecrated in 1720, is one of the oldest cemeteries in Dresden, Saxony. It was the first Catholic burial ground established in the town after the Reformation. It is located in the Friedrichstadt district, on the left bank of the Elbe. Due to the vast number of baroque, rococo and neoclassical tombs and monuments, the designated historic landmark is one of the most culturally and historically important cemeteries in the Dresden region.

== History and description ==
The cemetery was founded during the reign of Augustus II the Strong in 1720–1721, who converted to Roman Catholicism in order to be elected king of the Polish–Lithuanian Commonwealth. As a Catholic ruler of a Protestant land, there was suddenly an increasing Catholic presence in the royal court of Dresden, with the influx of Catholic artists, scholars and officials coming to the capital of Saxony which grew even larger after his son Augustus III of Poland's marriage to the Maria Josepha of Austria. Maria Josepha was raised as a staunch Catholic and had her marriage contract declared that "all of her male and female servants should be buried in their own consecrated churchyard, according to the rites of the Roman Catholic church."

The cemetery was located outside of city limits at the time it was founded to avoid an escalation of the public controversy due to sectarian conflicts, since Saxon law in the strictly Protestant city of Dresden in the 17th century prohibited the burial of non-Protestants, including the Jews and Catholics, inside the city walls. At first, the burial ground was intended to inter the remains of Catholics, primarily from Maria Josepha's court, her servants, the local nobility of Catholics from other German states, as well as from Italy and France. Many members of the Polish nobility, after the uprisings of 1830–1831, are also buried there. At the beginning, it was prohibited to build any chapels or crypts on the cemetery ground.

The first burial took place on February 16, 1724, when Johann Carl Philipp Molteno, an Italian actor was buried in the Catholic cemetery, followed by twenty-seven more burials that year.

On September 9, 1738, by the decree of Friedrich August II, all Catholics living within the borders of Dresden were permitted to be buried in the Catholic cemetery, as well as the Catholic residents of Neustadt, Leipzig and other neighboring towns were also allowed to find their final resting place in Dresden's Catholic Cemetery. As a result, the cemetery land became inadequate and therefore it was expanded in 1740 and 1742. In 1842, Bishop Franz Laurenz Mauermann expanded the cemetery for a last time to its current size of 11,000 m^{2}. A cemetery church named St. Michael's Chapel dedicated to Saint Michael the Archangel was built on the new cemetery ground and was consecrated on September 7, 1842. In 1914, the chapel was expanded by an extension to make room for the installation of the Crucifixion scene depicting The Descent from the Cross by sculptor Balthasar Permoser and a portal with a relief of Christ Carrying the Cross by Matthias Corr. Next to the entrance, there are two memorial crosses erected to the memory of the members of the Wettin royal family. In 1995, the gatehouse and the cemetery walls were extensively renovated.

== Notable burials ==
List is sorted in order of the year of death.

- Balthasar Permoser (1651-1732), among the leading sculptors of his generation
- Jan Dismas Zelenka (1679–1745), Czech composer and musician of the Baroque period
- Giovanni Battista Casanova (1730-1795), Italian painter and printmaker of the Neoclassic period
- Gerhard von Kügelgen (1772–1820), painter
- Carl Maria von Weber (1786-1826), composer, conductor, virtuoso pianist, guitarist, and critic of the early Romantic period
- Friedrich Schlegel (1772–1829), poet, literary critic, philosopher, philologist, and Indologist
- Kazimierz Brodziński (1791–1835), Polish Romantic poet
- Johann Centurius Hoffmannsegg (1766–1849), botanist, entomologist and ornithologist
- Auguste Charlotte von Kielmannsegge (1777-1863), noblewoman and Napoleon's secret agent
- Franziska Sontag (1788–1865), operatic soprano and stage actress
- Karl August Krebs (1804–1880), pianist, composer, conductor and Kapellmeister
- Theobald von Oer (1807–1885), painter, illustrator and etcher
- Josef Tichatschek (1807-1886), Bohemian opera singer highly regarded by Richard Wagner
- Ernst Julius Hähnel (1811–1891), sculptor and professor at the Dresden Academy of Fine Arts
- Mary Krebs-Brenning (1851–1900), pianist
- Aloyse Michalesi (1824–1904), operatic contralto, mother of Mary Krebs-Brenning
- Ferdinand Pauwels (1830-1904), Belgian history painter
- Edmund Kretschmer (1830–1908), organist and composer
- Irene von Chavanne (1863–1938), Austrian operatic contralto
- Rudolf Bockelmann (1892-1958), dramatic baritone and Kammersänger
- Kurt Striegler (1886–1958), composer and director

== Gallery ==
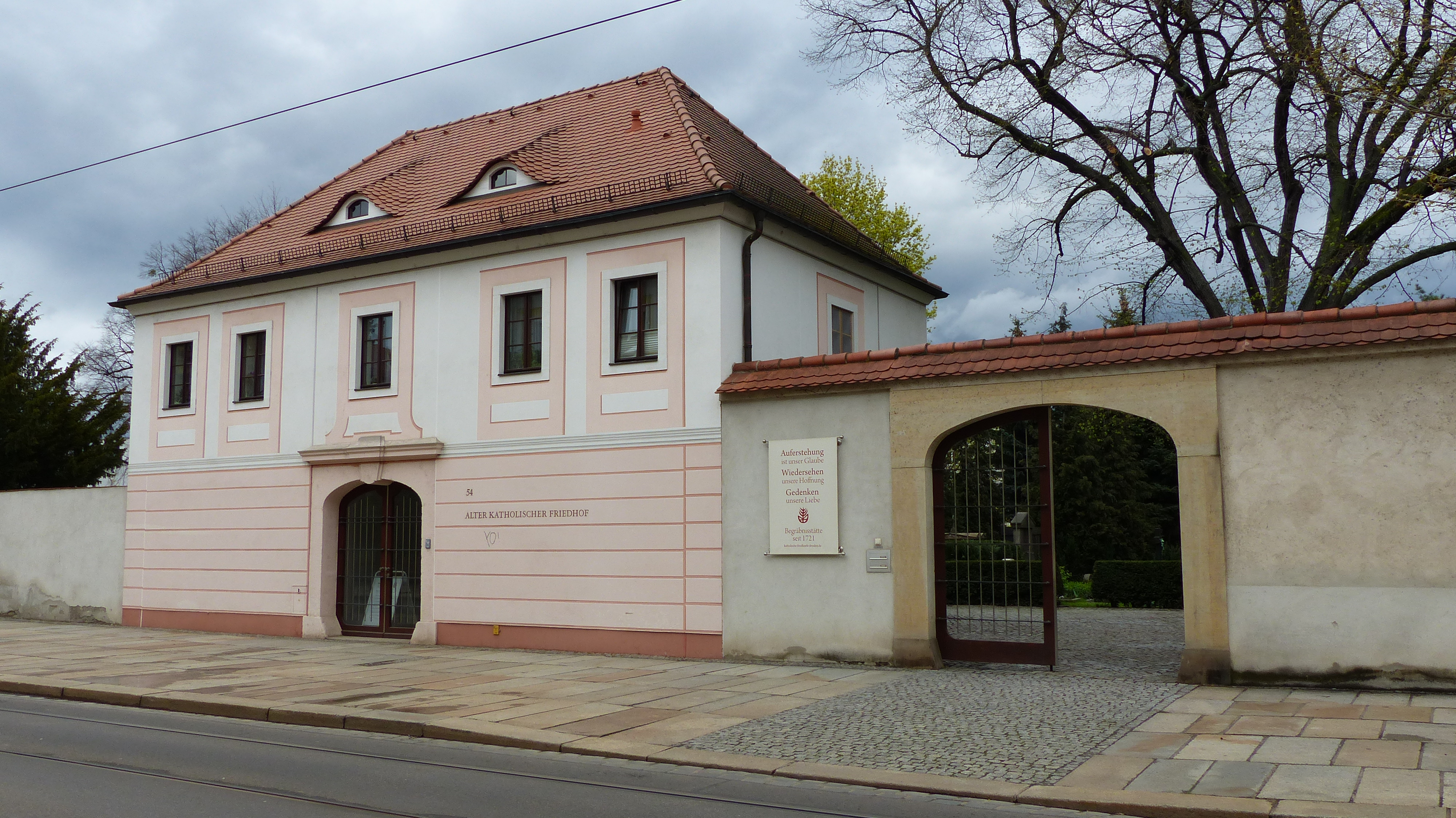
Entrance to the Old Catholic Cemetery on Friedrichstraße 54

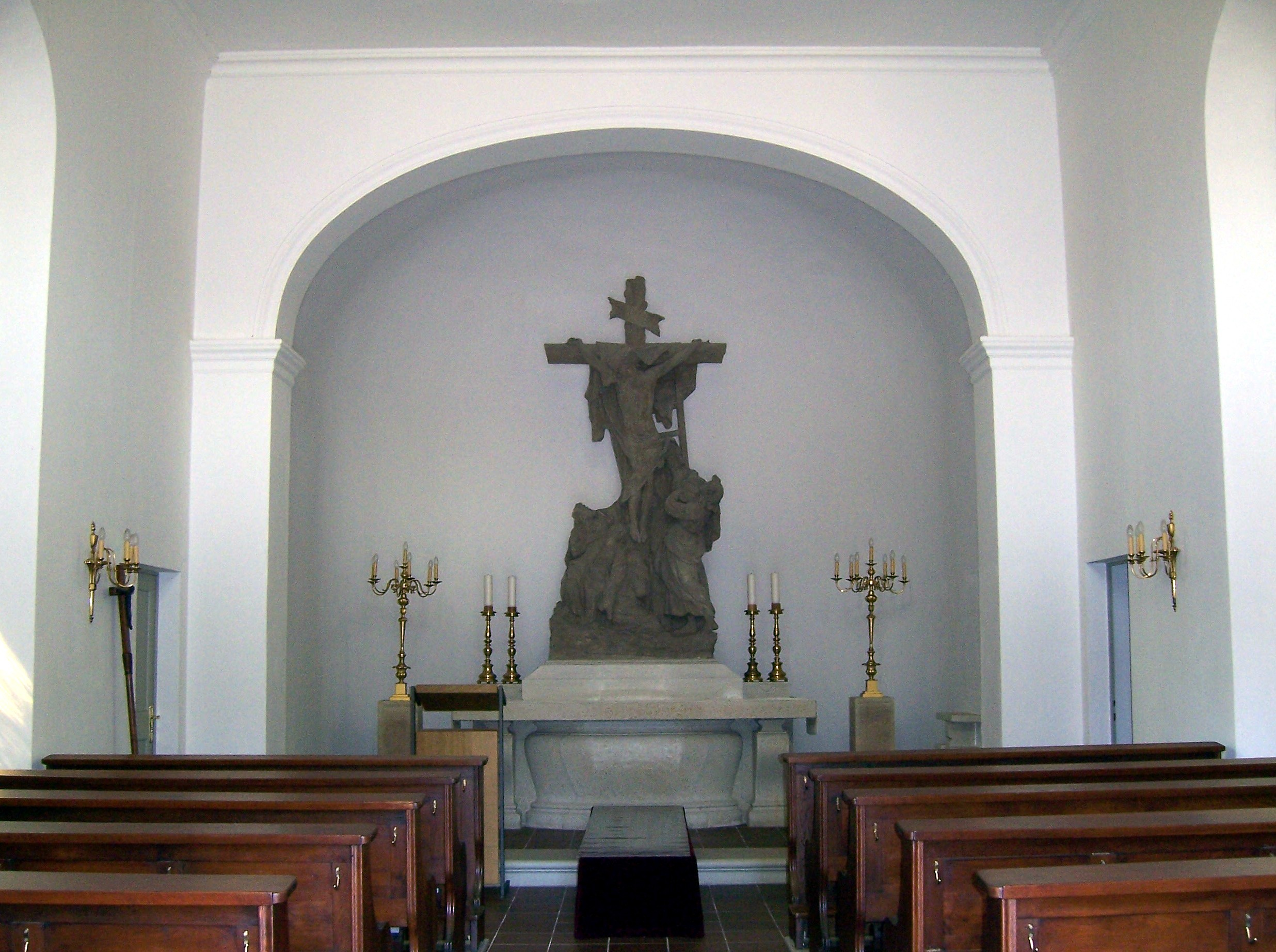
Crucifixion group by Balthasar Permoser

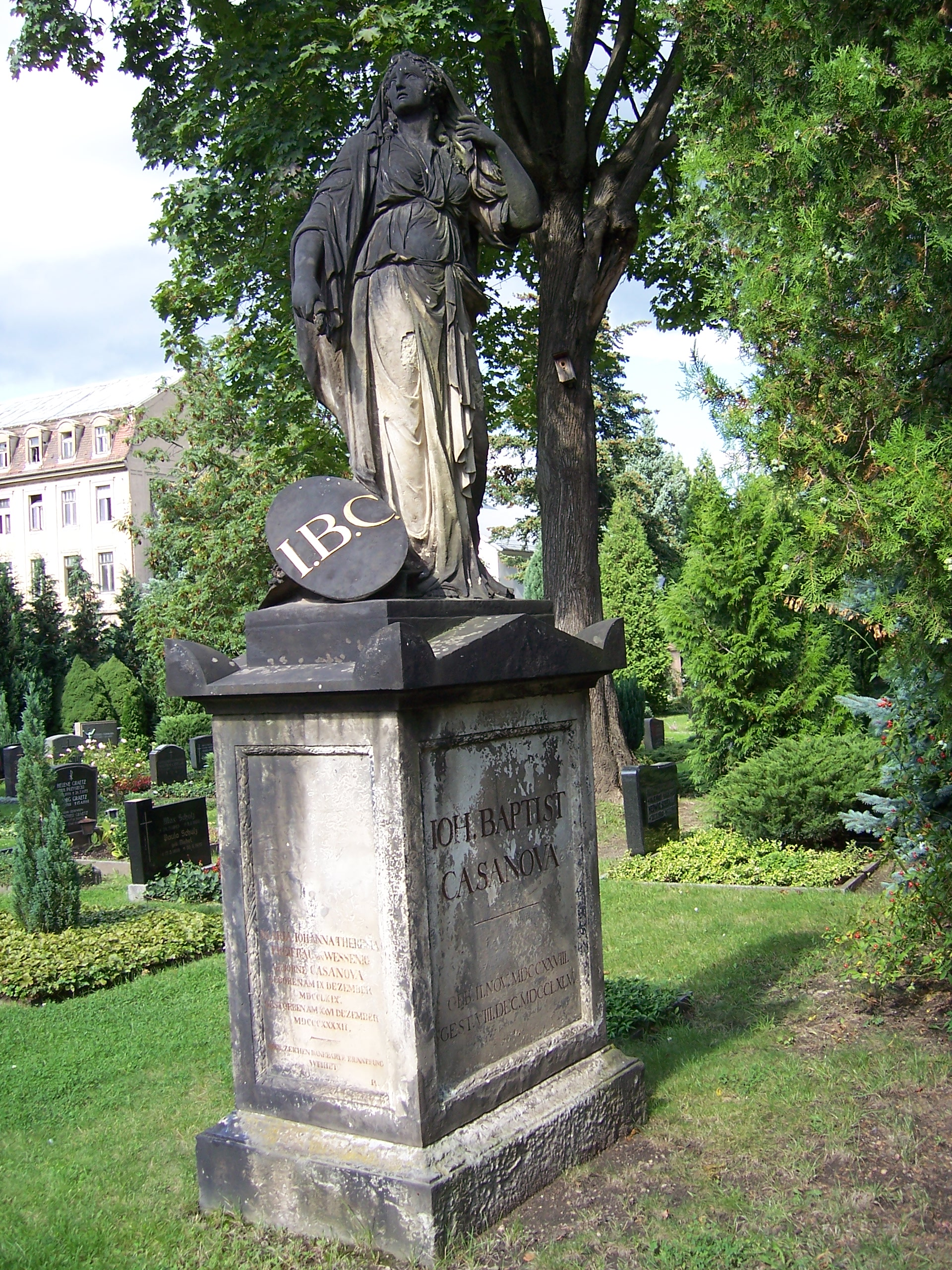
Grave monument of Giovanni Battista Casanova

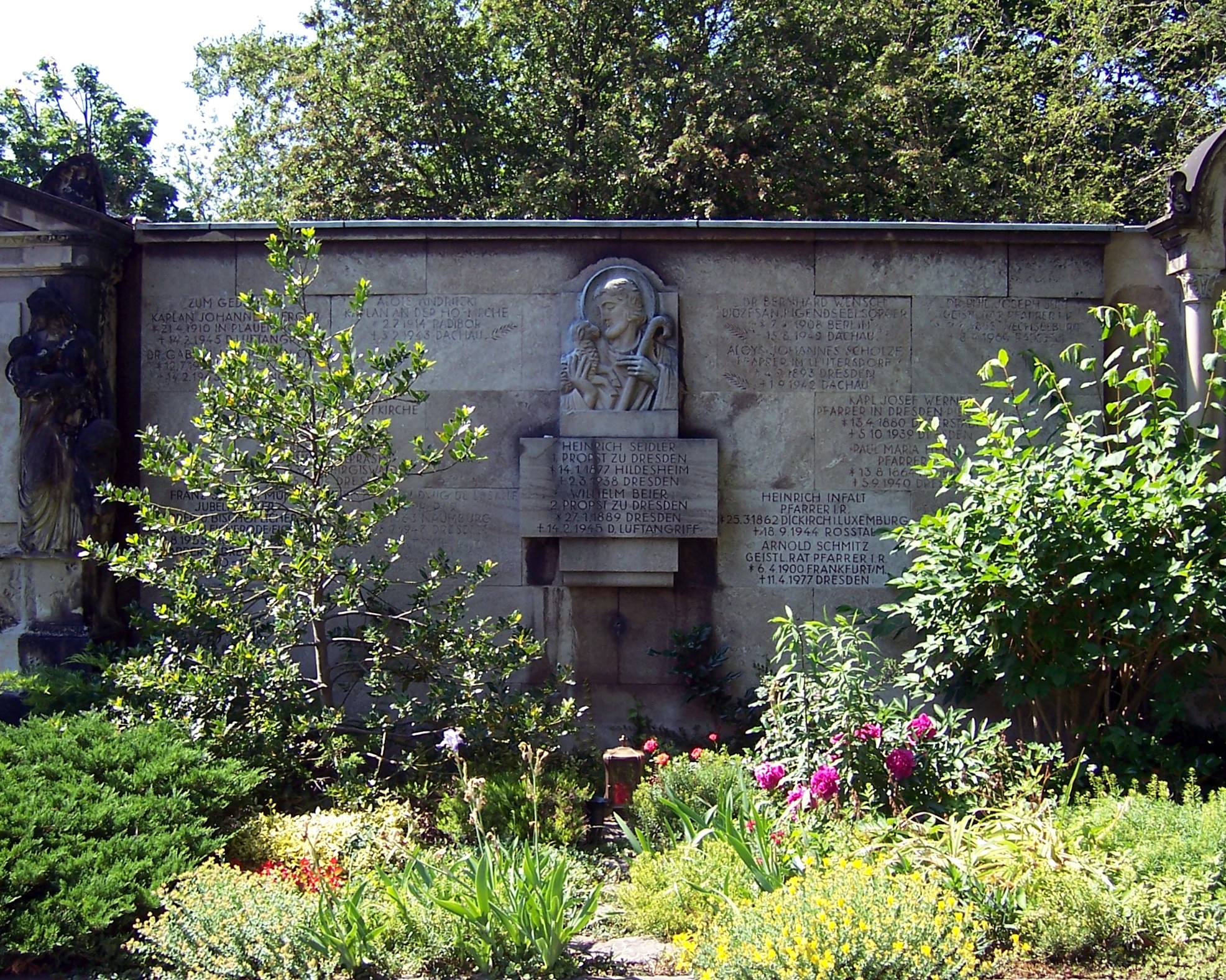
Burial vault of the priests

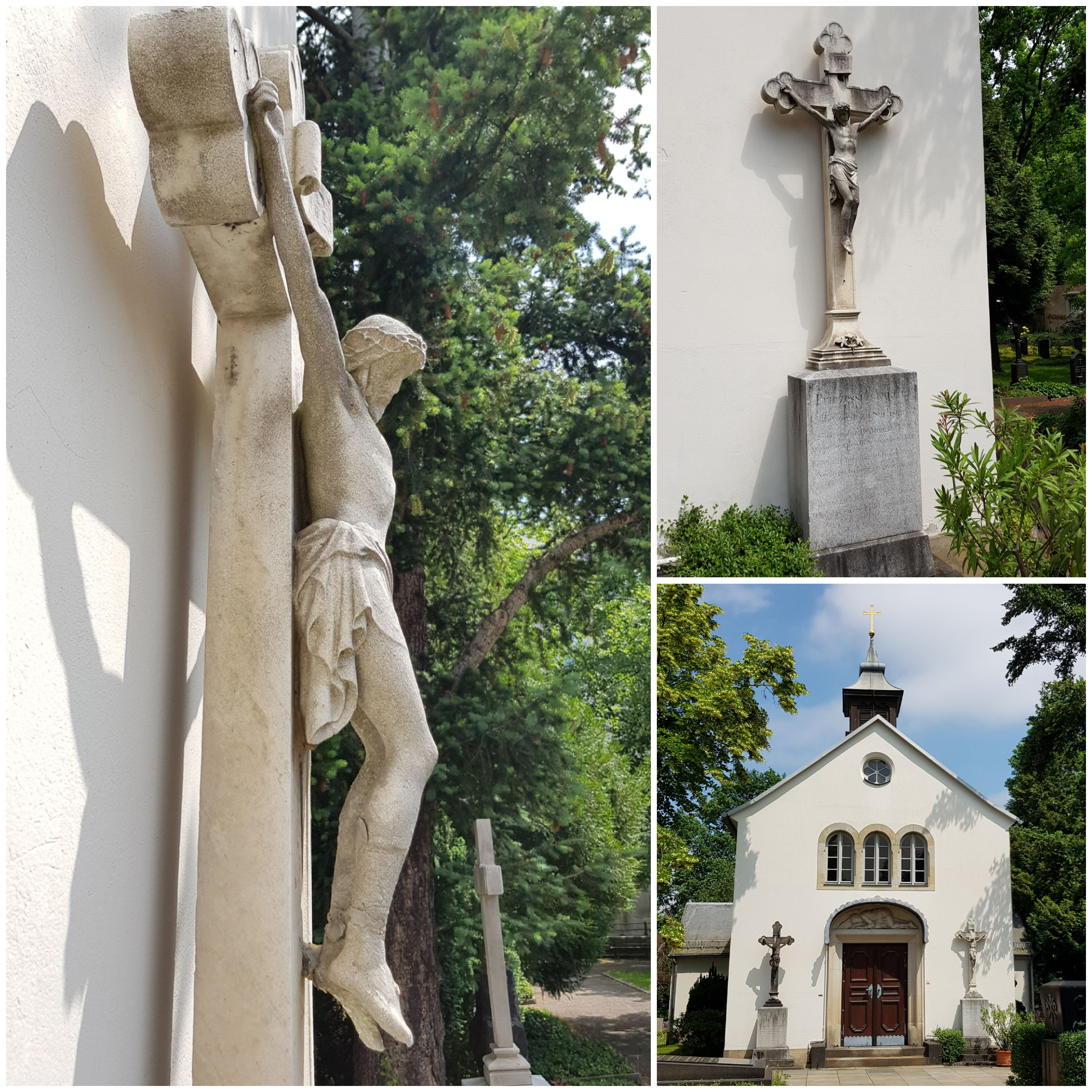
Cemetery chapel dedicated to Saint Michael the Archangel

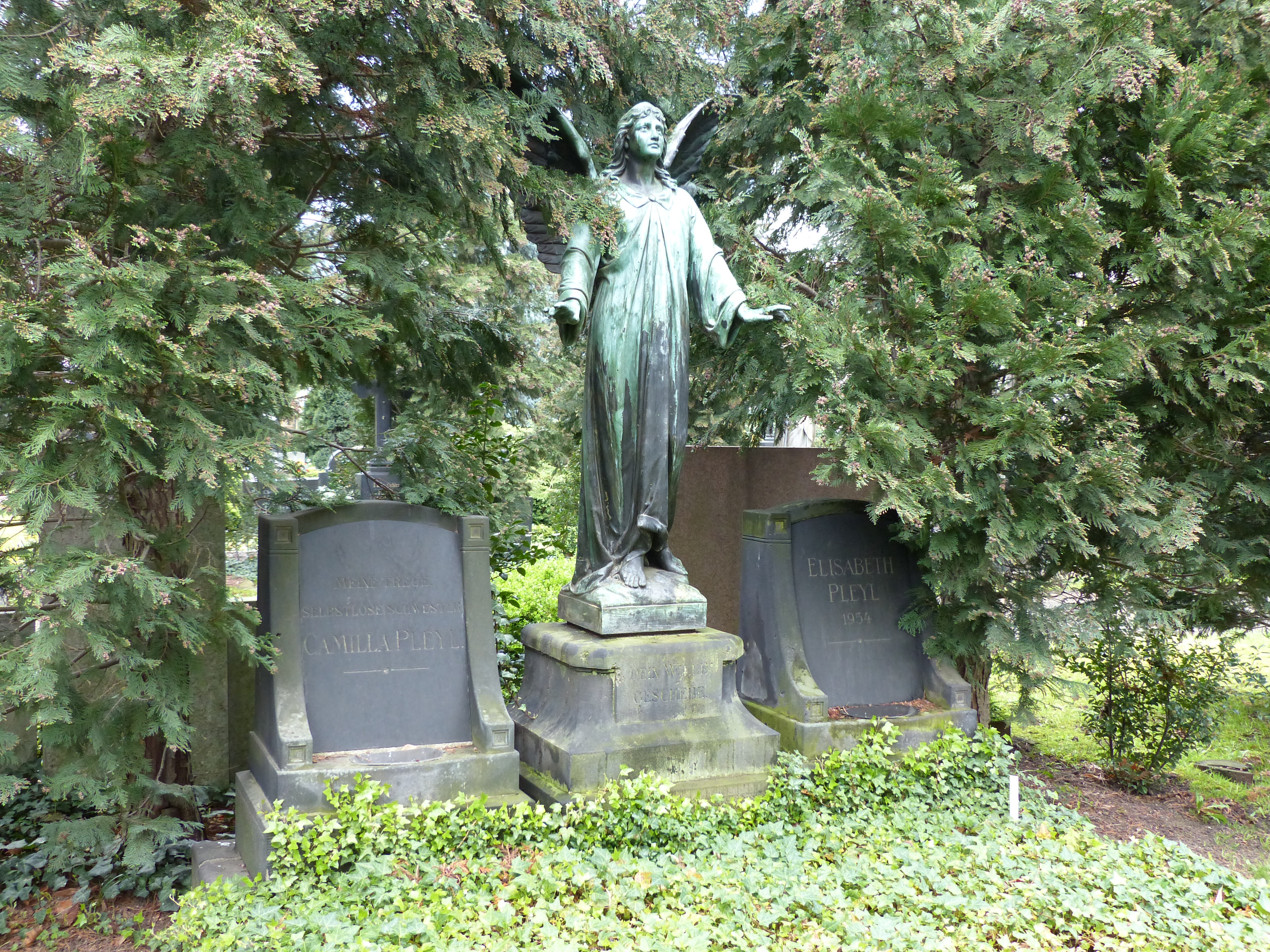
Angel of the Resurrection
