= Franziska Sontag =

German soprano and actress (1787/9–1865)

Franziska Sontag (née Martloff or Markloff) (2 January 1787/89 – 10 April 1865) was a German operatic soprano and stage actress.

== Life ==
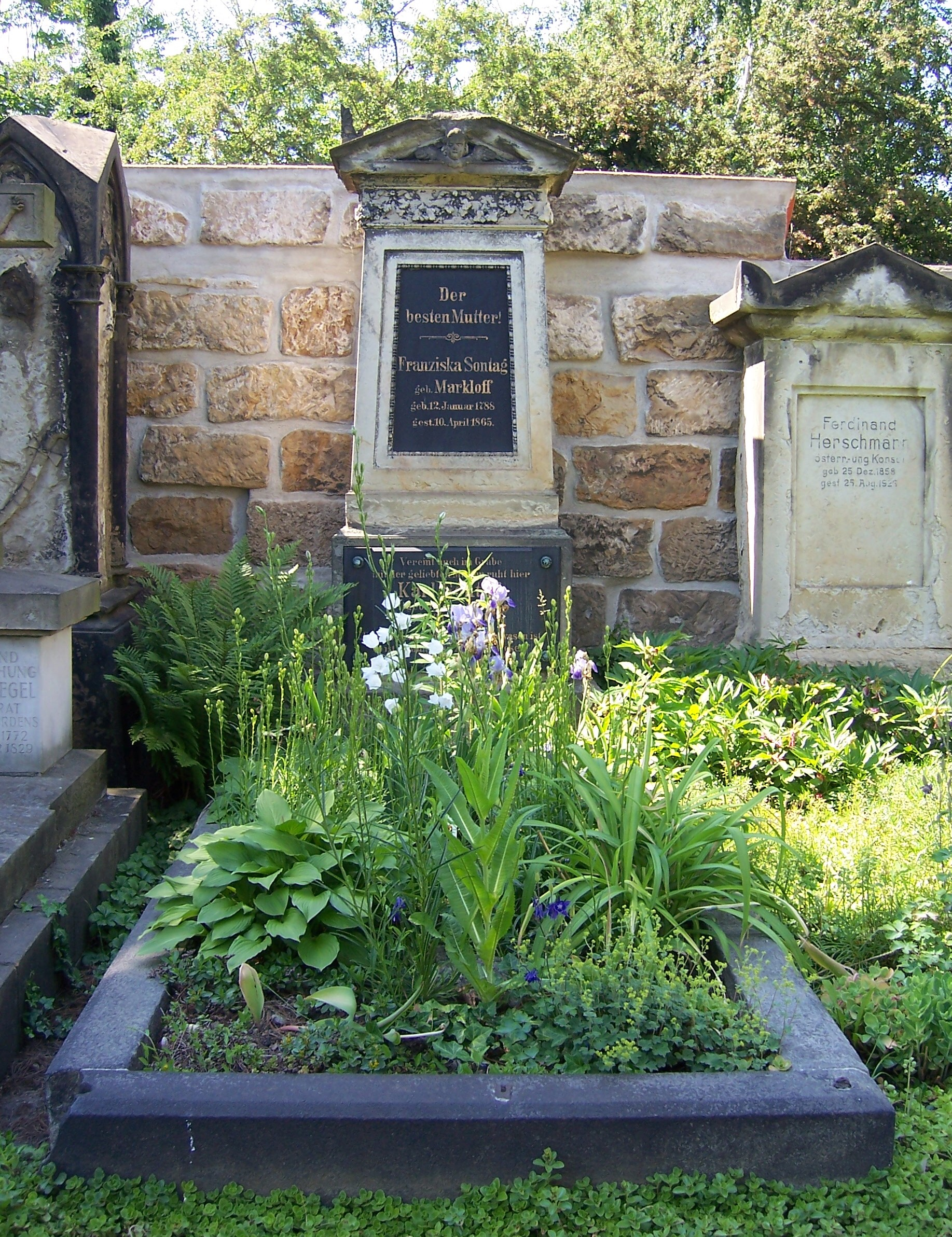
Franziska Sontag's grave in the Old Catholic Cemetery, Dresden

Martloff was born in Heddernheim on 2 January 1787 or 1789. She was the daughter of an electoral official and was already on stage at the age of twelve. She received her first engagement at the Staatstheater Mainz and from there changed to the Theater Koblenz.

Between 1812 and 1814 Martloff appeared at the Staatstheater Darmstadt and could be seen there together with August Wilhelm Iffland. In 1815 she went to the State Opera in Prague and stayed there until 1824. In time she replaced her colleague Sophie Schröder as the "first actress".

From 1824 followed extensive guest tours to Vienna and Berlin. Martloff married her colleague, the actor Franz Sontag, and had two daughters with him, Henriette and Nina, both of whom later also went to the stage. Their son Karl Sontag became an actor and playwright.

In 1837, Sontag retired from the stage and settled in Dresden. She died there on 10 April 1865 at age 77 and found her last resting place at the Old Catholic Cemetery in Dresden.

== Roles ==
- Zerline – Fra Diavolo (Daniel-François-Esprit Auber)
- Thekla – Wallensteins Tod (Friedrich Schiller)
- Portia – The merchant of Venice (William Shakespeare)
- Recha – Nathan der Weise (Gotthold Ephraim Lessing)
- Elsbeth – Das Turnier zu Kronstein (Franz Ignaz von Holbein)
- Maria Stuart – Maria Stuart (Friedrich Schiller)
