= Edmund Kretschmer =

German organist and composer

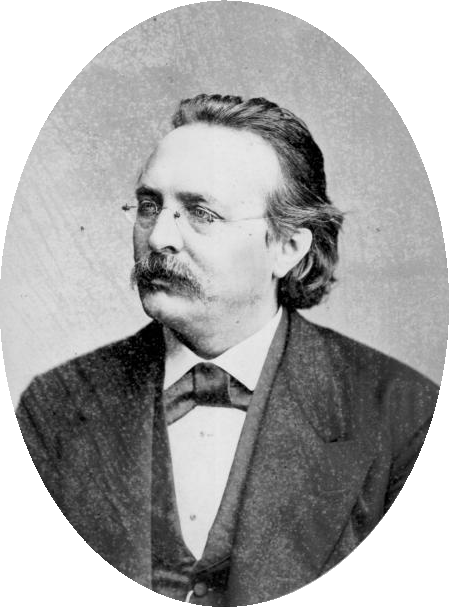
Edmund Kretschmer

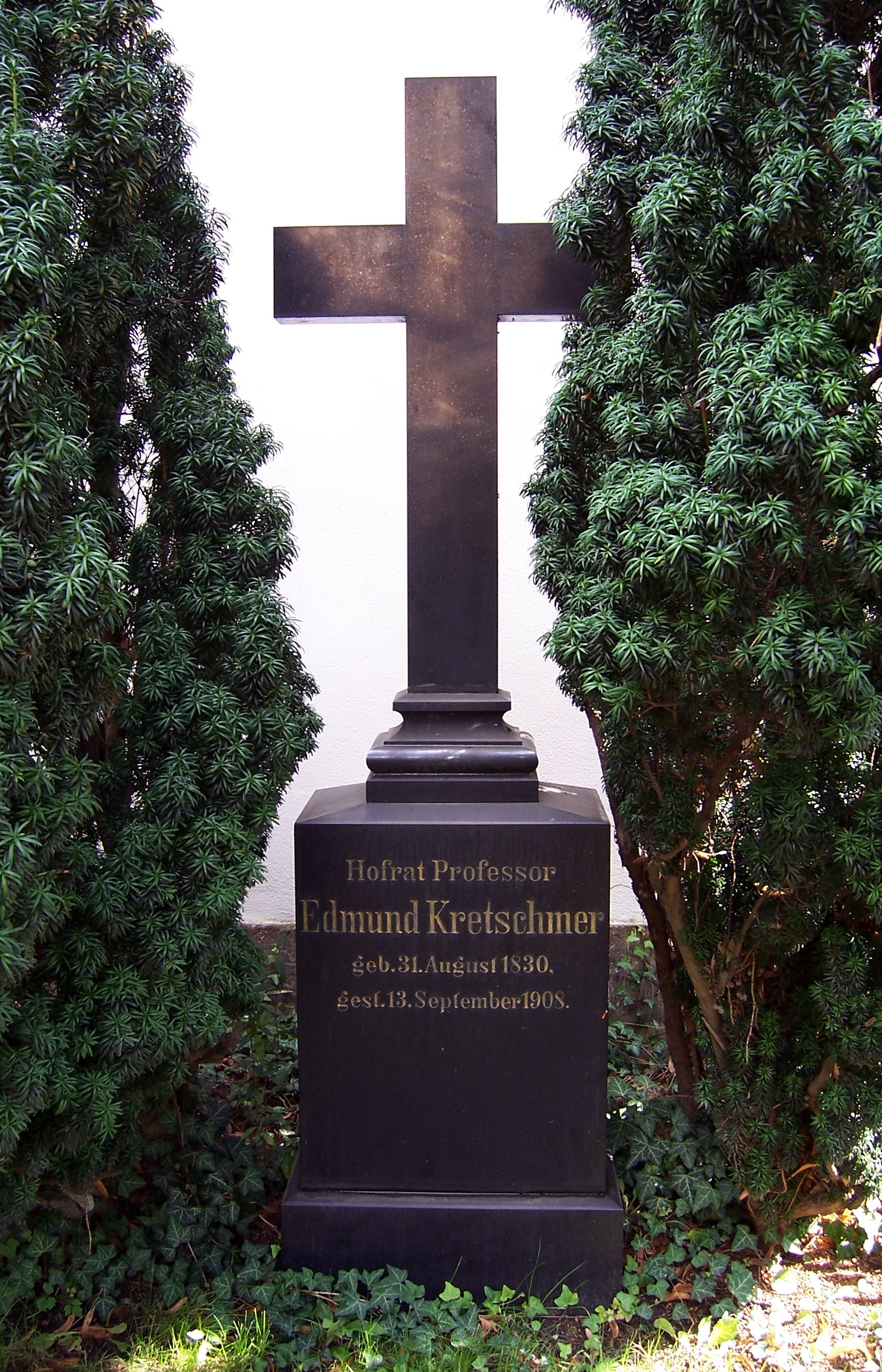
His grave in the Old Catholic Cemetery

Carl Franz Edmund Kretschmer (31 August 1830 – 13 September 1908) was a German organist and composer who worked for the Dresden Court and composed several operas and masses.

== Career ==
Born in Ostritz, Lausitz, the son of the rector of the municipal school, Kretschmer received first musical instruction from his father. From 1846, he studied in Dresden, composition with Ernst Julius Otto and organ with Johann Gottlieb Schneider. He first worked as a teacher, and in 1854 became the organist of the Katholische Hofkirche.

In 1863, he was appointed Hoforganist (Court Organist) and instructor of the Kapellknabeninstitut, and in 1880 also choral conductor of the Hofkirche. He composed around 80 stage works and several orchestral works, including four operas and four masses. The King awarded him the title of Hofkirchen-Componist.

His composition Die Geisterschlacht won a prize at the first Deutsches Sängerfest in 1865. He received a prize for a mass at an international competition in Brussels in 1868. He then composed his first opera, Die Folkunger, from a libretto by Salomon Hermann Mosenthal.

Kretschmer died in 1908 and was buried in the Old Catholic Cemetery in Dresden. He was an honorary citizen of his hometown, where a street is named after him.

== Works ==
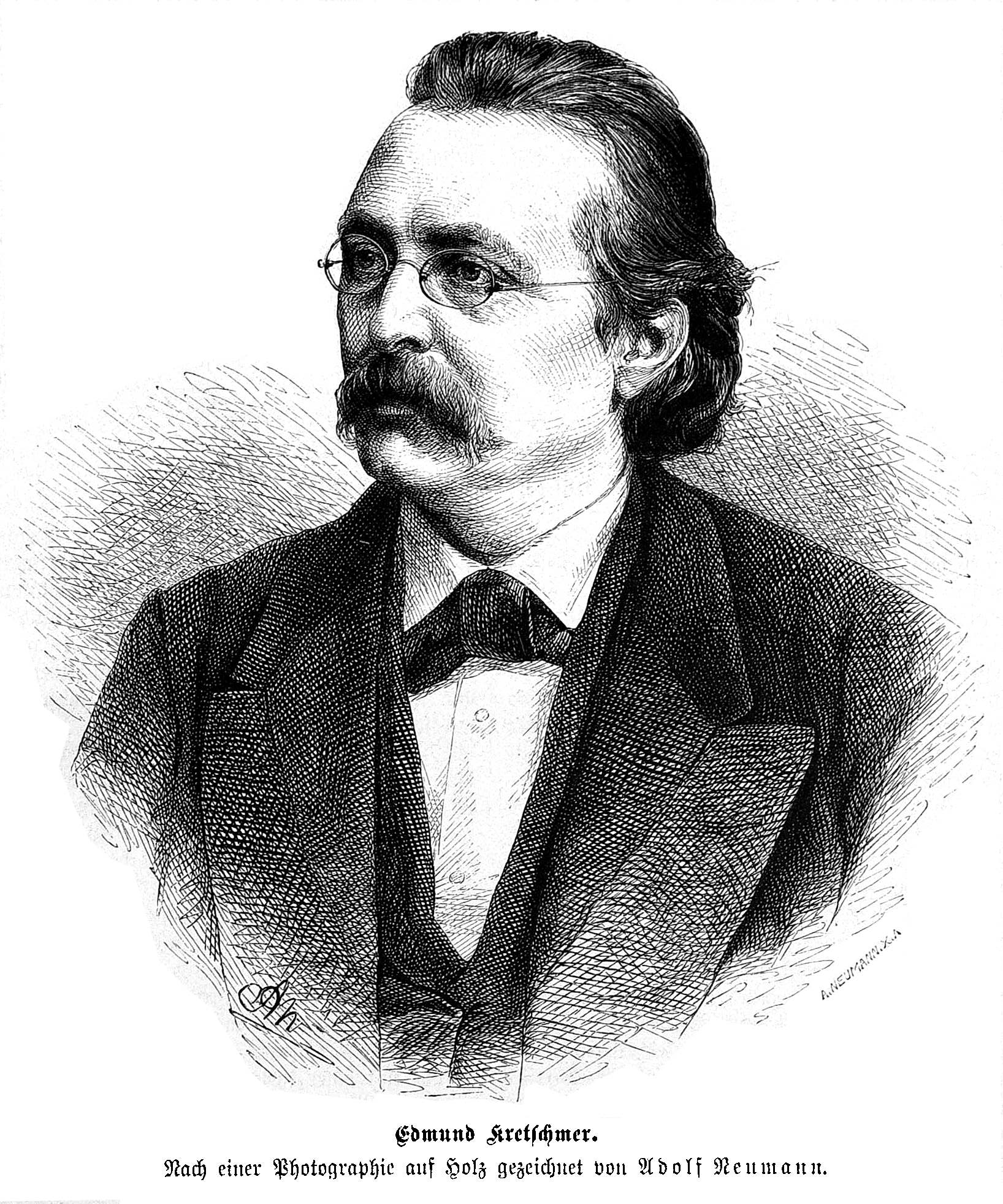
Die Gartenlaube (1880)

- Die Folkunger, opera in 5 acts, premiered on 21 March 1874 at the Dresden Hofoper
- Heinrich der Löwe, opera in 4 acts, premiered on 8 December 1877 in Leipzig
- Der Flüchtling, opera in 3 acts, begun in 1870, completed in 1880, premiered in 1881 in Ulm
- Schön Rotraut, opera in 4 acts, premiered in 1887 in Dresden
- Op. 1 Diebstahl: für eine Singstimme mit Begleitung des Pianoforte (1890)
- Op. 3 Frühlingslied: für eine Singstimme mit Begleitung des Pianoforte (1870)
- Op. 4 Die Geisterschlacht: in Musik gesetzt für Männergesang und Orchester (1865)
- Op. 8 Du bist wie eine stille Sternennacht: Lied für eine Singstimme mit Begleitung des Piano-Forte (1880)
- Op. 9 Novelletten : 4 Klavierstücke (1868)
- Op. 10 Der Himmel hat eine Thräne geweint: für eine Singstimme mit Begleitung des Pianoforte (publ. 1868)
- Op. 11 Gebt mir vom Becher nur den Schaum: für eine Singstimme mit Begleitung des Pianoforte (publ. 1870)
- Op. 12 Die Pilgerfahrt nach dem gelobten Lande, für Männerchor, Solostimmen und Orchester (Bote und Bock, 1869)
- Op. 14 Nachts am See: Lied für eine tiefe Stimme mit Begleitung des Pianoforte (1870)
- Op. 15 Vier Hymnen (Veni Creator Spiritus, Justorum Animae, Alma Redemptoris Mater, Pange Lingua): für vierstimmigen gemischten Chor
- Op. 17 Zwei Motetten: Laudate Dominum; Oster-Motette; für achtstimmigen gemischten Chor (1876)
- Op. 18 4 Hymnen für gemischten Chor (1870)
- Op. 20 Ave Maria: Lied für eine Singstimme mit Begleitung des Pianoforte oder des Harmonium oder der Orgel (1875)
- Op. 23 Missa in honorem Sancti Francisci Seraphici: ad quatour voces inaequales, organe comitante ad libitum
- Op. 25 Drei Gesänge für eine Singstimme mit Begleitung des Pianoforte (1877)
- Op. 28 Melodie: Concertstück für Orchester (publ. 1880)
- Op. 32 Dramatisches Tongedicht, g-moll, für Grosses Orchester (1882)
- Op. 34 Fünf Lieder für eine Singstimme mit Begleitung des Pianoforte (1885)
- Op. 40 Sextett in vier Sätzen für Flöte, 2 Violinen, Viola, Violoncell u. Contrabass (1888)
- Op. 43 Zwölf fugirte Präludien für die Orgel (publ. 1892)
- Op. 50 Missa a 8 voci (1896)
- Op. 62 Ländlicher Tanz, Liebe und trübe Gedanken
- Festgesang
- Sieg im Gesang
- Orpheus in der Kinderstube (publ. 1868)

== Literature ==
- Adolph Kohut: Das Dresdner Hoftheater in der Gegenwart. E. Pierson's Verlag. Dresden & Leipzig 1888, pp 486 ff, (Digitalisat).
- Otto Schmid: Edmund Kretschmer. Sein Leben, Schaffen und Wirken. Hönsch & Tiesler, Dresden 1890.
- Michael Heinemann: Was Messen auszeichnet: Edmund Kretschmers Beitrag zu einem Preisausschreiben für Kirchenmusik, in Die Dresdner Kirchenmusik im 19. und 20. Jahrhundert, ed. Matthias Herrmann, Laaber 1998, pp. 171–180 (Musik in Dresden 3), ISBN 3-89007-331-X
