= Henriette Sontag =

German operatic singer (1806–1854)

Henriette, Countess Rossi
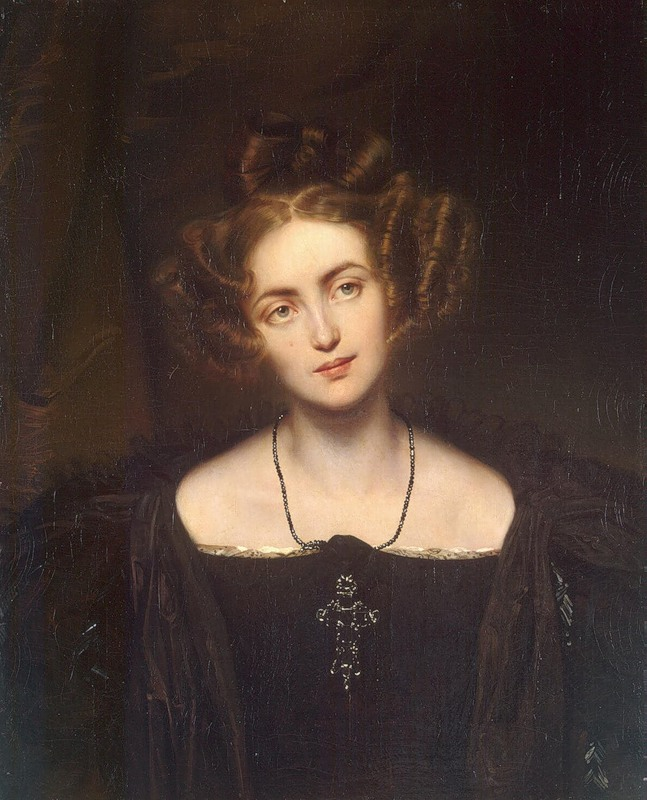
- Sontag in her Donna Anna costume, 1831 painting by Paul Delaroche
- Born: Gertrude Walpurgis Sontag; 3 January 1806; Koblenz
- Died: 17 June 1854 (aged 48); Mexico City, Mexico
- Occupation: Operatic dramatic soprano
- Years active: 1823–1854

Henriette, Countess Rossi (born Gertrude Walpurgis Sontag; 3 January 1806 – 17 June 1854), known by her maiden name Henriette Sontag, was a German operatic dramatic soprano.

== Life ==
Sontag was born at Koblenz, Germany, as Gertrude Walpurgis Sontag, to the actor Franz Sontag and his wife, the actress Franziska Sontag (née Martloff). Her brother was the actor Karl Sontag. She made her début at the age of 6. In 1823 she sang at Leipzig in Carl Maria von Weber's Der Freischütz and in December of that year created the title role in his Euryanthe. Her success was immediate. She was invited to be the soprano soloist in the first performances of Beethoven's Symphony No. 9 and Missa Solemnis on 7 May 1824; she was only 18 years old at the time. In 1825 she was engaged by the Königstädter Theater, Berlin.

In 1826, she was engaged at the Paris Comédie-Italienne, where she debuted in the role of Rosina in Gioachino Rossini's opera The Barber of Seville. She was also successful in performance in England and Germany in the following years. When she visited Weimar, Goethe wrote a poem dedicated to her, Neue Siren. Around 1829 she married Count Carlo Rossi in secret, after which she left the stage until her husband's financial situation deteriorated.

In 1849, she was encouraged by the impresario Benjamin Lumley to perform a season at Covent Garden Theatre. She proved to have fully retained her vocal powers. In 1852, she toured America, and in May 1854, at a literary evening in honor of Mexican president Antonio López de Santa Anna, she made public for the first time the lyrics that Francisco González Bocanegra had written to celebrate the nation (with an Italian musical arrangement). A day after singing Lucia di Lammermoor, she contracted cholera, which would claim her life at the age of 48.

Sontag died in Mexico City, Mexico, and is buried in Germany at St. Marienthal Abbey. Her sister Nina Sontag (1811–1879), originally also an opera-singer, had retired there as a nun in 1844.

== Singing ==
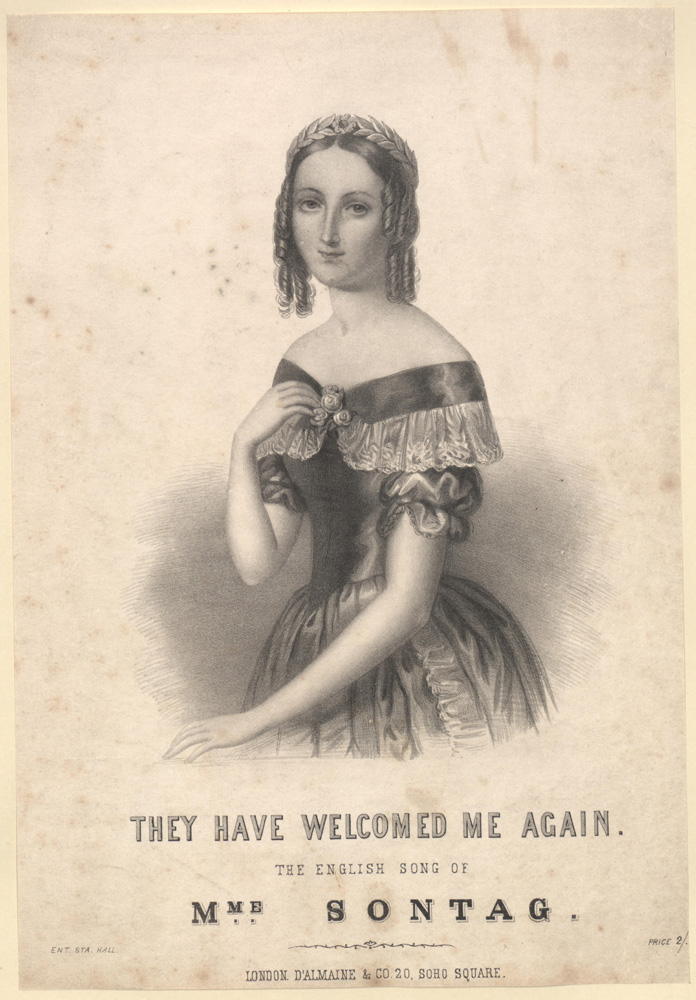
Sontag on cover of sheet music for song, "They have welcomed me again"

Sontag had a sweet-toned, lyrical voice and was an exponent of florid singing.

Hector Berlioz wrote of Sontag:

"She unites all the qualities—although not in an equal degree—all like to find in an artist: sweetness never surpassed, agility almost fabulous, expression, and the most perfect intonation. On she carols, higher and higher, like a lark at "heaven's gate", so soft, so clear, so wonderfully distinct that, like the silver bell from the altar, it is heard through the pealing organ. But her principal merit, in our eyes, is the absence of 'rant'—the substitute of genius—in any shape whatever. She always SINGS, and does not depend on mere strength of lungs—erroneously called 'power'. She never strains her delicate organ—that sweet instrument so susceptible of every shade of expression. How fortunate for our young singers that, like the nuns in Meyerbeer's Robert le Diable she left the tomb of the seven ancestors, bestowed by the King of Prussia upon the Countess de Rossi, to teach them the wide difference between singing and screaming, and to show how we all, during the last ten years, have been listening to, and adoring false prophets."
