= Carl Miedke =

German actor, director and playwright

Carl Gottfried Miedke, also Miedtke, (3 September 1773 – 4 January 1839), was a German actor, director and playwright.

== Life ==
Miedke was born in Potsdam on 3 September 1773. His father was the Royal Küchenschreiber Gottfried Miedke at the court of Frederick the Great, the mother was Albertina Charlotta Kaebelizzen or Kaebelitz. He was active on the stage from the age of 18 and was married in his first marriage to the actress and singer Charlotte Miedke, née Pfister (1781 in Mannheim - 22 October 1806 in Stuttgart). There were three children from this marriage:

- Karl August Krebs (16 January 1804 in Nuremberg - 16 May 1880 in Dresden), who, after his mother's early death from scarlet fever in 1806, was adopted in the child's place by the court singer Johann Baptist Krebs there, with his father's consent, after the couple moved to Stuttgart, and consequently took the name of his foster father Krebs; he was active as a pianist, composer, and latterly in Dresden as court conductor;
- Friedrich Georg Leonhard Miedke (between 31 December 1802 and 31 January 1803 in Nuremberg - 16 October 1842 in Regensburg), who was active as a singer (baritone or bass), actor and director in Stuttgart, Augsburg, Ulm among others, after retiring from the theatre as a painter, gallery owner and writer in Regensburg;
- Anna Fischer-Maraffa (1802-1866), who was also adopted after the death of her mother. Under the name of her adoptive father, the opera singer Joseph Fischer, and that of her husband Maraffa, she performed throughout Europe as an opera singer.

In his second marriage, he was married from 3 March 1810 to Wilhelmine Aschenbrenner (1791 - after 1834), who was active as an actress in Stuttgart, Leipzig, Darmstadt among others and who was portrayed in 1834 by the painter Otto Stotz (1805-1873).

Miedke died in 1839 as a retired court actor in Stuttgart at the age of 65.

== Professional career ==
Together with his first wife Charlotte, who among others also gave guest performances in Erlangen, he was engaged by the Augsburg Fuggersche Gesellschaft under Ferdinand Kindler in Nuremberg in 1798 and at the Nuremberg Theatre from 1798 to 1801. In 1805, he moved with his wife from Nuremberg to the Court Theatre in Stuttgart, where he appeared among others in Schiller's Don Carlos as Posa and on 16 March 1823 appeared as Samiel in der Freischütz. Guest appearances at the Würzburg theatre are documented for 1834.

Wilhelm Waiblinger, with whom he was a friend, took declamation lessons from him and praised Miedke's acting and his high level of knowledge. However, Miedke's acquaintance with the Stuttgart court singer Krebs caused Waiblinger to distance himself from Miedke (according to the diary entry of 18 September 1822); however, further contacts are documented until 1826.

== Dramas by Carl Miedke in Auswahl ==
- Manuel der falsche Freund : Ein Trauerspiel in fünf Aufzügen, Mannheim, Loeffler 1798.
- Adolph der Kühne Raugraf von Dassel, or Die Zerstörung von Northeim: Ein Gemälde der Vorzeit in fünf Aufzügen (Performed at the Bremen Theatre on 25 February 1813)
