= Aloyse Michalesi =

German operatic alto

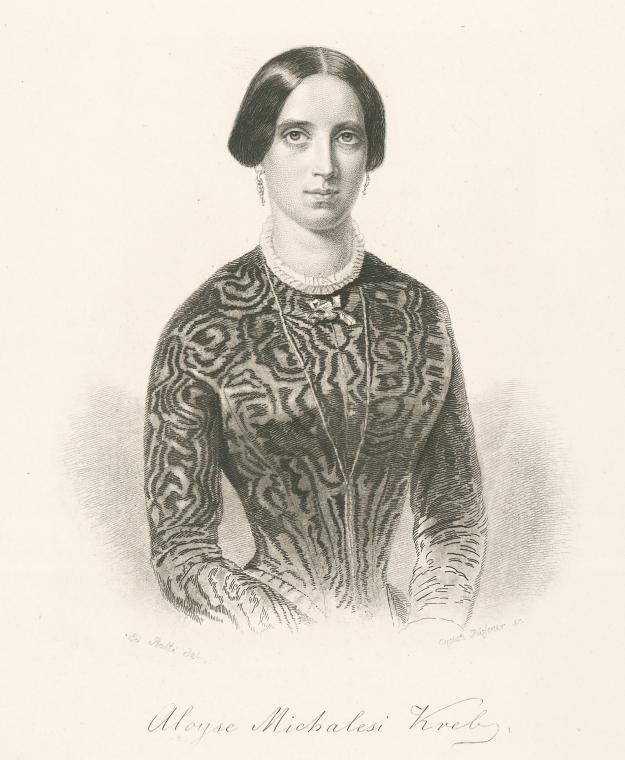
Aloyse Michalesi

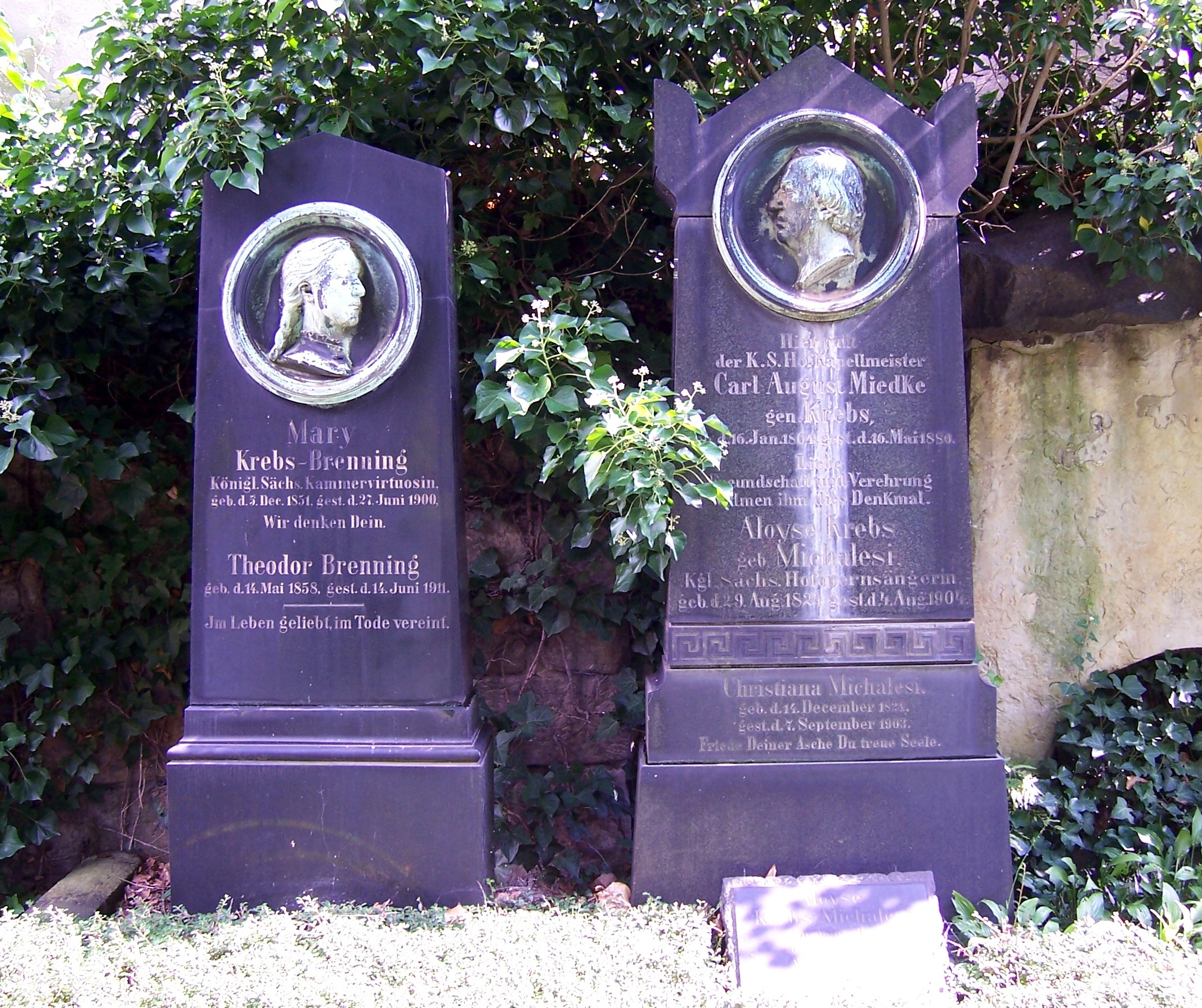
Family gravestone at Old Catholic Cemetery, Dresden

Aloyse Michalesi, married name Aloyse Krebs-Michalesi, also Aloysia Krebs-Michalesi (29 August 1824 – 5 August 1904) was a German operatic contralto.

== Life ==
Michalesi was born in Prague. Her parents were the opera bassist Wenzel Michalesi (Czech: Václav Michalička; 1794-1836) and his wife Josefine (d 1845), a singer. Michalesi's younger sister Josefine Michalesi (1 September 1826 in Brno - 13 October 1892), became a soprano.

Her parents were members of the Prague Opera, leaving it in 1829 and embarking on art tours, eventually coming to the Staatstheater Mainz. When her father died there in 1836, the family had to rely on Aloyse for extra income. She received lessons in stage singing from her mother, the theatre's first singer. When her mother went to London with Schumann's opera company in 1840, her daughter accompanied her. Later they were at the theatre in Brno, where Michalesi made her debut as Elvira in Mozart's Don Giovanni. There she worked for several years in youthful soprano as well as contralto roles before moving to the Hamburg State Opera in 1846 after the death of her mother. On the recommendation of Giacomo Meyerbeer, she accepted a position at the Dresden Court Theatre in 1849. Her first role there was that of Fides in Meyerbeer's opera Le prophète, which had its first performance on 30 January 1850.

In 1850, she married the composer and Hofkapellmeister Karl August Krebs (1804–1880) and called herself Krebs-Michalesi from then on. In December 1851, their daughter Mary Krebs-Brenning was born, who was later to become a successful pianist. Michalesi took leave from the Dresden Opera Association in 1870 and from then on sang only concerts and in church. As a singing teacher, she gained a good reputation beyond the borders of Germany. When Michalesi died in August 1904 at the age of 79, she had outlived her daughter by four years.

Michalesi is buried at the Old Catholic Cemetery in Dresden.

== Students ==
- Ernestine Schumann-Heink
