= Josef Tichatschek =

German opera singer

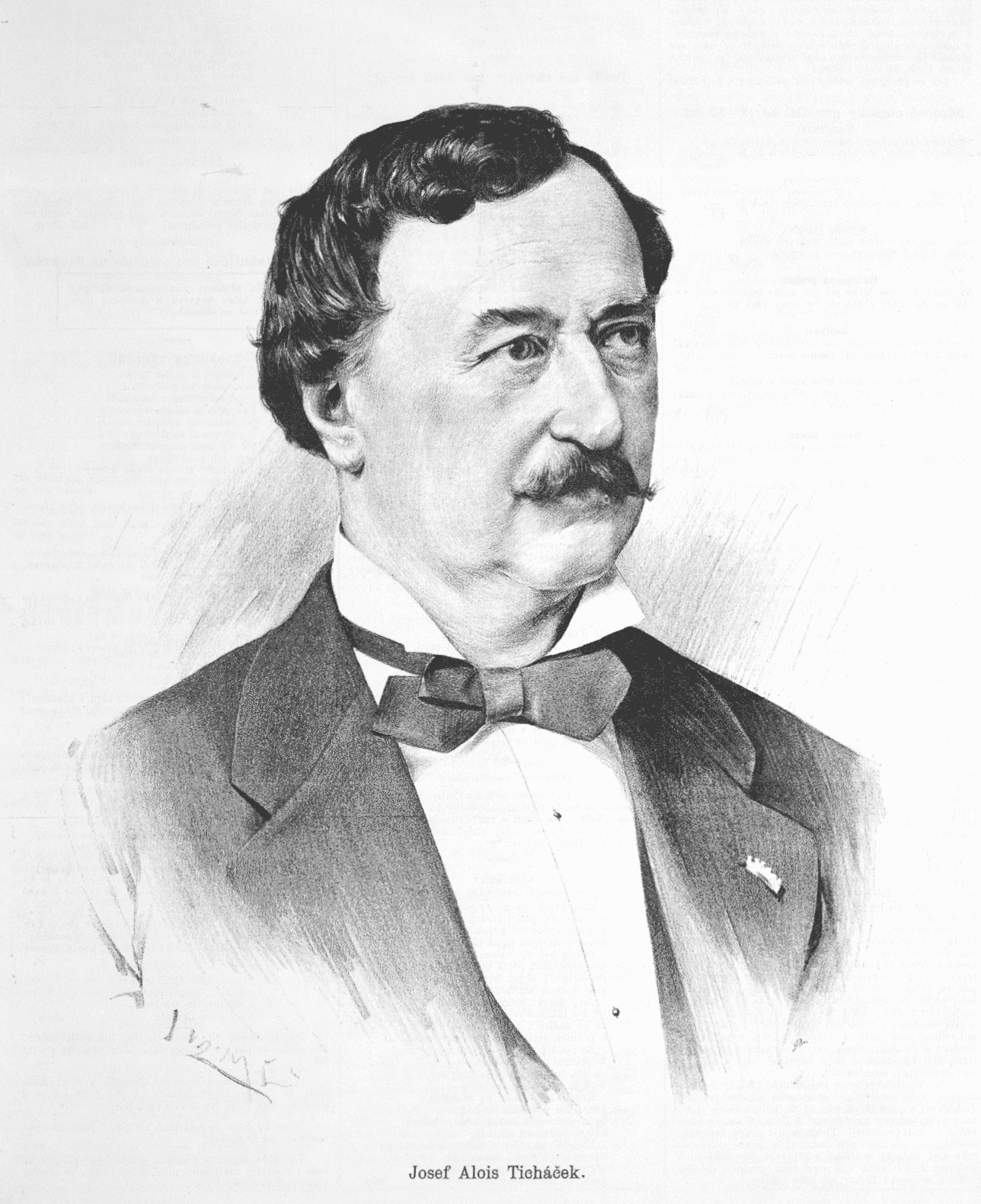
Josef Tichatschek

Josef Aloys Tichatschek (11 July 1807 – 18 January 1886), originally Ticháček, was a Bohemian opera singer highly regarded by Richard Wagner. He created the title roles in Wagner's operas Rienzi and Tannhäuser.

As the first of the great Wagnerian tenors, he effectively was the original Heldentenor, although it is unlikely that his voice was as powerful as that of 20th-century heldentenors such as Lauritz Melchior or Jon Vickers, given the smaller volume of sound produced by orchestras in his heyday.

== Outline ==
Born in Weckelsdorf (now part of Teplice nad Metují, Náchod District, Bohemia), Tichatschek originally studied medicine, but he abandoned this career path for professional singing. He received voice lessons in Vienna from the Italian tenor Giuseppe Ciccimarra (1790–1836) and joined the chorus of the Kärntnertortheater in 1830. He advanced to chorus inspector, and began to take small solo roles. Rising to the status of principal tenor, he worked first at Graz before returning to Vienna. In 1837, he became principal tenor at Dresden, a major music centre, where he remained until 1870. He sang in London, at the Theatre Royal, Drury Lane, in 1841, performing the roles of Adolar in Weber's Euryanthe and as Meyerbeer's Robert le diable. At Dresden, he was coached by his famous colleague Wilhelmine Schröder-Devrient, and there created the title roles in Rienzi in 1842 and in Tannhäuser in 1845.

Wagner referred to his voice as "ein Wunder von männlich schönem Stimmorgan" (a wonder of a beautiful male voice). Referring to a Dresden concert in 1843, Berlioz wrote: "Tichatschek, the tenor, has a pure and touching voice, which becomes very powerful when animated by the dramatic action. His style of singing is simple and in good taste; he is a consummate reader and musician, and undertook the tenor solo in the Sanctus [from Berlioz's Requiem] at first sight, without reserve, or affectation, or pretension." The singer's contemporary Sincerus (Siegmund Schmeider) emphasized that he was equally effective in works requiring romantic softness and sweetness of tone, having a very natural vocal production. His intonation and diction were above suspicion, but his coloratura was imperfect and his acting sometimes a little awkward.

He was greatly admired by the basso Karl Formes, who sang Robert le diable and Les Huguenots, and other roles, with him and Johanna Wagner at Dresden in 1848–49. Said Formes of Tichatschek: "his color of tone was almost unequaled, quite as perfect as Mario's... His 'Florestan' in Fidelio I have never heard equaled. In the Freischütz his 'Lives there no God' was almost appalling in its intensity." And in La Juive, "so terribly real in 'the curse', so intense the pain and love in 'Recha, my daughter, wilt thou live...' His repertoire is said to have included principal roles of Gluck, Mozart, Weber, Marschner, Méhul, Boieldieu, Auber, Nicolai, Meyerbeer, Spontini, Flotow and Spohr.

== Rienzi ==
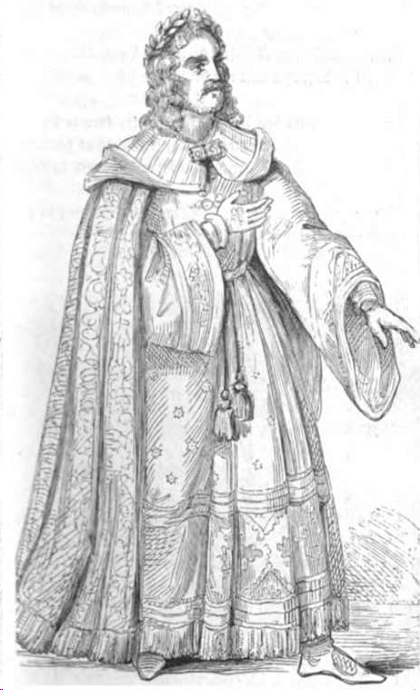
As Cola di Rienzo in Rienzi

The title role of Rienzi was written for Tichatschek, and was exactly suited to his robust and dramatic voice. He learned the part by singing it at sight from score during rehearsals, rather than by home study, with the result that he brought little reflection or dramatic intelligence to bear upon it. The first performance lasted about six hours and caused great excitement. Wagner instructed that cuts should be made, but Tichatschek refused, saying it was "too heavenly". After six performances it was decided to give the opera over two nights, but people objected to paying twice, and so the cuts were made. The work did not meet the same success in Hamburg and Berlin because Tichatschek did not appear there, and he was the only one whose voice and presence were then adequate for the role. Berlioz wrote: "Tichatschek is gracious, impassioned, brilliant, heroic, and entrancing in the role of Rienzi, in which his fine voice and large fiery eyes are of inestimable service... I remember a beautiful prayer sung in the last act."

== Tannhäuser ==
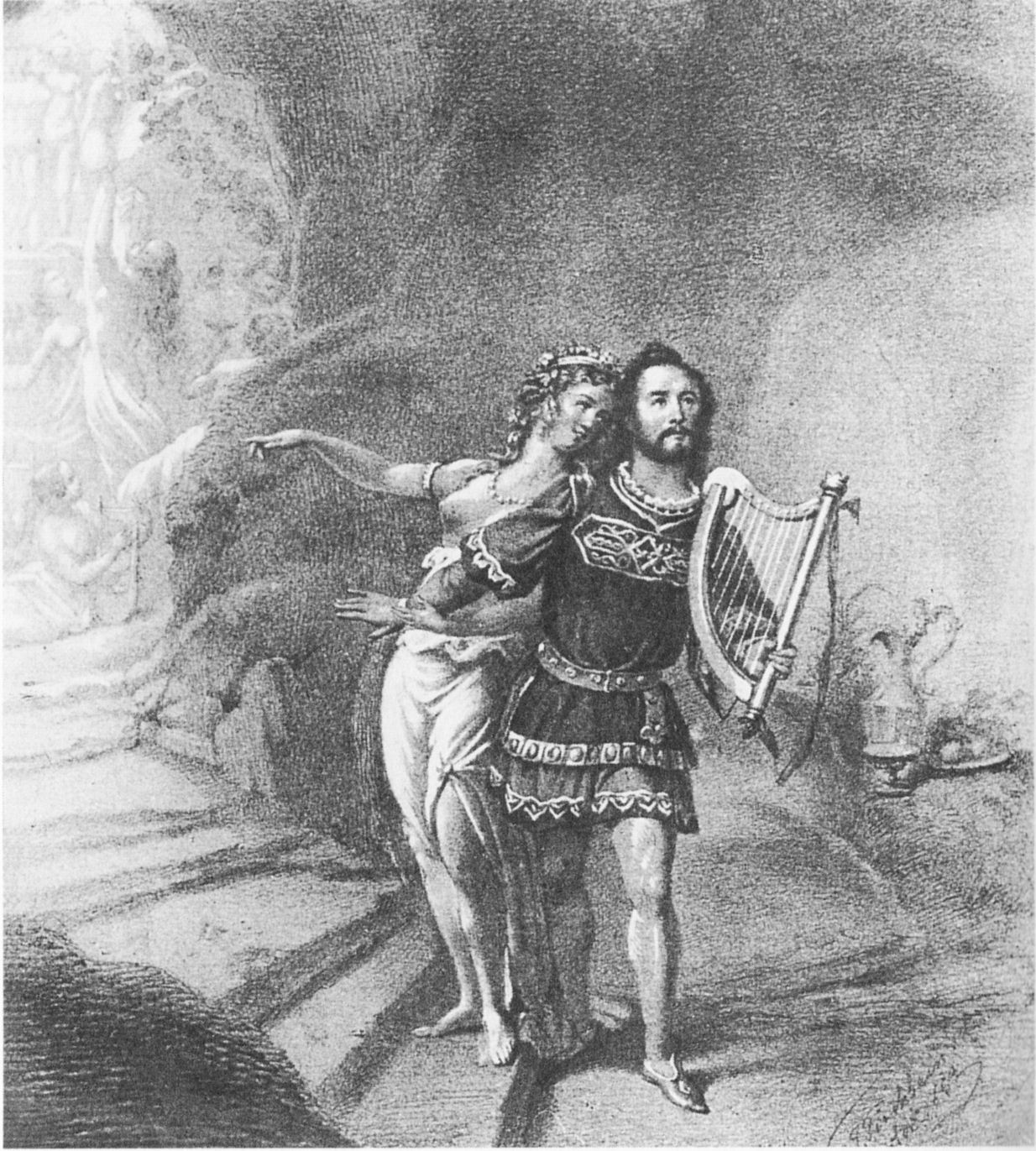
Tichatschek with Wilhelmine Schröder-Devrient in Tannhäuser

Tichatschek rehearsed this role with Wagner as it was being written, in company with his Elisabeth, the mezzo-soprano Johanna Jachmann-Wagner. It is said that when they had finished going through the act 3 recitative for the first time, he and Wagner embraced each other in tears. His voice, however, did not hold up well during the second and third acts of the first performance, and the repetition (for the next day) had to be postponed owing to his hoarseness, and when it did appear many cuts were made in the part. It is said that the virtual failure of Tannhäuser was owing to Tichatschek's inability to grasp the dramatic meaning of the work. This had been foreseen by Schröder-Devrient, and his lack of psychological subtlety, of dramatic insight and detailed study, soon became painfully apparent. Above all, Tichatschek's failure to bring off the dramatic meaning of the extended passage in the finale of act 2, "Erbarm' dich mein!", resulted in the need for this to be cut, much to Wagner's sorrow. During 1852–53, Wagner went over this ground in his essay "On the Performing of Tannhäuser", but the cuts had become so customary that he had to explain the matter afresh (and with no happier outcome) to Albert Niemann who was to sing the role at Paris in 1861. He and Johanna Jachmann-Wagner remained friends for many years: she was Valentine opposite his Raoul in Les Huguenots at Dresden in 1846. They appeared together in Tannhäuser at Dresden again in 1858.

== Lohengrin ==
Tichatschek was also a distinguished Lohengrin. The Dresden management presented Lohengrin in Wagner's absence during 1858–59, when Tichatschek made an urgent plea for them to send Wagner (then in exile) an honorarium of 50 Louis d'or—which they did. In 1867, when planning a production of Lohengrin for Ludwig II, Wagner recommended the almost 60-year-old Tichatschek for the role, saying that his Lohengrin had been the one really good thing the tenor had done, assuring the king that, while his singing and declamation in the role suggested a painting by Dürer, his appearance and gestures were like a Holbein. Wagner was delighted with his singing at the rehearsal, but Ludwig, thoroughly disillusioned by the singer's less-than-ideal appearance, forbade him to be employed for the performances, resulting in a rift between the King and the composer.

Tichatschek first told Wagner of the young Karlsruhe tenor who was to become his own successor, and more-than-successor, Ludwig Schnorr von Carolsfeld, in 1856.

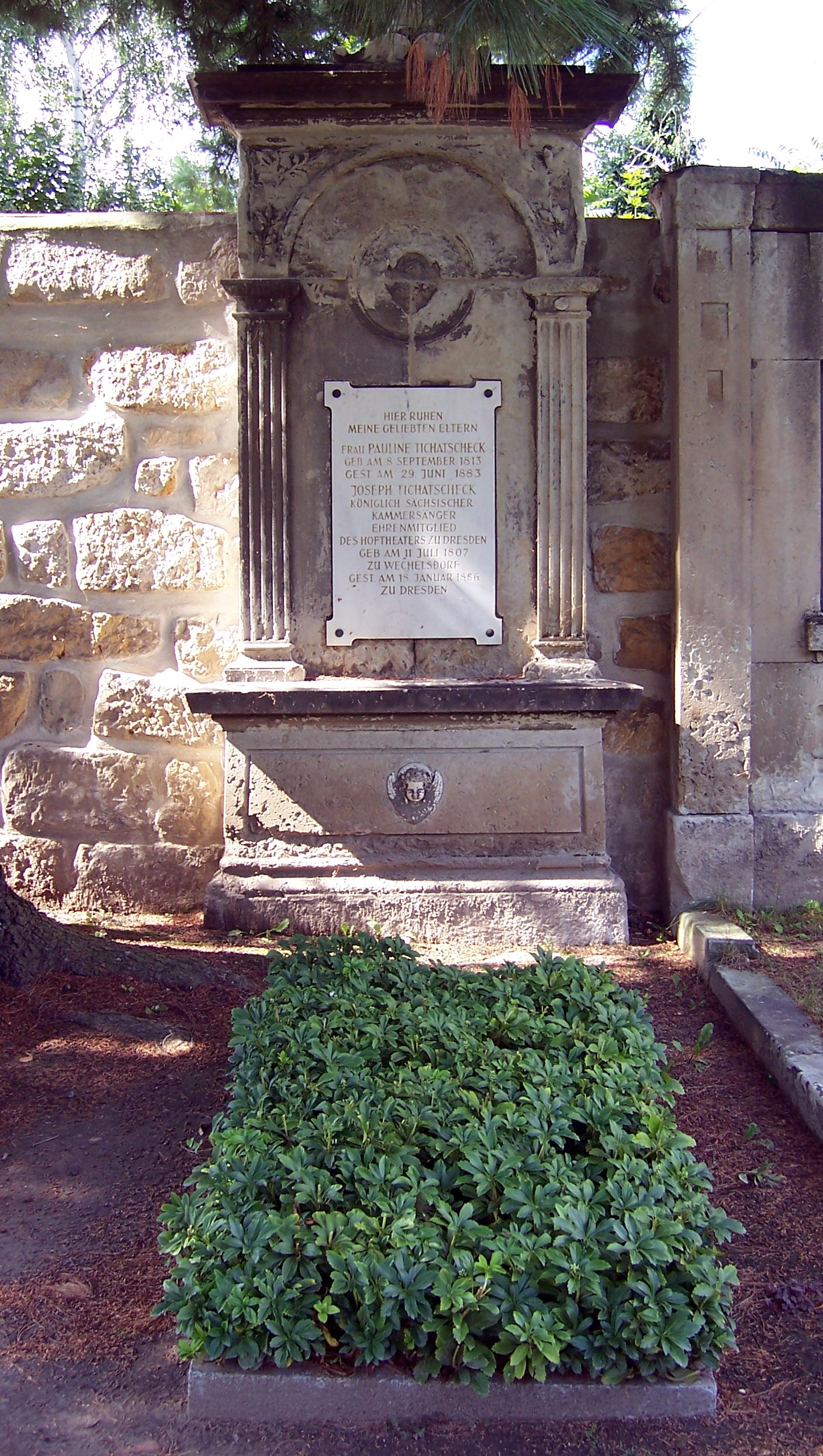
Tichatscheck's grave at the Old Catholic Cemetery, Dresden

== Tichatschek and Meyerbeer ==
Tichatschek sang in various German premieres of Meyerbeer's operas. The act 1 polonaise and the act 3 arioso for Danilowitz in L'étoile du nord were written for him, to sing at Dresden in 1855. He also sang in the Berlin premiere of Le prophète.

He died in Dresden, and is buried in the Old Catholic Cemetery on the Friedrichstraße.

== Sources ==
- Arsenty, Richard (2004). Giacomo Meyerbeer: The complete libretti in five volumes. Cambridge: Scholars Press.
- Berlioz, Hector (1932). Memoirs of Hector Berlioz from 1803 to 1865. annotated by Ernest Newman. New York: Alfred Knopf.
- Chamberlain, Houston Stewart (1923). Richard Wagner (7th ed.). Munich: F. Bruckmann.
- Rosenthal, Harold; Warrack, John (1974). The Concise Oxford Dictionary of Opera. London: Oxford University Press.
- Kobbé, Gustav (1935). The Complete Opera Book. London: Putnam.
- Newman, Ernest (1931). Fact and Fiction about Richard Wagner. London: Cassell.
- Newman, Ernest (1933–1946). The Life of Richard Wagner (4 volumes). New York: Alfred Knopf.
- Jachmann, Hans (1944). Wagner and his First Elizabeth. Translated by Maria Anna Trechman. London: Novello.
