= Kurt Striegler =

German composer and conductor

Kurt Emil Striegler (7 January 1882 – 4 August 1958) was a German composer and director.

== Life and career ==
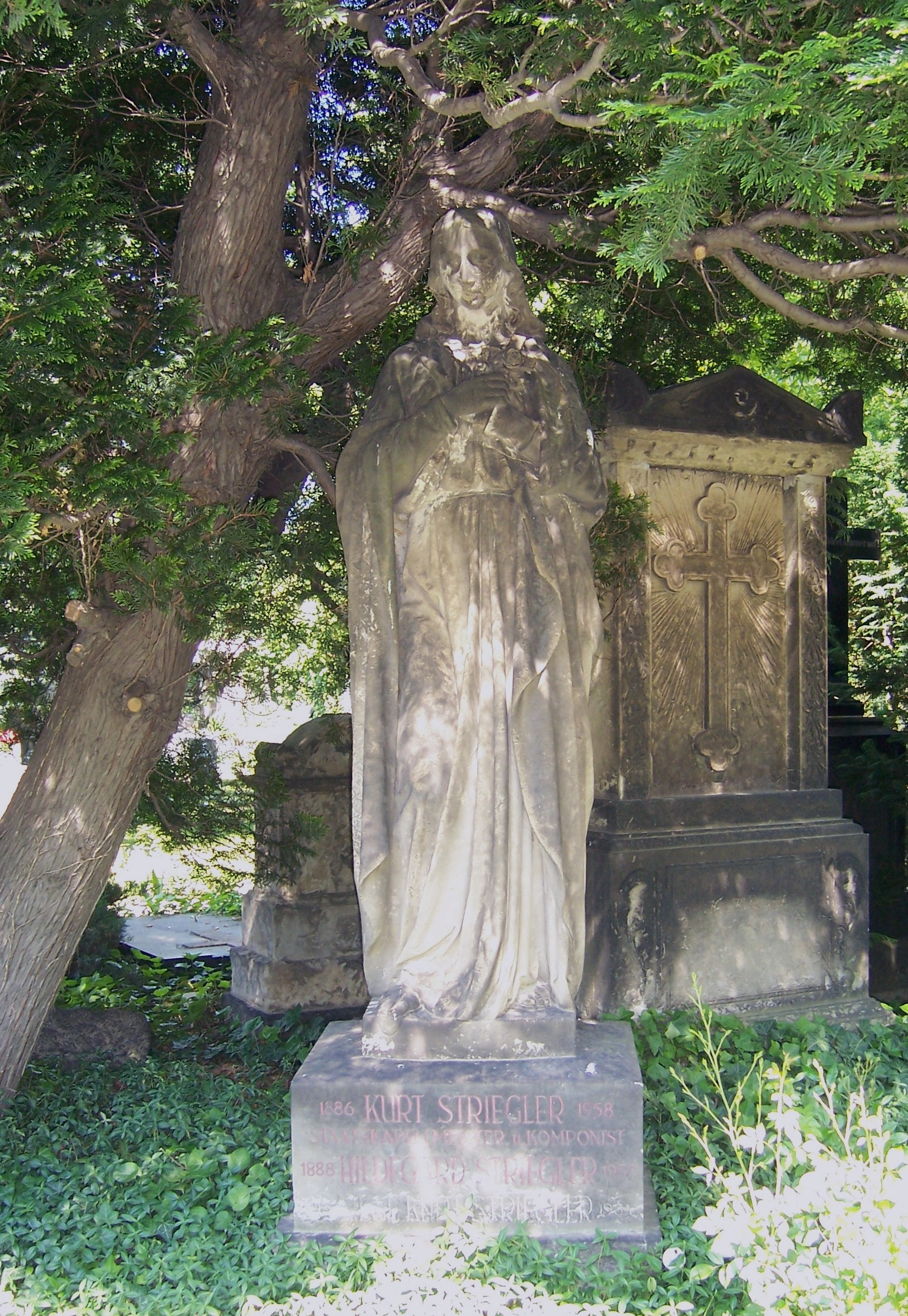
Grave of Kurt Striegler at the Old Catholic Cemetery, Dresden

Born in Dresden, the son of a chamber musician at the Saxon State Theatre, he attended the Royal Saxon Kapellknaben Institute in Dresden and was appointed Kapellmeisteraspirant at the Dresdner Hofkapelle by Ernst von Schuch in 1905. In 1912, he was appointed Kapellmeister. For more than 50 years, he was committed to Dresden's musical life as a teacher, conductor, musician and composer. From 1939 to 1945, he directed the Singakademie Dresden, the Dresden Men's Singing Society and was docent for composition, conductor training and instrumentation teaching at the orchestra school of the Staatskapelle Dresden. Strieglers' students include the composer, writer, librettist and director Robert Bosshart, the conductor Rolf Kleinert and the composer and conductor Herbert Trantow. Striegler was a member of the NSDAP and in 1933 succeeded Paul Büttner, director of the Hochschule für Musik Carl Maria von Weber Dresden, and Fritz Busch, general music director of the Semperoper, both of whom had been forced out of office by the National Socialist rulers.

In 1950, Striegler moved to Munich. In 1953, the painter and graphic artist Otto Dix created the lithograph "Kurt Striegler". Striegler died in 1958 in Wildthurn/Landau aged 72. He was laid to rest in the Old Catholic Cemetery in Dresden.

== Work (selection) ==
- 1911: Elfenried (ballade by Max Freygang)
- 1920: Auf Schwingen des Windes (a song sequence for one singing voice with piano)
- 1920: Bardengesang
- 1923: Turkish Izmır March
- 1924: Hand und Herz (opera after Ludwig Anzengruber, libretto by the composer)
- 1930: Frühlings-Hymne (for male choir and orchestra)
- 1932: Dagmar (Opera), libretto: Robert Bosshart
- 1950: Glück
- 1955: Der Fink (ballade for coloratura soprano and orchestra)
- 1956: Blumenritornelle (for one voice and chamber orchestra)

== Estate ==
Striegler's estate is kept in the music department (call number: Mus.10749-...) and in the manuscript collection (call number: Mscr.Dresd.App.1951–1952) Saxon State and University Library Dresden.

== Recordings (selection) ==
- Karl Böhm, Kurt Striegler/Hans Pfitzner, Richard Strauss: Edition Staatskapelle Dresden – Volume 13. Hans Pfitzner: Sinfonie C-Dur, Richard Strauss: Don Juan, Till Eulenspiegel's Merry Pranks, Salomes Tanz, Festliches Präludium Hans Ander-Donath, Silbermann-Orgel of the Dresdner Frauenkirche. Staatskapelle Dresden/Karl Böhm, Kurt Striegler [1939–1944]. CD PH07010
- Richard Wagner: Die Walküre. Edition Staatskapelle Dresden – Volume 23. (1. Aufzug), Szenen aus Tannhäuser, Der fliegende Holländer, Die Meistersinger von Nürnberg, Siegfried, die Götterdämmerung Margarete Teschemacher, Max Lorenz, Kurt Böhme, Josef Herrmann, Marianne Schech, Karl Elmendorf, Kurt Striegler [1944]. 2CD PH07048
- Sorbische Rhapsodie für großes Orchester (1954). 5. Satz – Allegro vivace Volkstanz, duration: 7:26, MDR Leipzig Radio Symphony Orchestra, Kurt Striegler, Lizenziert durch Deutsches Rundfunkarchiv on RBB Media GmbH, recording: 22 December 1954, Leipzig
