= Karl August Krebs =

German pianist, composer, conductor (1804–1880)

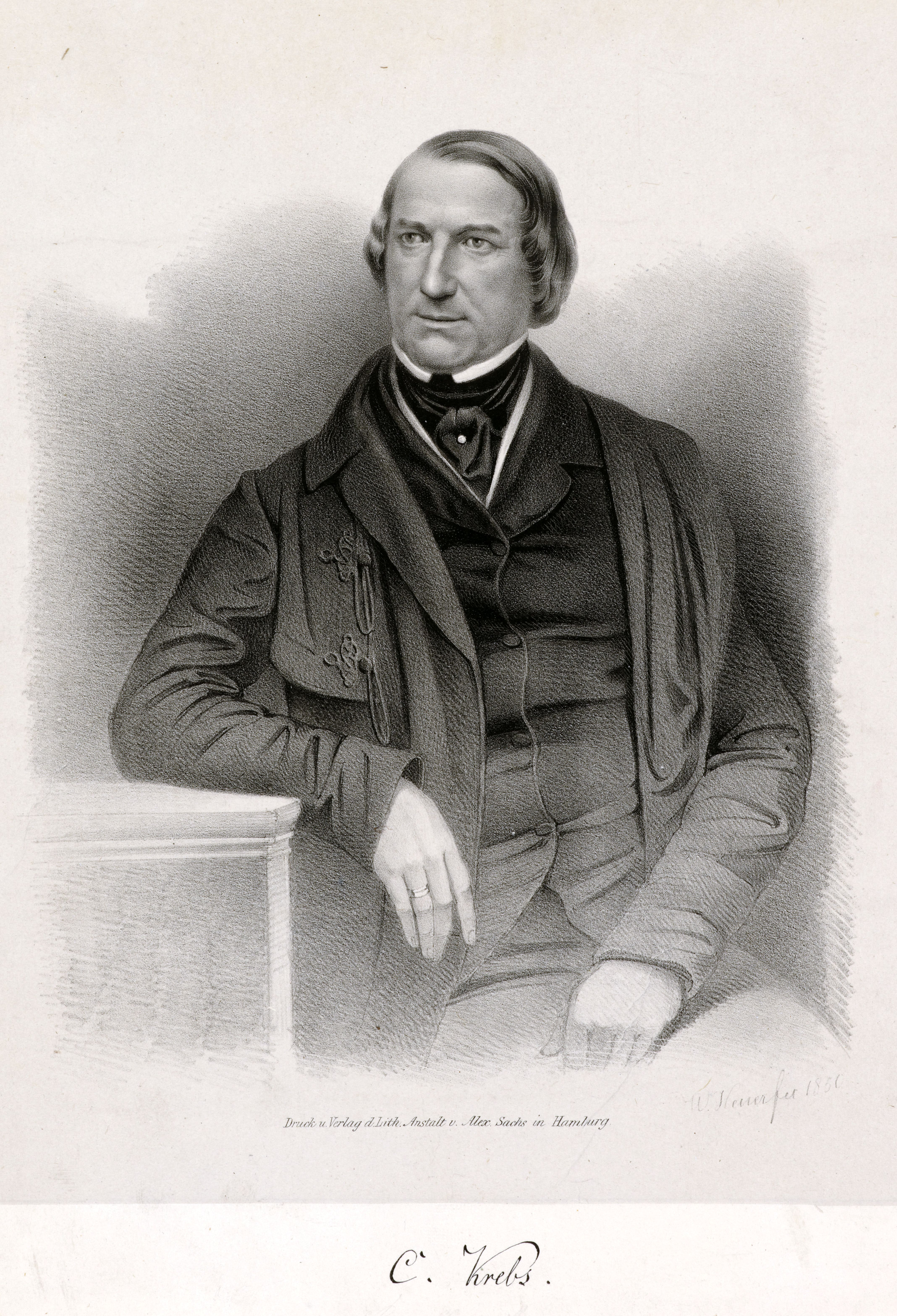
Lithograph by Wilhelm Heuer (1850)

Karl August Krebs (16 January 1804 as Karl August Miedke – 16 May 1880), also Carl Miedtke, was a German pianist, composer, conductor and Kapellmeister.

== Life ==
Krebs was born in Nuremberg in 1804. His parents were the actor Carl Miedke and the singer Charlotte Miedke, née Pfister, who both worked at the Staatstheater Nürnberg there. In 1805, the family moved to Stuttgart, where his mother died just one year later. Karl August was adopted, with his father's consent, by the court singer Johann Baptist Krebs and his wife Maria Anna, and subsequently took the name of his foster father. His foster father's activities at the Neues Lusthaus Stuttgart and his many contacts in artistic circles encouraged Karl August's interest in music. As early as his sixth year, he played piano concertos by Mozart, Dussek and Ries, taught by Johann Nepomuk Schelble. His talent for composition, nurtured by his adoptive father, also caused a great stir and he was counted among the child prodigies of his time.

In 1825, at the age of 21, he went to Vienna, studied with Ignaz von Seyfried composition and improved his piano playing skills. He distinguished himself as a piano virtuoso and on 1 April 1826 became third Kapellmeister at the Vienna Court Opera. In March 1827, he accepted a call as Kapellmeister at the Hamburg State Opera. In 1830, he performed his opera Sylva, oder die Macht des Gesanges (libretto: Georg von Hofmann), already composed in Vienna. In 1834, followed the opera Agnes, der Engel von Augsburg, which was also received with acclaim in Dresden in 1858 and 1863.

From 1850, Krebs was married in second marriage to the singer Aloyse Michalesi, who was also engaged in Dresden. Their daughter Mary Krebs-Brenning developed into an important pianist.

From 1850 under 1871, he served as court conductor at the Königliches Hoftheater Dresden; from 1871 until a few weeks before his death, he conducted the church music at the Catholic Court Church. In 1875, he celebrated his 25th anniversary of service, and on 1 April 1876, his 50th conducting anniversary. He died on 16 May 1880 at the age of 76 in the circle of his family; he was buried in the family grave at the Old Catholic Cemetery, Dresden.

== Awards ==
- In 1872 he was awarded the Knight's Cross of the Royal Saxon Albert Order.
- 1876 the Knight's Cross of the Order of Franz Joseph
- 1876 the Knight's Cross I. Class of the Württemberg Friedrich Order.
