= Friedrich Georg Leonhard Miedke =

German actor, singer, composer, theatre director, painter (1803–1842)

Friedrich Georg Leonhard Miedke, also Miedtke (January 1803 – 16 October 1842) was a German actor, singer, composer, theatre director, painter and writer.

== Life ==
Miedke was a son of the singer and actor couple Carl Miedke and Charlotte Miedke, and was born in Nuremberg between 1 and 31 January 1803.

He was artistically active in Stuttgart, St. Gallen, Augsburg, Ulm, Regensburg, Würzburg and other places. He was considered one of the finest dramatic baritones of his time, shining among others in the operas Don Juan, Figaro and Vampyr. He received his training in Stuttgart and then sang first in the choir until he was given smaller stage roles, which also distinguished him as an actor. In 1822 he received an engagement in Augsburg. In 1825, he took over the direction of the theatre of the city of St. Gallen, which, however, affected his private fortune so much that he secretly left Switzerland. The subsequent trial resulted in him having to spend 12 weeks in the Hohenasperg prison in Württemberg. After his release, he immediately turned to the city of Würzburg in 1829, where he was given the directorship of the opera on a fixed salary, which he held until the end of 1836. On 6 March 1834, a performance of the opera Faust by Louis Spohr took place in Würzburg "for the benefit" of Miedke.

From 1837, he retired from the stage and settled first in Bad Kissingen to devote himself entirely to painting; he also ran a gallery and was active as a writer. He died in Regensburg at the age of 39.

== Work ==
- Jean Dupuis und Simon Meisinger, carnival posse in 2 parts by Friedrich Miedtke, premiere 23 February 1841 in Regensburg.
