= Wilhelmine Aschenbrenner =

German stage actress

Wilhelmine Aschenbrenner (c. 1791 – after 1834), with married names Wilhelmine Aschenbrenner-Miedke, also Wilhelmine Aschenbrenner-Miedtke and Wilhelmine Vetter, was a German stage actress.

== Life ==
Born in Frankfurt, Aschenbrenner was at the theatre from childhood and already played children's roles in Stuttgart. She was married in her first marriage from 1810 to the actor, director and playwright Carl Miedke (1773–1839), from whom she separated in 1820.

From February 1814, she worked at the Staatstheater Stuttgart (until March 1820, roles: lovers), from there she made guest appearances among others in Darmstadt (1 May 1818), Leipzig (15 May until 3 June 1818) and again Darmstadt (12/16 June 1818) June 1818); from April 1820 to 1827 she was employed at the Theater Leipzig from where guest appearances among others in Hamburg and Bremen (1826) followed. After guest roles in July 1827, she was engaged at the Hoftheater Darmstadt from November 1827 (debuts in December 1827), where she worked until 1831 (role: first tragic mothers and character roles). In July 1828, Aschenbrenner-Miedke married the singer Franz Xaver Vetter, with whom she returned to Stuttgart in 1832.

In 1834, she was portrayed by the painter Otto Stotz (1805–1873).
