= Charlotte Miedke =

German singer and stage actress

Charlotte Miedke, née Pfister (1781 in Mannheim – 27 October or 22 October 1806), also Miedtke, was a German singer and stage actress.

== Life ==
At the age of 15, on 11 December 1796, she was already engaged as a soubrette in Mannheim. Further stations of her career were from 1798 to 1801: Theatre Nuremberg (subject: soubrette and naive roles), 1802: Aachen (summer 1802), 1802: Düsseldorf (Oct./Nov. 1802) and 1802 to 1805: Nuremberg (as first female singer). In 1805, she came to the court theatre in Stuttgart, where she worked as an actress.

She had been married to the actor Carl Miedke in his first marriage since 1801/02. The marriage produced three children, all of whom became well-known artists: the singer Anna Fischer-Maraffa (1802-1866), the singer, actor and director Friedrich Georg Leonhard Miedke (1803-1842) and the pianist, composer, conductor and later Dresden Court Kapellmeister Karl August Krebs (1804-1880).

After a scarlet fever infection, Miedke died, only 25 years old, on 22 October 1806 in Stuttgart-Bopser.
