= Anna Fischer-Maraffa =

German operatic soprano

Anna Fischer-Maraffa, born Miedke or Miedtke, (11 March 1806 – 19 October 1866) was a German operatic soprano.

== Life ==
Born in Ansbach, Fisher was the daughter of the actor and singer couple Carl and Charlotte Miedke, who were engaged in Ansbach. In 1806, soon after the family moved to Stuttgart, her mother died. Anna was adopted by the singer Joseph Fischer and later trained as a singer.

Various concert tours took the adoptive father and daughter through Germany and Italy, where both gained a distinguished reputation. From 1820 to 1830 Anna Fischer sang her first roles on the great stages of Italy - Florence, Rome, Milan, Palermo, and Naples. In Naples she married the singer Karl Maraffa. In 1829 Anna Fischer-Maraffa was engaged at the Paris Opera, In 1831/32 she sang at the Court Theatre in Darmstadt, then in Pisa until 1833. In 1836 she travelled in Spain, where she performed in Cadiz and Seville, among other places. In 1837/38 she gave various guest performances in Germany, including in Bremen, Hamburg, and Kassel.

She later returned to Mannheim, lived with her adoptive father, and cared for him until his death in 1862, aged 66.
