= Johann Baptist Krebs =

German writer and director

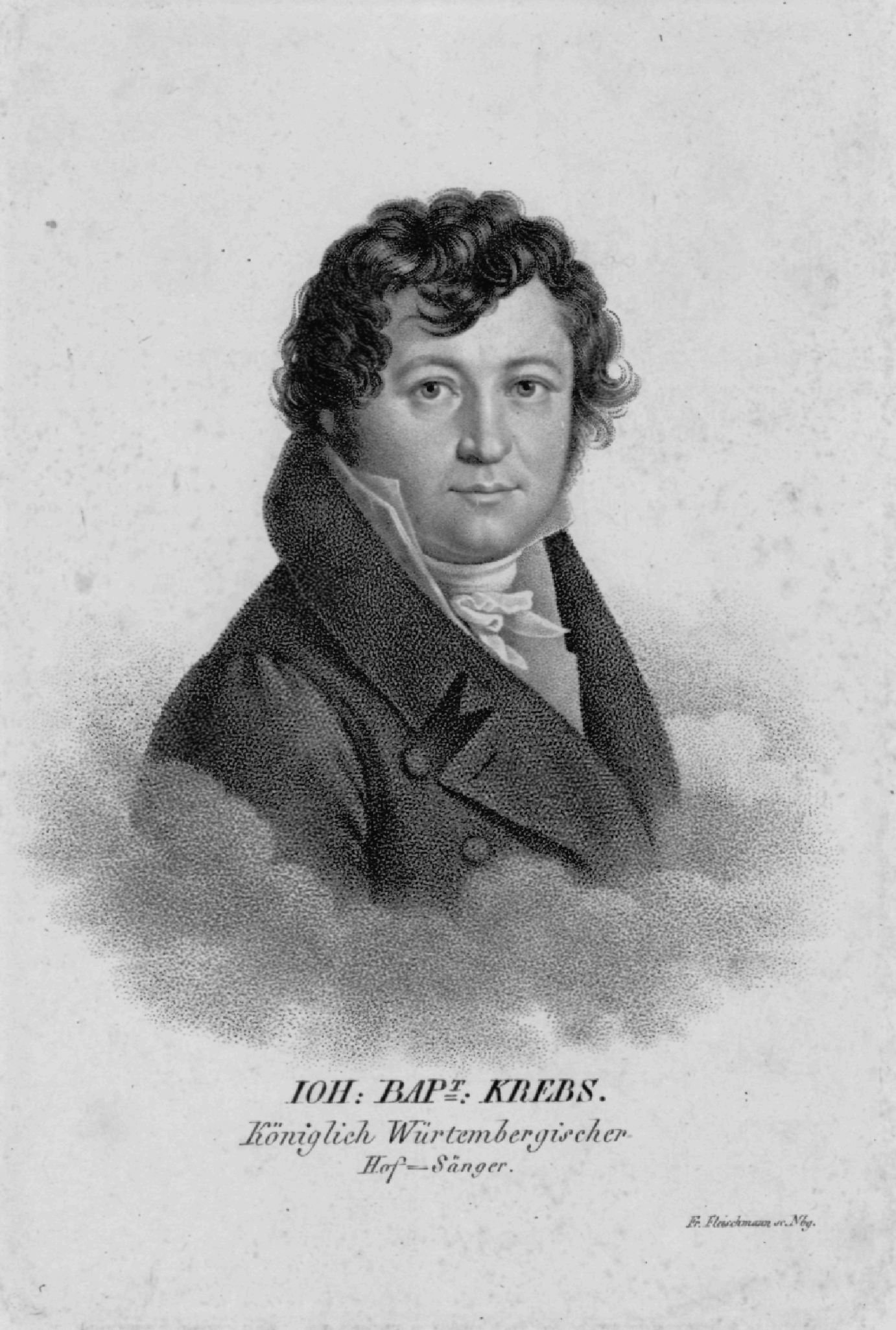
Johann Baptist Krebs

Johann Baptist Krebs (pseudonyms Johann Baptist Kerning and JM Gneiding), (born 12 April 1774 in Überauchen, died 2 October 1851 in Stuttgart) was a German opera singer, opera director, vocal pedagogue, freemason and esoteric writer.

== Biography ==
Krebs was a vocalist at the Württembergischer Hofoper in Stuttgart, where he was also the librettist of several operas. On his name day Carl Maria von Weber composed the (lost) burlesque "Antonius" in 1808 or 1809. Today, however, he is mainly known as the author of esoteric and Masonic scripts, which he published under the pseudonym Johann Baptist Kerning.

He was appointed for the spiritual status and sent to Constance to study Catholic theology. This he finished in Freiburg im Breisgau. From 1795 to 1823 he was a member of the Stuttgart Hofoper. In Stuttgart, he worked from 1823 to 1849 as a director and vocal pedagogue.

Krebs tried to understand the essence of Freemasonry in a mystical way. According to him, the ultimate goal of Freemasonry is the "realization and revival of a prophetic power in man". On 12 August 1820 he was raised by the Johannis Loge in Berlin for Aries in the degree of a knight apprentice. He received this degree in Berlin, because Freemasonry had been banned in his hometown of Stuttgart. After the ban was lifted, Kerning became the founder and long-time master of the chair of the Stuttgart Johannisloge "Wilhelm zur rising Sonne". Through his work at the opera, he had special influence in artistic circles, who found through him access to masonry.

He influenced Carl Graf zu Leiningen-Billigheim and Friedrich Eckstein, who led the Viennese Lodge of the Theosophical Society, but also practiced Masonic works "in the Art Kernings". The Christian mystic Alois Milanese and Nicholas Gabele used his writings to prepare their students. The doctor and writer Dr. Gustav Widenmann (1812-1876), who in 1851 published a significant and philosophically sound book on the idea of reincarnation, confessed to being a pupil of 'Kernings'.

Kerning's work in Masonic circles is awarded by many honorary certificates, especially of German lodges.

== Yoga ==
Krebs developed a consonant-vowel-based mystical practice, subsequently characterized by Theosophy-inspired esotericists as yogic, which was published by his pupil and successor Karl Kolb in "The Rebirth, the Inner True Life" (sometimes also under the title "The Letter Book"). These exercises, which were focused in working the vowels from the feet up, and consonants from the head down, focusing on the concentrated thinking and feeling of sounds, were taken up and further developed by Karl Weinfurter.

The writer Gustav Meyrink, whose "occult" novels are known, is said to have been inspired by Eckstein, who practiced the Kerning exercises for several years, but in retrospect expressed himself negatively about their value, even considered a spinal disease as a result of these exercises.

In 1896, Carl Kellner commented that "Krebs who published on this topic in the 1850s under the pen name Kerning [...] represent[s] the best that has ever been written in German about yoga practices, albeit in a form that might not be to everyone's taste."

Religious historian Karl Baier has written that Krebs "laid the foundation for the occultist reception of modern physical culture and of body-centred yoga practices."
