= Josef Kilian Schickh =

Austrian playwright

Josef Kilian Schickh (7 January 1799 – 22 May 1851) was an Austrian playwright who wrote mainly fairy tales, lokalposse and parodies for the Alt-Wiener Volkstheater, one of the three Wiener Vorstadttheater. He was the nephew of the journalist Johann Schickh and a contemporary of Johann Nestroy, Karl Meisl, Josef Alois Gleich and Franz Xaver Told.

== Life ==
Born in 1799 in Landstraße (Vienna), Schickh was the son of the Viennese merchant Josef Schickh. He attended the Academic Gymnasium and started his military service in 1815 as furir at the Fuhrwesenkorps (Train). In 1819 he quit the service and worked first in the Court War Accounting Department, later on at the Universalcameral-Zahlamt (until 1845). He then changed to the Universal-Staats- und Banco-Schuldencasse, where he remained until his death. He was married to the actress Antonie Schickh (1808–1870).

== Literary activity ==
Besides his civil service career, he wrote more than 70 plays for the suburban theaters of Vienna with which he achieved considerable success although they mostly only reached (quite wanted) mediocrity. His first work ("Pluto and Proserpina or: The Simandl from the Underworld") was performed in 1821 at the Theater in der Josefstadt. The same year he was also present for the first time at the Theater in der Leopoldstadt. From 1829 to 1831 he wrote several parodies for the Theater an der Wien - including the Ferdinand Raimund's parody Die goldpapierene Zauberkrone oder: Nichts ist unmöglich, whose play Die unheilbringende Zauberkrone in 1831 followed Die verhängnisvolle Limonade oder: Liebe und Kabale, after Schiller's Intrigue and Love.

In 1831 he was engaged by the Theater in der Josefstadt as a house poet but soon returned to the Theater in der Josefstadt. The competition with the then very popular playwright Franz Xaver Told let him move to the Theater an der Wien but his heyday was over. His work Die Hammerschmiedin aus der Steiermark oder: Folgen einer Landpartie (music by Franz von Suppé) became one of his last successes in 1842. With the critic Moritz Saphir he had a press war for years in the magazines Der Wanderer and Der Humorist, because the latter was one of his sharpest opponents. He shared this fate with Johann Nestroy, even if he was by far the better and more successful playwright.

Once, however, he succeeded in "defeating" his overpowering competitors: His parody of the fairy ballet Der Kobold (The Goblin), choreographed and danced by the famous Jules Perrot, was better judged by the contemporary press than Nestroy's play Der Kobold and Told's one of the same name. In September 1838 Schickh's work Noch ein Kobold, aber vermuthlich der letzte oder: Der junge Herr muss wandern was published and, in contrast to Told's and Nestroy's versions, found approving acceptance ("[...] so any unbiased person will have added the words in silence: And the best so far!".)

== Work ==
- Pluto und Proserpina oder: Der Simandl aus der Unterwelt. 1821.
- Staberl als Todter. 1828
- Die elegante Bräumeisterin oder: Neueste Art, alte Schulden zu bezahlen. 1830.
- Die verhängnisvolle Limonade oder: Liebe und Kabale. 1831, music by Adolf Müller senior.
- Der Kampf des Glückes mit dem Verdienste oder: Die Erfindung des Zufalles. 1833.
- Adelaide oder: Zehn Jahre aus dem Leben einer Sängerin. 1834.
- Asmodi oder: Das böse Weib und der Satan. 1834.
- Die schöne Holländerin. 1835, music by Adolf Müller senior.
- Hans Jörgel in Wien oder: Die Überraschung im Flora-Tempel. 1835, music by Adolf Müller senior.
- Das Zauber-Diadem oder: Abenteuer eines Stubenmädels. 1836, music by Michael Hebenstreit.
- Noch ein Kobold, aber vermuthlich der letzte oder: Der junge Herr muss wandern. 1838, music by Heinrich Proch.
- Die Lokalsängerin und ihr Vater oder: Das Theater im Theater. 1839.
- Die Hammerschmiedin aus der Steiermark oder: Folgen einer Landpartie. 1842, music by Franz von Suppé.
- Frau v(on) Trumau und Herr v(on) Tinderl oder die modernen Wirthschaften. o. J., Faschingsspiel with singing; between 1830 and 1848 Theaterzensur officially prohibited.
