= Zauberspiel =

Zauberspiel (magic play, plural: Zauberspiele) or Zauberstück (magic piece, plural: Zauberstücke) is a German-language work for the stage that has magic characters or magic action, or both.

These plays were popular in the 18th and 19th centuries in the south of the German-speaking area, particularly in Vienna. They drew on earlier traditions including the chivalric romances of medieval and early modern times, the medieval mystery plays, and plays such as Shakespeare's A Midsummer Night's Dream and The Tempest. They were notable for their stage effects.

In Vienna, they were among the plays performed in the Theater in der Leopoldstadt, the Theater auf der Wieden, the Theater an der Wien and the Theater in der Josefstadt.

An early such work was Megära, die förchterliche Hexe ("Megära, the witch of the forest") by Philipp Hafner, of 1763. In the 19th century Zauberspiele were written by dramatists including Ferdinand Raimund, Adolf Bäuerle, Josef Alois Gleich, Karl Meisl, Johann Nestroy and Franz Xaver Told, whose play Der Zauberschleier ("The Magic Veil"), of 1842, was particularly successful.

== See also ==
- Féerie ("fairy play"), a French theatrical genre
