= Joseph Drechsler =

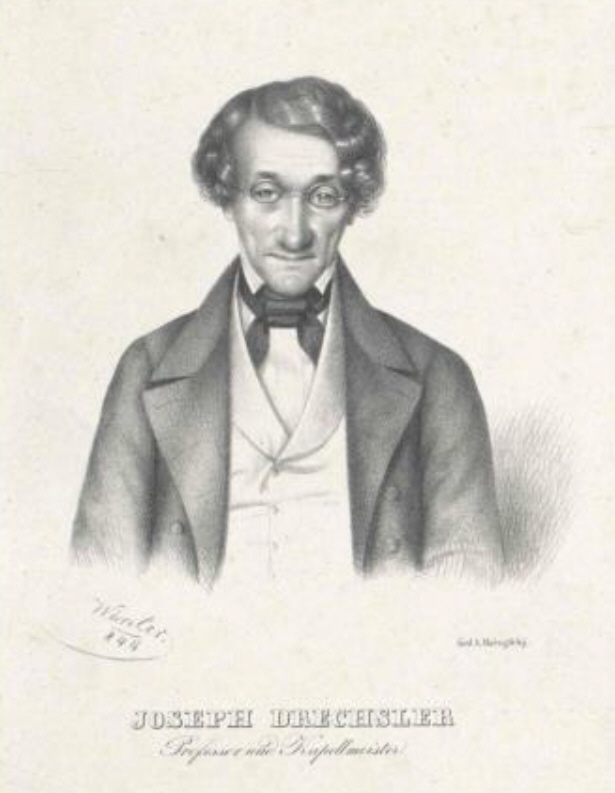
Drechsler (1844)

Joseph Drechsler (26 May 1782 – 27 February 1852) was an Austrian organist, teacher, composer and conductor. In Vienna he was organist and choirmaster at several churches, and theatre conductor and composer of incidental music.

== Life ==
Drechsler was born in Wällisch Birken (Vlachovo Březí, now in the Czech Republic), son of a teacher. He was a choirboy in Passau and in Vornbach Abbey, where he studied basso continuo with the organist Dionys Grotz. He studied law and theology in Prague. He moved to Vienna in 1807, being invited by Karl Friedrich Hensler to direct the orchestra of the Theater in der Leopoldstadt; he turned down this offer and remained in Vienna as a music teacher. In 1810, he was répétiteur and from 1812 assistant director at the Royal Court Theatre.

For a while he was theatre conductor at Pressburg (Bratislava) and Baden. In Vienna he was from 1814 organist at the Servite Church, and from 1816 choirmaster at St Anne's Church. From 1823 until 1845 he was choirmaster at the University Church and the Court Church.

At the same time, from 1821 he was theatre conductor at the Theater in der Josefstadt, and in 1824 he succeeded Franz Volkert as theatre conductor at the Theater in der Leopoldstadt, remaining until 1830. He composed incidental music for these theatres, notably for Ferdinand Raimund's Das Mädchen aus der Feenwelt oder Der Bauer als Millionär. From 1844 to 1852 he was director of music at St Stephen's Cathedral, succeeding Johann Baptist Gänsbacher.

His students included Joseph Wolfram and Johann Strauss II. Drechsler died in 1852, and was buried at St. Marx Cemetery in Vienna.
