= Wilhelm Turteltaub =

Austrian physician and writer

Wilhelm Turteltaub (25 March 1816 – after 1859) was an Austrian physician and writer.

== Life and achievements ==
Born in Rzeszów, Turteltaub came from a wealthy Jewish family from Galicia. His father was a doctor in Rzeszów. At the age of nine he went to Latin school and in his free time was engaged in foreign languages and music. During a visit in Lviv he got to know the theatre and at home he was given access to the library of the district commissioner Franz Stadion, Count von Warthausen, who later became governor of Galicia. At the age of 12, Turteltaub wrote his first plays. In 1830 he began to study philosophy, and at the end of 1832 he went to Vienna at the age of 17 to study medicine. His humorous-satirical works soon appeared in Wanderer, in Sammler and in the Wiener Theaterzeitung by Adolf Bäuerle. In 1835 his first book Wiener Fresco-Skizzen was published. In this time he made the acquaintance of Moritz Gottlieb Saphir, for whose magazine Der Humorist he became a permanent employee. Saphir also gave him access to the Viennese literary meetings. Through his mentor, Turteltaub wrote the book Saphiriana. Anecdotes, jokes and character traits from the life of M. G. Saphir, which was published in 1874 by Karafiat in Brno – so possibly only after his death.

In 1836, at the age of 20, he wrote his first stage play The Nightwalker by Day, which was well received by the audience at the Leopoldstädter Theater. His first posse mit Gesang was entitled Nur eine lösen den Zauberspruch oder Wer ist glücklich?, with music by Michael Hebenstreit. The piece had great success at home and abroad and was published by Johann Baptist Wallishauser in Vienna. In Turteltaub's collected edition Wiener Volksbühne; Taschenbuch localer Spiele (1838), also printed by Wallishauser, it was printed together with Johann Nestroy's Eulenspiegel oder Schabernack über Schabernack (1835) and others. His next farce With or without magic, however, was a flop at the Theater in der Josefstadt. In 1840 Turteltaub received his doctorate in medicine, married in the same year in Lemberg (today Lviv) the daughter of the state advocate Claar, and returned in 1841 as city physician (Stadtphysicus) to Rzeszów. Beside his many years of activity as a physician, he continued to write plays now and then, among them The Adventurer, The Youth Friend and The Daguerreotype all performed in Vienna. After the Revolutionary Year 1848 no more works by him have survived.

In the second half of the 19th century the influences of the Haskala (השכלה, Jewish Enlightenment between 1770 and 1880) also became increasingly noticeable in the town of Rzeszów. One of the most famous advocates of this movement in Galicia was Dr. Wilhelm Turteltaub.

In 1843 he was awarded the Golden Civil Medal of Merit with Ribbon for his successful work as city physician. His exact time of death cannot be determined exactly, but must have been after 1859, because for this year the publication of the Viennese theatre magazine Wiener Volksbühne by Wilhelm Turteltaub is documented.
