= Škroup =

Škroup is a surname. Notable people with the surname include:

- František Škroup (1801–1862), Czech composer and conductor
- Jan Nepomuk Škroup (1811–1892), Czech composer
