= Klučov =

Klučov may refer to places in the Czech Republic:

- Klučov (Kolín District), a municipality and village in the Central Bohemian Region
- Klučov (Třebíč District), a municipality and village in the Vysočina Region
