= Turteltaub =

Turteltaub is a surname derived from the German word for "turtle dove". People with the name include:

- Alan Turtletaub, founder of The Money Store (company)
- Jon Turteltaub, (born 1963), American film director and producer
- Marc Turtletaub (born 1946), American film producer
- Saul Turteltaub (1932–2020), American comedy writer and producer
- Wilhelm Turteltaub (born 1816), Austrian physician and poet

== See also ==
- Harry Turtledove (born 1949), American historian and novelist who writes under the pen name H.N. Turteltaub
