= Johann Hüttner =

Johann Hüttner (born 6 April 1939) is an Austrian theatre studies scholar, Germanist and one of the complete editors and volume editors of the historical-critical Johann Nestroy edition.

== Life ==
Born in Vienna, after studying theatre and German literature, Hüttner was a professor at the University of Vienna since 1991, at the Institute for Theatre Studies, of which he was chairman between 2000 and 2004. After his retirement in autumn 2004, he taught at the University of Music and Performing Arts Vienna at the Max-Reinhardt-Seminar until 2006.

Hüttner has published mainly on the topics of social history of theatre, Volkstheater, the connection between film and theatre. His special research interests are Austrian theatre history of the 19th century. In addition, he is one of the complete editors of the historical-critical Nestroy edition and editors of the new historical-critical Raimund edition.

Hüttner is president of the Grillparzer-Gesellschaft.

== Honours and awards ==
- 2002: Austrian Decoration for Science and Art first classe.
