= Franz Volkert =

Austrian organist and composer

Franz Volkert (2 February 1767 – 22 March 1845) was an Austrian organist and composer. He composed church music, and a great amount of music for dramatic works at the Theater in der Leopoldstadt in Vienna.

== Life ==
Volkert was born in Friedland (now Frýdlant in the Czech Republic), and received music lessons at home and later in Prague, where for a few years he was in the opera chorus. In 1790 he became assistant to Ignaz Haas, organist at the cathedral in Königgrätz (now Hradec Králové), succeeding him on Haas's death in 1800. At Königgrätz he composed church music, and also composed music for travelling theatre companies.

=== In Vienna ===
In 1810 Volkert was organist in Vienna at the Schottenstift. In 1821 he was assistant to Wenzel Müller, Kapellmeister at the Theater in der Leopoldstadt. He composed music for more than 100 dramatic works performed at this theatre: comic operas, Possen mit Gesang and pantomimes, by dramatists Karl Meisl, Josef Alois Gleich and others. Little of this music has survived.

He wrote one dramatic work, for which he also wrote the music, a Zauberoper entitled Die Abenteuer auf der Schlangenburg, staged in 1814 at the Theater in der Leopoldstadt, which was well received; a revival of the opera at the Theater in der Josefstadt in 1818 was a failure.
