= Carl Julius Curtius =

German writer and journalist

Carl Julius Curtius (23 June 1802 –10 March 1849) was a German writer and journalist.

Curtius was born in Pritzerbe in Brandenburg. After dropping out of university, where he was studying theology, he became a journalist.

By August 1825, he was an editor at the Spenersche Zeitung and later joined the Berliner Zeitung. In 1827, he edited the Estafette, along with Karl Simrock, in opposition to Moritz Gottlieb Saphir's Courier.

He also composed songs.

He was the author of the five-volume work Geschichte der Neu-Griechen von der Eroberung Konstantinopels bis auf die neuesten Zeiten (1827–1830).
