= International Theatre Vienna =

The International Theater (IT) was an English language theatre in Vienna, located in a former market at Porzellangasse 8, intended as an educational resource for teachers of English and literature in Austria, promoting cultural understanding between the United States and Austria, and providing a creative outlet for local artists. The theatre closed permanently on June 30, 2012.

== The theatre ==
The theatre boasted a proscenium-style raised stage with an auditorium at ground level. The main theatre had a capacity of 68 seats, and the theatre had its own workshops to build sets and scenery items as well as furniture, props and costume storage facilities. The theatre was mainly used to stage plays, though musicals had been produced as well.

== History ==
The International Theatre was one of the two professional English-language theatres in Vienna (the other being Vienna's English Theatre). It was founded in 1974 by American opera-singers William and Marilyn Wallace and started as a touring company. The first performance (Blithe Spirit, by Noël Coward) premiered in Graz in November 1974. For the next few years the Wallaces toured shows like Samuel Beckett's Happy Days around the provinces. The IT found its first permanent home in Vienna's 9th district, at the disused Rossauer Cinema on Glasergasse. After several years there, it moved to its present home on January 14, 1980. After the death of her husband William in 2001, Marilyn Wallace assumed the role of executive producer.

== Operation ==
The IT was run as a traditional, around-the year playhouse, with a season lasting from mid-September until beginning of July the next year. Between 4 and 6 productions were presented each season, all produced in-house. The programme relied on long-runs, with occasional repertoire phases, runs lasting between 7 and 18 weeks. Some productions have run for a considerably longer period. All aspects of theatrical productions, including casting, directing, scenery, costume and property production, were covered by in-house staff. Don Fenner held the post of artistic director for over twenty years and was also the theatre's technical director. Upon his retirement in 2005, these duties were split between the current artistic director, Jack Babb, and a technical director. For over twenty years, the Fundus, a thrust-like studio space in the cellar of the Servitenkirche was used as a second theatre. In recent years, no productions have been mounted there, seemingly due to "building restrictions". During a short period in the mid-1990s, a repertory system operated at IT, with both the Funds and the Main Stage presenting productions simultaneously. In late 2009, the diocese did not renew the lease contract for the Fundus and told the management that it would have to vacate the space. The Fundus, which had been closed for several months, was abandoned in February 2010.

== Controversy ==
The IT received an annual subvention from the City of Vienna, the amount decreasing steadily with each new year. In 2005, the council launched a theatre reform and appointed an evaluation jury to cut back on the number of theatres it supported. The IT, along with numerous other small companies, did not receive a recommendation and the jury suggested termination of the financial support, which would have resulted in the theatre's closure for good. The crisis was averted by the intervention of ex-mayor Helmut Zilk on the theatre's behalf. The subvention was then cut back severely.

In 2005, the Kontrollamt, the council's auditing body, investigated the theatre's financial records, unearthing major inconsistencies and hinting at fraudulent methods and tax evasion. The theatre was fined and had to re-pay a third of the subvention of the following three years to the council. The tabloid press launched a campaign against the theatre on the basis of the Kontrollamt's reports. Wallace never issued an official response to the allegations and the matter soon vanished from the news items.

== Closure ==
In May 2012, the City of Vienna announced that it would suspend all further payments to the theatre. The theatre's closure followed on June 30, 2012 after 37 years of operation and a final performance of Alan Ayckbourn's comedy "Relatively Speaking". Wallace retired on July 1. The premises of the theatre stood empty for years until in late 2016, a new German-speaking company moved in, carried out cosmetic renovation work and renamed the place "Bronski & Grünberg".

Marilyn Wallace (née Close) died on February 16, 2022, aged 92.
