= Michael Hebenstreit =

Austrian musical composer

Michael Hebenstreit (ca 1812 – after 1875) was an Austrian Kapellmeister and composer for stage music.

== Life ==
Almost nothing has been handed down about Hebenstreit's life, only a few scores have survived. He was a successor to Adolf Müller senior as Kapellmeister as well as in the field of stage music and often worked together with Johann Nestroy. His place of activity was the Leopoldstädter Theater, which, after being demolished and rebuilt under director Carl Carl, was renamed the Carltheater in December 1847, where he worked until his death in 1875.

After the premiere of Höllenangst on 17 November 1849, the Österreichische Courier of 20 November 1849 (No 276, p. 1104) wrote rather derogatory about Hebenstreit's music, it would be "mildly marked - mediocre".

Hebenstreit was the discoverer and promoter of the opera singer Etelka Gerster (1855–1920). Since he taught her from 1874 to 1875 at the former Vienna Conservatory, his year of death must be after 1875.

== Compositions (as far as handed down) ==
=== For Johann Nestroy ===
- Liebesgeschichten und Heurathssachen (1843)
- Die schlimmen Buben in der Schule (1847); for the opening of the newly built Carltheater
- Martha oder Die Mischmonder Markt-Mägde-Miethung (1848)
- Die lieben Anverwandten (1848)
- Freiheit in Krähwinkel (1848)
- Lady und Schneider (1849)
- Judith und Holofernes (Nestroy) (1849)
- Der alte Mann mit der jungen Frau (1849)
- Höllenangst (1849)
- Der holländische Bauer (1850)
- Karikaturen-Charivari mit Heurathszweck (1850)

=== For other authors ===
- Josef Kilian Schickh:
  - Das Zauber-Diadem oder Abenteuer eines Stubenmädels (1836).
- Wilhelm Turteltaub:
  - Nur eine löst den Zauberspruch, oder Wer ist glücklich? (1841).
- Friedrich Hopp:
  - Doktor Faust's Hauskäppchen oder Die Herberge im Walde (ca 1850)
  - Der Pelzpalatin und der Kachelofen, oder Der Jahrmarkt zu Rautenbrunn (1853).
- Friedrich Kaiser:
  - Eine Posse als Medizin (1850).
  - Mönch und Soldat (1850).
  - Dienstbothenwirthschaft, oder Chatoulle und Uhr (1852).
  - Müller und Schiffmeister (1853).
