= Franz Xaver Told =

Austrian soldier and dramatist

Franz Xaver Told (from 1840 Franz Xaver Told von Doldenburg; 13 December 1792 – 14 April 1849) was an Austrian soldier, and a prolific dramatist. His plays were staged at the Theater in der Josefstadt in Vienna.

== Life ==
=== Soldier and writer ===
Told, whose father came from the Tyrol, was born in Vienna and was educated in Innsbruck. He joined the Austrian army in 1809; in 1813 he took part in the Battle of Leipzig and the Battle of Hanau. He was promoted to Leutnant in 1827 and Oberleutnant in 1835, and in 1840 he was ennobled with the title "von Doldenburg". His regiment was stationed in Vienna and he probably continued to serve in the army as his literary career started, but later he retired, becoming a titular captain.

Like his contemporaries in Vienna, Karl Meisl and Josef Alois Gleich, he was a prolific writer of plays. He wrote in the genre Zauberspiel, for the Theater in der Josefstadt. His first successful play was Der Ritt um den Kynast in 1818, and was followed by many more. It is thought that Told was not the author of all the dramas attributed to him, which vary in style and quality. He also wrote fiction for magazines, and novellas published as paperbacks.

=== Der Zauberschleier ===
His greatest success was Der Zauberschleier ("The Magic Veil"), first performed in February 1842 at the Theater in der Josefstadt. It had music by Anton Emil Titl, who composed the music for many of his other plays. The 100th performance took place in June of that year. The 200th performance, on 10 February 1843, was attended by the Emperor and members of his family; the day was treated as in Vienna as a folk festival. In November 1846 it had its 300th performance. Franz Pokorny, who owned the Theater in der Josefstadt, later moved the play to the Theater an der Wien, which he had bought in 1845, and the play subsequently reached over 400 performances.

=== Later years ===
Told spent the substantial income from his successful plays on high living. He suffered strokes in 1845; the revolutionary events of 1848 caused his plays to disappear from the repertoire, and his income from them stopped. He died in 1849 aged 56, in a house for invalids in Neulerchenfeld near Vienna.

== Critics' opinions ==
The writer and journalist Isaak Jeitteles (Julius Seidlitz) wrote: "Without original creative powers, he never rises above mediocrity, his figures are blurred in mist, they have no firm will, no basis founded on the character itself.... And Told has recently published again a few volumes of novellas! Poor public!" His plays are referred to by his biographer in Biographisches Lexikon des Kaiserthums Oesterreich (1882) as "Theaterplunder": "theatrical rubbish".
