= Anton Emil Titl =

Austrian composer and conductor

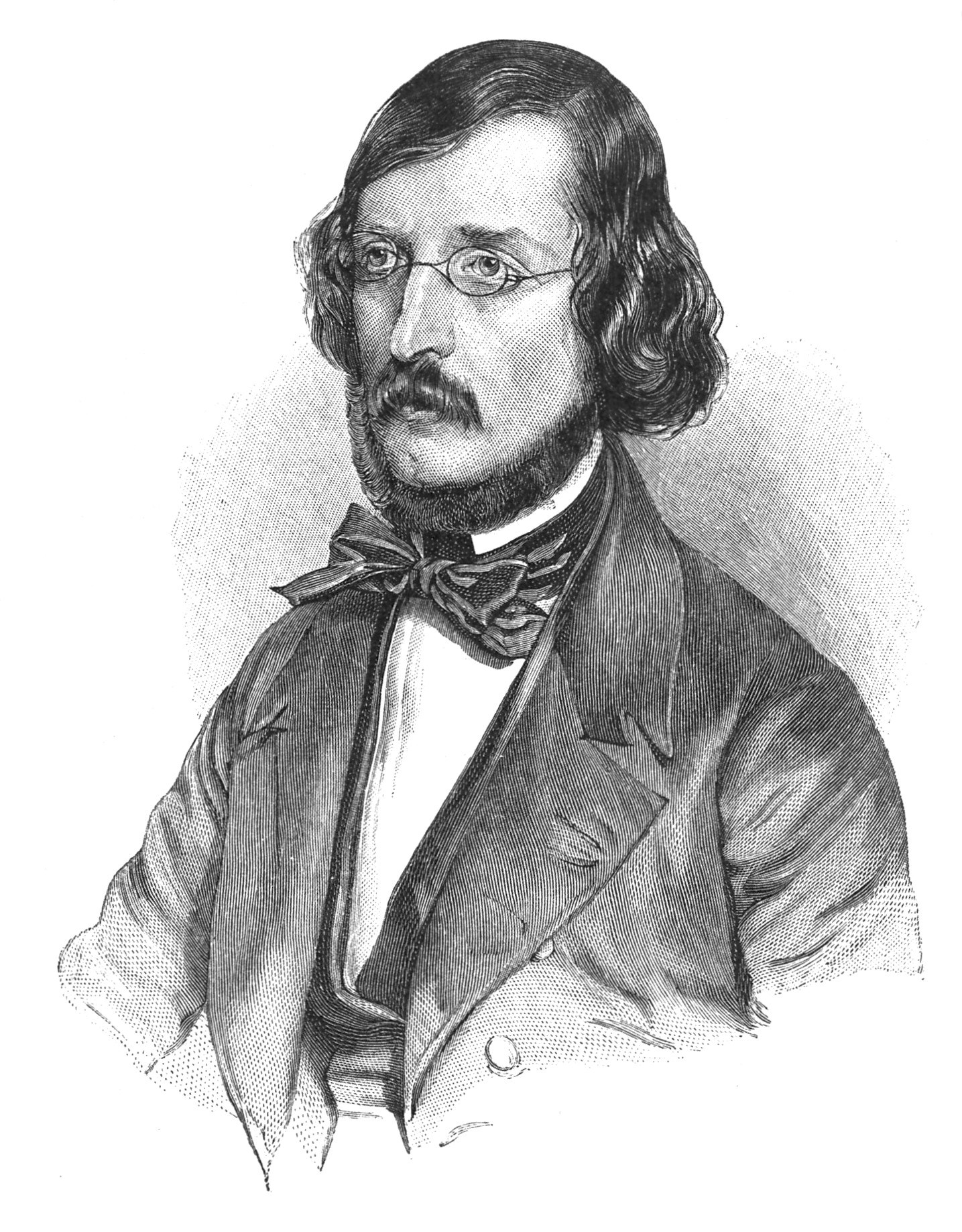
Lithograph by Franz Eybl

Anton Emil Titl (2 October 1809 – 21 January 1882) was an Austrian composer and conductor. In Vienna he was Kapellmeister at the Theater in der Josefstadt and later at the Hofburgtheater.

== Life ==
Anton Emil Titl (born Antonius Franciscus Seraphic Titl/Antonín František Serafinský Titl) was born in Nedvědice in Moravia, at that time part of the Austrian Empire; it is also the location of Pernštejn Castle, where his father Antonius Titl served as burgrave for Count Wilhelm Mitrovský. His mother's maiden name was Theresia Ulrich. After his father's death when he was 14, the Count sent him to Frankstadt (now Nový Malín) to be trained as a teacher. At age 17 he moved to Brǜnn (Brno) to continue his training, but preferred to attend music classes of Gottfried Rieger; he also played in the orchestra of the civic theatre in the town. He was married to Antonia Appelt and had a daughter Emma. He died in Vienna in 1882.

=== Early compositions ===
He composed an overture to Goethe's play Torquato Tasso, and a symphony, which were well received in Brǜnn and Vienna. Antonín Boček of Olmütz (Olomouc) wrote for him the libretto for an opera Die Burgfrau auf dem Schlosse Pernstein (1829), the first opera on a Moravian subject. It was performed successfully in Olmütz and Brǜnn. He wrote a mass in 1832 for the enthronement of prince-bishop Ferdinand Maria Chotek von Chotkow at Olmütz, which was performed in Prague and Vienna.

For a few years he was a teacher in Olmütz, also composing songs and piano pieces, which were published; his "Gondellied" ("Gondola song") became popular.

=== Prague and Vienna ===
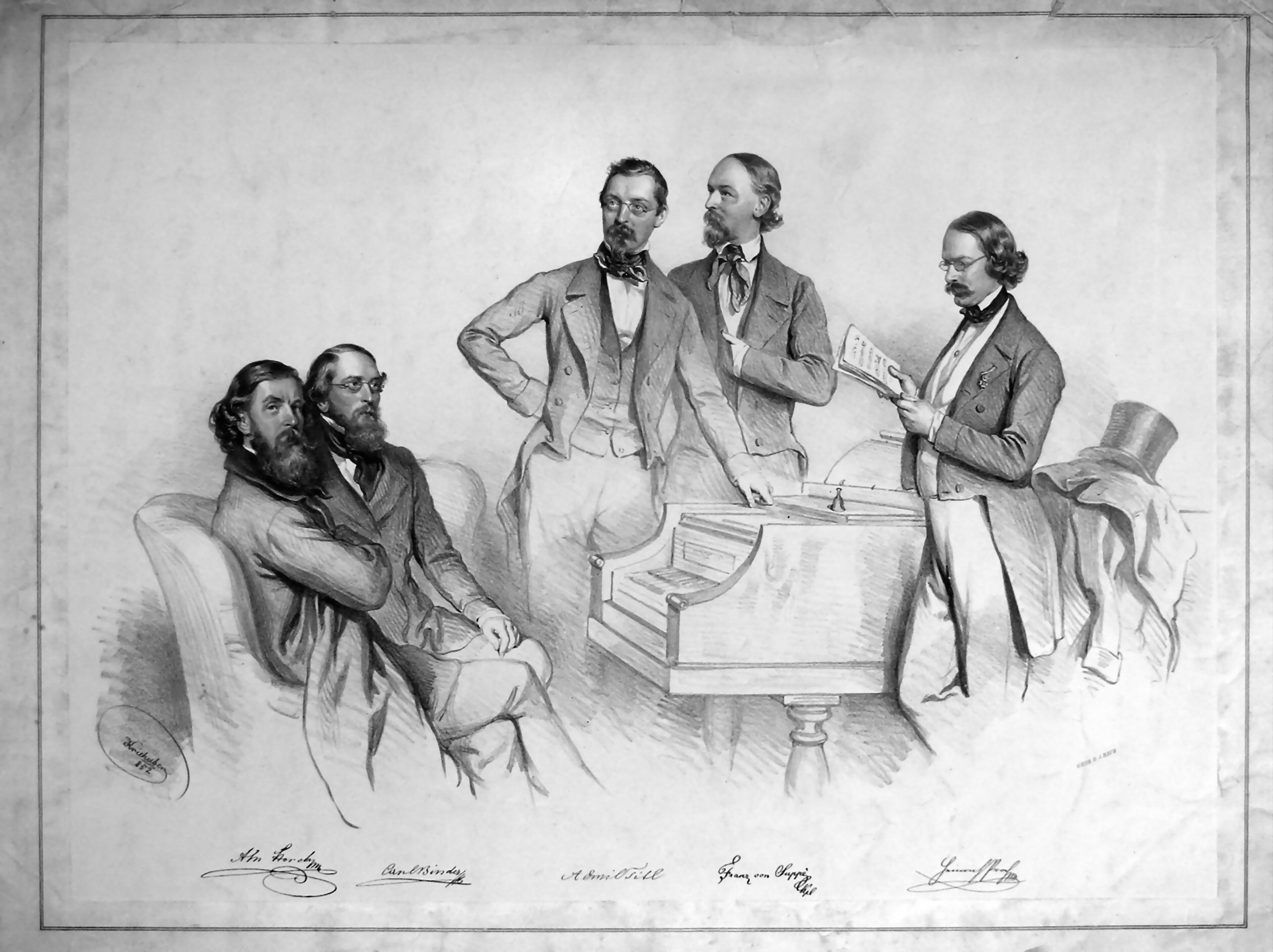
Lithograph by Josef Kriehuber depicting Anton M. Storch, Carl Binder, Anton Emil Titl, Franz von Suppé and Heinrich Proch (1852)

In 1835 Titl was appointed conductor of a military band in Prague. In 1840 he succeeded Heinrich Proch as Kapellmeister at the Theater in der Josefstadt in Vienna, which was under the management of Franz Pokorny. He composed music for the stage works performed there, including many Singspiele by Franz Xaver Told, of which Der Zauberschleier, oder Maler, Fee und Wirtin (1842) was very successful. His biographer in Allgemeine Deutsche Biographie (1894) wrote: "Often enough, he was obliged to save the life of weak farces with 'appealing' music...."

Other Singspiele he created music for with libretti by Told included Wastl, oder Die böhmischen Amazonen (1841) and Der Todtentanz (1843). Told also wrote the libretto for his two act opera Das Wolkenkind (1845). From 1850 he was Kapellmeister at the Hofburgtheater in Vienna, and composer of music for plays performed there, writing incidental music and about 50 overtures. He retired from the Hofburgtheater in 1870. Soon afterwards he wrote music for Franz Grillparzer's trilogy of plays Das goldene Vlies. Titl died in Vienna in 1882.
