= Eduard Castle =

Austrian literary historian (1875–1959)

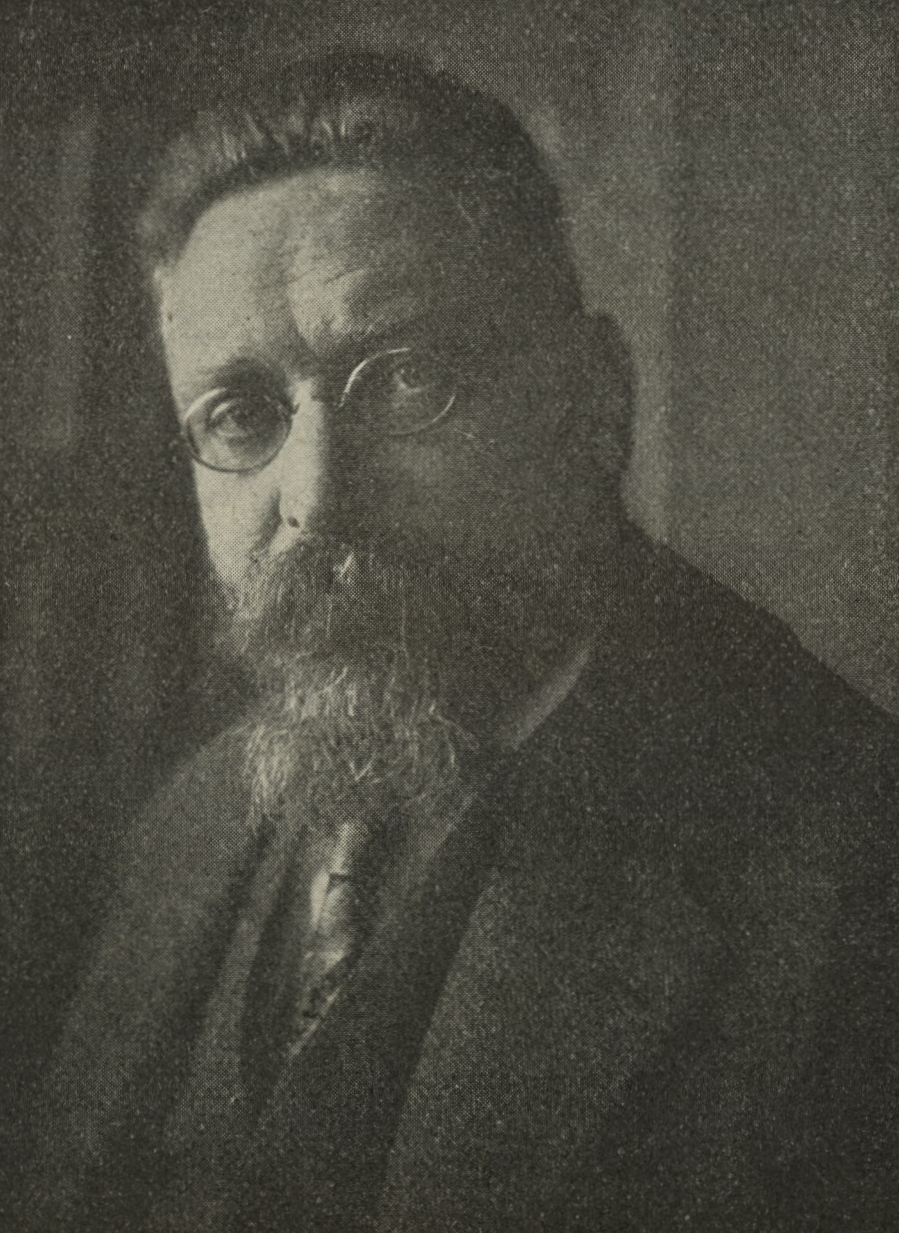
Eduard Castle, before 1927

Eduard Castle (7 November 1875 – 8 June 1959) was an Austrian Germanist, literary historian and theatre scholar.

== Life ==
Castle studied German studies under Jakob Minor and Richard Heinzel, history under Max Büdinger, and geography under Albrecht Penck at the University of Vienna. He received his doctorate (Dr. phil.) in 1897 and subsequently taught at secondary schools in Vienna and Görz.

In 1907, Castle habilitated in modern German language and literature at the University of Vienna. He was appointed full professor there in 1915, and in 1913 he also received the venia legendi in the form of an extraordinary personal professorship at the Vienna Technical University. His Austrian-centered outlook placed him in scholarly opposition to proponents of Pan-German literary interpretation, so that his views only gradually gained acceptance. In 1929, Castle also took on a teaching position at the Vienna Consular Academy.

Alongside his teaching duties, Castle published numerous scholarly works, addressing among others Charles Sealsfield, Joseph Schreyvogel, Ferdinand Raimund, Adalbert Stifter, Richard Kralik, Peter Rosegger, Anton Wildgans and Franz Werfel, as well as Johann Wolfgang von Goethe, Friedrich Schiller and Gerhart Hauptmann. He edited the works of Nikolaus Lenau (six volumes, 1910–1923), Ferdinand Raimund (six volumes, 1924), Ludwig Anzengruber (20 volumes, 1922) and Franz Grillparzer (six volumes, 1923).

Castle contributed to the Deutsch-Österreichische Literaturgeschichte (German-Austrian Literary History), begun in 1899 by J. W. Nagl and J. Zeidler (Volume 3: 1935, Volume 4: 1937), and edited Austrian classics. He also worked, largely in leading positions, in the Wiener Goethe-Verein, the Grillparzer Society and the Adalbert Stifter Society, and was a member of the Austrian Academy of Sciences.

After the Anschluss of Austria in 1938, the 63-year-old Castle was dismissed from his post. He continued to devote his time to Germanic studies, particularly to source research for the biography of Charles Sealsfield, and in 1943 delivered the festival lecture marking the 150th anniversary of Sealsfield's birth in Znaim.

After World War II, Castle was instrumental in resuming academic activity at the University of Vienna. He was retired in 1949.

Castle died in 1959 at his residence on Liechtensteinstraße 11 in Vienna and was buried at the Ober Sankt Veit Cemetery. A memorial plaque on his residence commemorates him.

== Awards ==
- 1950: Honorary Medal of the Federal Capital Vienna
- 1953: Vienna Prize for Humanities

== Publications ==
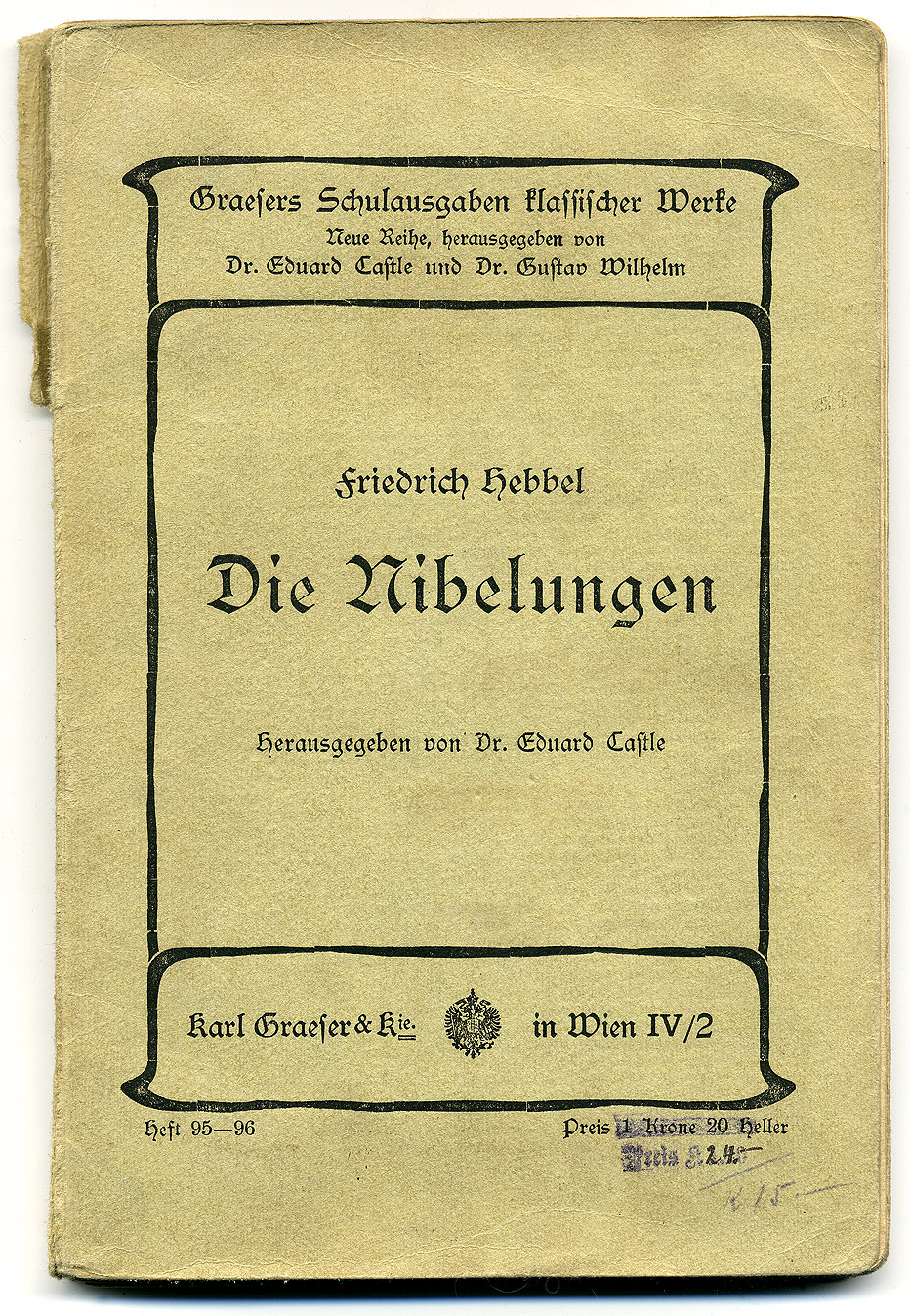
Friedrich Hebbel's Die Nibelungen, edited by Eduard Castle

As author

- Die Isolierten, Vienna 1899
- Nikolaus Lenau, 1902
- Lenau und die Familie Löwenthal. Briefe und Gespräche, Gedichte und Entwürfe, Leipzig: Max Hesse, 1906
- Fürst Schwarzenberg, 1925
- Der große Unbekannte. Das Leben von Charles Sealsfield, Vienna 1943
- Dichter und Dichtung aus Österreich, 1952

As editor

- Ludwig Anzengruber: Gesammelte Werke (20 vols.)
- Franz Grillparzer: Werke (6 vols.)
- Anastasius Grün: Gesammelte Werke (6 vols.)
- Nikolaus Lenau: Werkausgabe (6 vols.)
- (with Fritz Brukner) Ferdinand Raimund: Werke (6 vols.)
- Chronik des Wiener Goethe-Vereins, 1933 ff.
- Gespräche mit Goethe in den letzten Jahren seines Lebens 1823–1832, with index by Eduard Castle, Berlin 1916
