= Moritz Gottlieb Saphir =

Austrian satirical writer and journalist

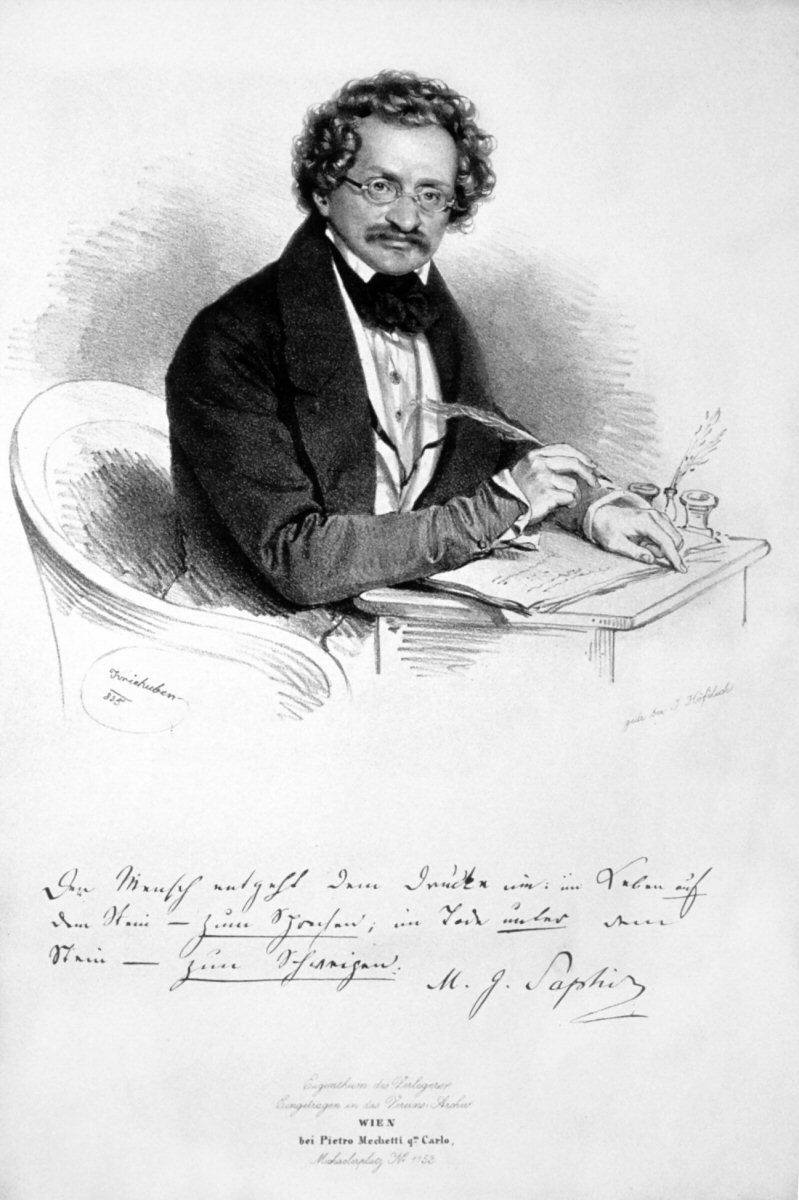
Lithograph (1835) by Joseph Kriehuber

Moritz Gottlieb Saphir, born Moses Saphir (8 February 1795 in Lovasberény – 5 September 1858 in Baden bei Wien) was a Hungarian-Jewish satirical writer and journalist.

== Life ==
Saphir was the son of the merchant Gottlieb (Israel) Saphir and his wife Charlotte Brüll. During the reign of Joseph II, all Jewish subjects had been required to take a family name, and Israel Saphir was the first in the family to use that surname. Moses was sent to the yeshiva in Bratislava to become a rabbi. At the age of eleven, he fell out with his family and made a risky journey to Prague to attend that city's yeshiva instead.

Shortly afterwards he encountered mainstream European literature and began to study English, German, and the Romance languages. In 1814, his family removed all financial support and he was forced to return home. Nevertheless he was allowed some time later to travel to Pest, Hungary in order to study Latin and Greek. It was in Pest that he embarked on a literary career. His first book, Poetische Erstlinge (1821), was received with enthusiasm. He was invited to Vienna by the publisher Adolf Bäuerle to write for the Wiener Theaterzeitung. However, Saphir's merciless reviews and essays were so unpopular that in 1825 he was sacked, whereupon he left for Berlin, where he edited the arts pages of the Berliner Schnellpost für Literatur, Theater und Geselligkeit, also contributing to the Berliner Courier and Berliner Theateralmanachs auf das Jahr 1828.

On 3 December 1827, he founded the Tunnel über der Spree literary society, as a kind of "personal bodyguard" according to Theodor Fontane. However, as an eloquent satirist he made more enemies in Berlin, and his prominent associates in the society could not (or eventually, would not) always help him out of scrapes. The playwright Kurt Schall challenged him to a duel, and a satirical poem about Henriette Sontag in the Spenerschen Zeitung even led to a short term of imprisonment.

In 1829, he went to Munich where he helped found Der Bazar (1830) and Der deutsche Horizont (1831). Once again his satires (in this case an attack on the Bavarian royalty) resulted in imprisonment and deportation. Fleeing to Paris, he quickly achieved fame through a series of lectures, and he received an invitation from Louis Philippe I, but he returned to Bavaria in 1831 and took over the editorship of the Bayerische Beobachter. The following year he converted to Protestantism. His apologetic manner and newfound restraint resulted in official forgiveness, and even an appointment as a functionary in the Royal Bavarian Court Theatre.

In 1834, he returned to Vienna, which was to remain his main residence for the rest of his life. He was forbidden to start his own newspaper, and worked instead for the Theaterzeitung. On 1 January 1837, the ban was lifted and on the same day he founded Der Humorist (1837-1862), a daily satirical publication which he edited until his death in 1858. During the Revolution of 1848 he became the first head of a Revolutionary Writers' Association, but with the continuation of unrest he resigned and retreated to Baden until the situation had resolved. The restraint displayed in his later work meant that a new generation of writers began to see him as "reactionary". His enmity towards Johann Nestroy and friendship with Ignaz Franz Castelli are well-known. He also made lecture tours throughout Germany, France and Austria. After returning from one such trip he separated from his wife.

In the summer of 1858 he travelled to Baden, where he died on 5 September at the age of 63. His last words were "Now all is over, I have to go." The executor of his will was Friedrich Hebbel. He was buried in the Matzleinsdorf Protestant Cemetery (1/168) in Vienna.

== Works ==
- Poetische Erstlinge (1821)
- Konditorei des Jokus (1828)
- Dumme Briefe (1834)
- Pariser Briefe über Leben, Kunst, Gesellschaft und Industrie zur Zeit der Weltausstellung im Jahre 1855 (1856)
- Deklamatorische Soirée (1858)

=== Newspapers founded ===
- Mitternachtsblatt für den Sternenhimmel der Laune und des Humors (1830)
- Der deutsche Horizont. Ein humoristisches Blatt für Zeit, Geist und Sitte (Jaquet, München, 1.1831-4.1834)
- Der Humorist. Eine Zeitschrift für Scherz und Ernst, Kunst, Theater, Geselligkeit und Sitte (Bolte, Wien, 1.1837-25.1862), sometimes accompanied by a Humoristisch-satyrischer Volkskalender (1.1851-8.1858). Information and facsimiles provided by ANNO

== Bibliography ==
- Anton Schlossar (1890). "Saphir, Moritz" . Allgemeine Deutsche Biographie (in German). Vol. 30. Leipzig: Duncker & Humblot. pp. 364–369.
- Saphir, Moritz Gottlieb. In: Constantin von Wurzbach: Biographisches Lexikon des Kaiserthums Oesterreich. 28. Band. Wien 1874.
- Jacob Toury: M. G. Saphir und K. Beck. In: Walter Grab u.a. (Hrsg.): Juden im Vormärz und in der Revolution 1848. Burgverlag, Stuttgart 1983, ISBN 3-922801-61-7
- Peter Sprengel: Moritz Gottlieb Saphir in Berlin. Journalismus und Biedermeierkultur. In: Günter Blamberger, Manfred Engel und Monika Ritzer (eds.): Studien zur Literatur des Frührealismus. Ulrich Fülleborn zur Emeritierung. Lang Verlag, Frankfurt a. M. 1991, S. 243–275.
- Wulf Wülfing: Folgenreiche Witze. Moritz Gottlieb Saphir. In: Joachim Dyck u.a. (Hrsg.): Rhetorik. Ein internationales Jahrbuch. Band 12: Rhetorik im 19. Jahrhundert. Niemeyer Verlag, Tübingen 1993, ISBN 3-484-60389-5, S. 73–83.
