= Adolf Bäuerle =

Austrian playwright and author

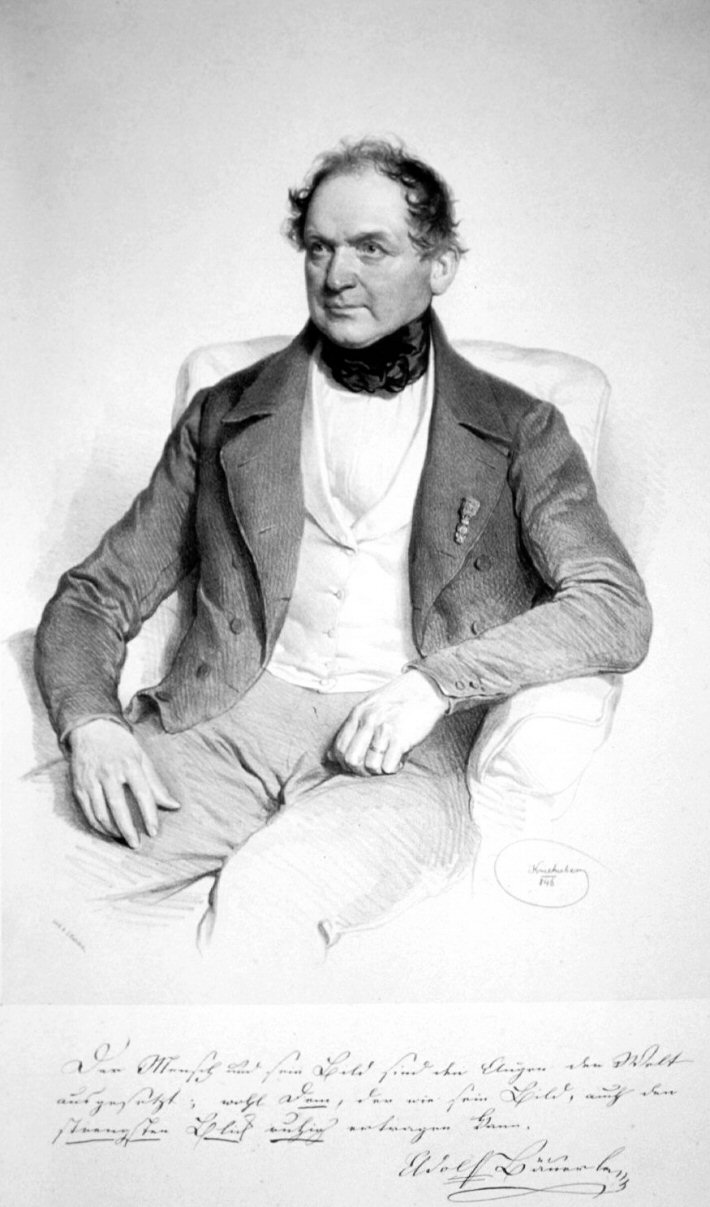
Adolf Bäuerle, lithograph by Joseph Kriehuber 1846

Adolf Bäuerle (real name Johann Andreas Bäuerle (9 or 10 April 1786 – 20 September 1859) was an Austrian writer, publisher and main representative of the Alt-Wiener Volkstheater.

== Life ==
Born in Vienna, 1802 Bäuerle made his debut with the novel Sigmund der Stählerne, which, however, was rejected. After his school time in Vienna Bäuerle got a job as a court official.

At the age of eighteen Bäuerle founded the Wiener Theaterzeitung in 1804. Until 1847 it was the most widely circulated newspaper in Austria. Between 1808 and 1828 Bäuerle worked in Vienna as a secretary at the Leopoldstädter Theater and favoured the Volkstheater by virtue of his office. From 1828 he was almost exclusively active in the editorial office of his Theaterzeitung and engaged the witty writer Moritz Gottlieb Saphir.

After the death of his first wife in 1828 he married the actress Katharina Ennöckl on 3 May 1829, with whom he already had a relationship for years before.

In 1848 he founded the magazine Die Geißel, which played an important role during the revolutionary year. The resulting difficulties with the authorities led him to create the Volksboten in December 1848. This newspaper later became the Wiener Telegraph.

Since his school days Bäuerle wrote, but it was not until 1852 that he was able to publish his first novel. In his early work the pseudonyms J. H. Fels and Otto Horn dominate. With his literary work Bäuerle founded the Wiener Lokalroman. In 1813 he created the figure of the umbrella maker "Chrysostomus Staberl" in Die Bürger in Wien, with which he replaced the Hanswurst and the Kasperl. Together with Josef Alois Gleich and Karl Meisl Bäuerle belonged to the "great three" of the Old Viennese Volkstheater before Ferdinand Raimund.

The legal aftermath of his participation in the March Revolution ruined him financially and also his health. When Bäuerle had to fear for his freedom, he fled to Basel on 17 June 1859 at age 73. There Bäuerle died about a quarter of a year later in the night from 19 to 20 September 1859. In 1869 Bäuerle's remains were exhumed and transferred from Basel to the family crypt at Schloss Erlaa.

== Work ==
- Kinder und Narren reden die Wahrheit, 1806
- Die Bürger in Wien, 1813
- Tankred, 1817
- Eipeldauer-Briefe, 1819–1821
- Doctor Fausts Mantel, Vienna 1820 (Reprint: Munich 1990)
- Aline oder Wien in einem anderen Weltteil, 1822
- Die Dame mit dem Todtenkopfe, novel, 1855 (Reprint: Munich 1990)
- Zahlheim. Ein Wiener Criminal-Roman, 1856
- Das eingemauerte Mädchen, Vienna 1857 (Reprint: Munich 1990)
- Memoiren. First volume. Lechner in Kommission, Vienna 1858 (Digital link; no longer published)
