= University of Graz Library =

Scientific and public library in Austria

Coordinates: 47°4′42″N 15°27′2″E

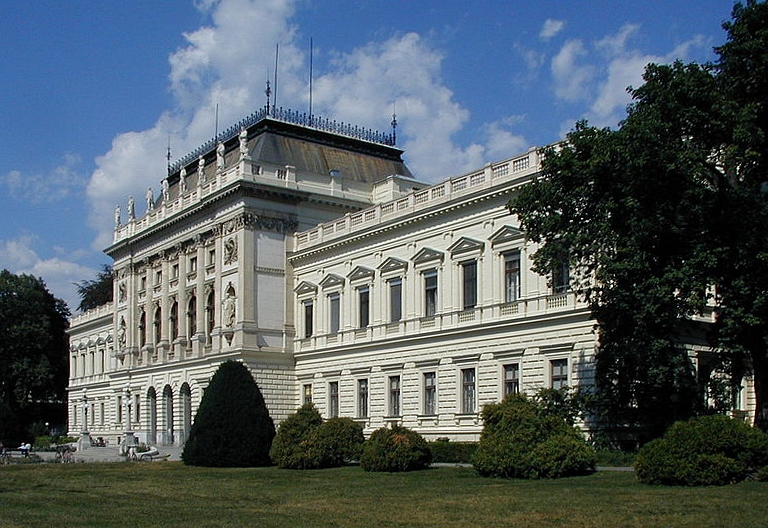
University of Graz

The University of Graz Library (German: Universitätsbibliothek Graz) in Graz, Austria is the largest research and public library in Styria and the third largest in Austria. It holds the right of legal deposit. It is part of the University of Graz and consists of the main library, two faculty libraries (for law and social and economic sciences, and for theology) and several branch libraries and is open to the public.

== History ==
=== Jesuit university library ===
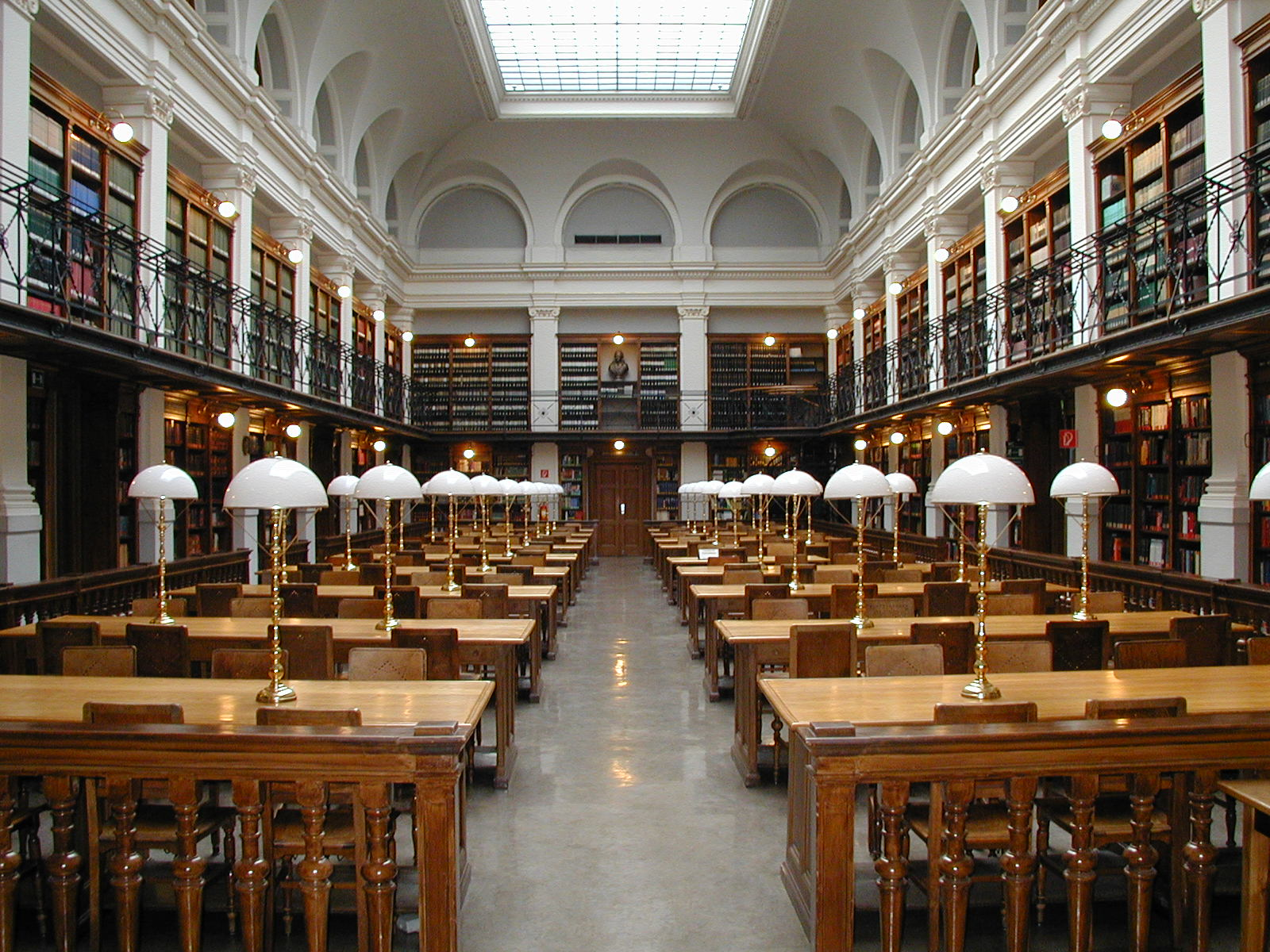
Historical reading room

The University of Graz Library owes its origin to the Counter-Reformation. Since 1571 the Jesuits had been pushing the re-catholization in the predominantly Protestant city of Graz according to the wishes of the Archduke Charles II of Austria. For that reason a Jesuit college with a school and a library were founded next to the cathedral in 1573. In 1585 this school was confirmed by Pope Gregory XIII as a Jesuit University, thus the library came into the status of a university library. It grew rapidly because many books got transferred from monasteries to Graz and because of donations and continuous purchases. The university was more or less a theological faculty, and the library's main focus in purchasing books was also theology – but not necessarily Catholic theology. Natural sciences were well represented due to the influence of the mathematician Paul Guldin, who was one of the university professors. When the Jesuit order was abolished in 1773 the university became a state university.

=== Public university library ===
In 1775 the university was officially founded again by a decree and was put under national control together with its library. However, most of the imperial officials who administrated the university as well as the library were former Jesuits. In 1781 the library was re-opened after several adjustments of its new premises and became open for the public for the first time. The 28 volume library catalogue was untraceable, it might have been taken away or destroyed by some glowering Jesuits and has never been detected until today. The considerable increase of books from monasteries aggravated the chaos.

=== Lyceum library ===
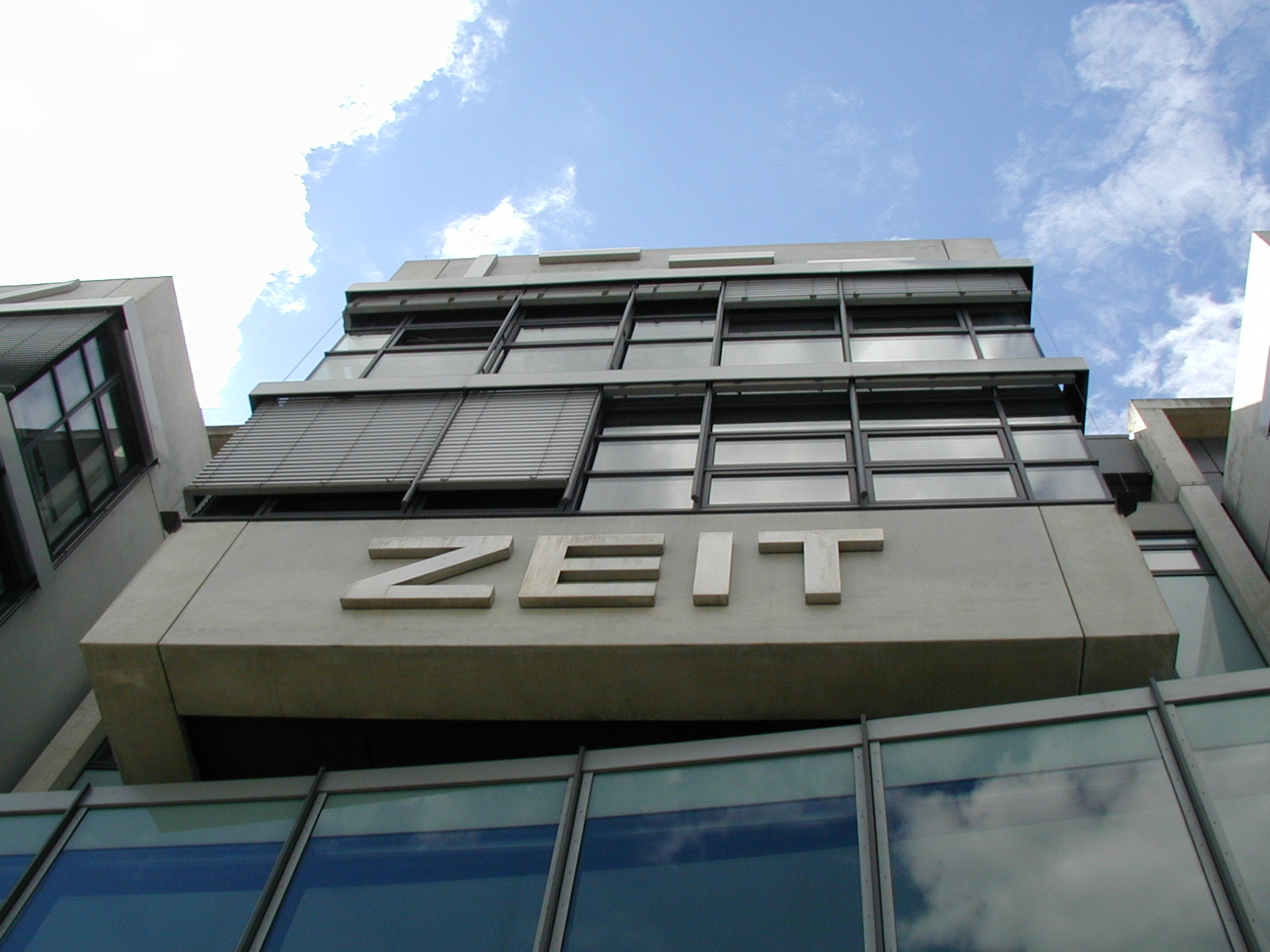
New front built between 1994 and 1996

As well as several other universities the University of Graz was downgraded to the status of lyceum in 1782 by the emperor Josef II. Its collections increased nonetheless.

=== Re-established university library ===
On 19 April 1827, after 45 years, the old rights were reconfirmed by Emperor Francis I of Austria. Since then the university's name has included both founders: Karl-Franzens-Universität Graz. Along with the reinstallation was a requirement: the university must not incur any additional costs to the state. Therefore, it remained dependent on donations and bequests. It was only after the number of personnel was increased from three to six and the endowment from 830 to 4,000 guilder in 1870 that the university could again accomplish its tasks properly.

=== From relocation to the end of World War II ===
Due to the limited space in the city centre, a new complex of buildings was erected in the periphery (present-day Geidorf) in 1891. The various buildings were opened at different times. Between 9 and 22 September 1895, the library moved 135,000 volumes to the main building of the new university. Its further development in stock increase and administration suffered heavy setbacks in both world wars. 60,000 volumes were evacuated to save them from air raids in 1944. On 22 October 1945 the library was reopened. 4,500 volumes (including 200 incunabula) had been destroyed during World War II.

=== Latest developments ===
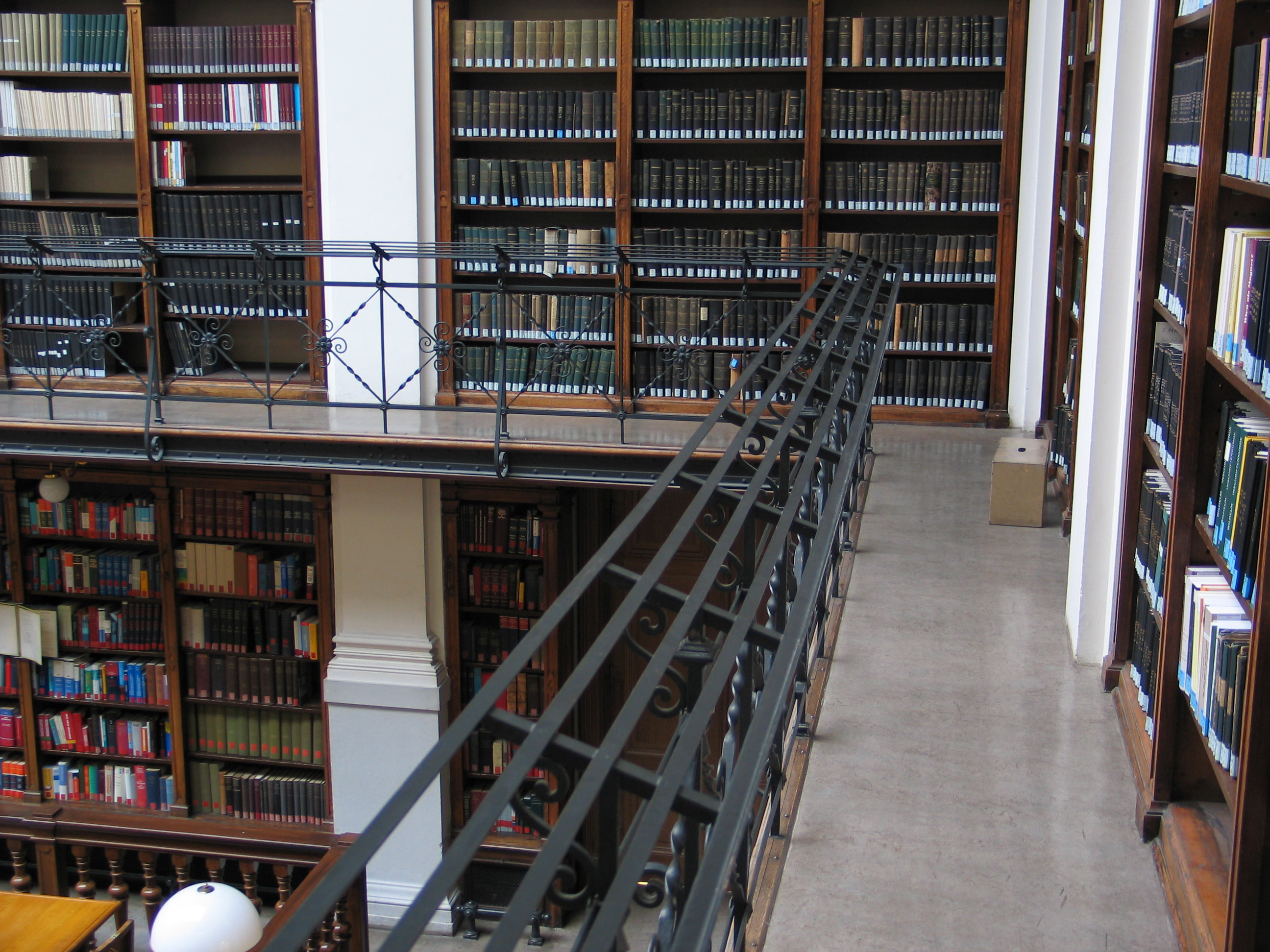
Gallery of the main reading room

The second half of the 20th century is predominantly characterized by constructional changes and progressive decentralisation. In 1950 both stacks situated edgeways behind the reading room got an annex in the south-east. 1970 a new building (of no architectural value whatsoever) was added-on to the old house with a new entrance and hall. From 1994 to 1996 the ReSoWi-Library which accommodates the Law and Social and Economic Sciences Libraries was built. At the same time another building was erected directly attached to the library's original front leaving it unaltered. This addition is exclusively used by the library. Additionally, there were several branch libraries opened in some distance to the main library; e.g., in the Universitätszentrum Wall at Merangasse 70. In 1996, a media library for visual media was installed. As a consequence of the university-splitting in 2004, the medical branches became an autonomous university library. Together with the University Libraries of Vienna and Innsbruck Graz has been assuming control of the establishment of national and international consortia installed in order to use electronic journals and books in cooperation and thus more cost-effectively in 1998. On 1 July 2005 the "Cooperation of e-media in Austria" was constituted. The University of Graz Library authoritatively participates in the Austrian Literature Online project, the digitisation of Austrian literature.

== Staff ==
When the library was taken over by the state, it got two employees: the director and a library servant. At the beginning of the 20th century the staff numbered 17, 8 of them being scientific civil servants. At the turn of the millennium the library staff had grown to 120.

Directors of the University of Graz Library under state administration
Term	Director (birth-death), academic position
1773–1774	Josef Bardarini (1708–1791), professor of theology and philosophy, rector of the university
1775–1778	Richard Tecker (1723–1798), professor of dogmatics
1778–1783	Franz de Paula Tomicich (1729–), professor of ecclesiastical law, rector of the university
1783–1797	Augustin Herz
1798–1814	Josef Alois Jüstel (1765–1832), professor of moral theology, rector of the university
1817–1832	Markus Sandmann (1764–1832), author
1833–1852	Johann Krausler (−1852)
1853–1861	Leopold Michelitsch
1861–1866	Karl Kreutzer
1866–1880	Ignaz Tomaschek
1880–1895	Alois Müller (1835–1901), specialist for Hebrew studies
1895–1903	Wilhelm Haas (1842–1918), afterwards director of the University Library of Vienna
1903–1910	Anton Schlossar (1849–1942)
1910–1919	Johannes Peisker (1851–1933), later professor of social and economic history in Prague
1919–1924	Ferdinand Eichler (1863–1945), professor of library sciences
1924–1933	Jakob Fellin (1869–1951)
1934–1945	Franz Gosch (1884–1952)
1945–1953	Wolfgang Benndorf (1901–1959)
1954–1971	Erhard Glas (1906–1992)
1972–1988	Franz Kroller (1923–2000)
1989–2006	Sigrid Reinitzer (1941–)
2004–present	Werner Schlacher (1955–)

== Holdings ==
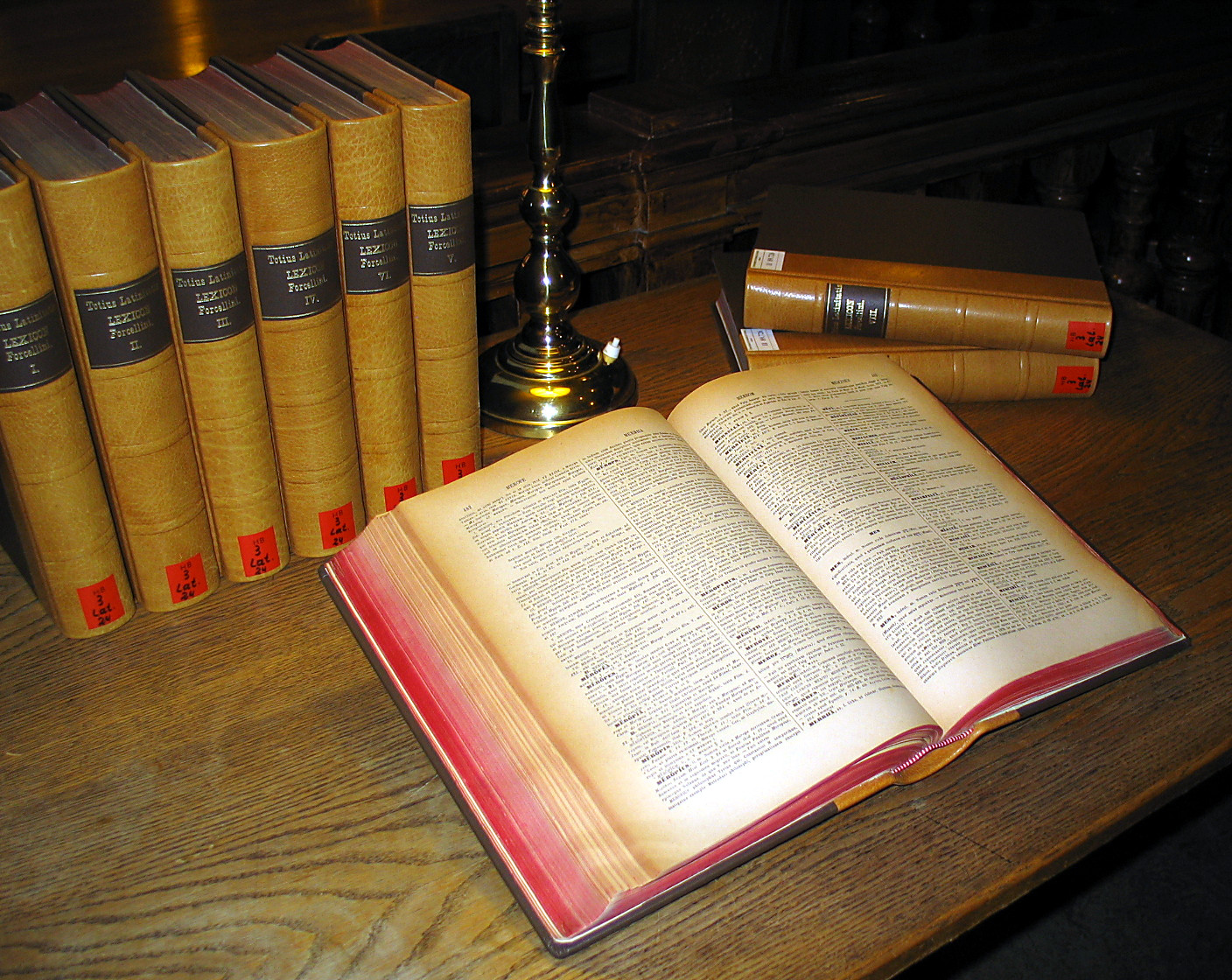
A 19th-century multi-volume Latin dictionary in the reading room

The number of books in the old library is historically uncertain. According to one source there were 10.000 volumes in 1773, and according to another one 42.000 in 1776. Another similarly unreliable source counts 50.000 volumes or fewer for the year 1839. A survey in the year 1860 states 38.000 printed works, many of them had more than one volume. In 1879 the library owned about 100.000 volumes, in the first year of the 20th century 200.000. At the turn of the millennium, the actual stocks were almost 3 million printed books, more than 2000 manuscripts, about 1200 incunabula, bequests of many scholars and about 1400 current periodicals.

== Special collections ==
The Special Collections Department holds all manuscripts and works printed up to 1900. Some of the most notable parchment manuscripts are the five oldest Georgian scripts (7th to 11th century) found in the Saint Catherine's Monastery at the foot of Mount Sinai. Some of the most important paper manuscripts are Johannes Kepler's letters to Paul Guldin.

In 2023, Theresa Zamit Lupi discovered a thread in one of 42 papyrus-manuscripts from Oxyrhynchos dating from 260 BC, which is an indication of a binding in codex form. It is the oldest evidence to date of this pre-book form. The papyri were found by the British Egypt Exploration Society between 1896 and 1907 and entered into the library's possessions as quid pro quo for the city's financial support of the Society's excavations. Today, the greatest part of these findings is located in the Ashmolean Museum in Oxford, the British Museum in London and the Egyptian Museum in Cairo.

== Sources ==
- Manuela Reiter and Sigrid Reinitzer: "University Library of Graz". In: International Dictionary of Library History. Vol. 2. Chicago, London 2001.
