= Osice =

- Municipality
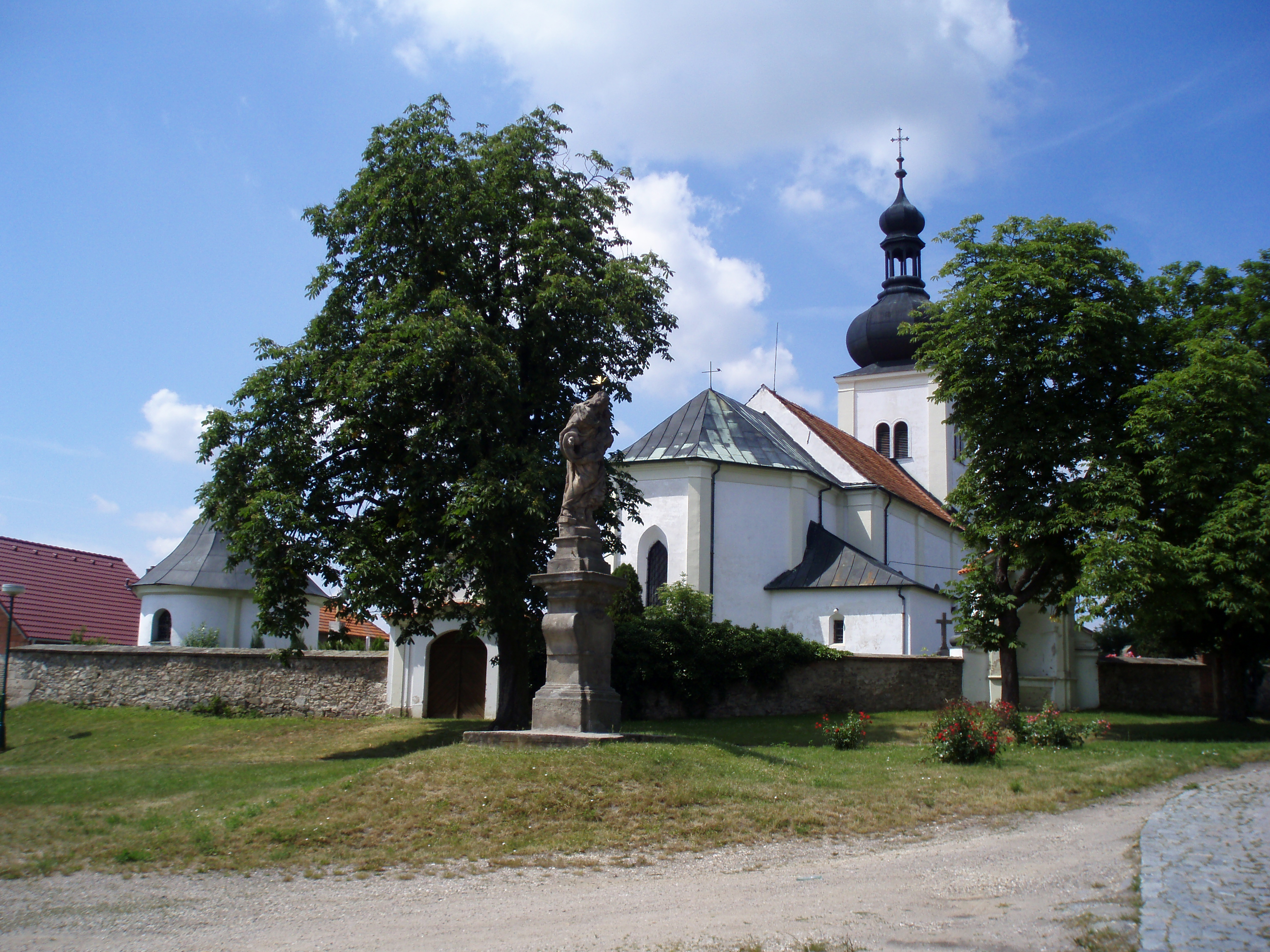
- Church of the Assumption of the Virgin Mary

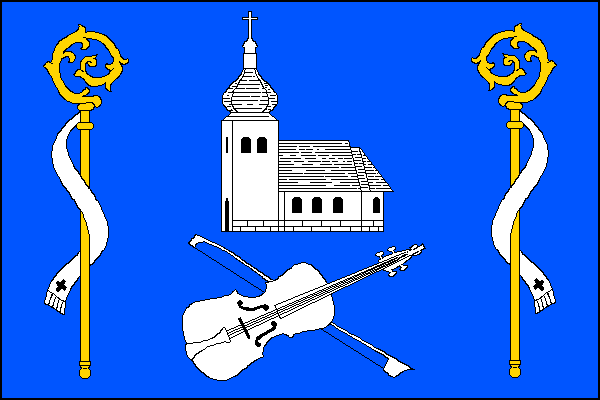
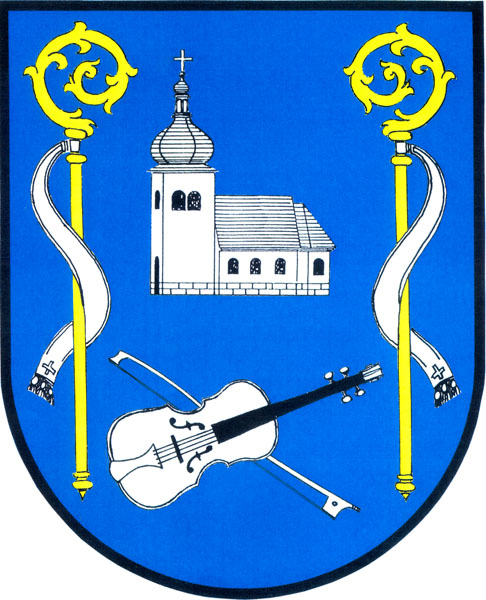
- Flag Coat of arms

- Location in the Czech Republic
- Coordinates: 50°8′34″N 15°41′10″E
- Country: Czech Republic
- Region: Hradec Králové
- District: Hradec Králové
- First mentioned: 1073

Area
  - Total: 7.48 km^{2} (2.89 sq mi)
- Elevation: 270 m (890 ft)

Population (2026-01-01)
  - Total: 566
  - Density: 75.7/km^{2} (196/sq mi)
- Time zone: UTC+1 (CET)
  - Summer (DST): UTC+2 (CEST)
- Postal code: 503 26
- Website: www.osice.cz

Osice (Czech pronunciation: [ˈosɪtsɛ]) is a municipality and village in Hradec Králové District in the Hradec Králové Region of the Czech Republic. It has about 600 inhabitants.

== Administrative division ==
Osice consists of three municipal parts (in brackets population according to the 2021 census):

- Osice (342)
- Polizy (74)
- Trávník (106)

== Demographics ==
Historical population
Year	Pop.	±%
1869	714	—
1880	758	+6.2%
1890	797	+5.1%
1900	763	−4.3%
1910	740	−3.0%
1921	672	−9.2%
1930	682	+1.5%
1950	589	−13.6%
1961	565	−4.1%
1970	516	−8.7%
1980	472	−8.5%
1991	402	−14.8%
2001	404	+0.5%
2011	472	+16.8%
2021	522	+10.6%
Source: Censuses

== Notable people ==
- František Škroup (1801–1862), composer and conductor, author of the Czech national anthem
- Jan Nepomuk Škroup (1811–1892), composer and conductor
