= František Škroup =

Czech composer and conductor (1801–1862)

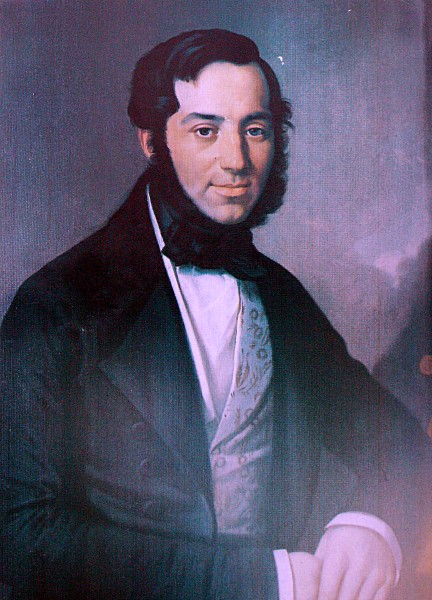
Portrait of Škroup by Antonín Machek

František Jan Škroup (Czech pronunciation: [ˈfrancɪʃɛk jan ˈʃkroup]; 3 June 1801 – 7 February 1862) was a Czech composer and conductor. His brother Jan Nepomuk Škroup was also a successful composer and his father, Dominik Škroup, and other brother Ignác Škroup were lesser known composers. He is the author of the melody for the Czech national anthem "Kde domov můj?".

== Biography ==
Škroup was born on 3 June 1801 in Osice near Hradec Králové in Bohemia. At the age of eleven he moved to Prague where he supported himself as a choir boy and flautist. He continued his schooling at one of the most important Czech national revival movement centres, Hradec Králové, where he was a choirboy at the cathedral. While there he studied with the local choirmaster and composer Franz Volkert. He later moved back to Prague to study at the university. He became a fairly successful opera and singspiel composer producing more than a dozen stage works. Among Škroup's part-time jobs was organist at the "Temple of the Israelite Society for Regulated Worship," known since the late nineteen-forties as the "Spanish synagogue." His last position was as the musical director of the German opera in Dutch Rotterdam. He died in Rotterdam on 7 February 18 and, as a person without means, was buried in a mass grave. He also produced an oratorio, a mass, and a few other sacred works. He is best remembered today as the author of the melody for the Czech national anthem "Kde domov můj?".

== Works ==
From 1827 Škroup was a conductor at the Estates Theatre in Prague. There he led the Czech premières of many famous works by composers such as Richard Wagner. Škroup's oeuvre consists mainly of Czech and German opera which gained significant local popularity.

Opera, Singspiel and Incidental Music

- Dráteník, Singspiel in 2 Acts (1825); libretto by Josef Krasoslav Chmelenský; Škroup sang the title role. Dráteník is considered the first Czech opera.
- Der Nachtschatten, Singspiel (1827); libretto C.J. Schikaneder
- Oldřich a Božena (Oldřich and Božena), Opera (1828); German title: Uldarich und Božena (1833); libretto by Josef Krasoslav Chmelenský
- Der Prinz und die Schlange (The Prince and the Snake, or Amor in the Amazon) (1829); Czech title: Princ a had neb Amor mezi Amazonkami (1835)
- Bratrovrah, Biblical Melodrama (1831); libretto by Jan Nepomuk Štěpánek
- Die Drachenhöhle (1832)
- Fidlovačka aneb Žádný hněv a žádná rvačka (Fidlovačka, or No Anger and No Brawl), Folk Scenes of Prague Life with Song and Dance (1834); play by Josef Kajetán Tyl; includes "Kde domov můj?"
- Libušin sňatek (Libuše's Marriage) (libretto by Josef Krasoslav Chmelenský, 1835, rewritten 1850)
- Čestmír (1835); incidental music to the historical drama
- Pouť k chrámu umění (Pilgrimage to the Temple of Art) (1846)
- The Spectre's Bride
- Drahomíra, Opera (première 20 November 1848); German libretto by V.A. Svoboda-Návarovský
- Žižkova smrt (Žižka's Death) (1850); incidental music to the historical drama by Josef Jiří Kolár
- Der Meergeuse (The Sea Geus), Romantic Opera in 3 Acts (1851); libretto by Johann Carl Hickel; premièred in 2003 at the Estates Theatre in Prague; Czech title: Mořský geus
- Don César a spanilá Magelona (Don Cesar and the Comely Magolena), Incidental Music (1852)
- Columbus, Opera in 3 Acts (1855); original German libretto by Josef Krasoslav Chmelenský; Czech version premièred on 3 February 1942 with libretto translated by František Pujman

Orchestral

- Chrudimská ouvertura (Chrudim Overture) (1854); overture for the opening of the municipal theatre in Chrudim, Bohemia

Chamber music

- String Quartet No. 1 in F major, Op. 24
- String Quartet No. 2 in C minor, Op. 25
- String Quartet No. 3 in G major, Op. 29
- Trio for Clarinet (or Violin), Cello and Piano, Op.27
- Trio facile in F Major for Violin (or Flute), Cello and Piano, Op.28
- Trio facile for Violin (or Flute), Cello and Piano, Op.30

Piano

- Polonaise
- Deutsche Tänze (1824)

Vocal

- Věnec ze zpěvů vlasteneckých uvitý a obětovaný dívkám vlastenským (Wreath of Patriotic Songs Collected for and Dedicated to Patriotic Girls) (1835–1839); 5 volumes edited by Škroup and Chmelenský
- Dobrou noc (Good Night) for Horn, Voice and Harp (or Piano); words by Josef Krasoslav Chmelenský
- Píseň společní; words by František Čelakovský; Both songs are included in Věnec ze zpěvů vlasteneckých uvitý a obětovaný dívkám vlastenským.
- Věnec (1843-1844), second part
