= Klučov (Třebíč District) =

- Municipality
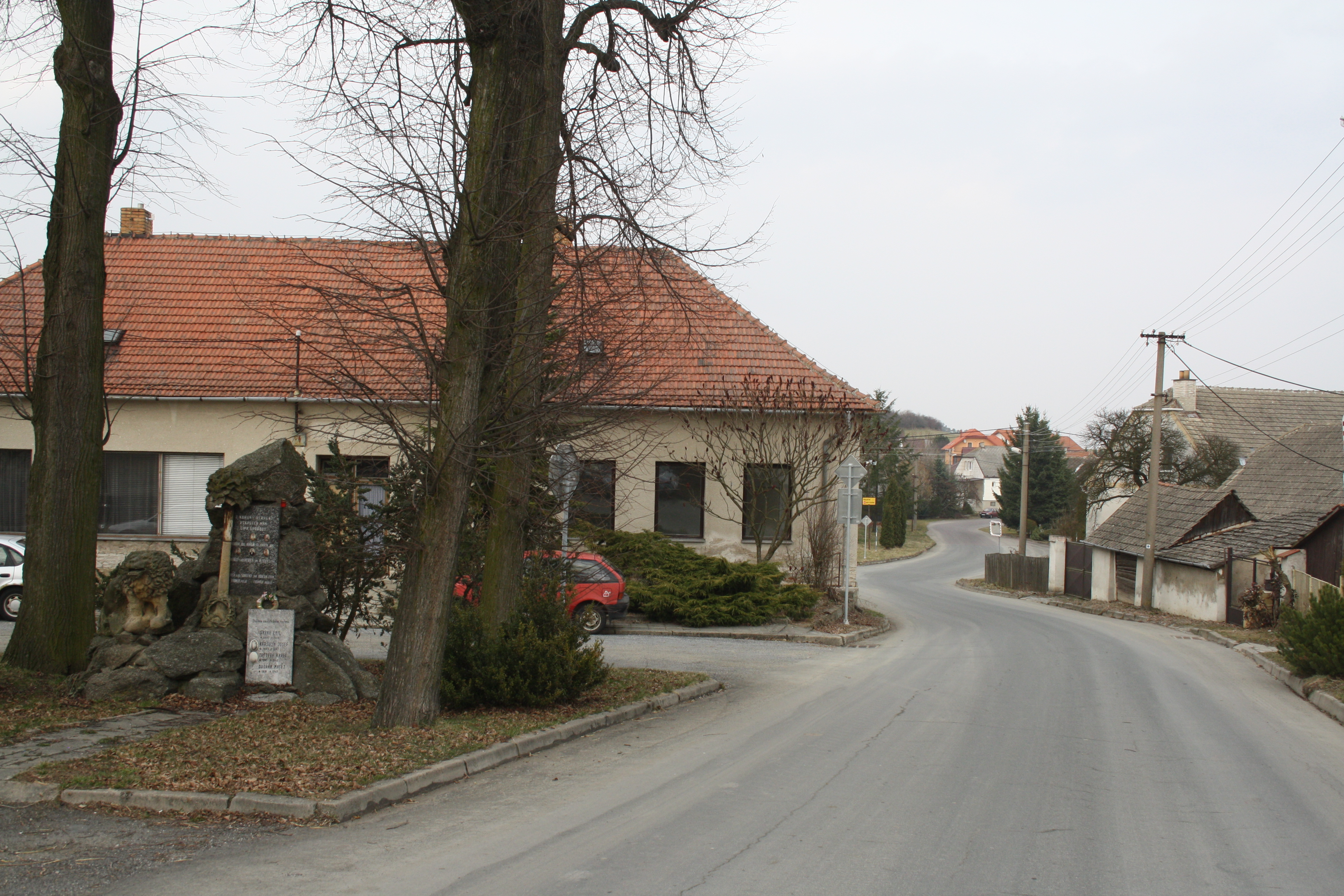
- Centre of Klučov

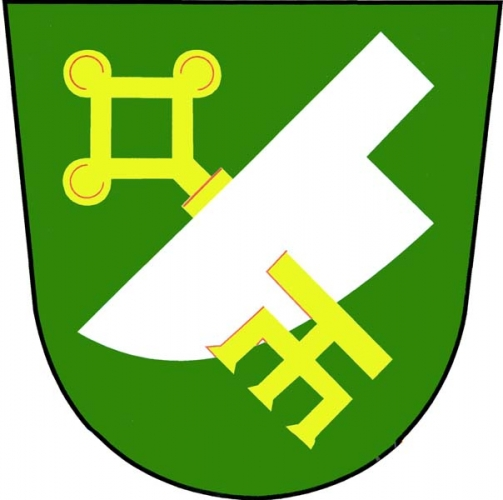
- Flag Coat of arms

- Location in the Czech Republic
- Coordinates: 49°10′1″N 15°56′6″E
- Country: Czech Republic
- Region: Vysočina
- District: Třebíč
- First mentioned: 1351

Area
  - Total: 7.28 km^{2} (2.81 sq mi)
- Elevation: 537 m (1,762 ft)

Population (2026-01-01)
  - Total: 175
  - Density: 24.0/km^{2} (62.3/sq mi)
- Time zone: UTC+1 (CET)
  - Summer (DST): UTC+2 (CEST)
- Postal code: 675 52
- Website: www.obecklucov.cz

Klučov is a municipality and village in Třebíč District in the Vysočina Region of the Czech Republic. It has about 200 inhabitants.

Klučov lies approximately 8 kilometres (5 mi) south-east of Třebíč, 36 km (22 mi) south-east of Jihlava, and 150 km (93 mi) south-east of Prague.

== Demographics ==
Historical population
Year	Pop.	±%
1869	276	—
1880	288	+4.3%
1890	314	+9.0%
1900	374	+19.1%
1910	299	−20.1%
1921	275	−8.0%
1930	248	−9.8%
1950	201	−19.0%
1961	186	−7.5%
1970	174	−6.5%
1980	150	−13.8%
1991	122	−18.7%
2001	135	+10.7%
2011	175	+29.6%
2021	172	−1.7%
Source: Censuses
