= Klučov (Kolín District) =

- Municipality
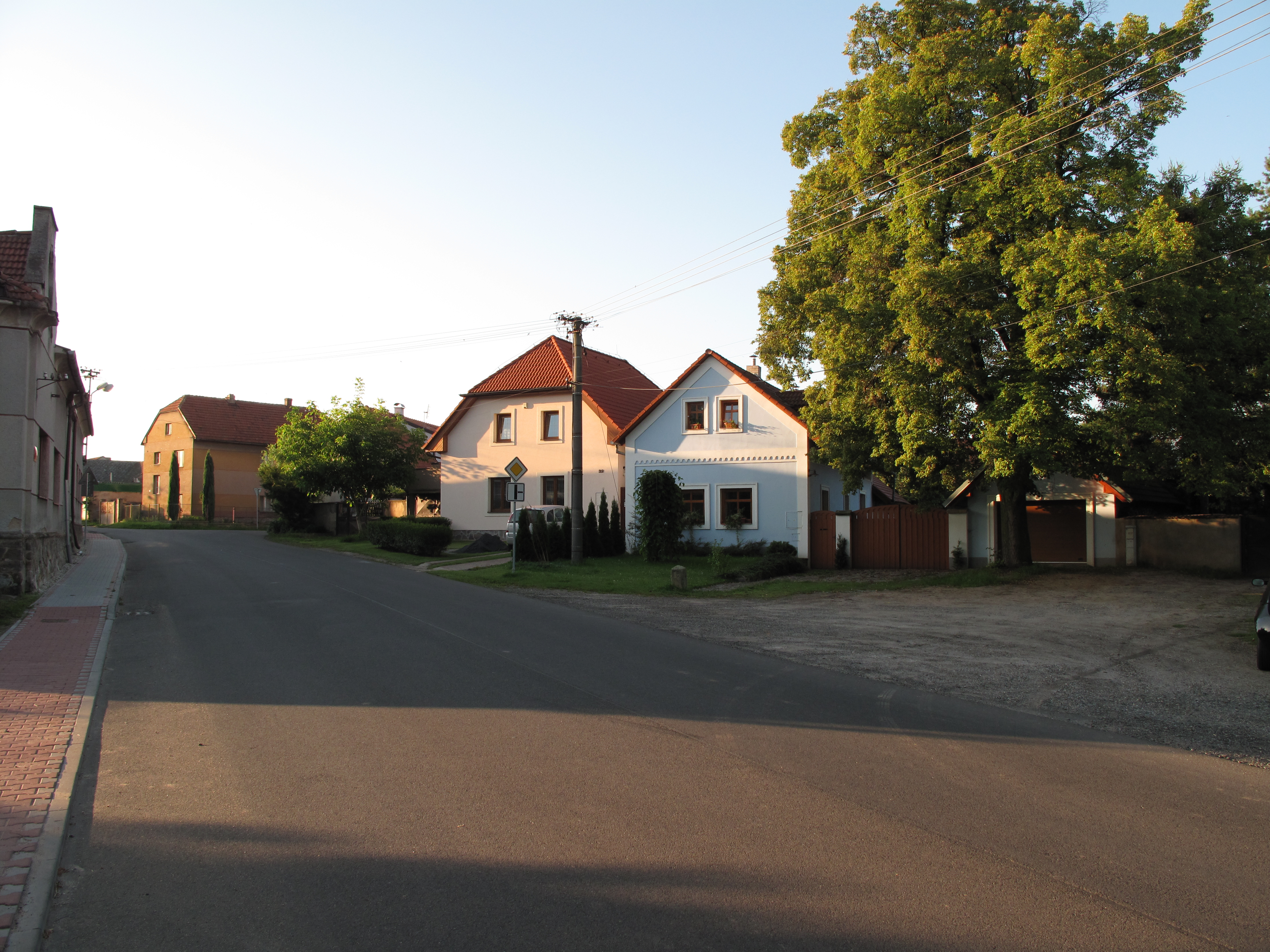
- Centre of Klučov

- Location in the Czech Republic
- Coordinates: 50°5′42″N 14°54′36″E
- Country: Czech Republic
- Region: Central Bohemian
- District: Kolín
- First mentioned: 1250

Area
  - Total: 14.44 km^{2} (5.58 sq mi)
- Elevation: 207 m (679 ft)

Population (2026-01-01)
  - Total: 1,104
  - Density: 76.45/km^{2} (198.0/sq mi)
- Time zone: UTC+1 (CET)
  - Summer (DST): UTC+2 (CEST)
- Postal code: 282 01
- Website: www.klucov.cz

Klučov is a municipality and village in Kolín District in the Central Bohemian Region of the Czech Republic. It has about 1,100 inhabitants.

== Administrative division ==
Klučov consists of four municipal parts (in brackets population according to the 2021 census):

- Klučov (597)
- Lstiboř (248)
- Skramníky (173)
- Žhery (59)

== Etymology ==
The name was probably derived from the Old Czech word klučenina, i.e. 'clearing'.

== Geography ==
Klučov is located about 21 kilometres (13 mi) northwest of Kolín and 27 km (17 mi) east of Prague. It lies in a flat agricultural landscape in the Central Elbe Table. The highest point is at 252 m (827 ft) above sea level. The Šembera River flows through the municipality.

== History ==
The first written mention of Klučov is from 1250. Until 1418, the village was owned by a local noble family that called themselves Lords of Klučov. In the following decades, Klučov was property of various lesser noblemen. Shortly after 1534, Klučov was annexed to the Kostelec estate.

== Demographics ==
Historical population

| Year | Pop. | ±% |
|---|---|---|
| 1869 | 1,166 | — |
| 1880 | 1,206 | +3.4% |
| 1890 | 1,294 | +7.3% |
| 1900 | 1,242 | −4.0% |
| 1910 | 1,248 | +0.5% |

| Year | Pop. | ±% |
|---|---|---|
| 1921 | 1,258 | +0.8% |
| 1930 | 1,456 | +15.7% |
| 1950 | 1,217 | −16.4% |
| 1961 | 1,166 | −4.2% |
| 1970 | 1,132 | −2.9% |

| Year | Pop. | ±% |
|---|---|---|
| 1980 | 1,007 | −11.0% |
| 1991 | 832 | −17.4% |
| 2001 | 808 | −2.9% |
| 2011 | 878 | +8.7% |
| 2021 | 1,077 | +22.7% |

Source: Censuses

== Transport ==
Klučov is located on the railway line Prague–Kolín.

== Sights ==
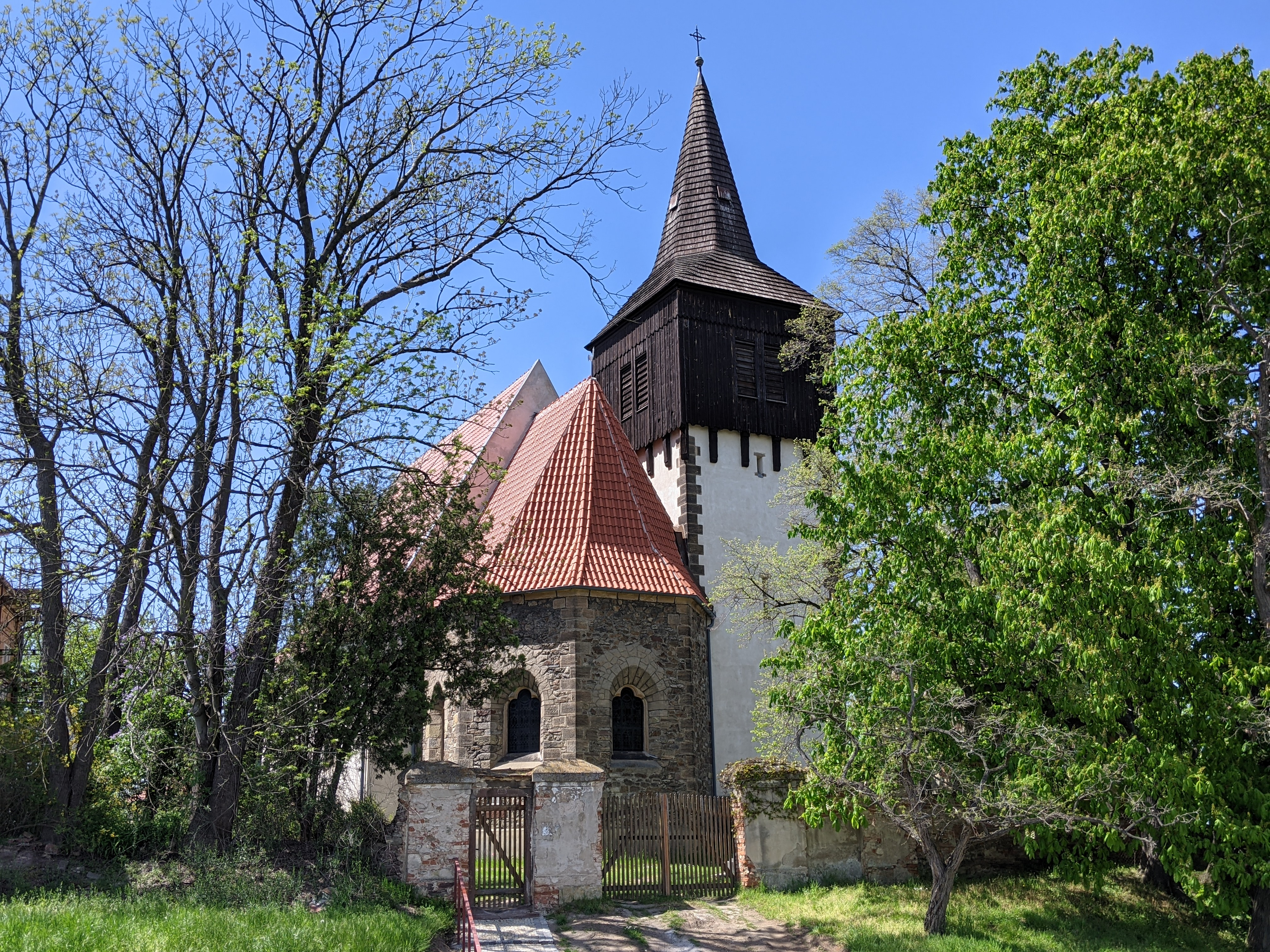
Church of the Beheading of Saint John the Baptist

The Church of the Assumption of the Virgin Mary is located in Lstiboř. It was originally a Gothic church from the mid-14th century. In 1747–1752, it was rebuilt in the Baroque style, but retained the Gothic core.

The Church of the Beheading of Saint John the Baptist is located in Skramníky. It was also built in the Gothic style in the mid-14th century. Next to the church is a Baroque rectory.

== Notable people ==
- Franz Pokorny (1797–1850), Austrian theatre manager
