= Anton Schlossar =

Austrian librarian and writer

Anton Schlossar (27 June 1849 – 1 August 1942) was an Austrian librarian and writer, in particular writing about the Austrian state of Styria.

== Life ==
Schlossar was born in Troppau in Austrian Silesia (now Opava in the Czech Republic), son of a tax official. The family moved to Kronstadt (now Brașov in Romania) where he was educated, and in 1867 to Graz, where he studied law, receiving his degree in 1873. From 1871 he was in court service in Graz, Leoben and Celje.

He did not like working in court, and in 1875 he became an amanuensis, or secretary, at the University of Graz Library. From 1881 he was a scriptor, and from 1904 to 1910 he was a director of the library.

== Literary works ==
Schlossar was interested in the culture and history of Styria, and was particularly interested in Styria at the time of Archduke John of Austria (1782–1859). Works include Erzherzog Johann von Oesterreich und sein Einfluß auf das Culturleben der Steiermark ("Archduke John and his influence of the cultural life of Styria") (1878), for which he received the Goldene Medaille für Kunst und Wissenschaft, and Oesterreichische Cultur- und Literaturbilder mit besonderer Berücksichtigung der Steiermark. ("Sketches of Austrian culture and life, with particular regard to Styria") (1879). He travelled in the area to collect folk songs, preserving the local dialect of the songs in his publications, though less interested in the melodies. He contributed to magazines such as Das literarische Echo in Stuttgart and Bühne und Welt in Berlin.
