= Jan Nepomuk Škroup =

Jan Nepomuk Škroup (15 September 1811, Osice – 5 May 1892, Prague; Czech pronunciation: [ʃkroup]) was a Czech composer, conductor, and choirmaster. His brother František Škroup was also a successful composer, known today as the composer of the Czech national anthem, "Kde domov můj?" ("Where is my home?"). His father, Dominik Škroup, and other brother, Ignác Škroup, were also composers.

== Biography ==
Škroup held positions (as Vice-Kapellmeister, then choirmaster, and then 2nd Kapellmeister) in the Estates Theatre in Prague, from 1836 to 1843, and was also affiliated with the theatre from 1874 to 1882. He held various other choirmaster positions, including one at the Prague Cathedral, from 1843.

Škroup's brother, František, chief conductor at the Estates Theatre starting in 1837, led an attempt to promote Czech-language opera in the mid-nineteenth century. Although only two Czech-language operas were performed at the Estates Theatre between 1834 and 1848, largely due to the lack of suitable Czech-speaking performers, one of those was Jan Nepomuk's Švědové v Praze (The Swedes in Prague, 1845, first act only).

Škroup's first operatic attempt had been in German; Elfriede (completed by 1828), was a three-act work intended for children. He composed Slavná overtura (Festival Overture), for the opening of the Růžová St. Theatre in Prague in 1842. Other works include incidental music to Josef Kajetán Tyl's Chudý kejklíř (The Poor Juggler), songs, and various sacred music in fulfillment of his duties as choirmaster at various locations.

Although Škroup is not well known for his compositional output, he had several brushes with fame as a result of his professional work. He was one of Hector Berlioz’s hosts during the French composer’s visits to Prague in 1846. In January and April of that year, Berlioz gave a total of six concerts; Berlioz mentioned Škroup (spelled “Scraup”) in a letter about preparations for his second stay in Prague. Additionally, Franz Liszt’s 1856 performance of his Missa solemnis at the Prague Cathedral occurred during Škroup’s tenure there.

== Works ==
- Elfriede, Kinderoper 3 Akte, (by 1828)
- Slavná overtura (Festival Overture), (1842)
- Švědové v Praze (The Swedes in Prague), (1845)
- Incidental music to Josef Kajetán Tyl's Chudý kejklíř (The Poor Juggler), (date?)

For additional works, see Franz Pazdírek's entry, "Skraup, Joh. Nepomuk," in his Universal-Handbuch der Musikliteratur.

== Sources ==
- Pazdírek, Franz. "Skraup, Joh. Nepomuk," Universal-Handbuch der Musikliteratur, vol. XI (p. 26). Hilversum: Frits Knuf, 1967.
- Sadie, Stanley, ed. "Škroup, Jan Nepomuk," The New Grove Dictionary of Music and Musicians, vol. 23 (p. 482). London: Macmillan, 2001.
- Tayeb, Monir, and Michel Austin. The Hector Berlioz Website, Berlioz in Germany (and Central Europe): Prague
- Tyrrell, John. Czech Opera. Cambridge: Cambridge University Press, 1988.
