= Franz Pokorny =

Austrian theatre manager (1797–1850)

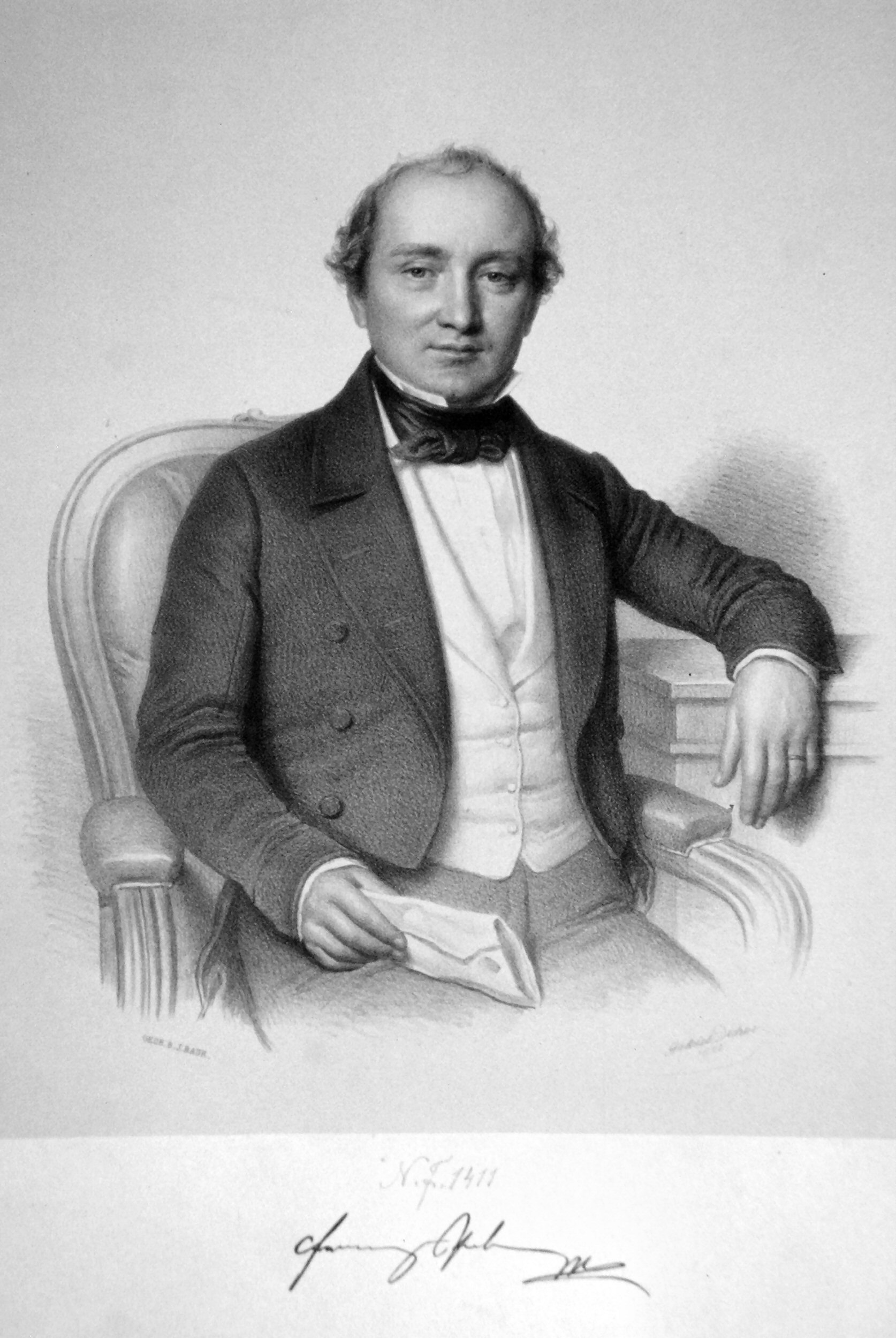
Lithograph by Gabriel Decker

Franz Pokorny (22 December 1797 – 5 August 1850) was an Austrian theatre manager. He owned two leading theatres in Vienna, the Theater in der Josefstadt and the Theater an der Wien, where he staged notable productions.

== Life ==
=== Early career ===
Pokorny was born in Lstiboř, Bohemia (now part of Klučov, Czech Republic), son of a teacher. He was initially a school assistant. In 1819, he moved to Vienna, where he was a clarinettist at the Theater in der Josefstadt. In 1822 he was a clarinettist at the civic theatre in Pressburg (now Bratislava in Slovakia), where from 1827 he directed the theatre orchestra.

=== Theater in der Josefstadt ===
In 1835 Pokorny leased the civic theatre of Pressburg, and successfully staged operas. In 1836 he also leased the civic theatre of Baden bei Wien, and in 1837 the Theater in der Josefstadt in Vienna, buying this theatre in 1840. Productions staged at the Theater in der Josefstadt included the Vienna premieres of Meyerbeer's opera Les Huguenots (1839), and of Donizetti's operas Lucia di Lammermoor (1843) and La fille du régiment (1844). He also staged in his theatres classic dramas and Possen mit Gesang; Der Zauberschleier by Franz Xaver Told was successful.

=== Theater an der Wien ===
In 1841 he bought the civic theatre in Ödenburg (now Sopron in Hungary). He gave up the management of the theatre in Baden in 1843 and that of Pressburg in 1844, and in 1845 bought the Theater an der Wien in Vienna: Pokorny became dominant in the theatrical life of Vienna. He refurbished the theatre, and put on polished productions, so that the theatre competed with the Vienna Court Opera (which he unsuccessfully tried to lease). Conductors of the orchestra of the Theater an der Wien during this period included Franz von Suppé and Albert Lortzing, and productions included the Vienna premieres of Lortzing's opera Undine and of Meyerbeer's opera Vielka (both 1847). In 1846 and 1847 Jenny Lind was a guest performer.

=== Last years ===
His health declined; the high cost of his productions, the revolutionary events of 1848, and his generosity in donating to Viennese charities, increased his indebtedness. 1848 he leased the Theater in der Josefstadt.

He died in Vienna in 1850. His son Alois Pokorny (1825–1883) continued to run the Theater an der Wien until 1862, when it was leased by Friedrich Strampfer, but remained the owner until 1873.
