= Max Büdinger =

German historian (1828–1902)

- Born: 1 April 1828; Kassel, Hesse, Germany
- Died: 22 February 1902 (aged 73); Vienna, Austria
- Occupation: Historian

Max Büdinger (1 April 1828, Kassel, Germany – 22 February 1902, Vienna, Austria) was a German historian. He was a professor of general history at the University of Vienna (1872–99).

== Bibliography ==
- Die Universalhistorie Im Altertume (1895)
