= Karl Meisl =

Naval accountant and dramatist

Karl Meisl, or Carl Meisl (30 June 1775 – 8 October 1853) was an accountant in the Imperial Austrian Navy, and a dramatist.

== Life ==
Meisl was born in Ljubljana (at that time in the Hapsburg Monarchy) in 1775, and was educated there. In 1800 he was appointed Fourier (a military officer rank); he was promoted to accounting officer and field warfare commissioner, and moved to Vienna. He rose to become accounting adviser in the naval department of the Hofkriegsrat. He retired in 1840; he died in Vienna in 1853 and was buried in Schmelzer Cemetery.

=== Dramatic works ===
He wrote about 200 pieces for the stage. His first play, Carolo Carolina, appeared in 1802, and his last, Die blonden Locken, in 1844. Together with the dramatists Josef Alois Gleich (1772–1841) and Adolf Bäuerle (1786–1859), he was important during a period in Old Viennese folk theatre, after the earlier Hanswurst-theatre and before the folk theatre of Ferdinand Raimund and Johann Nestroy. His plays were mostly performed in the Theater in der Leopoldstadt in Vienna; leading roles were played by Ferdinand Raimund, Ignaz Schuster, Friedrich Josef Korntheuer, Carl Carl, Johann Nestroy and Wenzel Scholz.

=== The Consecration of the House ===
Meisl wrote the text of the cantata Die Weihe des Hauses (The Consecration of the House), for which Ludwig van Beethoven wrote the overture; it was written to celebrate the re-opening in October 1822 of the Theater in der Josefstadt in Vienna, rebuilt by Karl Friedrich Hensler.
