= Servite Church, Vienna =

Church in Vienna, Austria

Coordinates: 48°13′14″N 16°21′50″E

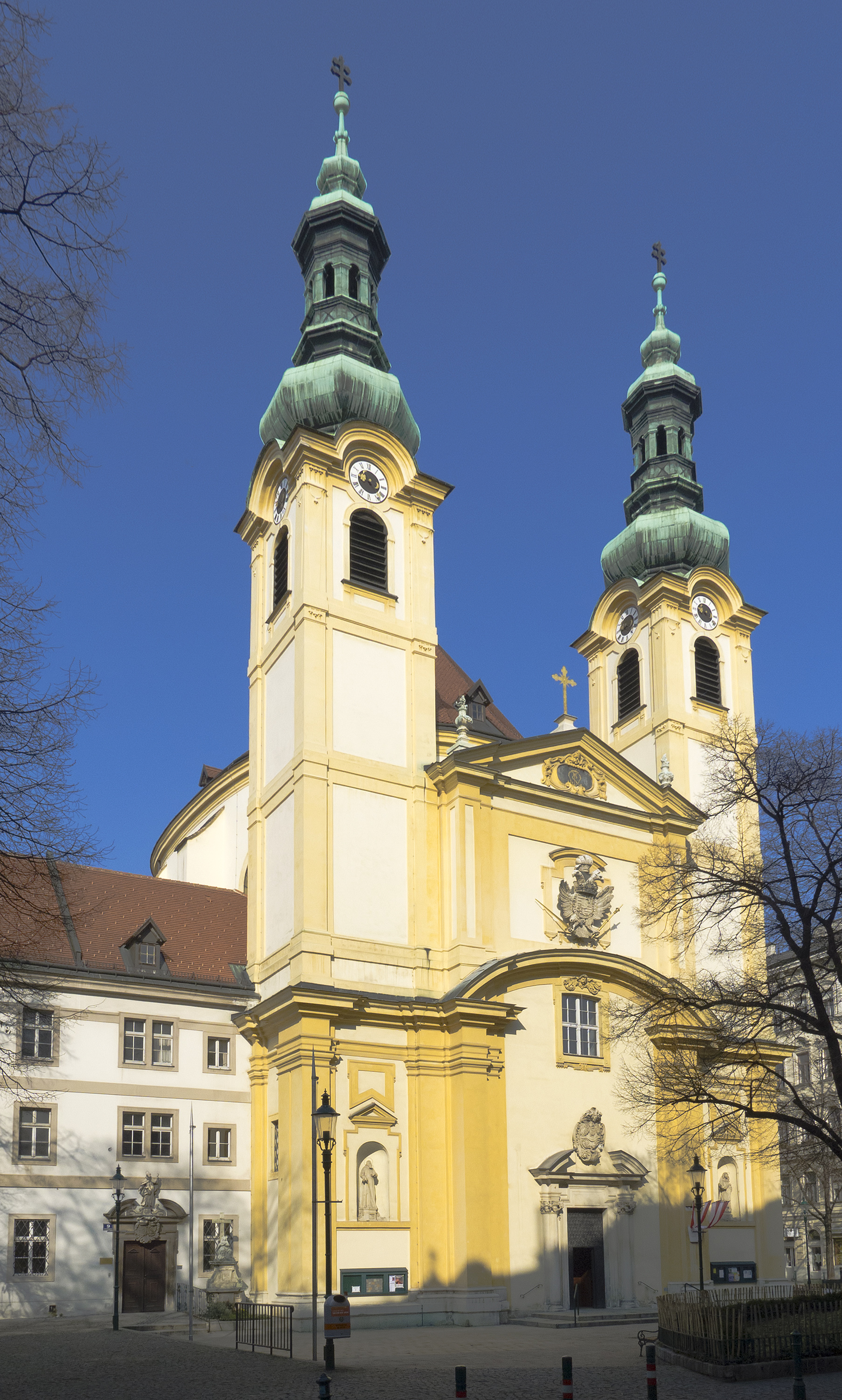
Servite Church in Vienna

The Servite Church (German: Servitenkirche) is a church in Vienna, Austria.

== History ==
On September 16, 1638, Emperor Ferdinand III allowed the Servite Order to found a monastery in Vienna.

Inspired by Italian architect Andrea Palladio, the church of the Servites was built by Martin Carlone and dedicated to the Annunciation to the Virgin. The foundation stone was laid on November 11, 1651, and the church was consecrated in 1670 though the interior decoration was completed later.

The most important work of art in the church is the "Pietà" at the altar of Our Lady of Sorrows. The tomb of general Ottavio Piccolomini, who was an active patron of the church, is located under this altar. Another patron of the church was Baron Christoph Ignaz Abele who donated the "Liborius altar".
