= Josef Alois Gleich =

Josef Alois Gleich (also Joseph Alois Gleich; pseudonyms Adolph Blum, Ludwig Dellarosa, Heinrich Walden; 14 September 1772 – 10 February 1841) was an Austrian civil servant, and a prolific dramatist and novelist.

== Life ==
Gleich was born in Vienna in 1772, son of a clerk. At the University of Vienna he studied philosophy, languages and public accounting, and entered the civil service. From 1790 to 1831 he was employed in provincial accounting of Lower Austria.

=== Plays ===
From 1791 he was active in Vienna as a writer. He was a dramatist, and wrote about 220 plays from 1804 to 1833; they were staged at the Theater in der Josefstadt, where he was assistant director from 1814 to 1816, and at the Theater in der Leopoldstadt. Like his contemporaries Karl Meisl and Adolf Bäuerle, his plays developed the tradition of Old Viennese folk theatre.

The actor and dramatist Ferdinand Raimund's first acting success was in Gleich's play Die Musikanten am Hohen Markt, and Gleich wrote further plays for him. Raimund, who became Gleich's son-in-law, continued the development of Viennese folk theatre.

=== Novels and periodical ===
Gleich also wrote about 100 popular novels about knights, robbers and ghosts, modelled on the stories of Christian Heinrich Spiess.

In 1832 he founded a periodical for popular consumption, the "Comic letters of Hansjörgel von Gumpoldskirchen to his brother-in-law Maxel in Feselau with his accounts of daily events in Vienna". They were in the style of the Eipeldauer-Briefe of Joseph Richter. He continued to produce it until his death in 1841.
