= Wiener Theaterzeitung =

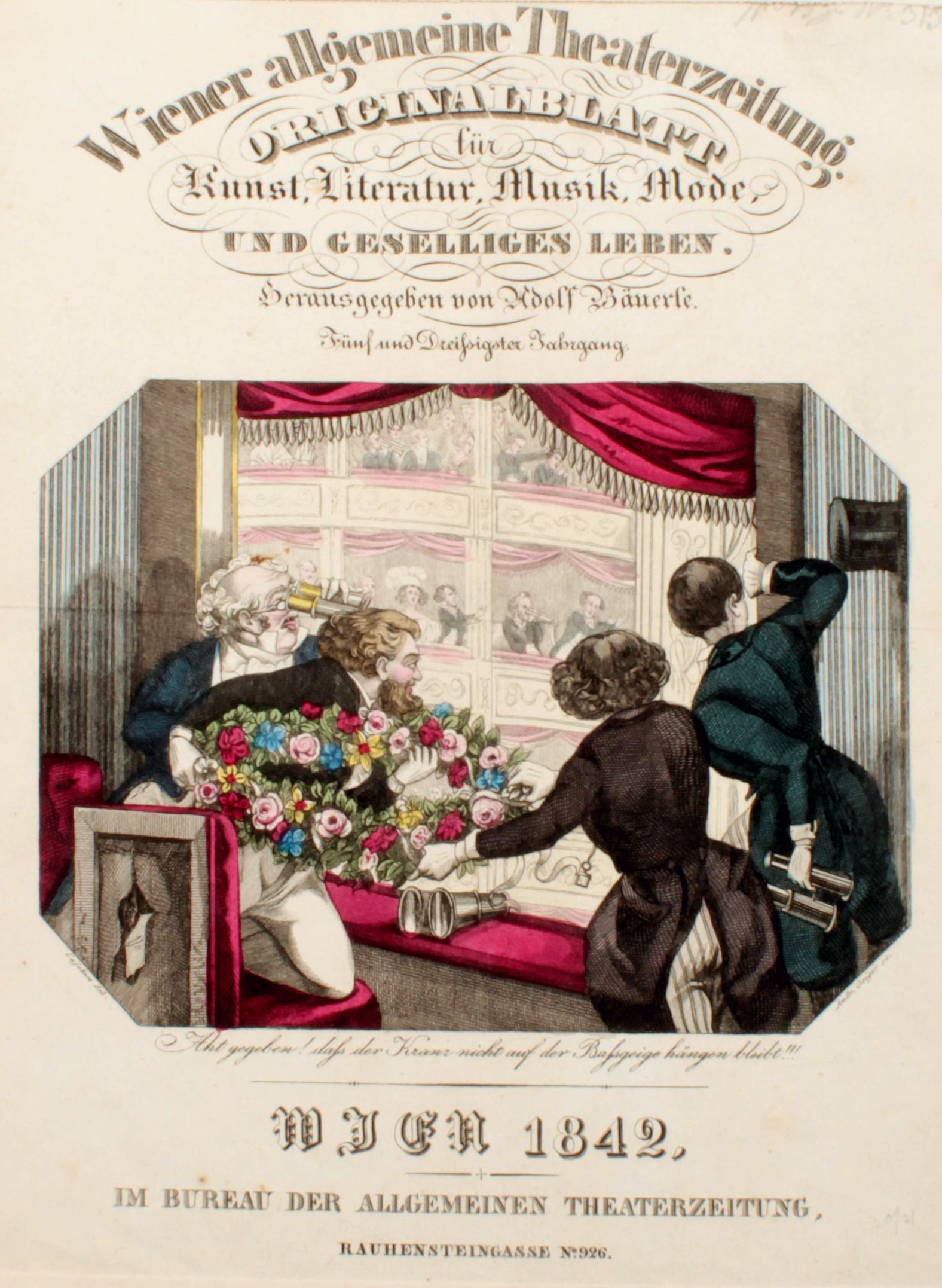
Wiener Theaterzeitung

Wiener Theater Zeitung (also Bäuerles Theaterzeitung, Wiener allgemeine Theaterzeitung) was an Austrian journal founded by Adolf Bäuerle. It was published from 1806 to 1860 in Vienna. The first issue appeared on 1 July 1806. It covered arts, literature, music and social life. The magazine had a circulation of 5,000 to 6,000 copies.
