= Der Humorist =

Austrian satirical magazine

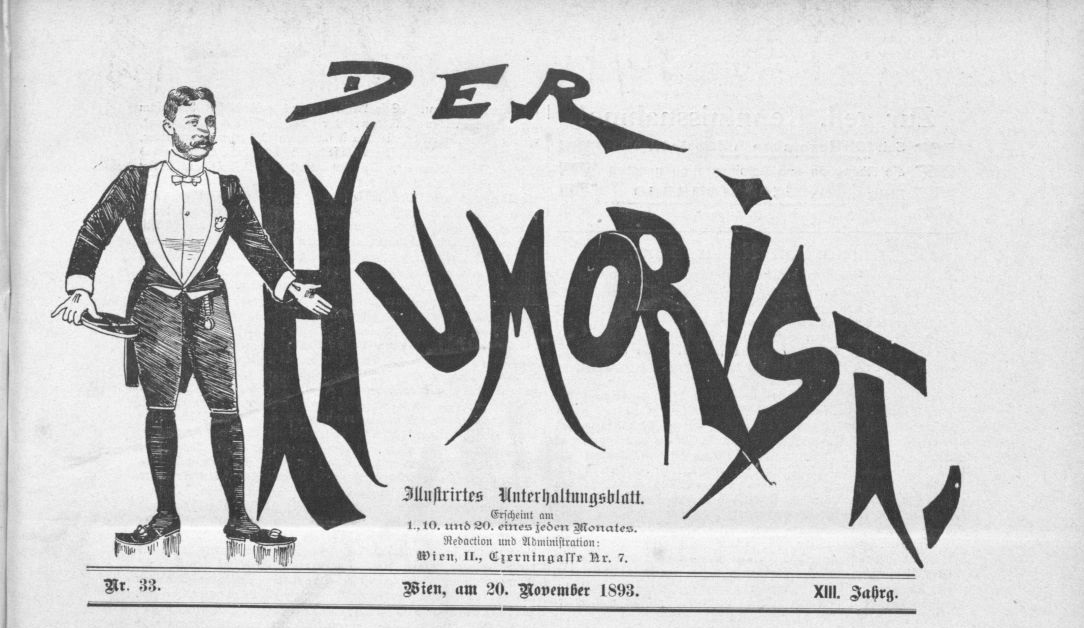
Der Humorist (1893)

Der Humorist was a journal published from 1837 to 1926 with the title "eine Zeitschrift für Scherz und Ernst, Kunst, Theater, Geselligkeit und Sitte" (a journal for jokes and seriousness, art, theatre, sociability and custom). In the years 1837 to 1848, Der Humorist was published without any further addition. Afterwards with "ein Volksblatt für alle Interessen des Rechts und des Lichts, für Leben und Kunst, für Ernst, Scherz und Satyre, nebst bildlichen, satyrischen Beilagen unter dem Titel: Karikaturen-Album" (a popular magazine for all interests of law and light, for life and art, for seriousness, jest and satyrs, together with pictorial, satyric supplements under the title: Caricature Album").

The magazine, which was published in Vienna, initially appeared four times a week, from October 1858 five times a week and from 1844 every working day. From April to November 1859, the magazine was published only twice a week, then only once a week. The Humorist did not appear from 12 September to 1 December 1851 and the Monday edition from January to March 1859. From November 1859 to 1861, the periodical appeared only as a Monday paper.
