= Ferdinand Raimund =

Austrian actor and dramatist (1790–1836)

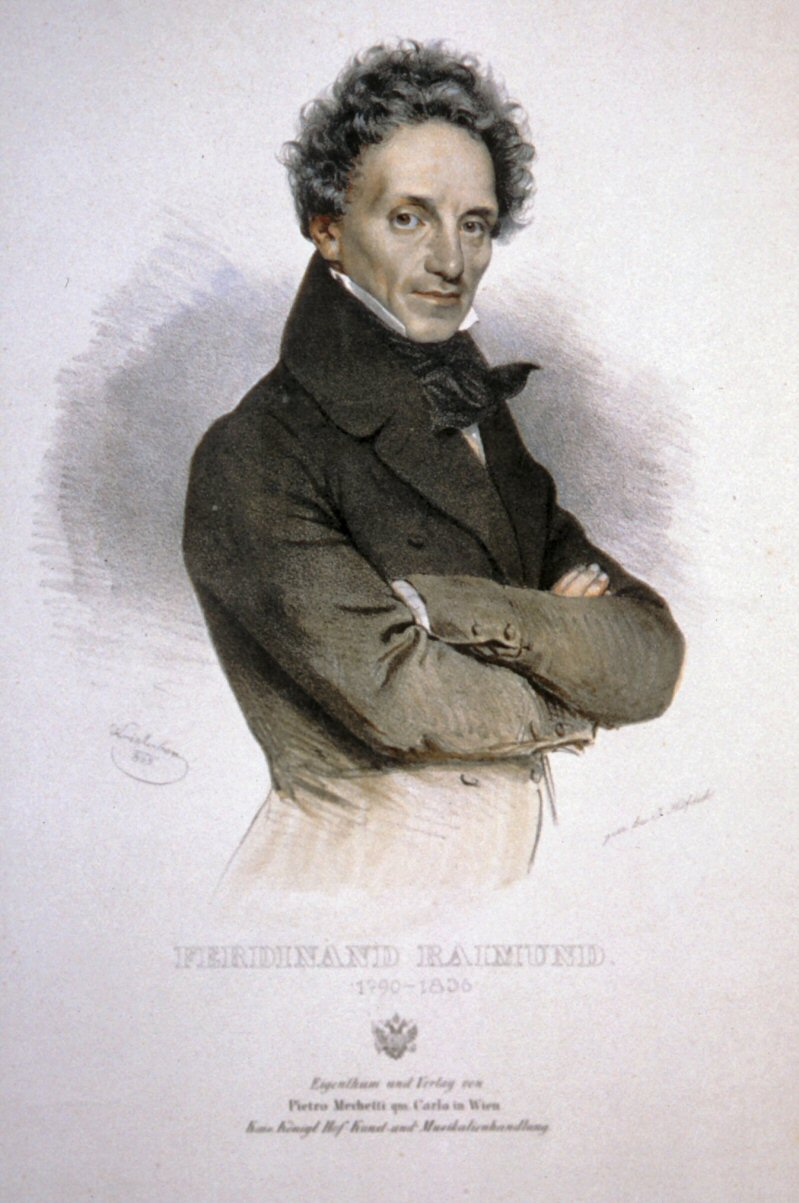
Ferdinand Raimund, lithography by Josef Kriehuber, 1835

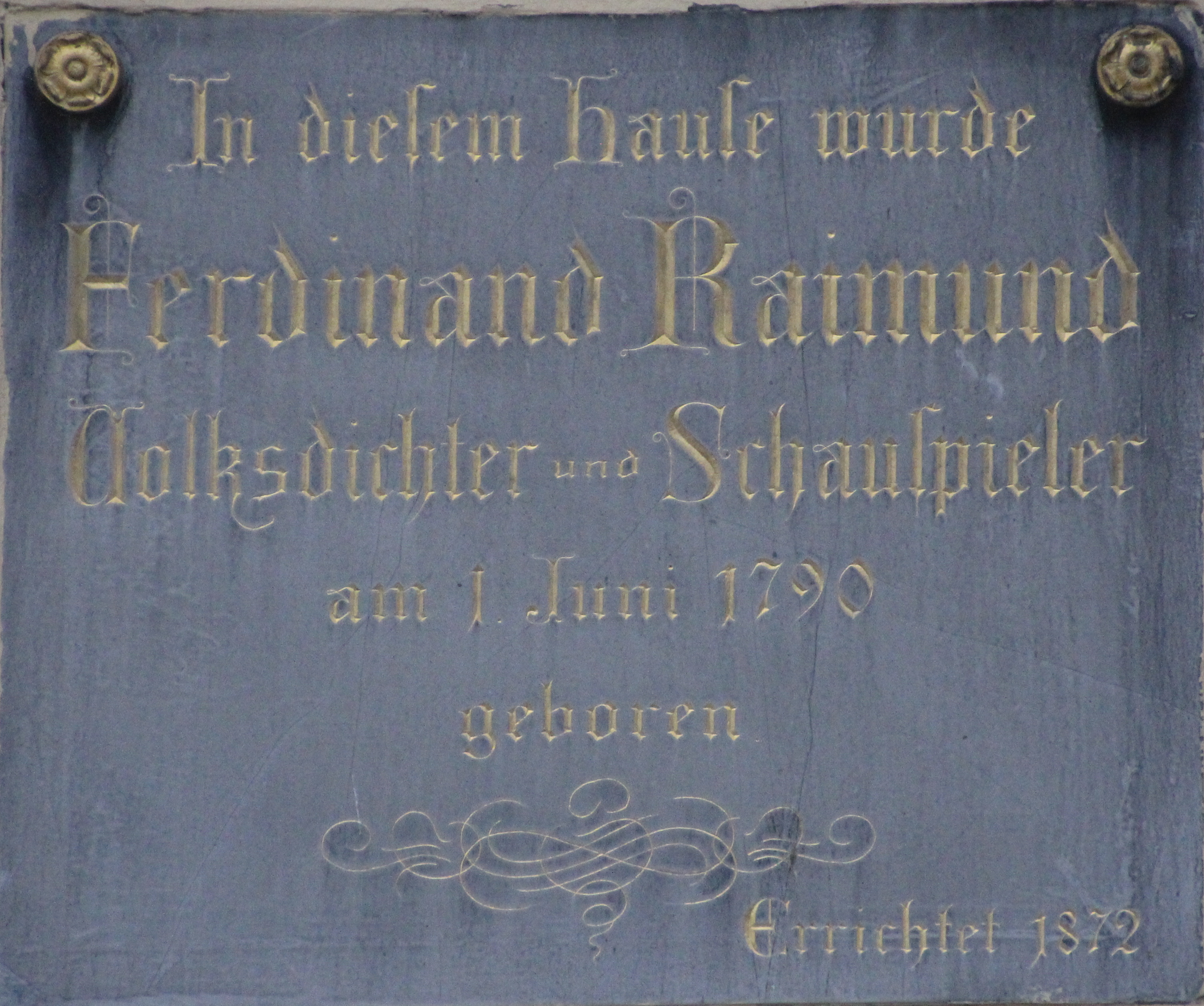
Commemorative plaque at the birthplace of Ferdinand Raimund, Mariahilferstrasse 45, 1060 Wien

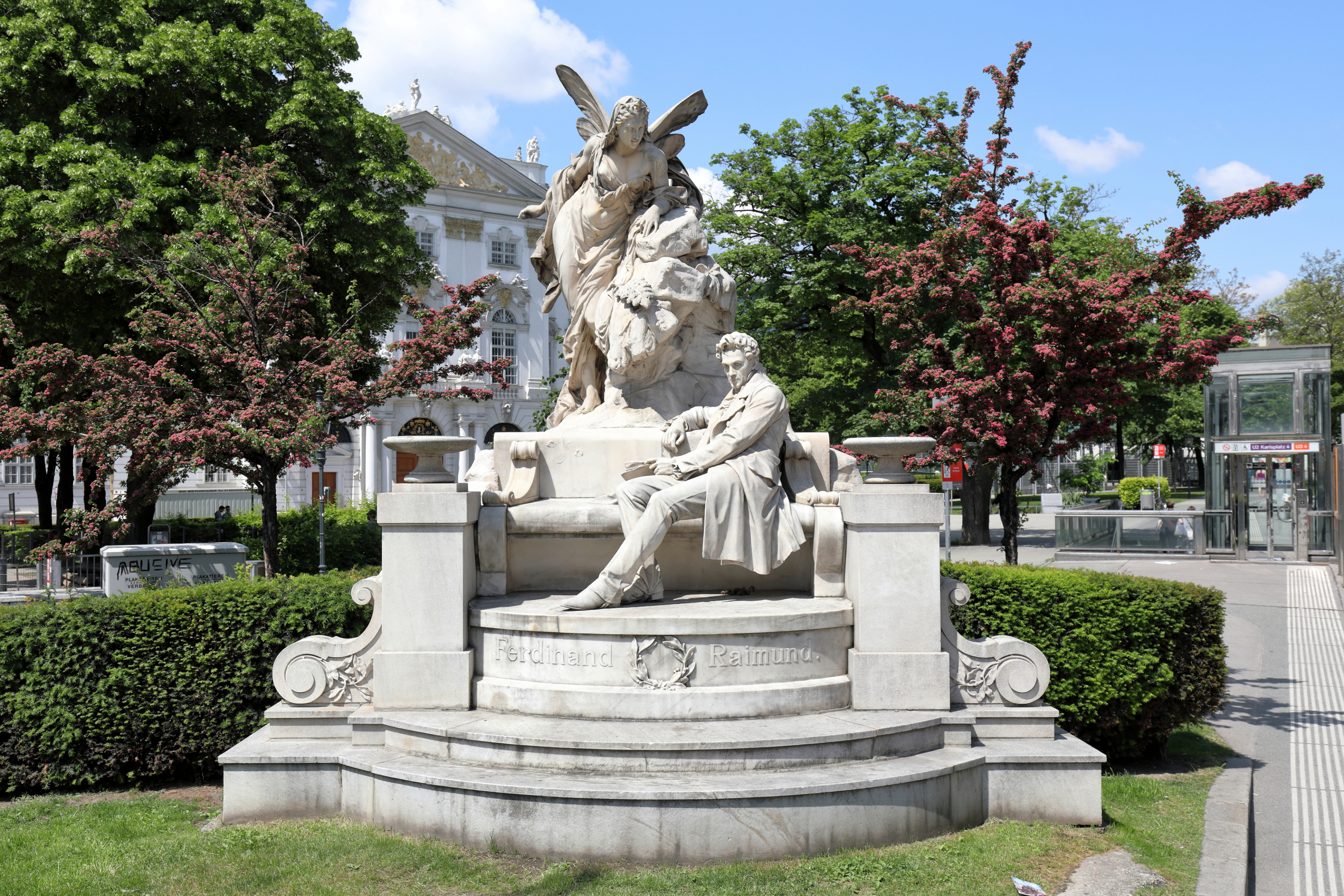
Ferdinand Raimund monument, Vienna

Ferdinand Raimund (born Ferdinand Jakob Raimann; 1 June 1790 – 5 September 1836, Pottenstein, Lower Austria) was an Austrian actor and playwright.

== Life and work ==
Raimund was born in Vienna as a son of Bohemian woodturning master craftsman Jakob Raimann. In 1811, he acted at the Theater in der Josefstadt, and, in 1817 at the Leopoldstädter Theater. In 1823 he produced his first play, Der Barometermacher auf der Zauberinsel, which was followed by Der Diamant des Geisterkönigs (1824). The still popular Bauer als Millionär (1826), Der Alpenkönig und der Menschenfeind (1828) and Der Verschwender (1834), incidental music by Conradin Kreutzer, are Raimund's masterpieces. Raimund's comedies are still frequently performed in Germany and Austria.

When Raimund was bitten by a dog, which he falsely believed to be rabid, he shot himself on 29 August 1836 and died on 5 September 1836 in Pottenstein, aged 46. Raimund is buried in Gutenstein, which features a Raimund memorial.

Raimund was a master of the Viennese Posse or farce; his rich humour is seen to best advantage in his realistic portraits of his fellow citizens. The Raimund Theater in Vienna is named after him.

== Works ==
- Der Barometermacher auf der Zauberinsel, 1823 (The Barometer-Maker on the Magic Island translated by Edmund Kimbell)
- Der Diamant des Geisterkönigs, 1824 (The Diamond of the Spirit King translated by Edmund Kimbell)
- Das Mädchen aus der Feenwelt oder Der Bauer als Millionär, 1826
- Die gefesselte Phantasie, 1828
- Moisasurs Zauberfluch, 1827
- Der Alpenkönig und der Menschenfeind, 1828 (The King of the Alps translated by John Baldwin Buckstone Free full text online)
- Die unheilbringende Zauberkrone oder König ohne Reich, Held ohne Mut, Schönheit ohne Jugend, 1829
- Der Verschwender, 1834 (The Spendthrift translated by Erwin Tramer), adapted as film The Spendthrift (1953)

== See also ==
- List of Austrian writers

== Bibliography ==
- Ferdinand Raimunds sämmtliche Werke (with biography by Johann Nepomuk Vogl) appeared in 4 volumes. (1837); they have been also edited by K. Glossy and A. Sauer (4 vols., 1881; 2nd ed., 1891), and a selection by E. Castle (1903). See E. Schmidt in Charakteristiken, vol. I. (1886); A. Farinelli, Grillparzer und Raimund (1897); L. A. Frankl, Zur Biographie F. Raimunds (1884); and especially A. Sauer's article in the Allgemeine Deutsche Biographie.
