= Theater in der Leopoldstadt =

Coordinates: 48°12′54″N 16°23′04″E

Theater in der Leopoldstadt,1820s

The Theater in der Leopoldstadt (also: Leopoldstädter Theater) was an opera house in the Leopoldstadt district of Vienna, founded in 1781 by Karl von Marinelli, following the Schauspielfreiheit (ending of the court's monopoly on entertainment) by Joseph II in 1776. The 19th-century summer stage called the Thaliatheater was also managed by the Leopoldstadt.

In its early years, the theatre staged Singspiele and Possen mit Gesang, notably by the theatre's Kapellmeister Wenzel Müller and his assistant Ferdinand Kauer. The dramatist Ferdinand Raimund worked with the theatre in the 1820s.

The theatre was eventually demolished and rebuilt in 1847, under the name of the Carltheater.

== Premieres ==
- 1784: Der Streit zwischen dem Zauberer Scionco und der Fee Galantina, oder Kasperl bleibt Kasperl, comedy with machines and music by Ferdinand Kauer
- 1784: Harlekin auf dem Parade Beth, große Pantomime by Wenzel Müller
- 1790: Das Sonnenfest der Braminen heroisch-komisches Singspiel by Müller
- 1791: Kaspar der Fagottist oder Die Zauberzither, Singspiel by Müller
- 1793: Das neue Sonntagskind Singspiel by Müller
- 1794: Die Schwestern von Prag, Singspiel by Müller
- 1797: Das lustige Beylager, Singspiel by Müller
- 1798: Das Donauweibchen, romantisch-komisches Volksmärchen by Kauer
- 1799: Die Teufels Mühle am Wienerberg, Schauspiel mit Gesang by Müller
- 1804: Die Belagerung von Ypsilon, Karikaturoperette by Müller
- 1807: Javima, Oper by Müller
- 1808: Samson, Melodram by Müller
- 1809: Simon Plattkopf, der Unsichtbare, Singspiel by Müller
- 1816: Der Fiaker al Marquis, komische Oper by Müller
- 1822: Aline oder Wien in einem andern Welttheil Zauberoper by Müller
- 1823: Der Barometermacher auf der Zauberinsel Zauberposse by Müller to a text by Ferdinand Raimund
- 1825: Der schwarze See, Zauberspiel (posse)
- 1826: Herr Josef und Frau Baberl, Posse by Müller
- 1828: Die gefesselte Phantasie, Zauberspiel (Posse) by Müller to a text by Raimund
- 1828: Der Alpenkönig und der Menschenfeind, romantisch-komisches Zauberspiel (Posse) by Müller to a text by Raimund

== Bibliography ==
- Grund, H.: Das Leopoldstädter "Kasperltheater" 1781 bis 1831. Vienna, University, Dissertation, 1921
- Hadamowsky, Franz: Das Theater in der Leopoldstadt von 1781 bis 1860. Vienna : Höfel, 1934
