= Adele Spitzeder =

German actress, folk singer, and con artist (1832–1895)

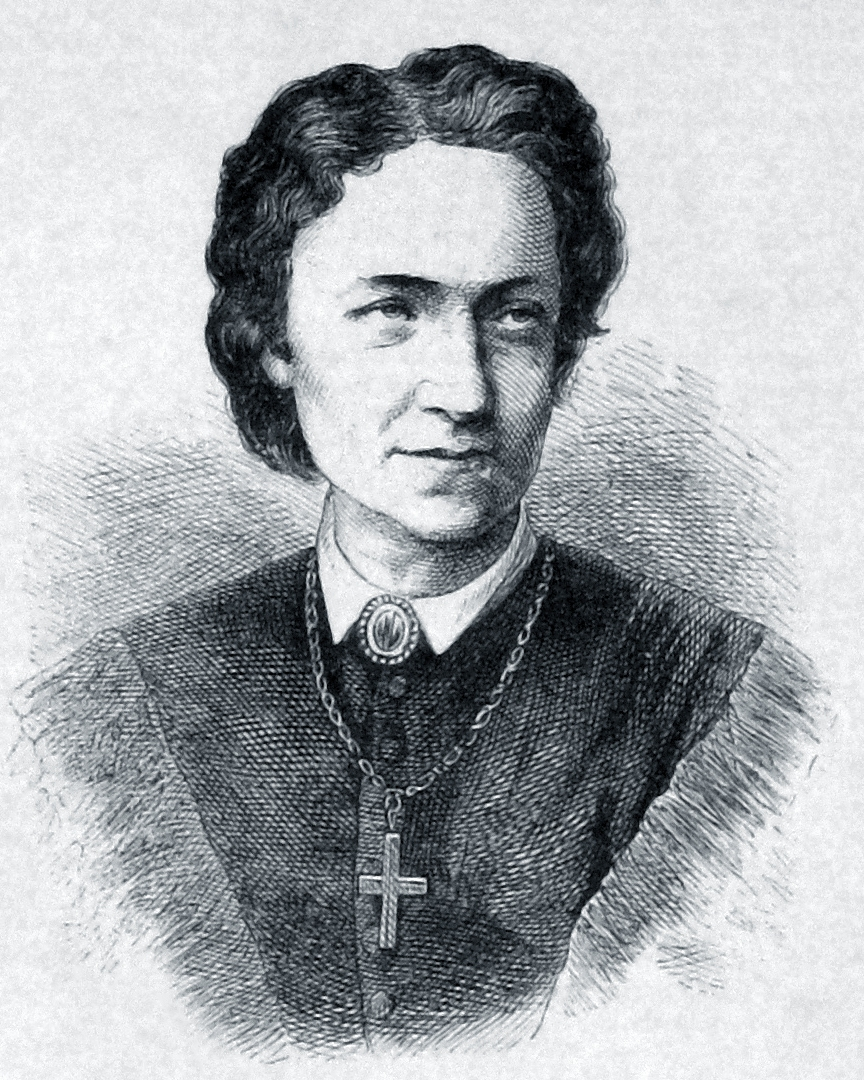
- Drawing of Spitzeder from the 1873 magazine Die Gartenlaube, based on a photograph
- Born: Adelheid Luise Spitzeder; 9 February 1832; Berlin, Kingdom of Prussia
- Died: 27 or 28 October 1895 (aged 63); Munich, Kingdom of Bavaria, German Empire
- Resting place: Alter Südfriedhof, Munich; 48.1275°N 11.5643°E
- Other name: Adele Vio
- Occupations: Singer, actress, private banker
- Years active: 1856–1895
- Known for: Introducing the first Ponzi scheme

Adelheid Luise "Adele" Spitzeder ([ˈaːdl̩haɪt ʔaˈdeːlə ˈʃpɪtˌtseːdɐ]; 9 February 1832 – 27 or 28 October 1895), also known by her stage name Adele Vio, was a German actress, folk singer, and con artist. Initially a promising young actress, Spitzeder became a well-known private banker in 19th-century Munich when her theatrical success dwindled. Running what was possibly the first recorded Ponzi scheme, she offered large returns on investments by continually using the money of new investors to pay back the previous ones. At the height of her success, contemporary sources considered her the wealthiest woman in Bavaria.

Opening her bank in 1869, Spitzeder managed to fend off attempts to discredit her for a few years before authorities were able to bring her to trial in 1872. Because Ponzi schemes were not yet illegal, she was convicted instead of bad accounting and mishandling customers' money and sentenced to three years in prison. Her bank was closed and 32,000 people lost 38 million gulden, the equivalent of almost 400 million euros in 2017 money, causing a wave of suicides. Her personal fortune in art and cash was stripped from her.

After her release from prison in 1876, Spitzeder lived off benefactors and unsuccessfully tried to act again in Altona and Berlin. She left Germany for Vienna but police there prevented her engagement, so she returned to Munich in 1878 to publish her memoir. She was arrested again in 1880 for attempting to open a new bank without having the necessary permits but later released without charges. Spitzeder performed as a folk singer, living off friends and benefactors, but she never left her criminal life completely behind her, resulting in further trials and periods of incarceration. She died of cardiac arrest on 27 or 28 October 1895 in Munich.

Spitzeder never married, but she carried on several lesbian relationships. Outwardly, she maintained the persona of a pious Christian woman who helped the poor, which aided the success of her business.

== Early life ==
Adelheid Luise Spitzeder was born on 9 February 1832 in Berlin. Her parents were the actors and singers Josef Spitzeder and Elisabeth "Betty" Spitzeder-Vio. She had six half-siblings from her father's first marriage to Henriette Schüler. Her parents met in Berlin where both were engaged at the Königsstädtisches Theater, Josef as a director and Betty as an actress; they married in 1831. That year, he performed as a guest at the National Theater in Munich to critical acclaim. King Ludwig I offered him and his wife an annual salary of 6,000 gulden if they took a permanent engagement at the National Theater, which led to the family moving to Munich. When Josef Spitzeder died suddenly on 13 December 1832, Ludwig I agreed to help Betty by paying for the children's tuition. Betty then married Franz Maurer and took an engagement at the Carltheater in Vienna in 1840, where Spitzeder attended a Höhere Mädchenschule run by the order of the Ursulines; after a year, she entered the convent's boarding school. In 1844, she and her mother moved back to Munich, where the family lived with Spitzeder's half-siblings and cousins. At age 16, she went to a renowned school led by Madame Tanche. After leaving Tanche's school, she was tutored in foreign languages, composing and piano-playing.

=== Acting career ===
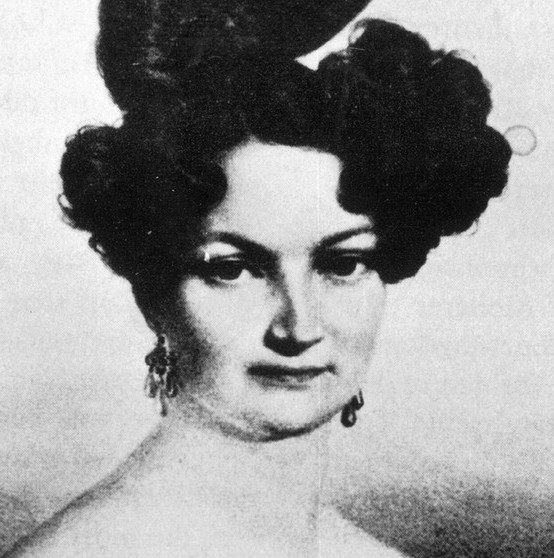
Spitzeder as a young actress (c. 1852)

Wanting to follow in her parents' footsteps and against her mother's wishes, Spitzeder studied with Munich actresses Konstanze Dahn and Charlotte von Hagn. In 1856 or 1857, she debuted at the Hofbühne in Coburg to great acclaim playing Deborah and Mary Stuart. In her memoirs, she claims that the Duke of Coburg and the Duke of Württemberg both praised her talent. Since there were no vacancies at Coburg, she left the Hofbühne to take an engagement at Mannheim before returning to Munich for a few guest roles at the National Theatre. Despite being offered a contract to play there, she knew that she would only be tasked with playing supporting roles due to fierce competition and thus decided to instead work at the theater of Brno. According to her autobiography, her success there led to conflicts with the other actors which in turn led her to leave the engagement after six months for health reasons. She then returned to Munich for six months to recuperate. Despite her mother's urging, she returned to acting at Nuremberg where she was engaged for a year. Afterwards, she played in Frankfurt, Bern, Zürich, Mainz and Karlsruhe. After returning to Munich to visit her mother, she was offered an acting job in Pest with annual salary of 3,000 gulden which she turned down at her mother's wishes. Her mother offered her 50 gulden per month for life if she turned the job down. Nevertheless, she took one last engagement in Altona. During one of her engagements, she met Emilie Stier, stage name Branizka, a fellow actress with whom she soon began a romantic relationship.

Despite multiple engagements over a period of many years, she failed to achieve lasting success on the stage. The contemporary source Der Neue Pitaval attested that she had the necessary talent but attributed her lack of success to her appearance. In his biography of Spitzeder, Julian Nebel cites a contemporary describing her as having a "not very beautiful, square face with rough traits, out of which a long, broad nose protrudes; the mouth is broad, the chin pointy, the gray eyes hard to read, a real butch". Her "masculine" behavior is generally highlighted, such as her cigar smoking and surrounding herself with beautiful young women.

Unable to restrict her lifestyle, she began to live at the expense of her creditors and accrued significant debt in Hamburg and Zurich while working there. In 1868, she returned to Munich with her girlfriend Emilie to await job offers from theatrical agents but did not receive any she wanted. Dejected and penniless, she only had her mother's stipend of 50 gulden to live on. The money, however, was not sufficient to pay for her lifestyle of residing in hotels and inns with her girlfriend and six dogs.

== Spitzedersche Privatbank ==
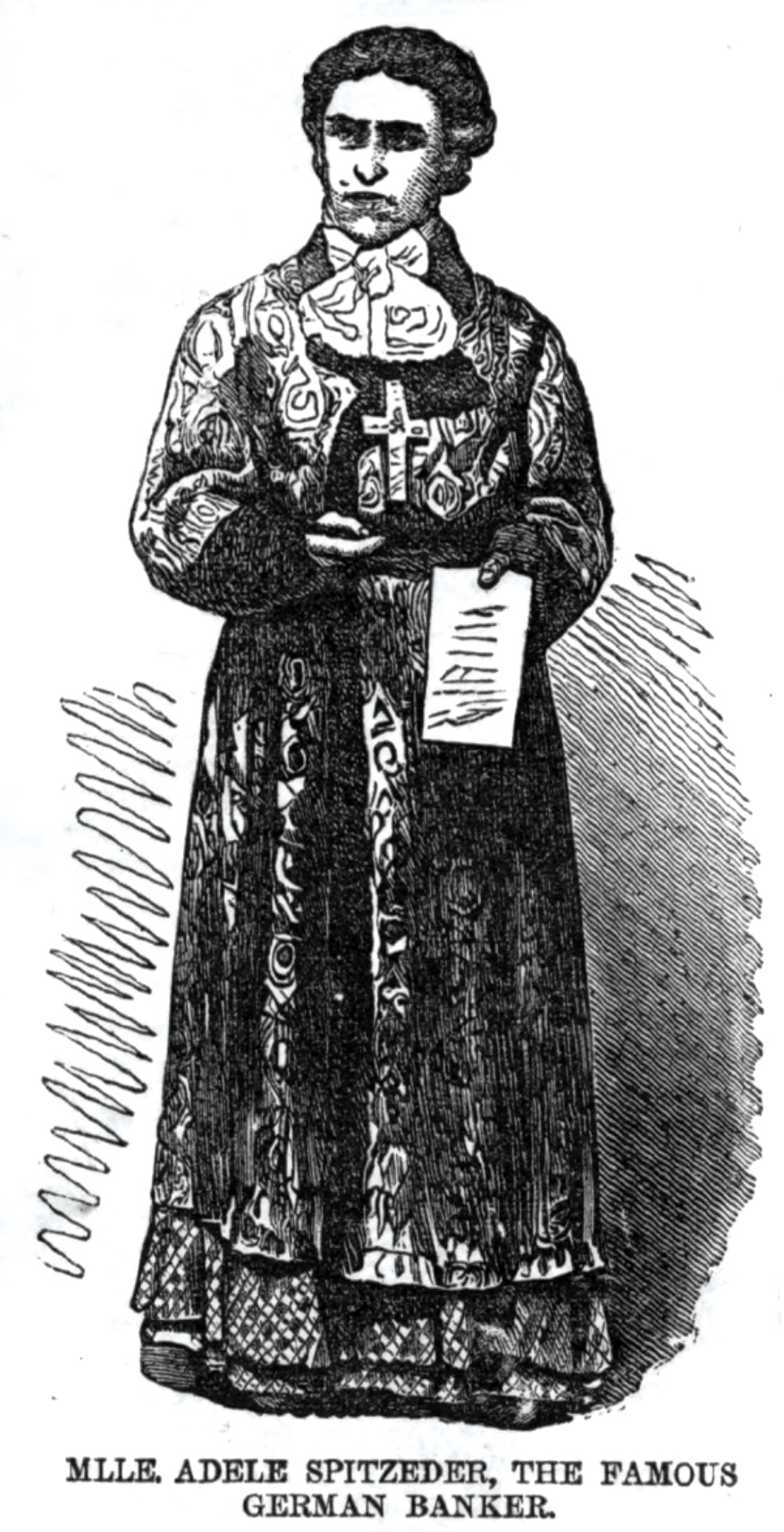
Sketch of Spitzeder in the 15 March 1873 issue of Harper's Weekly

Spitzeder soon had to borrow money from moneylenders to maintain her lifestyle. In late 1869, she met a carpenter's wife in Munich's Au district, then the city's poor neighborhood. After gaining her trust, Spitzeder claimed she knew someone who would pay the woman a return of 10 percent each month on her investments. The wife gave her 100 gulden and immediately received 20 gulden, two months of returns, with the promise of another 110 gulden within three months. According to a contemporary story in Harper's Weekly, Spitzeder also placed an advertisement in the city's major newspaper, the Münchner Neueste Nachrichten, asking to borrow 150 gulden with the promise of 10 percent interest after two months. Another contemporary source, a 1872 article in the Münchner Neueste Nachrichten citing her indictment, claims her first money lending activities started in the spring of 1869.

=== Growth of business ===
Spitzeder's banking services quickly became the talk of the town in Munich's poorer communities thanks to favorable word-of-mouth advertising and soon, more people gave her their savings. In 1869, she officially founded the Spitzedersche Privatbank. Because her customers were mostly workers from the northern outskirts of Munich, especially the town of Dachau, her bank also came to be known as "Dachauer Bank". Some farmers sold their farms to live off the interest alone. Many lower-class Christians mistrusted the Jewish moneylenders, preferring to bank with a Christian, and she soon had to rent additional rooms in her hotel to accommodate her up to forty employees. One of her employees was Rosa Ehinger, whose beauty and charm Spitzeder used to attract young men to the bank.

Spitzeder's business practices and accounting were unconventional and chaotic. Money was deposited in large sacks and in various cupboards. Her employees, all or almost all without training in accounting, regularly simply took money, with the accounting being restricted to recording the names of depositors and the amounts they paid in, often only signed with "XXX" by her illiterate customers. Her business relied solely on acquiring new customers quickly enough to pay existing customers with the newly acquired money. According to some sources, hers was the first known Ponzi scheme. Contemporaneous English-language publications such as Harper's Weekly referred to it as the "Spitzeder swindle". In her doctoral thesis, Hannah Davies recounts the case of Johann Baptist Placht, who in 1874 was indicted for running a Ponzi scheme in Vienna and notes that contemporaries compared his business model to Spitzeder's. Unlike Placht and other fraudsters, Spitzeder never made claims of investing the money and explicitly gave no securities, which paradoxically led customers to trust her more.

By October 1871, the proprietor of the hotel in which she was living and working was no longer willing to tolerate the customer traffic. Spitzeder moved into the house at No. 9 Schönfeld Street near the Englischer Garten which she bought for 54,000 gulden of her customers' money. Including bank employees, there were 83 people who worked from her house, many of whom were brokers who received a five-to-seven percent commission for each new customer. She soon expanded her business and started buying and selling houses and land throughout Bavaria, buying 17 houses in prime locations in Munich alone. By 1871, she received 50,000 to 60,000 gulden each day, although she had lowered her returns paid to 8% per month. Despite the size of her business, the bank had no premises of its own and all business was done first out of her hotel rooms and later her house. By 1871, Spitzeder was in possession of multiple millions of gulden and artwork valued at several million. According to a contemporary report in Harper's Weekly, at the height of her fortune in 1872 she was considered to be the wealthiest woman in Bavaria.

==== Clashes with authorities and competition ====
From 1871, the authorities tried to find legal reasons to stop her business but since she was fulfilling her obligations to her customers as promised, she avoided official intervention. While the city of Munich began taxing her as a "Bankier 2. Klasse" ("second class banker"), she avoided calls to be entered into the register of companies at this time. In 1872, the Munich Commerce Court decided that she had to enter her business in the register of companies, revising its earlier decision, which included rules about proper accounting. Since the court's ruling only applied to her money-lending business, she instead stopped lending and focused on taking in money. To circumvent the official ban on lending money, she allowed her workers to take money from the bank and lend it to customers under their own name. Some of her workers used this opportunity to enrich themselves, such as Franz Wagner, a scribe with a monthly salary of 60 gulden, who later bought a house for 59,000 gulden.

The success of the Dachauer Bank led to customers withdrawing large amounts of funds from other banks, especially the Sparkassen, threatening their existence. The Munich Sparkasse's leadership first discussed the competition by Spitzeder in May 1871, having lost some 50,000 gulden to her bank. In the fall of 1872, Bavaria's Minister of the Interior had to report to the king that the Sparkasse of Altötting had to resort to drastic measures to pay out all its customers who wished to invest with Spitzeder instead and the president of the government of Upper Bavaria noted on 29 October 1872 that the large amount of withdrawals might force the Sparkasse of Ingolstadt to recall its debts to be able to meet payout demands. Similar reports of large scale withdrawals were reported by the Sparkassen of Traunstein and Mühldorf. As a consequence, the Bavarian Ministry of the Interior placed large scale advertisements in a major newspaper on 30 October and 5 November 1872, warning customers to no longer invest with Spitzeder. On 7 November 1872, Munich's police also issued a lengthy statement detailing the bank's lack of reliability.

=== Public image ===
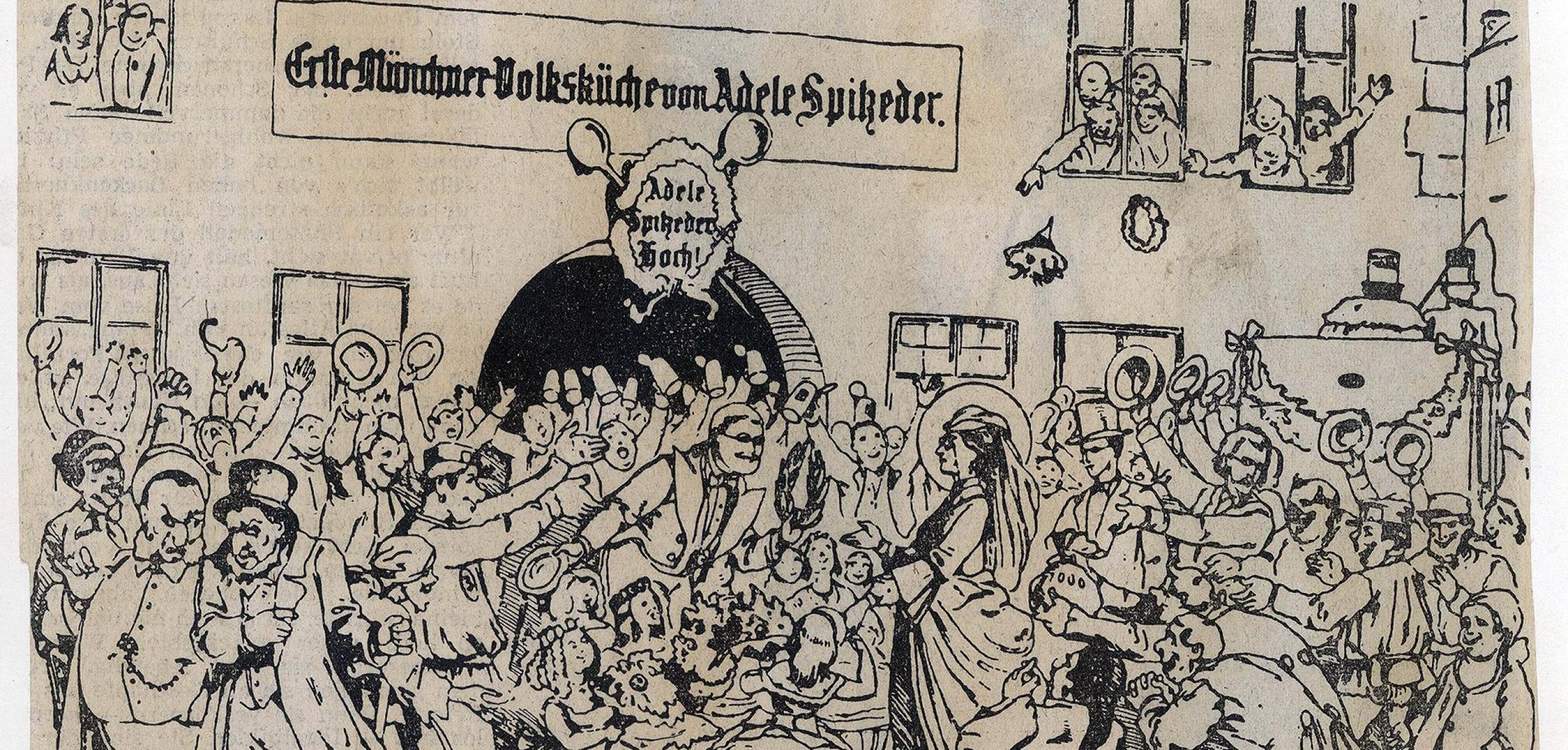
Caricature of Spitzeder opening one of her soup kitchens, from the Münchner Neueste Nachrichten

Spitzeder cultivated an image of a resolute, pious woman concerned for the public welfare. During banking hours at her house in Schönfeld Street she was often seen sitting on an elevated leather chair in the middle of her banking office wearing a red nightgown and a cross around her neck, demonstratively signing notes for the money she received. In the halls of the building, cutouts of the negative articles from the Münchner Neueste Nachrichten were posted in an attempt to demonstrate that she had nothing to fear from such coverage. The long lines of waiting customers were often entertained by musical groups playing outside the bank and she provided free meals and drinks at the tavern "Wilhelm Tell" next door. She only allowed deposits after all payouts had been processed, which often took until noon, thereby creating long queues of waiting customers that enforced the impression that they should consider themselves lucky to be allowed to give her money. Customers who reached her were treated with crass and direct language, with Spitzeder telling them that she did not call them nor would she give them any securities. Her flaunted honesty combined with her demonstrative warnings and the focus on entertaining her customers served to enhance her standing with the common people.

Spitzeder made generous donations to the Church, ostensibly for charity, and partook in regular pilgrimages to the Shrine of Our Lady of Altötting. Whenever she ventured to the hinterland, she treated the masses – who often welcomed her with cheers and gifts – to beer and hearty snacks. She also opened the "Münchner Volksküche" (Munich peoples' kitchen) at the Platzl, a tavern providing beer and food at discounted prices and with seating for up to 4,000 patrons, strengthening her image as the "angel for the poor". In total, she opened and operated twelve such soup kitchens. Her pious demeanor also persuaded local Catholic clergy to support her endeavors, bringing her new customers and shielding her from criticism by the government.

The publicity Spitzeder generated soon attracted the interest of the local newspapers. The foremost of her critics was the liberal Münchner Neueste Nachrichten which in 1870 began calling Spitzeder a fraudster and kept questioning her honesty and business practices until the end. In reaction to it, she placed an ad in every major newspaper – except the Münchner Neueste Nachrichten, which refused to print it – challenging her critics to demonstrate that she enticed her customers to give her money or that they were being disadvantaged. After attempts to bribe the Münchner Neuste Nachrichten's editor in chief, August Napoleon Vecchioni, to cease their criticism failed, Spitzeder turned to the newspaper's main rival, the Catholic-conservative Volksbote. A newspaper circulated in similar numbers as the Münchner Neueste Nachrichten, the Volksbote was in serious financial troubles which it solved with a 13,000 gulden loan from Spitzeder; in turn, the Volksbote responded to each criticism in the Münchner Neueste Nachrichten. Other conservative Catholic newspapers, especially Das Bayerische Vaterland published by Johann Baptist Sigl, also supported her and characterized criticism of Spitzeder as attempts by "Jewish capital" to discredit a pious and hard-working woman, tapping into the widespread antisemitism of the times.

From 1871, Spitzeder began publishing her own newspapers. She was granted ownership of the Süddeutscher Telegraph, the Neue Freie Volkszeitung and the Extrablatt when their respective publishers were unable to repay their loans. Additionally, she founded her own newspaper, the Münchener Tageblatt. Her popularity outside the city walls was enhanced significantly when she granted Theophil Bösl, the publisher of the Freier Landesboten, a loan of 14,000 gulden and Bösl in turn gave her written insurance not to report negatively on her business. Positive coverage in the Landesboten led to a large number of customers traveling to Munich to invest with the Dachauer Bank.

=== Bankruptcy and criminal charges ===
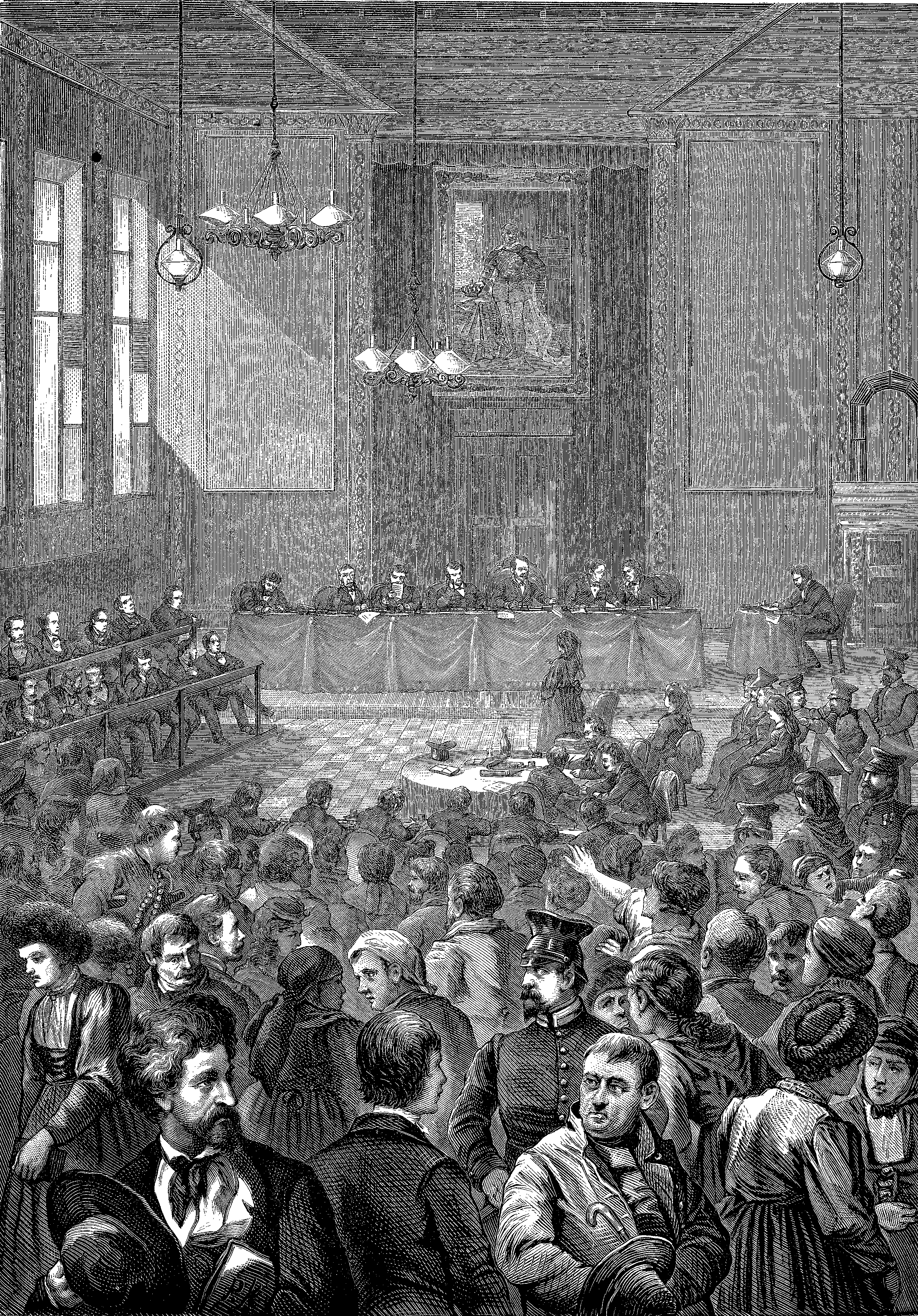
Adele Spitzeder in front of the Assizes. Original drawing by Peter Krämer, 1873.

Spitzeder withstood the pressure levied against her by the authorities and the Münchner Neueste Nachrichten for a while, mainly because banking laws and financial regulations were non-existent and because a few years prior, Bavaria had introduced legislation that allowed almost any business to operate with almost no oversight. In February 1872, an attempt by the Münchner Neueste Nachrichten to discredit her made a lot of customers ask for their investments back, but also brought a rise in new customers. In March 1872, Munich's police director had to admit that the attack, which the police had hoped would end Spitzeder's business, had failed. The Münchner Neueste Nachrichten started a new attack on Spitzeder in the fall of 1872, repeating the warnings of the authorities, explaining the possible ways the government might intervene and prophesying the immediate demise of the bank.

In November 1872, the withdrawals clearly exceeded the investments, forcing Spitzeder to limit withdrawals to an hour between six and seven in the morning, with no withdrawals on Wednesdays and Saturdays. The police persuaded 40 of her customers to present their claims to the district court, which then ordered a review of the bank's books. On 12 November 1872, a five-person inquiry commission arrived at the bank to perform a court-ordered review. Additionally, 60 customers, organized by rival private banks, visited her residence and demanded all of their money back, which was more than Spitzeder had available, leading to the bank's collapse.

Ehinger tried to flee with 50,000 gulden that she claimed was a gift from Spitzeder but both women were arrested and the money seized. Spitzeder's house was closed by the police and soldiers and policemen were placed on the premises to safeguard the remaining items of value and prevent acts of aggression by the populace. During her bank's existence, 32,000 customers were defrauded of 38 million gulden, roughly 400 million euros in 2017 money. After review, only assets corresponding to 15 percent of the investments were recovered. A wave of suicides by people who lost everything followed.

Spitzeder was accused of failure to keep books, embezzlement of customers' funds and excessive wasting of money; she was sentenced in July 1873 to three years and ten months in prison for fraudulent bankruptcy. She was not convicted of fraud itself because her business scheme did not meet the law's definition of fraud. During and after the trial, she refused to acknowledge any wrongdoing and maintained that her business was completely legal. The lack of legal requirements for accounting and the fact that she had never advertised any securities were accepted as mitigating circumstances. Ehinger was sentenced to six months in prison for aiding Spitzeder. For health reasons, Spitzeder was allowed to stay in the prison in Baader Street, Munich, where she wrote her memoir.

== Later life and death ==
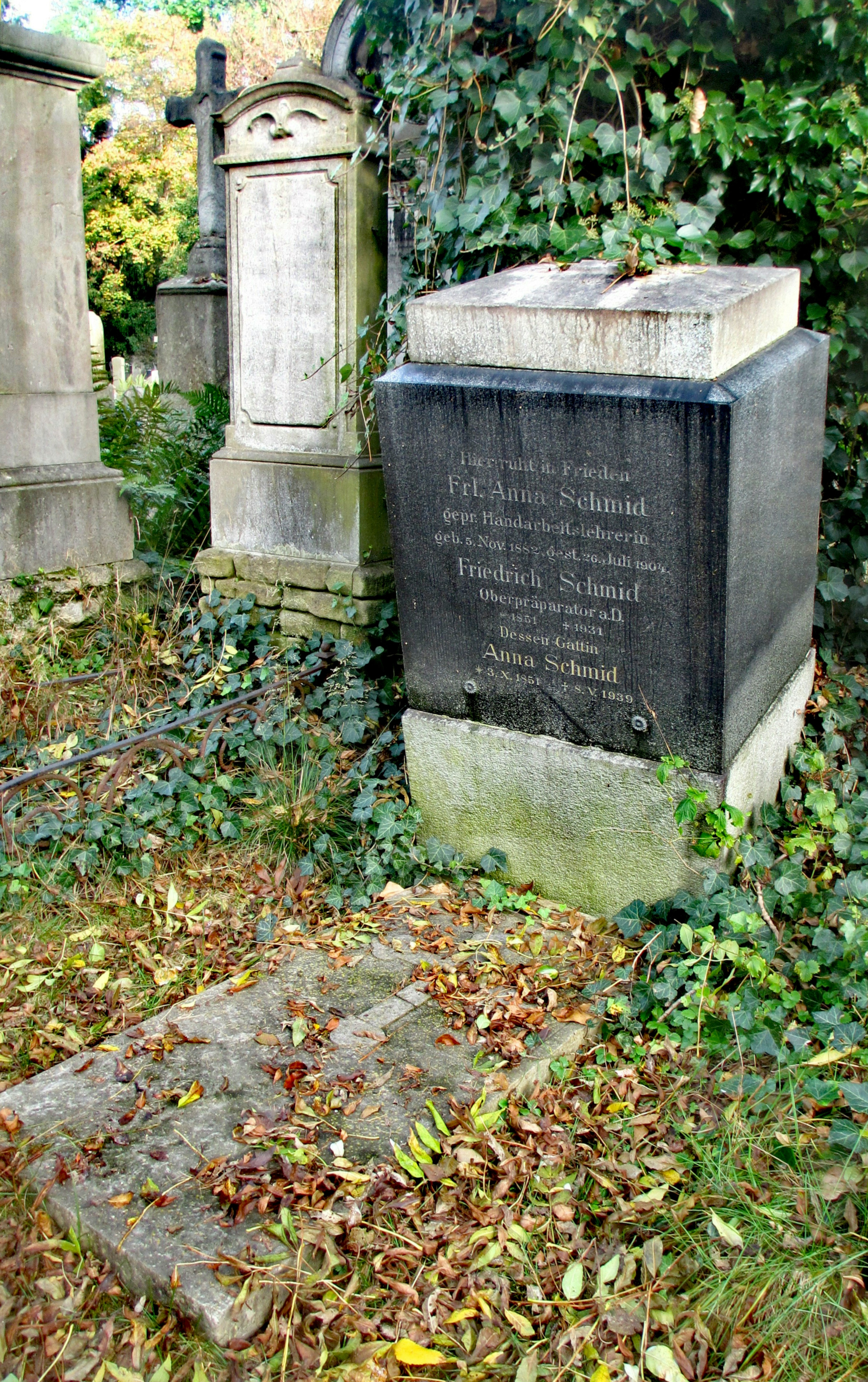
Adele Spitzeder's grave at Munich's Old Southern Cemetery

Spitzeder was released from prison on 9 September 1876 in poor health, being hemiplegic and unable to walk stairs on her own. During and after her stay in prison, those who had profited from her abandoned her and the newspapers that previously defended her made money by publishing exposés about her. However, some former customers, despite their losses, helped her; she found a place to stay with the widow of a judge and was given money. Her doctor prescribed her a stay at the sanatorium in Bad Wildbad where she went at her benefactors' expense. Shortly after arriving, she was surrounded by fans and received publicity in local newspapers. She lived in Bad Wildbad for ten months where she started writing music for the pianino. She met the director of a theater in Altona who offered her a guest role but she was received negatively. The local Altonaer Generalanzeiger newspaper commissioned the production of small whistles which they sold as "Spitzeder-whistles" for people to use at her next performance. Spitzeder however refused to act on the stage in Altona again and left the town for Berlin where people waited in anticipation to see the famous fraudster. However, before she could perform, the Berlin police prevented her performance and forced her to depart the city the same day, so she returned to Munich. No longer able to find work in Germany, she left for Vienna but the authorities there forbade any contact between her and the theater's director.

Unable to perform under her own name, she began composing music and performing as Adele Vio. In 1878, she published her memoir entitled Geschichte meines Lebens (Story of my life). In it, she had formulated plans for after her release from prison, such as opening a brewery in the Au, a large restaurant in western Munich, and a horse racing track near Nymphenburg Palace, none of which came to fruition.

After releasing her memoir, she again began to give out promissory notes that now contained explicit warnings that she was not providing any security and that the creditor has to be willing to waive any rights of reimbursement if she was not able to pay them back. She was arrested on 13 February 1880 with her new companion, Marie Riedmayer, who had cared for her after her release from prison. However, the local prosecutors determined that people who were still willing to give her money after all that had happened did not need to be protected and Spitzeder was released.

The constant scrutiny of the police was too much for her to bear and so she continued to perform as Adele Vio, living off friends and benefactors instead. She also still received the 50 gulden monthly that her mother had provided. Minor swindles led to further trials and periods of incarceration.

Spitzeder died of cardiac arrest in Munich on 27 or 28 October 1895 at age 63 and was buried in her family's plot in Munich's Alten Südlichen Friedhof cemetery with her parents. Her family posthumously changed her name to Adele Schmid.

== Personal life ==
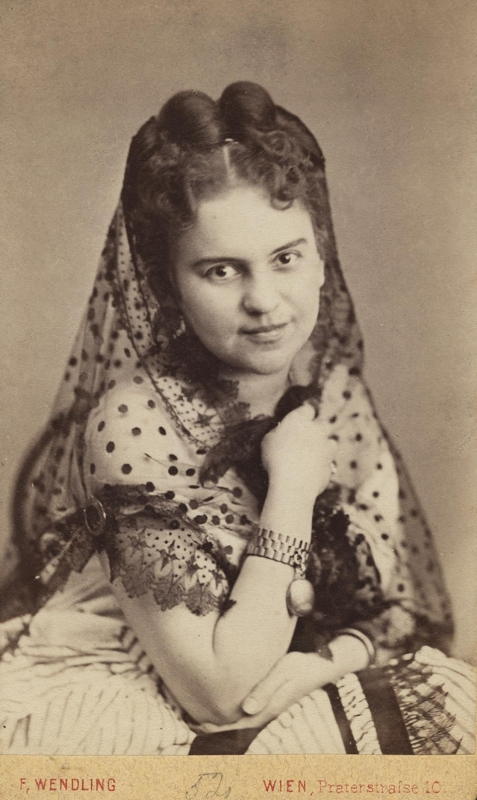
Josefine Gallmeyer, Spitzeder's first companion

Spitzeder never married, and she rejected numerous marriage proposals, including ones from men of the aristocracy. Despite her demonstrative Christian demeanor at a time when official Catholic doctrine declared homosexuality a sin, she tended to have an entourage composed mostly of young, attractive women. She was in relationships with multiple women. Spitzeder's first documented relationship was during her time in Brno with fellow actress Josefine Gallmeyer. However, as Gallmeyer was erratic and quickly grew bored with her, the relationship soon ended and Spitzeder left Brno for Munich. At some point during her acting career she met Emilie Stier (stage name Branizka) with whom she returned to Munich in 1868. During her trial, the court's president emphasized the intimate relationship between both women, who shared a bed "breast to breast".

The relationship continued into Spitzeder's banking career which Stier was actively supporting, with the Münchner Neueste Nachrichten soon reporting on "two tricksters that take people's money". However, the romantic relationship ended abruptly when after a fight Stier left the premises head over heels; the reason for their fight is unknown to this day. The end of the relationship depressed Spitzeder who locked herself in her rooms and only recovered because her customers, wishing to be able to invest in her bank again, cared for her until she recovered.

In need of a new companion, Spitzeder placed an advertisement in the local newspapers for a "Gesellschafterin" ("lady's companion"), a code that was known to refer to women seeking a female romantic partner. Out of a large number of applicants, she chose a French woman who however apparently did not understand the code and thus left her house after only a few weeks. Shortly afterwards, Rosa Ehinger moved into the house next door with her mother. Originally from Augsburg, Ehinger had dreams of becoming an actress, so Spitzeder, 19 years her senior, took the young woman, who soon started working in her bank, in and showered her with lavish gifts. After Spitzeder's arrest however, Ehinger disavowed her and denied having any romantic relationship with her. Ehinger even tried to argue that the payment of 50,000 gulden was damages for the reputational damage she suffered because of the rumors about her homosexuality, but she was ordered to repay the sum in full.

Following her release from prison, she was cared for by Marie Riedmayer, who was again described as her "Gesellschafterin" and who accompanied her to Bad Wildbad.

== In popular culture ==
Gabriel Gailler brought Adele Spitzeder's story to the stage as a play for marionettes in the 1870s. In 1966, Reinhard Raffalt created the play Das Gold der Bayern ("The gold of the Bavarians") for the Bayerisches Staatsschauspiel. Premiering in the Cuvilliés Theatre, it recounted a fictionalized tale of Spitzeder's life with a fictional king (Ludwig the Lion) stopping Spitzeder's trickery.

In 1972, Martin Sperr wrote a television movie Adele Spitzeder that was directed by Peer Raben and starred Ruth Drexel as Spitzeder. The play Die Spitzeder by Sperr was first performed on 11 September 1977. In 1992, the Bayerischer Rundfunk broadcast the documentary Adele Spitzeder oder das Märchen von den Zinsen ("Adele Spitzeder or the fairy tale about the interest") by Hannes Spring. Xaver Schwarzenberger adapted the story again as a television movie titled Die Verführerin Adele Spitzeder (A Deal with Adele). It was produced by the Bayerischer Rundfunk and the ORF, starred Birgit Minichmayr as Adele Spitzeder and was first broadcast on 11 January 2012.

== Literature ==
=== Books by Spitzeder ===
- Adele Spitzeder: Geschichte meines Lebens. Stuttgarter Verlagscomptoir, Stuttgart 1878 (original available as e-book); reprinted in 1996 by Buchendorfer Verlag, München, ISBN 978-3-927984-54-7

=== Literature about Spitzeder ===
==== Historical documentary ====
- Julian Nebel: Adele Spitzeder: Der größte Bankenbetrug aller Zeiten, FinanzBuch Verlag, München 2017, ISBN 978-3-959720-48-9.
- Dirk Schumann: Der Fall Adele Spitzeder 1872. Eine Studie zur Mentalität der "kleinen Leute" in der Gründerzeit. In: Zeitschrift für Bayerische Landesgeschichte 58. Jg. 1995, pp. 991–1026

==== Plays and novels ====
- Adele Spitzeder: Marionettenspiel um einen Münchner Finanzskandal im Jahre 1873; wortgetreue Wiedergabe einer alten Handschrift (in German). Puppentheatermuseum. 1981. ISBN 9780231546218. OCLC 75843921.
- Christine Spöcker: Das Geldmensch. Ein tragikomisches Stück über den kapitalistischen Exzess der Adele Spitzeder, Bankfrau zu München, die 1872 durch Bankrott ihrer Dachauer Bank 30860 Gläubiger ins Unglück trieb. Fischer, Frankfurt am Main 1973, ISBN 978-3-10-074201-8.
- Albrecht-Weinberger, Karl (1956). Adele Spitzeder; Roman einer seltsamen Frau (in German). Maindruck. OCLC 36066656.
- Rehn, Heidi (2009). Tod im Englischen Garten: historischer Kriminalroman (in German). Cologne: Emons Verlag. ISBN 9783897055070. OCLC 682116597.
