= Heinrich Schmelka =

German stage actor

Heinrich Ludwig Schmelka (1 December 1777 (Note: According to Eisenberg, Riga is a possible place of birth, he indicates both.) – 27 April 1837) was a German theatre actor, mainly in comic roles, occasionally also a singer (tenor)

== Life ==
Born in Schwedt, according to his own account, Schmelka descended from a noble family and spent his earliest youth in splendid prosperity. Later his people became impoverished and he spent a very sad youth.

He began his career as a juggler, but he soon freed himself from this inferior form of comedy.

Schmelka made his debut at the municipal theatre in Riga, later he was engaged in Prague and Breslau until 1818, when he came to the Königsstädtisches Theater in Berlin. There, he performed in plays by Adolf Bäuerle, Ferdinand Raimund, Karl von Holtei and others. His colleagues were Friedrich Beckmann, Ernst Ludwig Plock, Philipp Grobecker, Josef Spitzeder and Eduard Karl Rösicke. As it was usual for actors at that time, he was also a singer in Singspiel. A caricature from 1792 shows him in an operetta by Carl Ditters von Dittersdorf.

Schmelka died in Berlin-Pankow at the age of 59.
