= Friedrich Beckmann =

German comic actor (1803–1866)

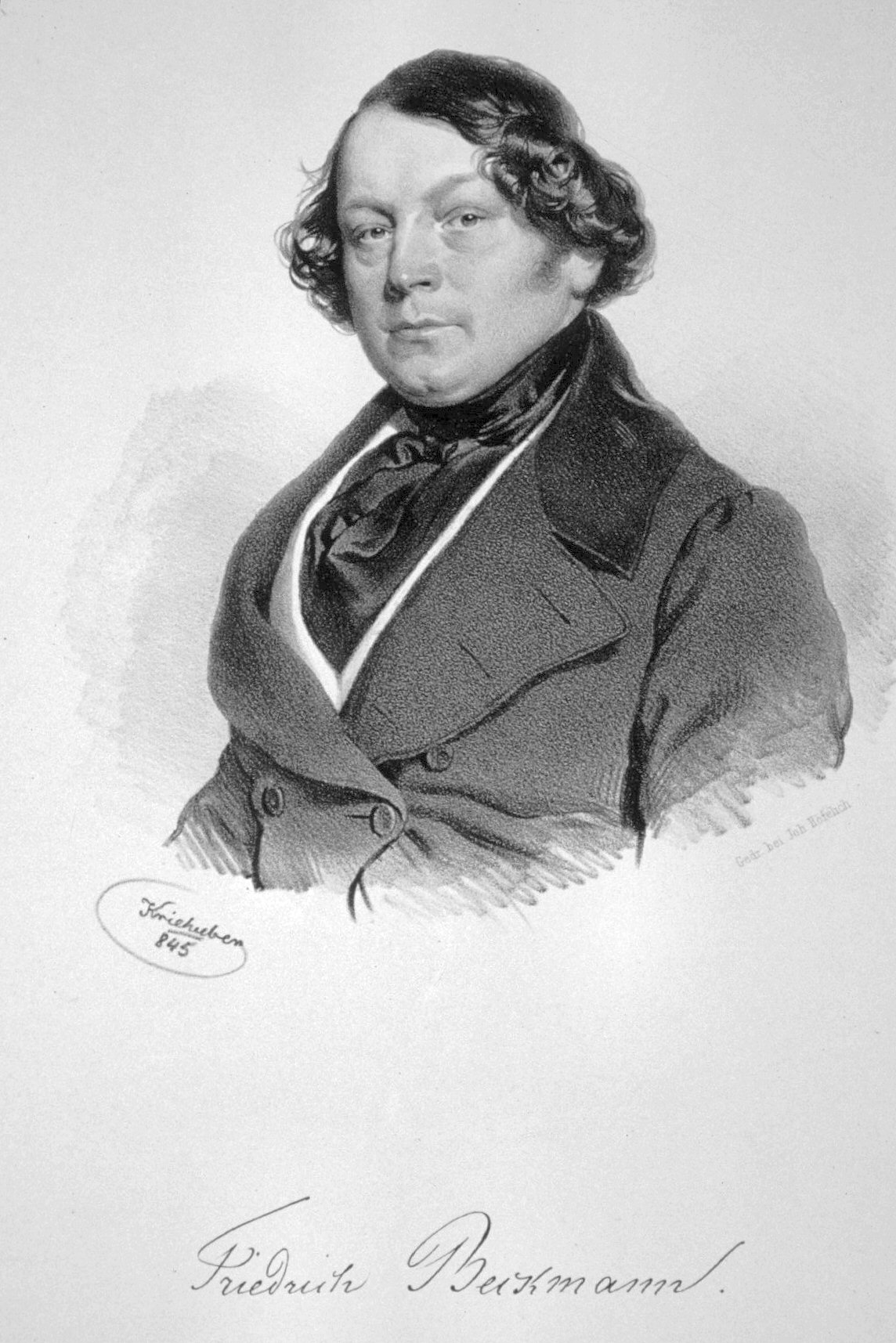
Lithograph by Josef Kriehuber

Friedrich Beckmann (13 January 1803 – 7 September 1866) was a German comic actor. He performed at the Königsstädtisches Theater in Berlin, and in Vienna at the Theater an der Wien and the Burgtheater. He became famous in Germany through his play Eckensteher Nante im Verhör.

== Life ==
Beckmann was born in Breslau (now Wrocław in Poland) in 1803, son of a small master potter. He was interested in the theatre as a youth, against his parents' wishes, and joined the chorus of the city theatre in Breslau, getting his first speaking role in 1820. His comic talent was recognised, and Heinrich Schmelka recommended him to the management of the Königsstädtisches Theater in Berlin, where he was engaged from 1824. He initially played small comic parts, but after Josef Spitzeder left the stage through illness he played leading roles.

He became famous particularly through his own play Eckensteher Nante im Verhör (1833), in which he played the comic character Eckensteher Nante. Beckmann based him on "Woodcutter Nante", a small role in Karl von Holtei's play Ein Trauerspiel in Berlin, and it was similar to the Viennese comic character Staberl. The printed play went through many editions, and was performed throughout Germany.

He made a guest appearance at the Theater an der Wien in Vienna in 1841; after a second appearance in 1845 he was engaged at the theatre by Franz Pokorny. He was a leading member of the company at the Burgtheater in Vienna from 1846, remaining there until his death in 1866.

He married in 1838 the opera singer Adele Muzzarelli. After his death she established the Friedrich Beckmann Foundation, to support German actors in need.

== His acting qualities ==
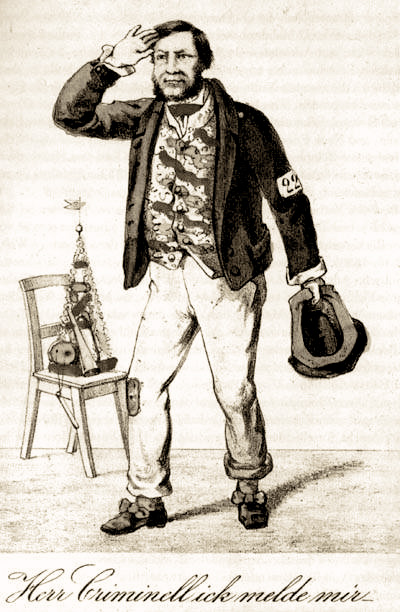
The frontispiece to Eckensteher Nante im Verhör (Berlin 1833)

His biographer in Biographisches Lexikon des Kaiserthums Oesterreich (1856) wrote: "Beckmann is a great researcher of human nature, he listens to people's drollest utterances, their comical nuances, their most humorous weaknesses and excesses, and gives them back again intact, unadulterated, with milder rather than more garish colours.... Beckmann is one of those artists of the Vienna Hofburgtheater who are always treated by the audience, in life and on the stage, with special benevolence and tremendous sympathy."

His biographer in Allgemeine Deutsche Biographie (1875) wrote: "Beckmann was of irresistibly comic vigour, and in particular he did this by means of a cosy, comfortable quality, which was peculiar to his performances, and by a wealth of droll ideas with which he loved to dress up his roles. He was not exactly strong in character, but nevertheless his achievements pleased and were compellingly effective, because of the sunny cheerfulness that flowed from his whole personality."
