= Tunçay Kulaoğlu =

Tunçay Kulaoğlu (born 1966 in İzmir) is a German-Turkish filmmaker, journalist, and translator.

== Career ==
Kulaoğlu co-founded the "Turkey Film Days" in Nuremberg in 1992 and served as its curator until 2007. The festival was renamed "InterFilmFestival" in 1998 and has been known as the "Turkey/Germany Film Festival" since 2003. In 1999, he founded the film distribution company "sanartfilm" to support the festival. This company distributes Turkish films in Germany, and Kulaoğlu has also translated dozens of films into German for it. In December 2004, he organized the film workshop "Europe in Motion: Moving Images, Shifting Perspectives in Transcultural Cinema" in Berlin. He is also a co-founder of the association "kulturSPRÜNGE".

His short film "The Shave" premiered in March 2006 at the Turkey/Germany Film Festival and was screened in the "Leopards of Tomorrow" competition at the Locarno International Film Festival. It received the "Valuable" rating from the German Film Rating Board (FBW) and was shown at more than 30 international film festivals (including the Miami Gay and Lesbian Film Festival and the Rhode Island International Film Festival).

He also worked as an assistant director on Thomas Arslan's film "From Afar" (2006).

Since 2006, Kulaoğlu has worked extensively in the theater as a dramaturge for Neco Çelik. He participated in all three of Çelik's theater productions: in March 2006, "Black Virgins" by Feridun Zaimoğlu and Günter Senkel (performed as part of the "Beyond Belonging – Migration 2" series at the Hebbel am Ufer (HAU) in Berlin); in March 2007, Zaimoğlu/Senkel's adaptation of "Romeo and Juliet" (also at the HAU as part of "Beyond Belonging – Autoput Avrupa from Istanbul to Berlin"); and in November 2007, "Excluded" by Xavier Durringer at the Munich Kammerspiele.

As the successor to Shermin Langhoff as director of the Berlin off-theater Ballhaus Naunynstraße, Kulaoğlu, together with Wagner Carvalho, founder of the Brazilian dance festival "Move Berlin," will take over the directorship of the Kreuzberg theater in 2012.

Both have been closely associated with the theater for many years, the Ballhaus announced on Friday. The Kreuzberg theater has become known nationwide for its intercultural works and productions such as "Crazy Blood."

== Personal life ==
Tunçay Kulaoğlu lives in Berlin.

== Filmography ==
- 1996: The Outcast – Director and Screenwriter – Short film
- 2005: The Shave (Traş) – Co-director and Co-Screenwriter (with Martina Priessner) – Short film
- 2007: Aliens from Anatolia – Video lecture on Turkish science fiction of the 1960s-80s
- 2009: The Six Days of Adam and Eve – Co-director and Co-Screenwriter (with Martina Priessner) – Short film

== Publications ==
- The new 'German' film is 'Turkish'? A new generation brings life to the film landscape. Filmforum 16 (February/March 1999), pp. 8–11
