= Sigl =

SIGL or Sigl may refer to:

- The Système Intégré de Gestion de Licenses, the European Union's system for managing import licences
- The locomotive company Aktien Gesellschaft der Lokomotiv-Fabrik vormals G. Sigl
- Georg Sigl, an Austrian engineer
- Johann Baptist Sigl, a German publicist
- An alternate spelling of the name Siegel
