= Placht =

Placht is a surname. Notable people with the surname include:

- Elias Placht (1690–unknown), Czech-Austrian violin maker and founder of Cheb Violin Making School
- Johann Baptist Placht, 19th-century Austrian fraudster
- Otto Placht (born 1962), Czech artist
- Richard Placht, designer of the Wound Medal (Austria-Hungary)
