= Juliane Déry =

German writer (1864–1899)

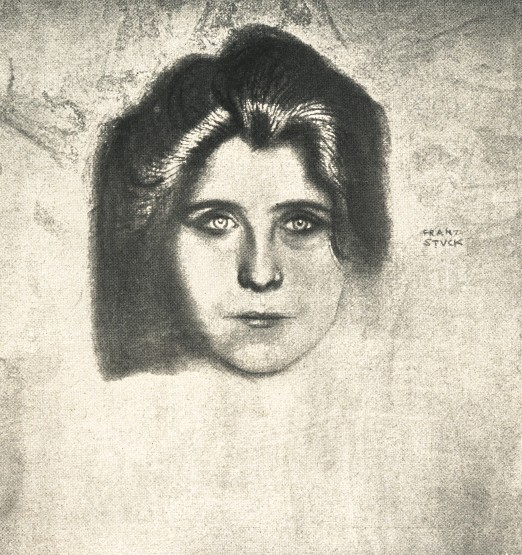
- Juliane Déry in a painting by Franz von Stuck, around 1898
- Born: 10 August 1864; Baja, Hungary, Austrian Empire
- Died: 31 March 1899 (aged 34); Berlin
- Occupations: Novelist , Playwright

Juliane Déry (born Dewicz or Dexy on 10 August 1864 in Baja, Austrian Empire – died 31 March 1899 in Berlin) was a German language novelist and playwright.

== Life ==
Juliane Déry was born in Baja, the daughter of a German-Jewish merchant, Moritz Dewicz. She spent her childhood there and wrote her first poems in Hungarian. In 1873, the family moved to Vienna and converted to Catholicism. The surname was translated into Hungarian as Decsy (Magyarization) and changed to Déry. Déry's father committed suicide after 1873. The family subsequently lived in extreme poverty in Vienna, where Derry learned German, attended a girls' secondary school, and in 1890 received her teaching diploma from the St. Anne's Convent School. During this early period, she also met Arthur Schnitzler, who was not yet a well-known figure at the time.

Karl Emil Franzos encouraged Déry to devote herself to writing. In 1888, he published one of her short novels in his magazine Deutsche Dichtung (German Poetry). In 1890, Derry went to Paris, where, at the initiative of Princess Mathilde, she entered the city's literary circles; among other things, she was a guest at Juliette Adam's salon. In 1893, Déry left Paris for Germany.

In the same year, her one-act play Begegnung bei Pignerols in Coburg (Meeting at Pignerols in Coburg) was first performed at the court theatre of Ernest II, Duke of Saxe-Coburg and Gotha, who was her patron. The play was also performed at the Königsstädtisches Theater in Berlin, introducing Déry to a wider audience as a playwright. From 1895 to 1898, she lived in Munich and played a key role in founding the Intimate Theater. Déry wrote for the Neue Deutsche Rundschau (New German Review), Quickborn, and S. Fischer Verlag. In Munich, she became associated with the writers of the magazine Die Gesellschaft and became acquainted with Franz von Stuck, whom she illustrated several times.

In 1898, Déry moved to Berlin. While still in Paris, she was implicated in the Dreyfus affair and accused of espionage. After her engagement in Berlin fell through, possibly due to developments in the Dreyfus trial, Déry committed suicide by jumping out of a window in 1899.

== Works ==
=== Short novels ===
- Hoch oben. Novellen. Bonz, Stuttgart 1888.
- Ohne Führer. (Die Einwilligung. Am Kreuzweg.) Bonz, Stuttgart 1891.
- Rußland in Paris. 1893. (Text zum Download)
- Katastrophen. Neue Novellen. Bonz, Stuttgart 1895.
- Hans der Pechvogel. Eine Rabengeschichte. 1900.

=== Plays ===
- Die Verlobung bei Pignerols (Lustspiel) 1891.
- Das Amulet. Lustspiel in 1 Aufzug. Bonz, Stuttgart 1891.
- D’ Schand'. Volksstück in sechs Bildern. Albert, München 1894.
- Es fiel ein Reif. Drama in einem Akt. S. Fischer, Berlin 1896. (Digitalisat)
- Die sieben mageren Jahre. Drama. 1896.
- Die sieben mageren Kühe. Komödie in drei Akten. S. Fischer, Berlin 1897.
- Die selige Insel. Dramatisches Idyll. Schuster & Loeffler, Berlin 1897. (Digitalisat)
