= Josephine Pagay =

Austrian actress

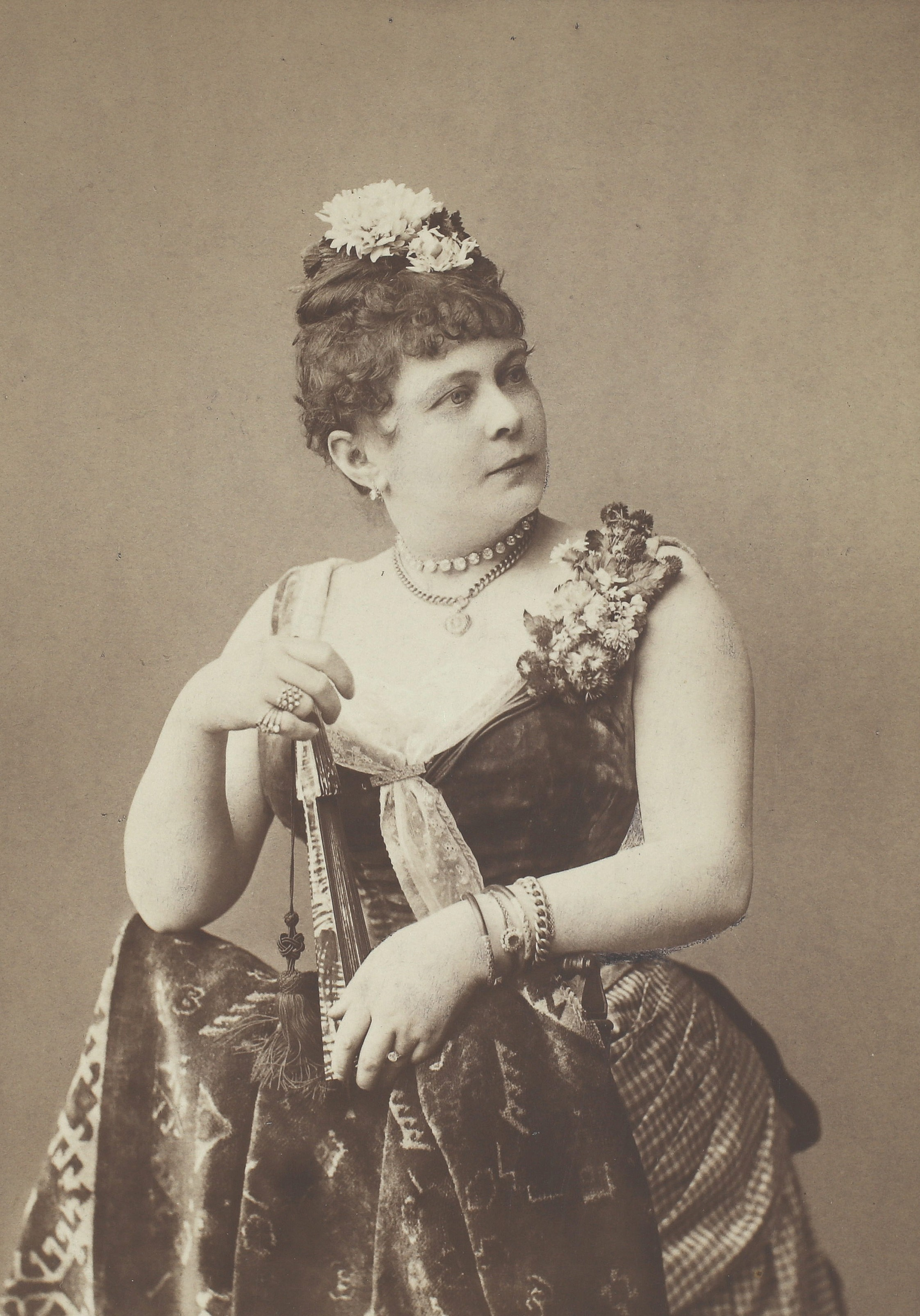
- Photograph, c. 1870 – 1880
- Born: Josephine Papigay; 15 December 1849; Vienna, Austria
- Died: 18 November 1892 (aged 42); Berlin, Germany
- Relatives: Hans Pagay (brother)

Josephine Pagay (15 December 1849 – 11 November 1892) was an Austrian actress. She made her first appearance at the age of fourteen in the role of Cupido in Orpheus in der Unterwelt at the Quaitheater, Vienna. Her spirited delivery, humour, and histrionic talents made her a favorite with the public, and she scored triumphs in the operettas of Offenbach, Suppé, Millöcker, and Strauss, and in the farces of Kaiser, Bittner, Berla, Costa, and Langer. She was at the height of her career in the 1860s and 1870s, but in 1886 she left the stage and retired to Berlin.
