= Muzzarelli =

Muzzarelli is an Italian surname. Notable people with the surname include:

- Adele Muzzarelli (1816–1885), Italian soprano, soubrette and dancer
- Alfonso Muzzarelli (1749–1813), Italian Jesuit theologian and scholar
- Gian Carlo Muzzarelli (born 1955), Italian politician
