= Henriette Spitzeder =

German operatic soprano (1800–1828)

- Born: Henriette Schüler; 18 March 1800; Dessau, Kingdom of Prussia
- Died: 30 November 1828 (aged 28); Berlin, German Confederation
- Other names: Henriette Spitzeder-Schüler
- Occupations: Operatic soprano; actress
- Organizations: Nuremberg Opera; Theater am Kärntnertor; Königsstädtisches Theater
- Spouse: Josef Spitzeder

Henriette Spitzeder née Schüler, also Henriette Spitzeder-Schüler (18 March 1800 – 30 November 1828), was a German operatic soprano and actress. She began her career in Nuremberg. Together with her husband, the bass Josef Spitzeder, she moved on to the Theater am Kärntnertor in Vienna and the Königsstädtisches Theater in Berlin. The couple often appeared together on stage, including as Mozart's Figaro and Susanna.

== Life ==
Born Henriette Schüler in Dessau, she was the daughter of the comedian Carl Schüler (1775–1809) and Eugenie Schüler née Bonasegla. Her mother, a famous opera singer, was the daughter of the Italian singer and musician Giuseppe Bonasegla (c. 1740–1820), music teacher at the Philanthropin. Her parents moved to several theatres. In Kassel, she was educated at a boarding school. After her father died in 1809, her mother moved to the Karlsruhe Court Theatre in 1812, where she was also Henriette's voice teacher.

Henriette Schüler, made her debut at the age of 14 at the Nuremberg Opera, under the pseudonym Dlle. Schäfer as Queen of the Night in Mozart's Die Zauberflöte. Her intonation, pure voice and precision was noted. A 1815 review in the Morgenblatt für gebildete Stände mentioned her full, pleasant voice and musicality. She also performed roles in plays. In 1816, she married Josef Spitzeder, a bass singer. The couple appeared together as Figaro and Susanna in Mozart's Le nozze di Figaro, and as Sextus and Publius in La clemenza di Tito, among others. In 1819, she and her husband joined the company of the Theater am Kärntnertor court opera in Vienna, beginning as High Priest and Donna Elvira in Peter Winter's Das unterbrochene Opferfest on 22 April 1819. She became particularly popular as Zerlina in Mozart's Don Giovanni and as Cherubino in Le nozze di Figaro. She also appeared as a guest, such as to the Königsstädtisches Theater in Berlin. She was engaged there, together with her husband, and was successful especially in coloratura roles. She retired from the stage in 1828, and died in Berlin giving birth to her tenth child, not even 28 years old.
