= Brunswick Palace =

Palace in Lower Saxony, Germany

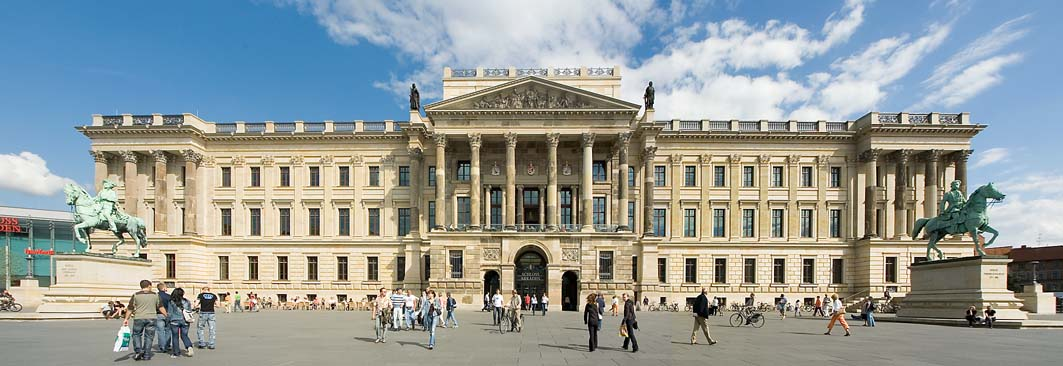
- The new façade with its equestrian statues in August 2007

- Location within Lower Saxony Location within Germany

General information
- Architectural style: Neoclassical
- Location: Braunschweig, Lower Saxony, Germany
- Coordinates: 52.2634°N 10.5275°E
- Construction started: 1718 (reconstruction 2007)

Brunswick Palace (German: Braunschweiger Schloss or Braunschweiger Residenzschloss) on the Bohlweg in the centre of the city of Brunswick (German: Braunschweig), was the residence of the Brunswick dukes from 1753 to 8 November 1918.

== History ==
Work on the first building was begun in 1718 under the direction of Hermann Korb. After the building burned down in 1830, a second palace was built by Carl Theodor Ottmer, being completed in 1841. It was completely demolished in 1960 at the direction of the city council because of the heavy damage that it had suffered in air raids during the Second World War.

The Palace Park (Schlosspark) was laid out on the resulting waste ground, which was completely removed in the spring of 2005 after another resolution of the city council in 2004 to erect a large shopping centre, the so-called Schloss-Arkaden (Palace Arcades), and by spring 2007, the land that had been cleared. Its western façade was to consist of a faithful reconstruction of the façade of Ottmer's palace. The building was opened to the public on 6 May 2007.

== Distinctions ==
- 2009: Peter Joseph Krahe Prize

== Gallery ==
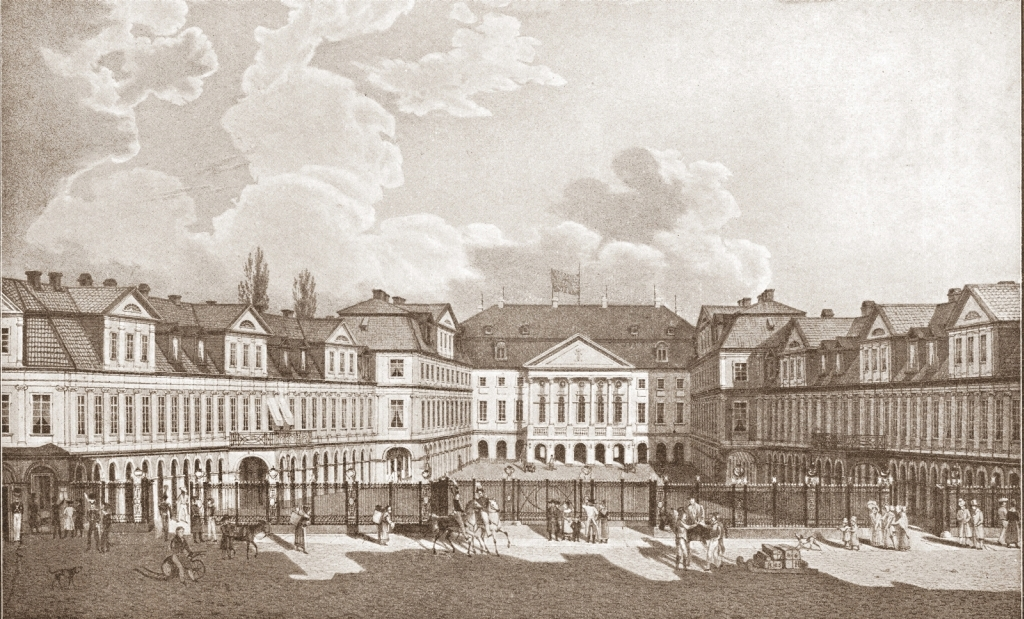
Brunswick Palace before 1830

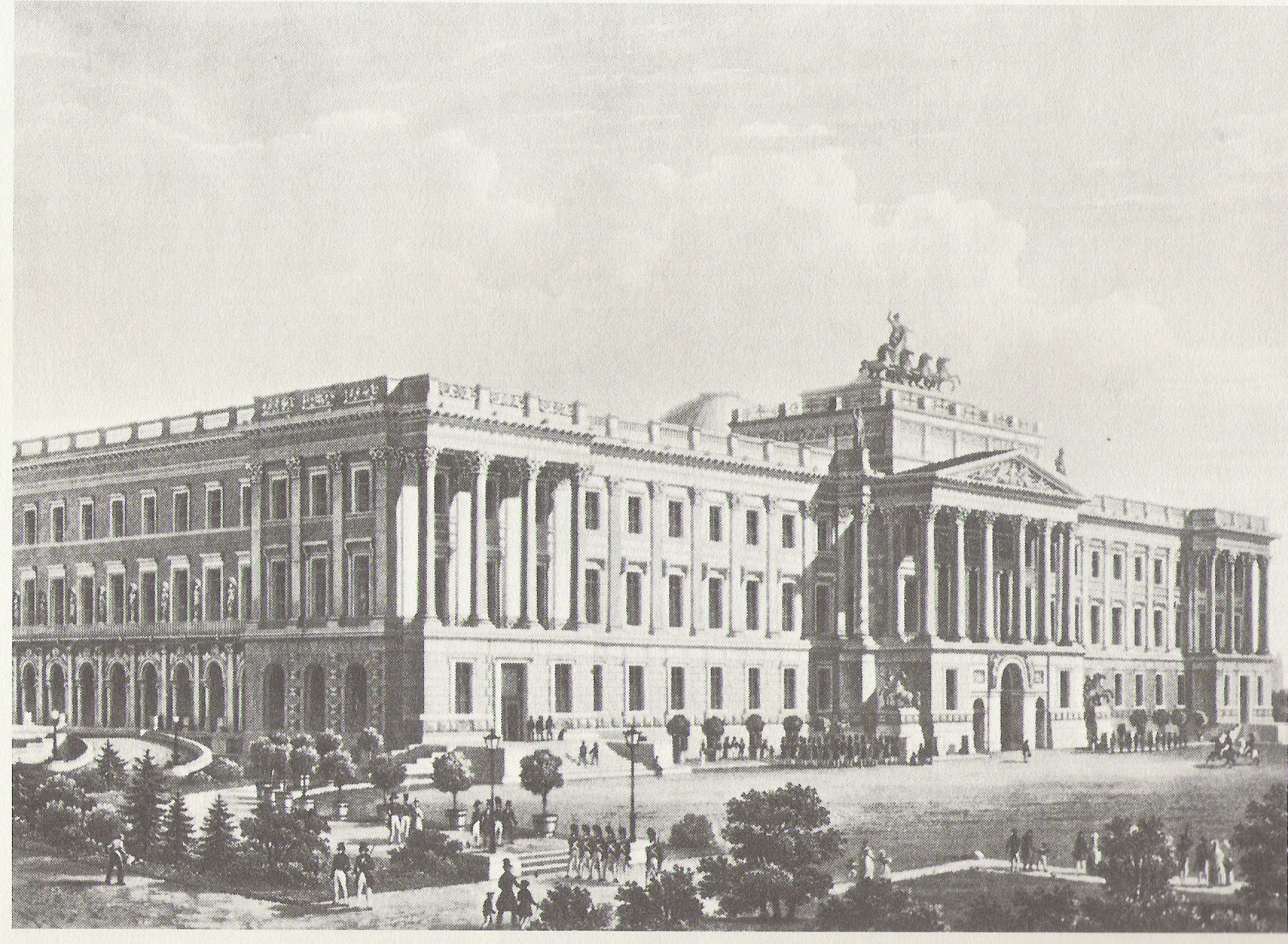
Brunswick Palace c. 1840

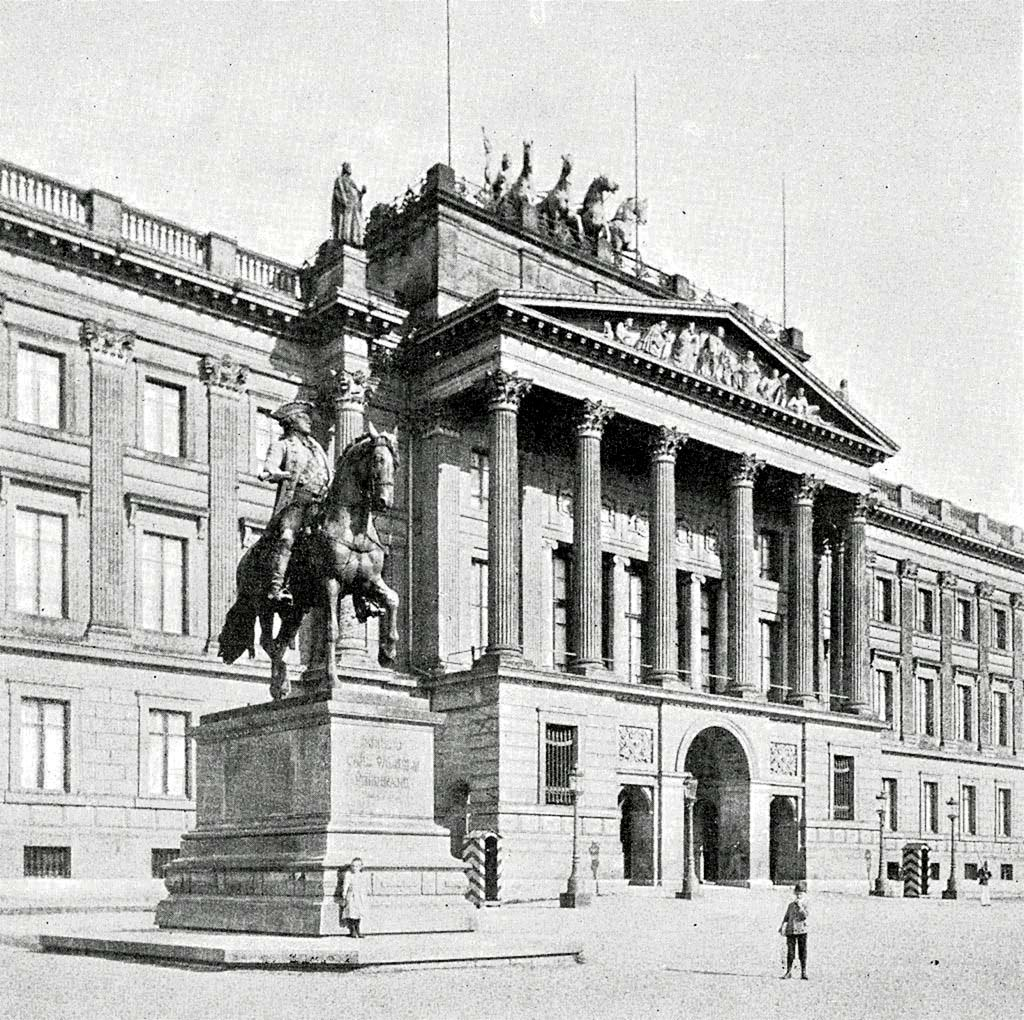
Brunswick Palace in 1897

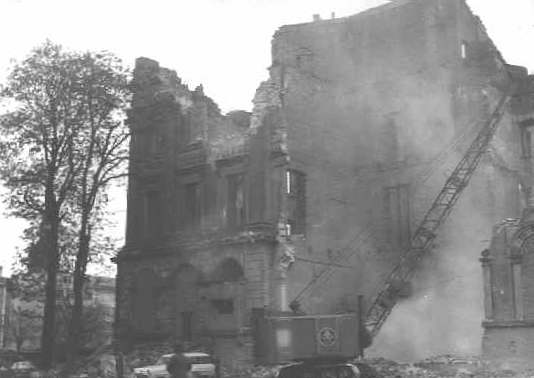
Demolition in 1960

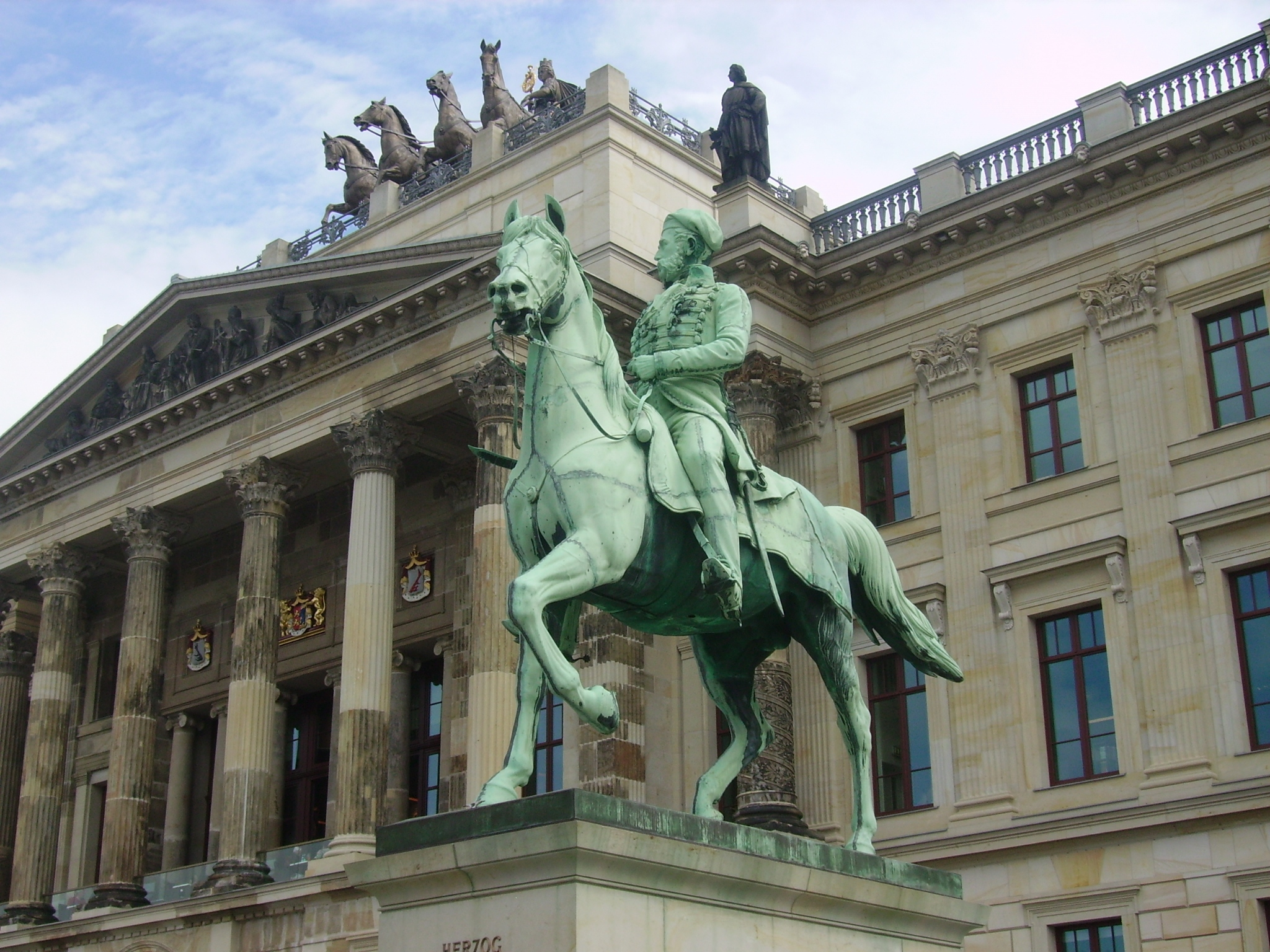
Sculpture of Frederick William, Duke of Brunswick-Wolfenbüttel in front of Brunswick Palace

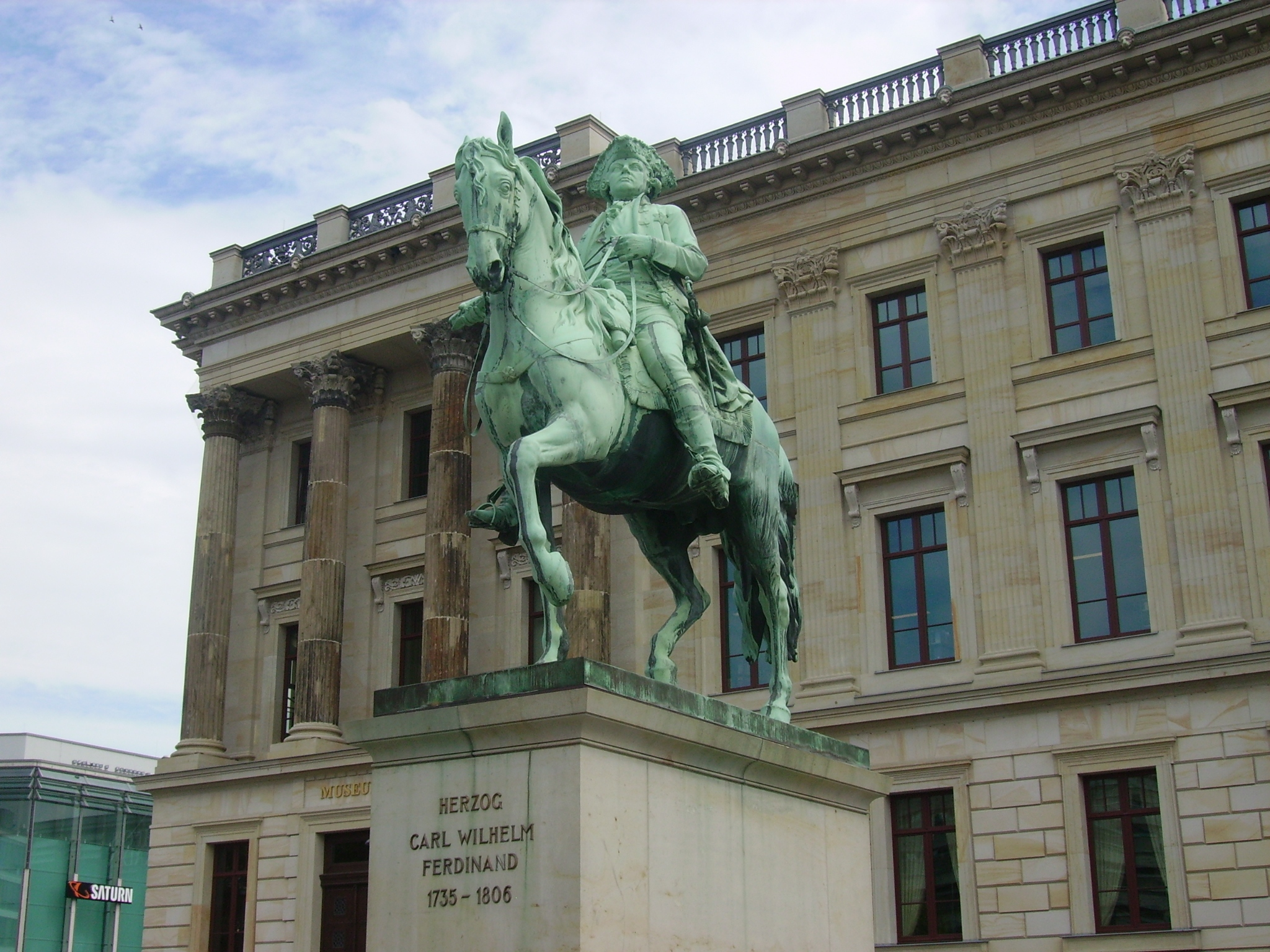
Sculpture of Charles William Ferdinand, Duke of Brunswick-Wolfenbüttel in front of Brunswick Palace

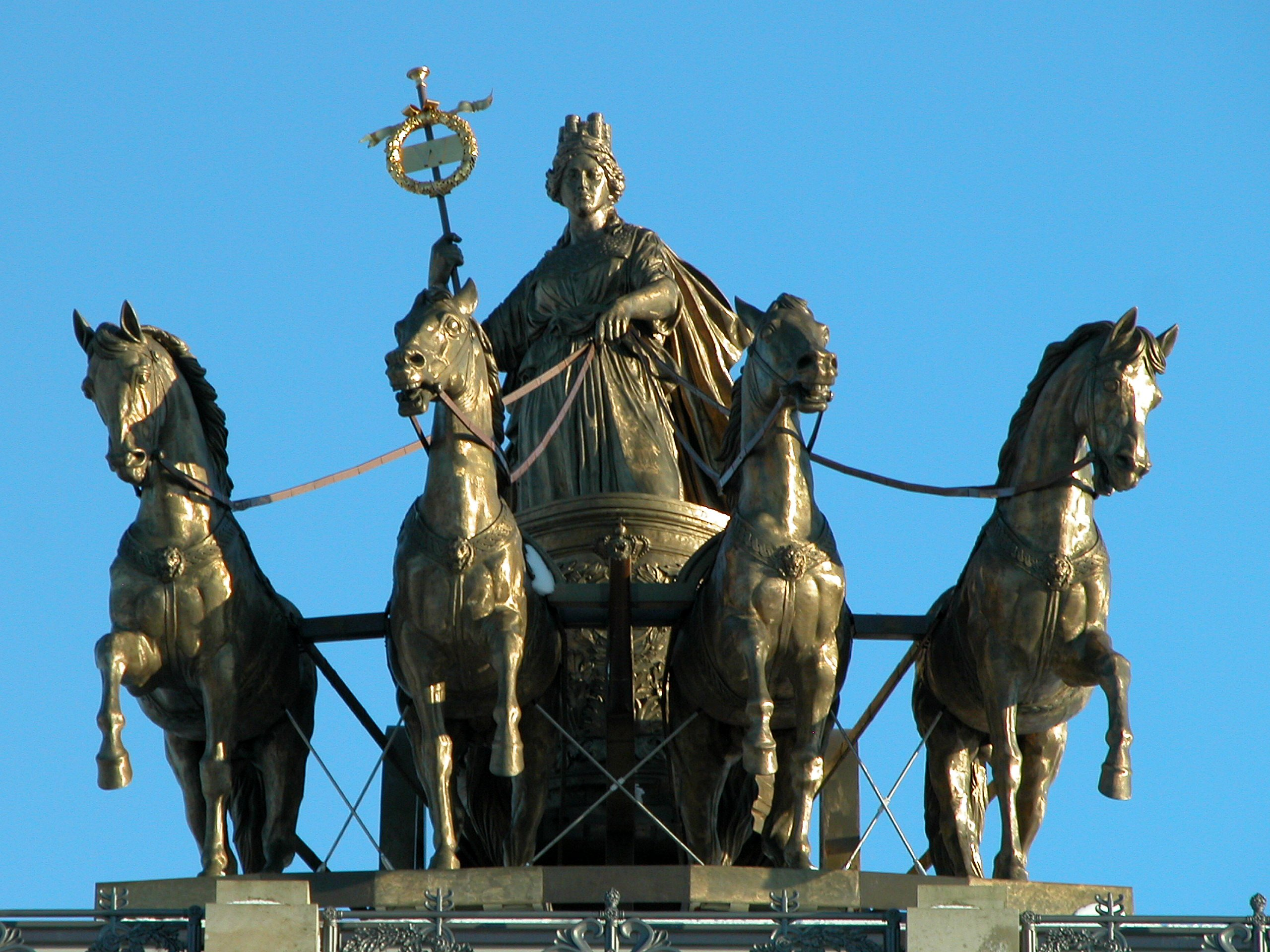
Quadriga

== Sources ==
- Bernd Wedemeyer: Das ehemalige Residenzschloß zu Braunschweig. Eine Dokumentation über das Gebäude und seinen Abbruch im Jahre 1960. 2. Aufl., Braunschweig 1993
