= Betty Vio =

German opera singer

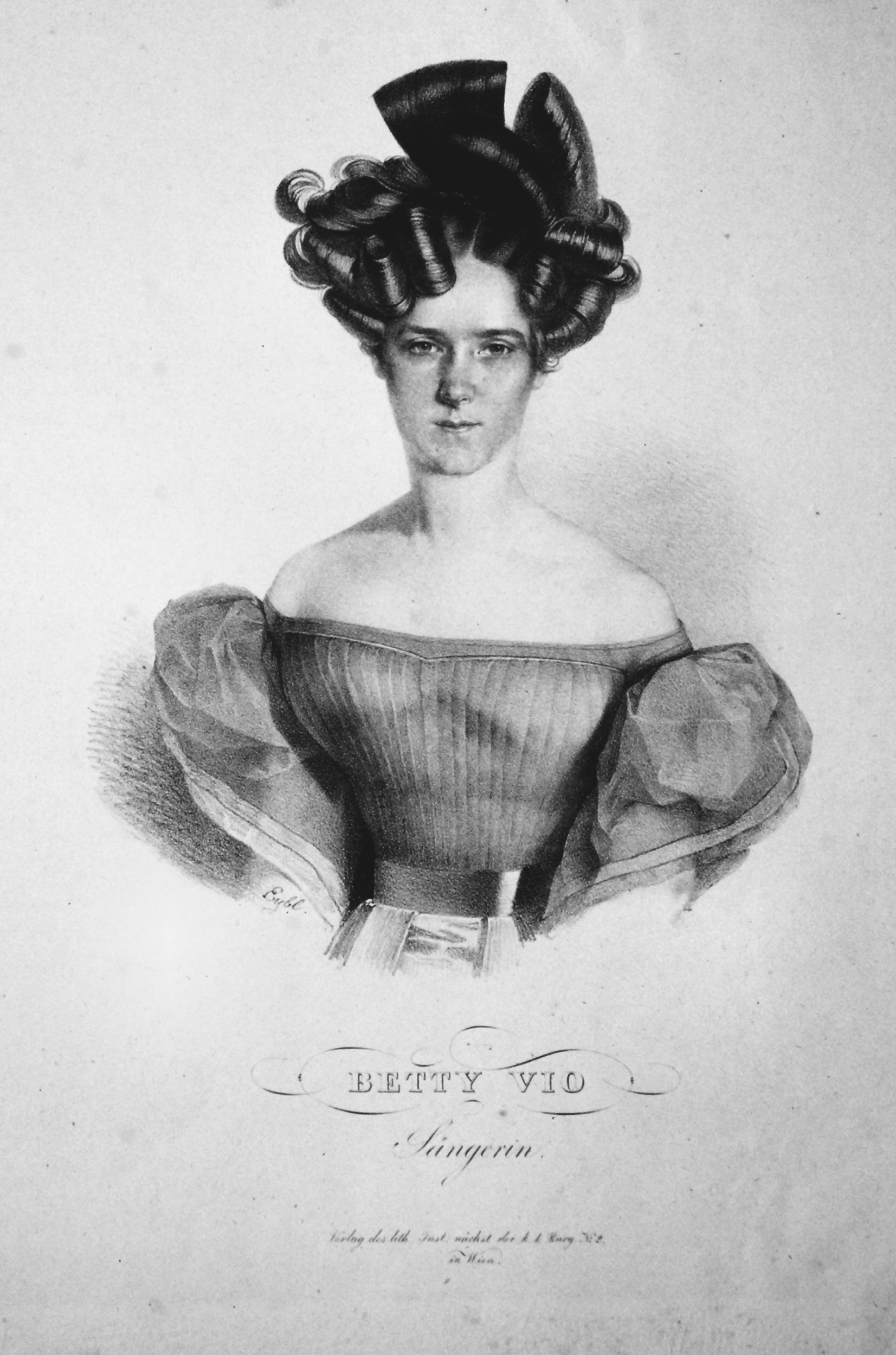
Betty Vio (1830)

Elisabeth "Betty" Spitzeder-Vio (1806 or 1808–1872), also known as Betty Maurer, was an Italian-German opera singer (soubrette / soprano) and actress. She was the mother of Adele Spitzeder (1832–1895) from her first husband, Josef Spitzeder (1794/96–1832).

Vio's birth date is unknown, with sources both mentioning 22 June 1806 and 22 June 1808. One contemporary source puts her age in 1812 as nine years old, meaning she would have been born in 1802 or 1803. Her father is usually named as the Italian noble Francesco Vio, but the fact that she was born in Lübeck makes it more likely that her parents were (Georg Friedrich) Wilhelm Vio and Philippine Vio (né Dupont) who were engaged in Lübeck from 1799 to 1809 and performed with Betty beginning in 1810 at the Bergisches Theater in Düsseldorf.

Vio studied singing with Antonio Salieri and Giuseppe Ciccimarra in Vienna and was engaged at the Vienna State Opera in 1825. In 1829, she was hired at the Berlin Court Opera as a replacement for Henriette Sontag but followed her first husband Josef Spitzeder, whom she married in 1831, to Munich in 1832. After his death, she returned to Berlin, where their daughter Adele Spitzeder was born.

She later married Franz Maurer and moved to Graz and had some engagements at the Carltheater in Vienna. In 1844, her daughter Adele persuaded Vio to move back to Munich, where the family lived with Adele's half-siblings and cousins. Vio died on 15 December 1872 in Munich.
