= Carl Theodor Ottmer =

German architect

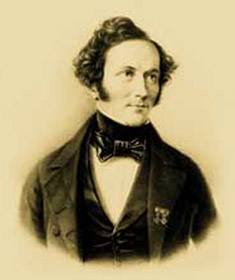
Carl Theodor Ottmer (date unknown)

Carl Theodor Ottmer (19 January 1800 in Braunschweig – 22 August 1843 in Berlin) was a German architect.

== Life ==
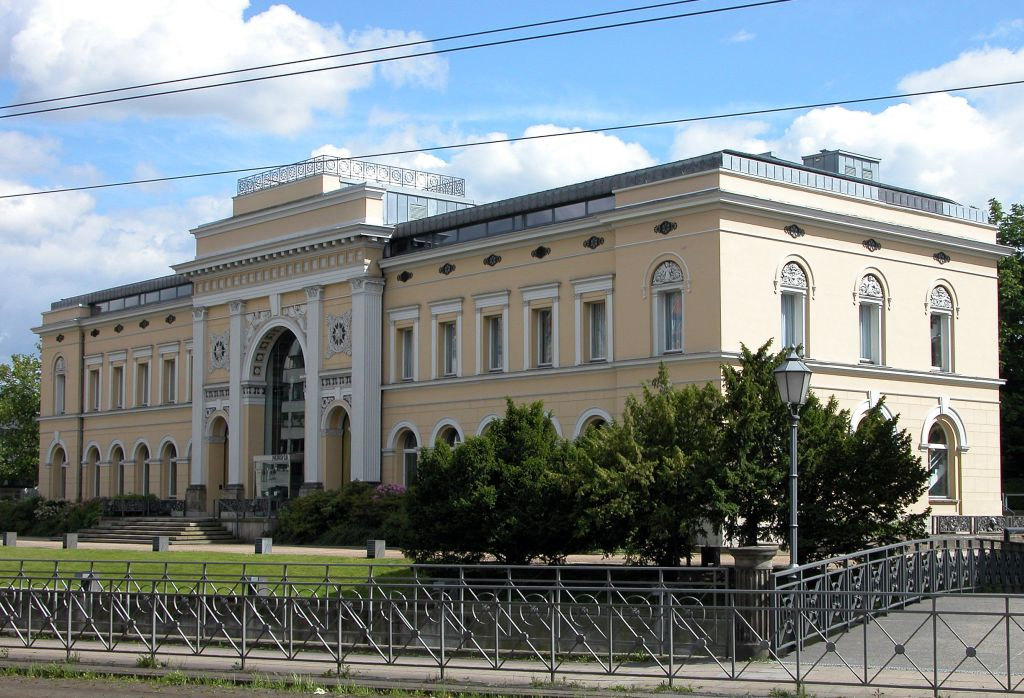
The old Braunschweig train station, now the Norddeutsche Landesbank

He was the son of Johann Heinrich Gottfried Ottmer (1767–1814), a surgeon, and his second wife Elisabeth. He began his architectural training in 1816 at the Collegium Carolinum (now the Braunschweig University of Technology) and served an apprenticeship in the building department of the Duchy of Brunswick. He was soon promoted and, from 1817 to 1821, received training from the Senior Architect, Peter Joseph Krahe. In 1822, he went to Berlin for further studies at the Bauakademie, where he was under the direction of Karl Friedrich Schinkel. While there he became good friends with Carl Friedrich Zelter, leader of the Sing-Akademie zu Berlin. This friendship eventually led to the construction of a permanent building for that group.

He later refused an appointment as Court Architect in Berlin and spent the years 1827 to 1829 travelling through France and Italy. Upon his return, he married Cäcilie Abich (1808-1866).

After a major fire virtually destroyed the Brunswick Palace in 1830, he became the Court Architect for Braunschweig. In this capacity, he restored the palace and worked on many administrative, military and public projects.

His last project, the Braunschweiger Bahnhof (train station), could not be completed before his death. Suffering from a lingering illness, he went to Berlin seeking a cure and died there. The station was completed from his plans (now lost) in 1845.

== Major projects ==
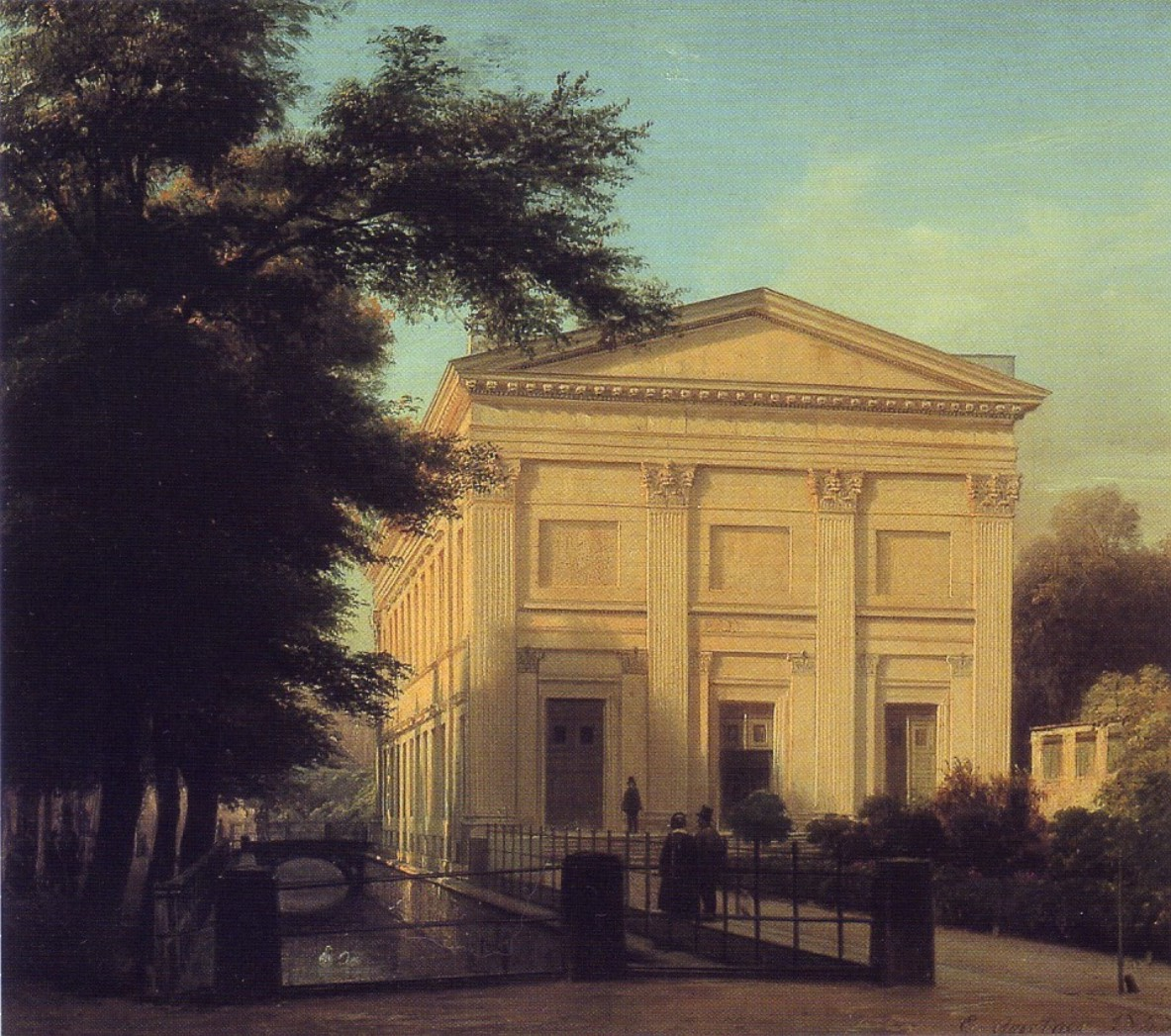
Berlin Singakademie. Painting by Eduard Gaertner (1843)

- 1823–1824: Berlin, Königsstädtisches Theater on the Alexanderplatz. (Demolished in 1932)
- 1825–1827: Berlin, Berliner Singakademie, in consultation with Karl Friedrich Schinkel. Since 1952, it has been known as the Maxim Gorki Theatre.
- 1829–1831: Meiningen, Herzogliches Hoftheater. (Destroyed by fire in 1908)
- 1830–1838: Braunschweig, Brunswick Palace. (Severely damaged in World War II. Demolished and partially rebuilt in 1960. Façade reconstructed in 2006/2007 using salvaged parts)
- 1835: Wolfenbüttel, Theater in the Schloß Wolfenbüttel. (Closed in 1903, later converted into classrooms)
- 1838–1841: Fallersleben infantry barracks. (in Florentine style)
- 1839: Braunschweig: Villa von Bülow, now home to the Georg-Eckert-Institut für internationale Schulbuchforschung (Georg Eckert Institute for International Textbook Research)
