= Adele Muzzarelli =

Italian soprano, soubrette and dancer

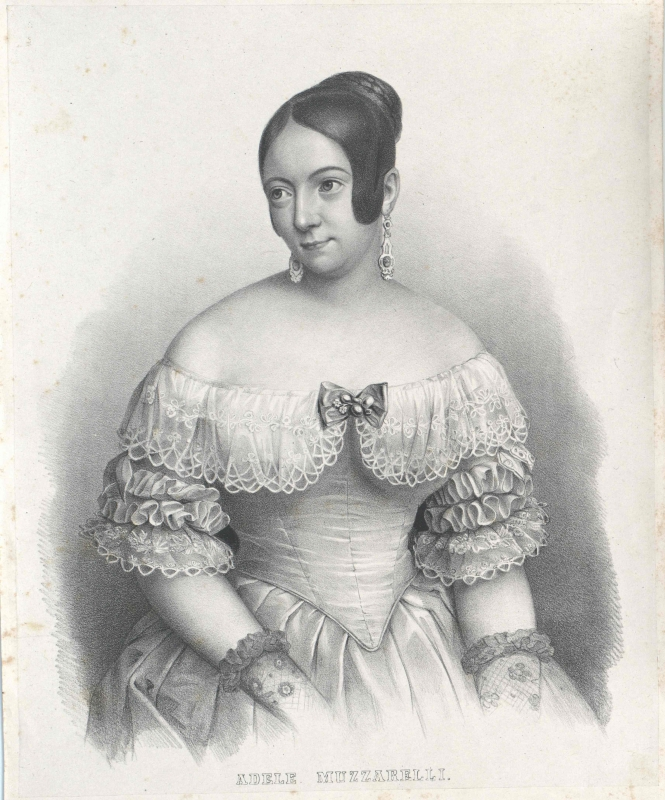
Adele Muzzarelli Beckmann

Adele Muzzarelli Beckmann (4 June 1816, Venice – 3 November 1885, Batignolles) was an Italian soprano, soubrette and dancer. She is the founder of Friedrich Beckmann Foundation.

== Life ==
Adele Muzzarelli was born on 4 June 1816 in Venice. Her grandfather was a ballet master at the Vienna Opera under Emperor Joseph II, her father was the Italian tenor Muzzarelli, and her mother was a Prima ballerina at the Teatro La Fenice in Venice. Her father died when she was two years old and she moved to Vienna with her mother. In Vienna Muzzarelli received vocal training from Giuseppe Ciccimarra. She was a chorister at the Theater am Kärntnertor in Vienna.

== Career ==
In 1830, Muzzarelli debuted at the Brno Theater as Zerlina in Don Giovanni. She stayed in Brno until 1832, where she played roles like Rosina in The Barber of Seville, the title role in Semiramide by Rossini and Isolde in Der Vampyr (Lindpaintner).

In 1832, she accepted an engagement at the German Opera House in Budapest, but then lost her voice. After taking a break for some time, she performed soubrette roles first at the Carltheater Vienna, then at the Königstädtisches Theater Berlin.

In 1838, Muzzarelli married a comedian Friedrich Beckmann whom she met at the Königstädtisches Theater in Berlin. In 1845, Muzzarelli-Beckmann retired from the stage and followed her husband to Vienna. After her husband's death in 1866 she left Vienna and lived mostly in France.

Muzzarelli-Beckmann founded the Friedrich Beckmann Foundation, aimed to provide aid to German actors and actresses in financial difficulties.

Adele Muzzarelli-Beckman died on 3 November 1885 in Batignolles, France.
