= Johann Baptist Sigl =

German journalist (1839–1901)

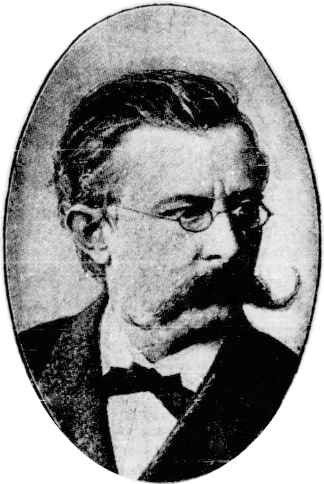

Member of the Reichstag
- In office 1893–1899
- Constituency: 6th Lower Bavarian electoral district (Kelheim)

Member of the Landtag of Bavaria
- In office 1897–1899

Personal details
- Born: 27 March 1839 Ascholtshausen, Kingdom of Bavaria
- Died: 9 January 1902 (aged 62) Munich, Kingdom of Bavaria, German Empire
- Occupation: Journalist, publicist, politician

Johann Baptist Sigl (27 March 1839 – 9 January 1902) was a Bavarian journalist, publicist and politician. He was a co-founder of the Bavarian Peasants' League and a member of the Reichstag and the Landtag of Bavaria. He also founded the Catholic-Bavarian newspaper Das Bayerische Vaterland in 1869.

== Life and political career ==
Sigl was born on 27 March 1839 in Ascholtshausen, in what is now a part of Mallersdorf-Pfaffenberg in Lower Bavaria. He went to school in Landshut in 1848 and began his studies in philosophy and theology at the Ludwig-Maximilians-Universität München in 1858 before switching to jurisprudence. In 1862/63 he entered the St. Boniface's Abbey in Munich but left the monastery after four months.

He founded the Katholische Volkspartei (Catholic Peoples Party) in 1871, but it was dissolved three years later. In 1892, he worked with Georg Ratzinger to found the Bavarian Peasants' League; his newspaper, the Bayerische Vaterland, become the official newspaper of the League. In 1893, he was elected to the Reichstag where he was a member until 1899 for the 6th Lower Bavarian electoral district of Kelheim. Sigl was not a member of any party while a member of the Reichstag. He became a member of the Landtag of Bavaria in 1893 as well, serving until 1899. After the death of the Peasants' League's Jakob Penn, he became a member of the Landtag's fourth department.

Sigl died on 9 January 1902 in Munich.

== Journalism career ==
Thanks to the Catholic bishop Daniel Bonifacius von Haneberg, the abbot of St. Boniface's Abbey, he met the publicist and politician Josef Edmund Jörg. Thanks to Jörg, he worked for the Volksbote für den Bürger und Landmann and the Straubinger Tagblatt in 1865 before becoming a war correspondent in Bohemia in 1866.

On 1 April 1869, he founded his own Catholic-Bavarian newspaper, Das Bayerische Vaterland, which soon became known and popular in the Kingdom of Bavaria for its open criticism of the Chancellor of Germany and the German Empire's policies. As such, the newspaper also focused on anti-Prussian reporting, warning people of Prussian militancy and a "black-white-red empire". Due to the high cost of the Franco-Prussian War of 1870–71 he called the new German Empire's crown a "bigger Prussian Pickelhaube". His reporting and insults of Otto von Bismarck resulted in a ten-month prison sentence in 1875. In 1878, he received another three-month prison sentence after calling the German emperor the "Prussian king" and calling his empire a plague. In 1884, he was again on trial for claiming that the Bavarian War Ministry was simply a relay station for orders from Berlin. He was sentenced to nine months imprisonment but was able to force the ministry to prove its role and procedures at great length.

Other enemies of Sigl were liberal politicians such as Chlodwig, Prince of Hohenlohe-Schillingsfürst, who was Prime Minister of Bavaria from 1866 to 1870, as well as the liberal rival newspaper, the Münchner Neueste Nachrichten. In 1879, the Catholic diocese of Munich called for the newspaper to be boycotted after Sigl attacked the new archbishop Antonius von Steichele. Sigl also lost the right to collect Peter's Pence.

Sigl was also one of the foremost defenders of Munich-based confidence trickster Adele Spitzeder, tapping into the widespread antisemitism of the times to characterize criticism of Spitzeder, mainly by the Münchner Neueste Nachrichten, as attempts by the "Jewish capital" against both its readers and Spitzeder, whom he lauded as a pious Catholic woman. While Spitzeder was known for bribing newspaper editors to report favorably on her business dealings, Sigl was so convinced that he was the only one who received no money from Spitzeder in return.

The newspaper survived Sigl's death but lost much of its influence and its status as the Peasants' League's official newspaper. It became the newspaper of choice for the right wing of the Bavarian People's Party (BVP) after World War I but fought against Adolf Hitler because they felt he was a threat to Bavaria's independence, leading to the newspaper's prohibition in 1934. Attempts to reintroduce a new Das Bayerische Vaterland in 1962 were short-lived and ended in June 1969.
