= Maxim Gorki Theater =

Theatre in Berlin

- Berliner Singakademie (before 1952)
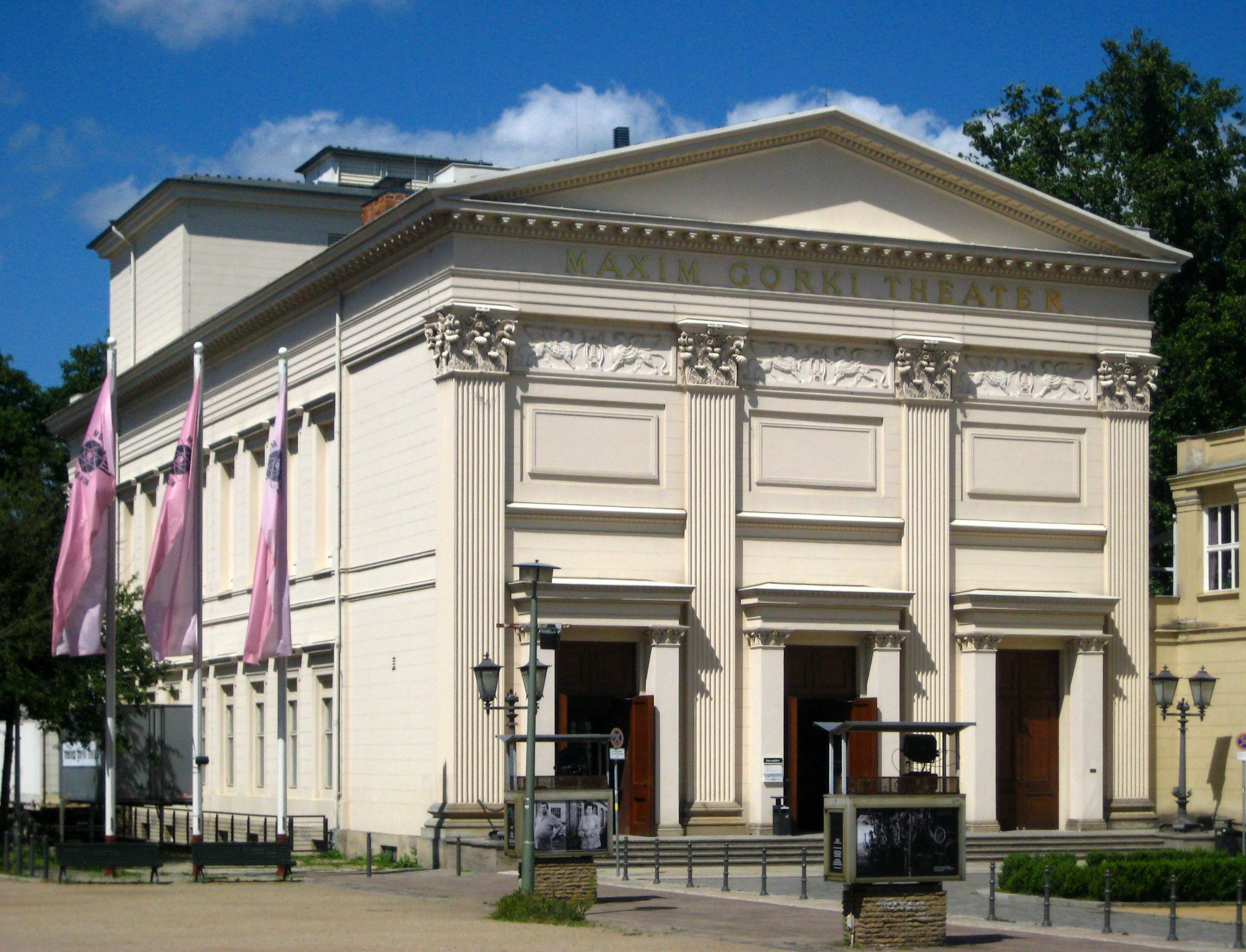
- The Maxim Gorki Theater
- Interactive map of Maxim Gorki Theater
- Address: Berlin, Dorotheenstadt; Germany
- Coordinates: 52°31′08″N 13°23′43″E
- Capacity: 440

Construction
- Opened: 1827
- Years active: 1827–present
- Architects: Karl Friedrich Schinkel and Carl Theodor Ottmer

Website
- www.gorki.de

The Maxim Gorki Theater is a theatre in Berlin-Mitte named after the Soviet writer Maxim Gorky. In 2012, the Mayor of Berlin Klaus Wowereit named Şermin Langhoff as the artist director of the theatre.

== History ==
It is the oldest concert hall building in Berlin. The building was built on behalf of the Sing-Akademie zu Berlin, which was founded by Carl Friedrich Christian Fasch in 1791. In the years between 1825 and 1827, under its former director Carl Friedrich Zelter, he set up his own concert hall and his own home. Design and execution were done by junior architect Carl Theodor Ottmer, using plans of the architect Karl Friedrich Schinkel in the classical style.

Between 1827 and 1828, Alexander von Humboldt gave his Cosmos lectures here. On March 11, 1829, the first performance of a revival of St Matthew Passion by JS Bach performed by the Sing Academy under the direction of Felix Mendelssohn. In the summer of 1848, the building was used as the venue of the Prussian National Assembly.

During the Second World War, the building was badly damaged stopping performances of Sing-Akademie. After that, the Soviet occupying forces confiscated the building and used it in 1947 as a theater house of the neighboring "House(s) of the culture of the Soviet Union" (the present Palais am Festungsgraben).

In response to Brecht's Epic Theater in Berlin Ensemble Theater in 1949. Sing-Akademie in 1952 was renamed the Maxim Gorki Theater, "as a place for the care of Russian and Soviet theater art". As a sozialistisches Modelltheater (a socialist model theatre). It was founded under its first director, a Stanislavsky student Maxim Vallentin, a committed socialist realist. The originally planned opening of the theater with Maxim Gorky's Night Asylum (also known as The Lower Depths) was stopped by the State Art Commission. Instead, the building opened on 30 October 1952, with the German premiere of the Soviet piece Für die auf See (For those at sea) by Boris Lawrence.

Then at the end of the 1950s (also under the impression of the uprisings in the GDR, in Poland and in Hungary) there were performances of such pieces as Alfred Matusche's Naked Grass and Heiner Müller's Die Korrektur (The Correction) and Der Lohndrücker (The Scab) both in 1958. Heiner Müller was employed at that time as a dramatist.

The GDR premiere of Volker Braun's Die Übergangsgesellschaft (The Transitional Society}, directed by Thomas Langhoff, caused a sensation in 1988.

The 1980s also had performances by Thomas Langhoff's (Chekhov's Three Sisters) and Shakespeare's A Midsummer Night's Dream.

After the reunification, between 1990 and 2012, a very complex legal dispute was fought between the Sing-Akademie and the Land Berlin, both on administrative (restitution) and civil law (correction of the land register entry) around the building and its parcels. After the administrative court of Berlin had decided in favor of the choir in 2004. However, the dispute was not settled.

On 7 July 2011, contrary to the previous opinion of the Administrative Court and the Landgericht, the Berlin Court of Appeal ruled that the land was effectively expropriated, leaving the house initially owned by the State of Berlin. The Landgericht had expressly left open whether the Land of Berlin would have to return the land to the Sing-Akademie by way of restitution under Property Law, as it had nothing to decide about it. On 7 December 2012, its judgment decided Bundesgerichtshof that the building with the property was not effectively expropriated and thus still owned by the Sing-Akademie, so that the defendant country Berlin has to contribute to the correction of the Land Register and must agree that the Sing-Akademie zu Berlin is the owner in the land register as registered. As a result, the state of Berlin, the building official for the Maxim Gorki Theater and signed a ground lease agreement for 25 years, which provides for annual rent of each €315,000.

=== Intendants (general directors) ===
1952–1968	1968–1994	1994–2001	2001–2006	2006–2013	ab 2013/14
Maxim Vallentin	Albert Hetterle	Bernd Wilms	Volker Hesse	Armin Petras	Shermin Langhoff and Jens Hillje

== Awards ==
- 2014 and 2016: Theater of the Year
- 2015: Theater Prize of the Federal Government, €80,000
- 2016: Theater Prize Berlin, €20,000, for the directors Shermin Langhoff and Jens Hillje . In the jury's statement, it was said that since the 2013/2014 season, the duo have "consistently and radically transformed the Maxim Gorki Theater into a venue that reflects the diversity of the city's population."

=== Festival awards ===
- 2022: Theatertreffen with Slippery Slope Almost a Musical written by Yael Ronen, Shlomi Shabban, Riah Knight and Itai Reicher. Music direction and score by Yaniv Fridel and Ofer Shabi at Soho Sonic Studios

== Sources ==
- Applegate, Celia: Bach in Berlin: Nation and Culture in Mendelssohn's Revival of the St. Matthew Passion. Ithaca, London: Cornell University Press, 2005.

== Bibliography ==
- 50 years Maxim Gorki Theater Berlin – 50 years and no end . Theater of Time, 2002, ISBN 3-934344-19-4 .
- Heinrich Trost, Author Collective: The Building and Art Monuments in the GDR – Capital Berlin I. Institute for the Preservation of Monuments. Henschelverlag, Berlin 1983.
- Georg Dehio u. a .: Handbook of German Art Monuments, Berlin. Deutscher Kunstverlag, Munich 1994. ISBN 3-422-03038-7
- Rolf Hosfeld: Berlin cultural seducer. Helmut Metz, Hamburg 2005, ISBN 3-937742-02-6 .
- The counter-foundation . In: Berliner Zeitung, October 30, 2002; on the 50th anniversary of the founding of the theater
- Nola, Claudia / Schultze, Arved (ed.): Open Bills. Intendanz Armin Petras – Maxim Gorki Theater Berlin, Theater of Time, Berlin 2013, ISBN 978-3-943881-32-5
