= Friedrich Kaiser =

Austrian playwright

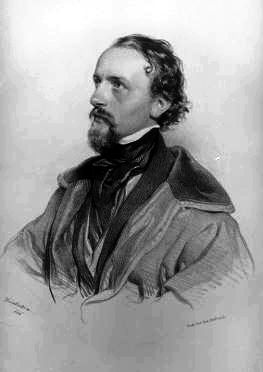
- Lithograph of Kaiser by Josef Kriehuber
- Born: 3 April 1814; Biberach an der Riß, Kingdom of Württemberg
- Died: 6 October 1874 (aged 60); Vienna, Cisleithania

Friedrich Kaiser (3 April 1814, Biberach - 6 November 1874, Vienna) was an Austrian playwright.

== Biography ==
During his youth he was one of the most popular people in Vienna. Some of his plays were "Hans Hasenkopf" (1835); "Wer wird Amtmann" (1840), "Palais und Irrenhaus" (1863), "Des Krämers Töchterlein" (1862), "Pater Abraham a Sancta Clara" as well as many others. He also wrote the historical novel "Ein Plaffenfeben."

== Works ==
Autobiography

- Unter fünfzehn Theater-Directoren. Bunte Bilder aus der Wiener Bühnenwelt. Wien, R.v.Waldheim, 1870

Biography

- Theaterdirektor Carl. 1854.
- Friedrich Beckmann. 1866.

Novels

- Ein Pfaffenleben. 1871.
- Kaiser Josef. 1874.
- Unter dem alten Fritz. 1874.

Theatre

- Das Rendezvous. 1834.
- Wolf und Braut. 1836.
- Dienstbotenwirtschaft oder Schatulle und Uhr. 1840.
- Geld. 1841.
- Der Schneider als Naturdichter. 1843.
- Die Industrie-Ausstellung. 1845.
- Der Rastelbinder oder 1000 Gulden. 1850.
- Pater Abraham a Sancta Clara. 1870.
