= Johann Baptist Placht =

Johann Baptist Placht was an Austrian soldier, clerk and confidence trickster who was indicted in 1874 for running a Ponzi scheme in 19th-century Vienna.

== Early life ==
Placht's birth date and place are unknown. Since he was 36 years old at the time of his trial on 10 February 1874, he must have been born in 1837 or 1838.

Placht was originally a soldier in the rank of an officer in the "Freiherr von Ramming" infantry regiment of the Austro-Hungarian Army. He had to quit the service because of his debt and was hired as a clerk at a bank in Vienna. Shortly after he started working at the bank, numerous bonds went missing. Despite multiple reasonable grounds for suspecting Placht of the theft, his guilt could not be proven and he was instead fired with a severance.

== Business dealings ==
In the first half of 1872, Placht began advertising his business in all major newspapers, promising investors cheap rates for orders of securities. By June, he invited customers to deposit at least 500 florins with his "Börsen-Comptoir" which he promised to invest at no risk to the customers and claiming that he had been able to make 15% profit for other customers. By November, he increased his claim to 20%. Placht never invested any money but used the investments to further his gambling addiction.

After being able to keep up the charade for several months by paying out old customers with the investments of new customers, his business fell apart when the stock market crashed in May of 1873 and his trades were largely fictitious. On 18 May 1873, bankruptcy proceedings were initiated. At this time, his liabilities measured 2,820,346 florins and 29 franks with assets worth only approximately 12,000 florins. Placht himself had not documented his use of the funds and kept no records.

On 10 February 1874, at age 36, he was sentenced to six years in prison on charges of fraud and embezzlement. The gullibility and greed of his customers was emphasized as a mitigating factor by both the prosecutor and the judge as well as the stock market crash. He was incarcerated in a prison in Stein (Krems an der Donau). In September 1877, he was pardoned by the emperor. After his release, his further life is not documented.

== Similar cases ==
Contemporary reports on the trial pointed to similarities to the case of Adele Spitzeder, who had run a similar business in Munich until November 1872; Spitzeder, however, unlike Placht, never claimed to invest the money people gave her or in fact explained how she intended to make a profit at all. In both cases, the customers were mainly from the lower classes of society.
