= Josef Spitzeder =

German actor and singer (c.1795–1832)

- Born: c. 1795; Germany
- Died: 13 December 1832 (aged 36–37); Munich, Germany
- Occupations: Actor; Operatic bass
- Spouse(s): Henriette Spitzeder (m. 1816–1828) Betty Vio (m. 1831–1832)
- Children: 7, including Adele

Johann Josef Spitzeder (c. 1795 – 13 December 1832) was a German actor and singer. He was the father of con artist and actress Adele Spitzeder.

Spitzeder's year and place of birth are unclear. According to the Austrian Biographical Lexicon 1815–1950, he was born on 2 September 1794, in Bonn. His entry in the Allgemeine Deutsche Biographie quotes a contemporary source as saying that he was born in 1795, similarly in Bonn, while the Directory of German Biography gives his birth year as 1796 and his place of birth as Kassel.

Spitzeder was educated by composer Joseph Weigl in Vienna, where in 1816, he got his start as an opera singer. Also in 1816, he married Henriette Spitzeder (née Schüler), a soprano, at the Königsstädtisches Theater in Berlin. Both were hired together in 1819 to play at the Theater an der Wien, where Spitzeder excelled in buffa roles. They had six children together, with her dting during a childbirth in 1828. In 1831, he married Betty Vio, an opera singer he met in Berlin. They too married at the Königsstädtisches Theater. They had one child, Adele, who later became an actress and con artist. He them performed at the National Theatre, which was received positively. Ludwig I of Bavaria offered an annual salary of 6,000 gulden for a permanent position at the National Theatre. He died on 13 December 1832, aged around 36 or 37, in Munich, shortly after being called to work at the Bavarian State Opera.
