= Straubinger Tagblatt =

- Founded: 1 October 1860
- Language: German
- Headquarters: Straubing, Germany
- OCLC number: 724498713

Straubinger Tagblatt is a German language newspaper published in Straubing, Germany. It was founded in 1860 and its first editor was Cl. Attenkofer.
