= Şermin Langhoff =

Turco-German theatre director

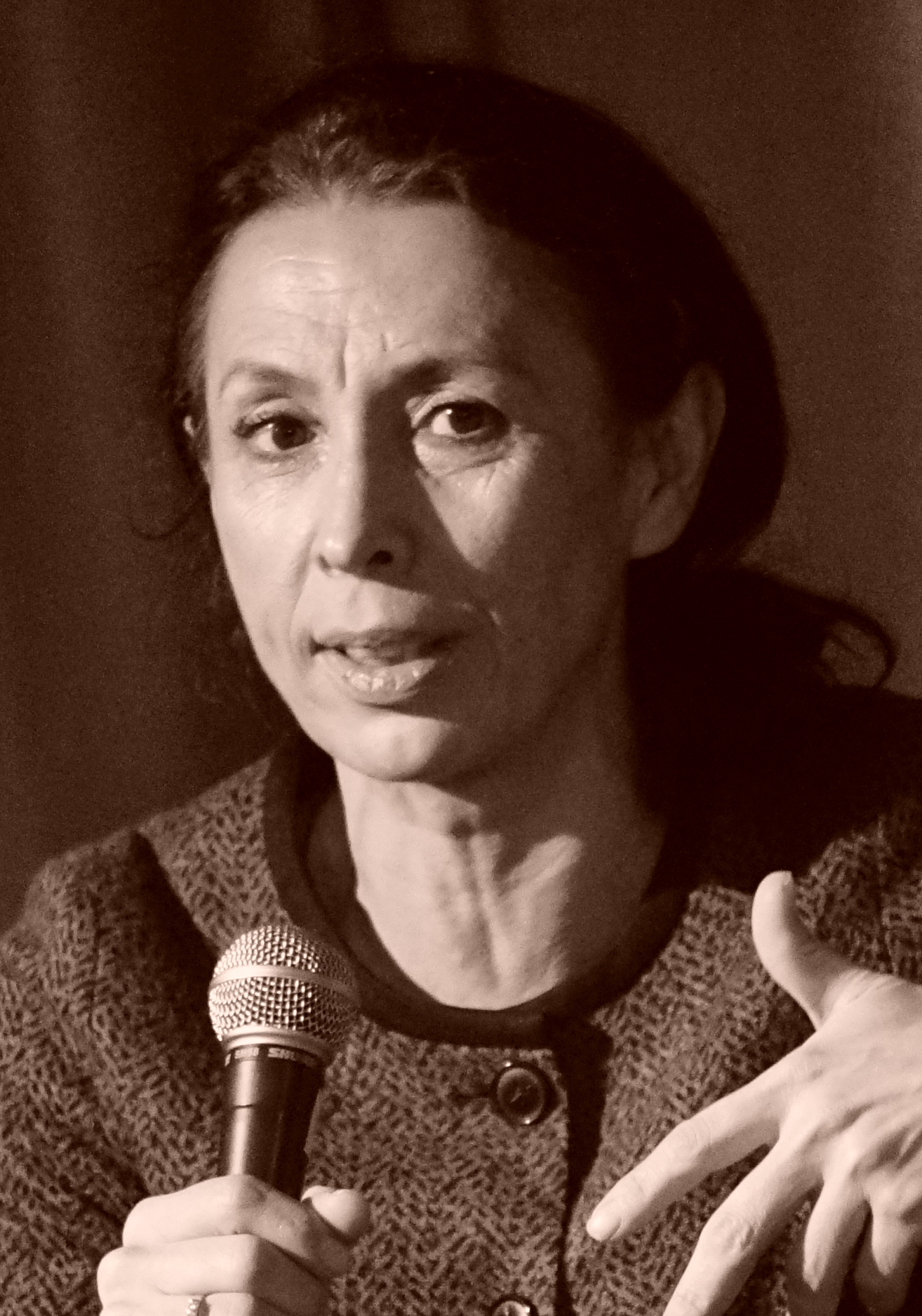
2017

Şermin Langhoff (born in 1969) theater producer based in Germany who immigrated from Turkey as a child. She was director of the Maxim Gorki Theater from 2013 to 2026.
