= Königsstädtisches Theater =

Name of several theaters in Berlin Germany

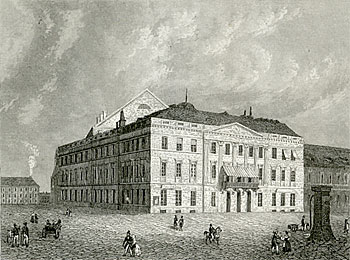
- First Königsstädtisches Theater
- Interactive map of the Königsstädtisches Theater area

General information
- Location: Berlin
- Coordinates: 52°31′13″N 13°24′56″E
- Opened: 1824
- Closed: 1851
- Demolished: 1932

Design and construction
- Architect: Carl Theodor Ottmer

Königsstädtisches Theater was the name of different theater buildings in Berlin in the 19th and 20th century.

The first Königsstädtisches Theater was built by Carl Theodor Ottmer in Königsstadt, a former settlement neighboring Berlin that is today part of the boroughs of Mitte, Prenzlauer Berg and Friedrichshain, and opened in 1824. Its first director was Karl Friedrich Cerf, who managed it until his death in 1845. An Aktiengesellschaft from its inception, the theater had to rely on financial support by the King of Prussia. When the monarchy stopped its support in 1840, the theater fell on hard times. Involvement in the German revolutions of 1848–49 meant that the theater was closed in 1851 by royal decree.

Cerf's son, Rudolf Cerf, had inherited the license and the name from his father, and named the building used by Circus Renz "Königsstädtisches Theater" from 1852 to 1854. The license then was sold to Franz Wallner, a popular actor, who used the name for his own Wallner-Theater until 1858. In the following years, a number of different theaters used the name but none achieved any lasting success.

The original theater building was used for various purposes after its closure. It was demolished in 1932.

== Cited sources ==
- Freydank, Ruth (1998). "Hier wurde Nante geboren: Die Geschichte des Königsstädtischen Theaters". Berlinische Monatsschrift (in German). 10.
