= Franz Hoppé =

German actor and operatic baritone

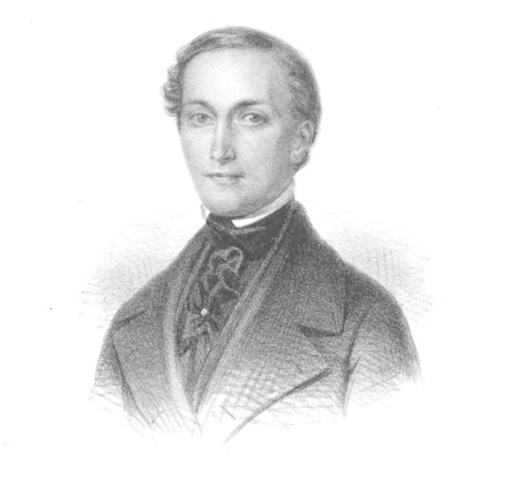
Franz Hoppé

Franz Hoppé, also Franz Hoppe (1810 – 5 or 6. July 1849), was a German actor and operatic baritone.

== Life ==
According to Joseph Kürschner, Hoppé, born in St. Petersburg, son of the actor Georg Christoph Hoppe, who had gone to Germany after an engagement at the St. Petersburg Court Theatre, spent some time in Paris "pursuing musical studies".Joseph Kürschner (1881). "Hoppé, Franz" . Allgemeine Deutsche Biographie (in German). Vol. 13. Leipzig: Duncker & Humblot. p. 114. A biographical sketch which appeared in the Hamburger Zeitung, among others, reports in somewhat greater detail the anecdote that Hoppé had indeed entered the conservatoire to take the entrance examination for piano studies, but on this occasion had heard a small boy play so perfectly, he returned to his native city "rather saddened and completely at a loss", where he finally set his sights on a musical career and began to "cultivate the horn". He then went back to Paris and actually began training as a French horn player at the conservatoire. According to this account of his life, however, his success was rather moderate, so that Hoppé switched to pharmacy and finally returned to St. Petersburg once again.

In the early 1830s, however, he turned to a singing and stage career and initially received engagements at smaller and medium-sized stages, including in Riga. While he had initially worked as an opera singer, he concentrated entirely on acting from his time in Düsseldorf. After an engagement in Cologne, he moved to the Hamburg State Opera in 1838, where he won the title role in Karl Töpfer's play Der reiche Mann. In 1842, he received an engagement in Braunschweig and in 1844 he moved to the Schauspielhaus Berlin, his last place of work.

In Braunschweig, he actually had a lifetime appointment and apparently disappeared very suddenly the day before a performance of Faust. Hoppé, already suffering severely from "consumption fever", had his last performance on 22 June 1849 as Marinelli in Emilia Galotti. Two days earlier a son had been born to him.

At the time, Hoppé was married for the second time. His second wife, whom he married on 28 September 1848, was Clara Stich, a daughter of the actor couple Auguste Crelinger and Wilhelm Heinrich Stich. She married the singer Theodor Liedtcke in her second marriage.

His first wife, whom he had married in London and who had also been an actress, had borne him three children, but succumbed to "incurable insanity", and had been divorced by Hoppé and taken to an asylum.

Death announcement

Hoppé died in Berlin in 1849 at the age of only 39 and was buried in the St.-Hedwig-Friedhof on Liesenstraße. The gravestone is not preserved. His successor at the Berlin stage was Ludwig Dessoir.

Kürschner described Hoppé as one of the most usable actors on the Berlin stage and wrote of him: "Hoppé's talent was characterised by the avoidance of everything abrupt and unattractive, by the emphasis on the smooth, moderate [...]" He lacked the demonic quality of a Franz Moor or Mephistopheles, whereas he showed his strengths in roles such as Geßler, Nathan and Dorfrichter Adam.Joseph Kürschner (1881). "Hoppé, Franz" . Allgemeine Deutsche Biographie (in German). Vol. 13. Leipzig: Duncker & Humblot. p. 114.
