= The Consecration of the House (overture) =

Overture by Ludwig van Beethoven

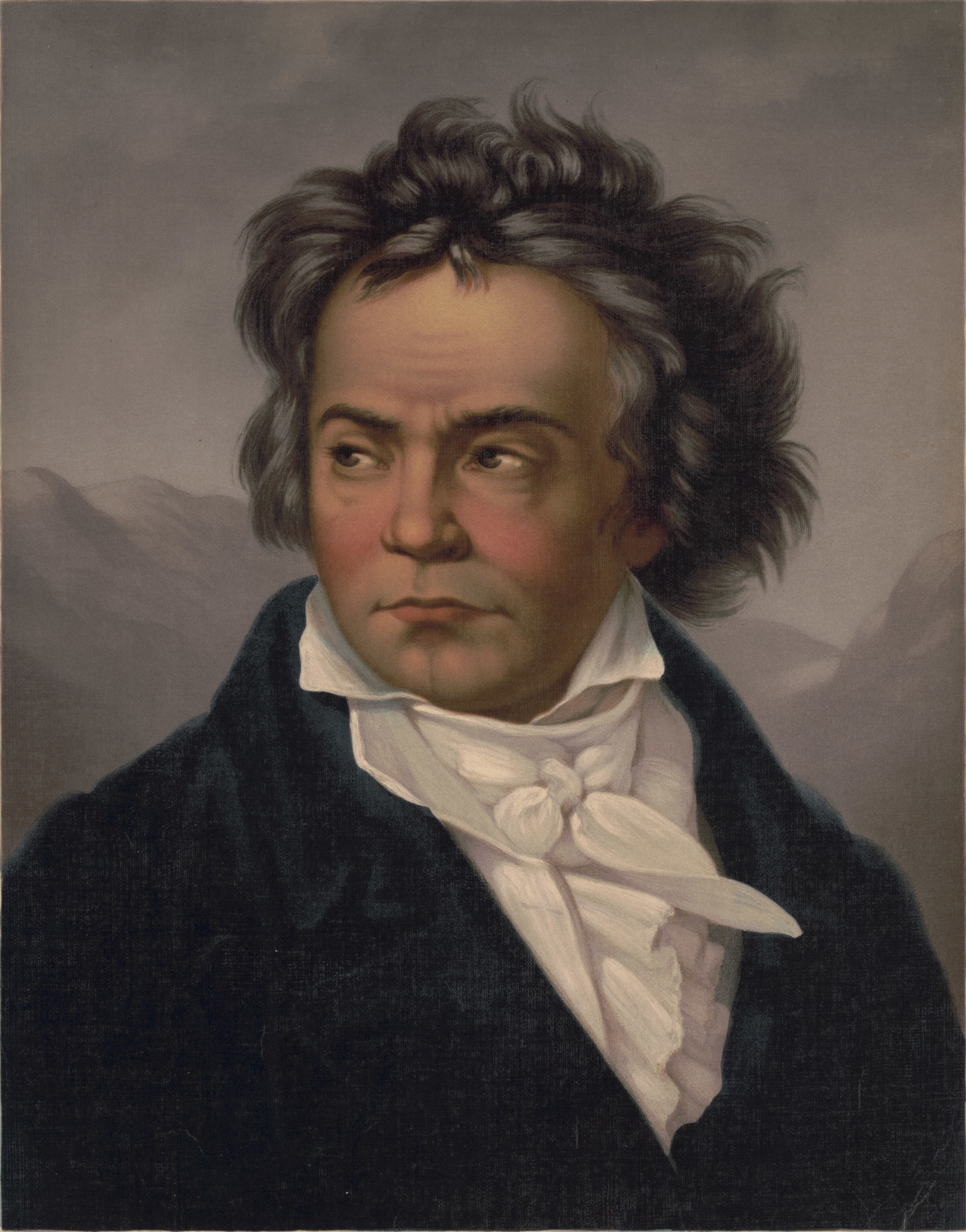
Ludwig van Beethoven (age 48) depicted in a portrait by Ferdinand Schimon (1819)

The Consecration of the House (German: Die Weihe des Hauses), Op. 124, is a work by Ludwig van Beethoven composed in September 1822. It was commissioned by Carl Friedrich Hensler, the Director of Vienna's new Theater in der Josefstadt, and was first performed at the theatre's opening on October 3, 1822. It was the first work Beethoven wrote after his revival of studying the works of J. S. Bach and Handel, and bears their influence.

The Consecration of the House overture was also the first item on the program at Beethoven's 7 May 1824 concert at Vienna's Theater am Kärntnertor, where the world premiere of his 9th Symphony took place.

== Composition history ==
Previously, in 1811, Beethoven had written The Ruins of Athens (Die Ruinen von Athen), Op. 113, incidental music for August von Kotzebue's play of the same name, for the dedication of a new theatre in Pest. This same work was to be performed again in 1822 for the new theatre in Vienna. However, Carl Meisl, the commissioner of the Royal Imperial Navy, changed the texts of numbers 1, 6, 7, and 8 of Beethoven's work. Beethoven was not pleased with the revision, and felt that the new text did not fit the music. Meisl also introduced a section, Wo sich die Pulse, for which Beethoven wrote new music (WoO 98). Beethoven wrote a completely new overture for the work, altered some of the musical numbers, and added others, including a final chorus with violin solo and ballet. This new overture is known as The Consecration of the House Overture. (The extra incidental pieces constitute the entire work.)

In an anecdote from Beethoven's biographer Anton Schindler, the two were on a walk during the composer's health trip to Baden when he stopped to write down two themes for the overture. The influence of Handel on this specific work is displayed in a recount of the conversation by Schindler: "He explained that he planned to develop one of them [the themes] freely, and the other in the formal style of Handel". Musically, the 'free development' isn't blatantly prevalent, but the influences from Handel are evident in the fugato theme of the allegro section (albeit with a huge amount of Beethoven's own invention characterizing it as well). In 1826, the year before he died, Beethoven had been enthusiastically studying Saul, and wrote to a friend: "In future I shall write in the style of my master Handel one oratorio every year, or a concerto for some string or wind instrument – that is, when I've finished my Tenth Symphony and my Requiem". He composed none of these works (although a hypothetical reconstruction of the Tenth was assembled by Barry Cooper in 1988), but perhaps The Consecration of the House gives us an insight into what these oratorios and other Handelian compositions would have sounded like.

== Structure of the overture ==
An anecdote by Anton Schindler describes Beethoven conceiving two themes for the overture while on a walk, and relates the composer's intention of treating one of these in contrapuntal fashion after Handel. Beethoven chose a monothematic structure, in which a modulation occurs, but in which the new key features the same theme. This suggests the influence of Haydn.

The overture opens with brief isolated chords which herald the beginning of a slow introduction in the manner of Handel. A slow march ensues, processional in character, as if heard in the distance. The brass and winds take over the theme and are joined by the strings for a repeat of the march. As the imaginary procession approaches, the march intensifies, closing with trumpet fanfares and kettle drum announcing the arrival. A trumpet fanfare, with runs in the bassoon, and later the violins, appearing to describe the hurrying and excitement of the crowd, introduces a fast tutti section which seems to signal the main body of the overture, but which instead gives way to a sonata-allegro form. The trumpets and drums resume, leading to an interlude connecting finally with the body of the overture: a fugal Allegro (referred to by Schindler) at the work's centre, in both single and double counterpoint. Different groups of instruments enter in turn, producing a fugal texture. The theme appears in the first violins, flute, and oboe, and a counter theme in the second violins and clarinets. This section crescendos rapidly, and – following the recapitulation – a forceful coda brings the overture to a brilliant close.

== Movements ==
The overture described above, Beethoven's Op. 124, is the first piece in the list below. The other movements are sections that Beethoven wrote, or adapted from his other works, and that come under the umbrella name of this work.

Musik zu Carl Meisls Gelegenheitsfestspiel, Hess 118 [51.19]

(timings taken from a recording, and given as a guide to the relative lengths of the sections)

- Die Weihe des Hauses, Ouvertüre, op. 124 (10.52)
- No. 1 Unsichtbarer Chor. Folge dem mächtigen Ruf der Ehre! (4.05)
- No. 2 Duett. Ohne Verschulden Knechtschaft dulden (3.58)
- No. 3 Chor der Derwische (2.37)
- No. 4 Marcia alla turca (1.39)
- [No. 5] Chor mit Sopran-Solo, WoO 98. Wo sich die Pulse jugendlich jagen. Laßt uns im Tanze (6.03)
- No. 6 Marsch mit Chor, op. 114. Schmückt die Altäre! (6.39)
- No. 7 Musik hinter der Szene [Melodram]. Es wandelt schon das Volk in Feierkleide (Rezitation) (1.45)
- Rezitativ: Mit reger Freude, die nie erkaltet (1.45)
- Chor: Wir tragen empfängliche Herzen im Busen – Arie mit Chor: Will unser Genius noch einen Wunsch (7.58)
- No. 9 Chor: Heil unserm Kaiser! (3.57)
