= Auguste von Bärndorf =

German stage actress

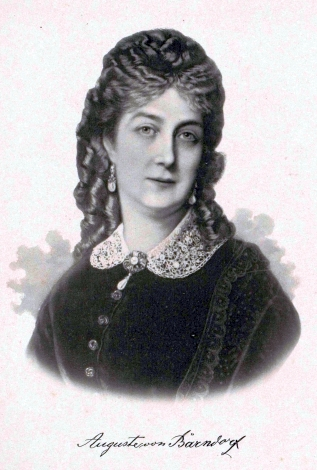
Auguste von Bärndorf, lithograph by Auguste Hüssener

Auguste von Bärndorf (complete name: von Bärndorff von Bauerhorst) (11 March 1823 – 8 March 1911) was a German stage actress.

== Life ==
Born in Berlin, Bärndorff grew up on her parents' estate near Berlin. At the age of 16, after examining her talent and following a letter of recommendation from the actress Charlotte von Hagn, she received acting lessons from Auguste Crelinger. In 1846, she made her debut as Philippine in 100 Years Ago at the Königliches Schauspielhaus Berlin and was subsequently engaged in Oldenburg.

From 1848 to 1857, Bärndorf played as an Imperial Court Actress in Saint Petersburg, then went to Hanover in 1857 and remained there as a leading member of the Court Theatre celebrated actress. From 1868, she appeared only sporadically, taking her stage farewell in 1870.

Bärndorf enjoyed success especially in classical lover roles, but also in comedies. She made guest appearances in Vienna as well as in the US. In 1881, she was made an honorary member of the Staatsoper Hannover.

Bärndorf was a married von Schoultz in her first marriage and in her second marriage to the Prague university lecturer Anton Jaksch Ritter von Wartenhorst. When the latter died in 1887, she lived initially in Baden-Baden, then later in Rome. She died in Rome aged 87 and is buried in the Protestant Cemetery, Rome.

She also trained her niece Auguste Diacono to be an actress.
