= Hammerklavier =

The German word Hammerklavier may refer to:

- The Piano Sonata No. 29 in B flat major, Op. 106 by Ludwig van Beethoven
- A German word for early pianos
- A novel by Yasmina Reza
