= Ida Pellet =

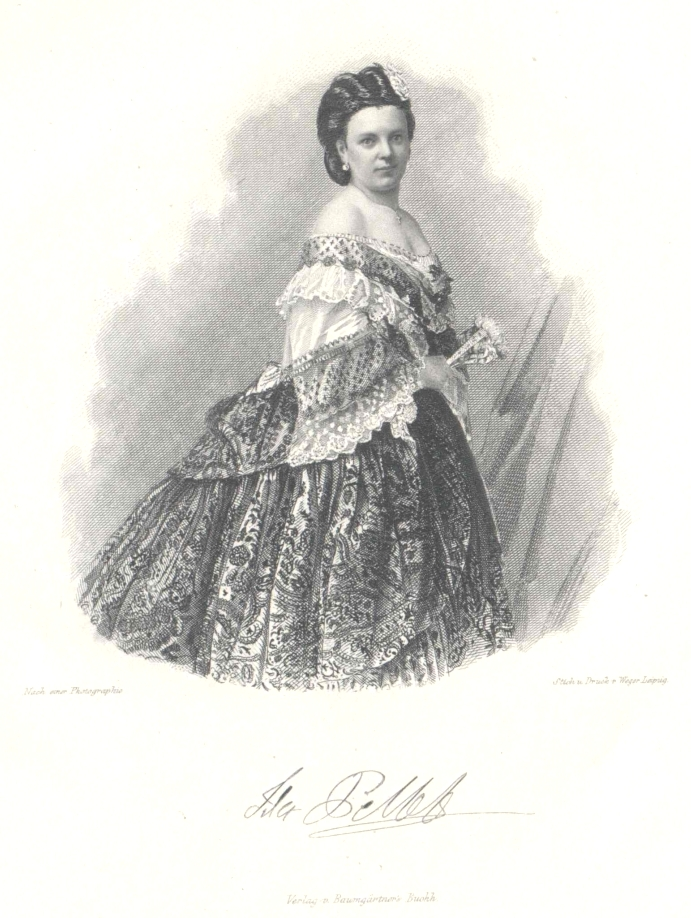

Ida Pellet (1838 - 10 July 1863) was a German classical actress, originally from the Austrian Empire, who died young.

== Life ==
Ida Pellet was probably born in Graz. Reference is also made to sources giving her place of birth as Lemberg or Linz, and it was to Linz where her father, Joseph Pellet, having retired from a successful career as a theatre director in a succession of cities, had retired in order to focus on preparing his daughter for her own stage career. Thanks to her father she was able to make her theatre debut at Nuremberg in 1853, while still a child. She appeared at Linz in 1954, and there were also early appearances at the Carltheater in Vienna.

She spent the next four years at the Stettin Theatre where she worked under the artistic direction of Edgar Hein, especially in respect of conversation pieces, and quickly became a favourite with audiences. In the first part of 1858 she signed up with the Court Theatre in Wiesbaden where for the next three years she concentrated on tragic roles. In November 1859, Lina Fuhr retired from the Berlin Hofbühne Theatre and married an Eye Doctor. In Summer 1860, Ida Pellet made her first appearance at the Hofbühne, at this stage as a guest performer and a competitor for the vacancy left by Miss Fuhr who had been the theatre company's leading tragic heroine. Pellet's successes in "The Maid of Orleans" and other popular classics of the time secured for her a place in the company with effect from September 1861. Other noteworthy performances were as Maria Stuart, Leonore, Gretchen, Jane Eyre, Lorle and Anne Liese, along with Chriemhilde in Hebbel's Nibelungen and Marfa in Heigel's eponymous drama-tragedy.

In Summer 1826 Pellet travelled to Prague for a series of guest performances. In the middle to June she moved on to Leipzig where on 20 June she opened in "The Widow of Lowood" (a drama based on Jane Eyre). She appeared in the same piece each night till 26 June. On 28 June she was due to open in "The Maid of Orleans" and took part in the morning rehearsal. Her appearance that evening was cancelled on account of her sickness, however, and she would never return from her sickbed. Twelve days later, despite attentive nursing in the Hotel Bavière, she died.

== Celebration ==
Karl von Holtei wrote:

Beyond any doubt, Ida Pellet became one of the most professional and talent-filled actresses of modern times. Beauty, grace, affecting gestures, insightful presentation and a magical understanding of language, a vocal resonance that penetrated deep into the heart. Anyone who has seen her in Act 5 of Maria Stuart will agree. She had not yet reached the artistic heights for which she seemed destined. But already she was far along that way in a shining career. Then death quietly destroyed the beautiful youthful being in full bloom.

Ida Pellet ist unzweifelhaft eine der berufensten, talentvollsten Darstellerinnen neuerer Zeit gewesen. Schönheit, Anmut, liebliche Gebärde, Auffassungsgabe und ein Zauber der Sprache, ein Klang der Stimme, der tief zum Herzen drang. Wer sie im 5. Akt der „Maria Stuart“ gesehen, wird beistimmen. Sie war noch nicht auf der höchsten, ihr erreichbaren Stufe der Künstlerschaft. Doch ragte sie schon weit hervor mit feurigem Streben. Da brach der Tod in seiner schleußlichen Gestalt das Schöne, jugendliche Dasein mitten in vollster Blüte.
