= Clara Stich =

German stage actress and singer

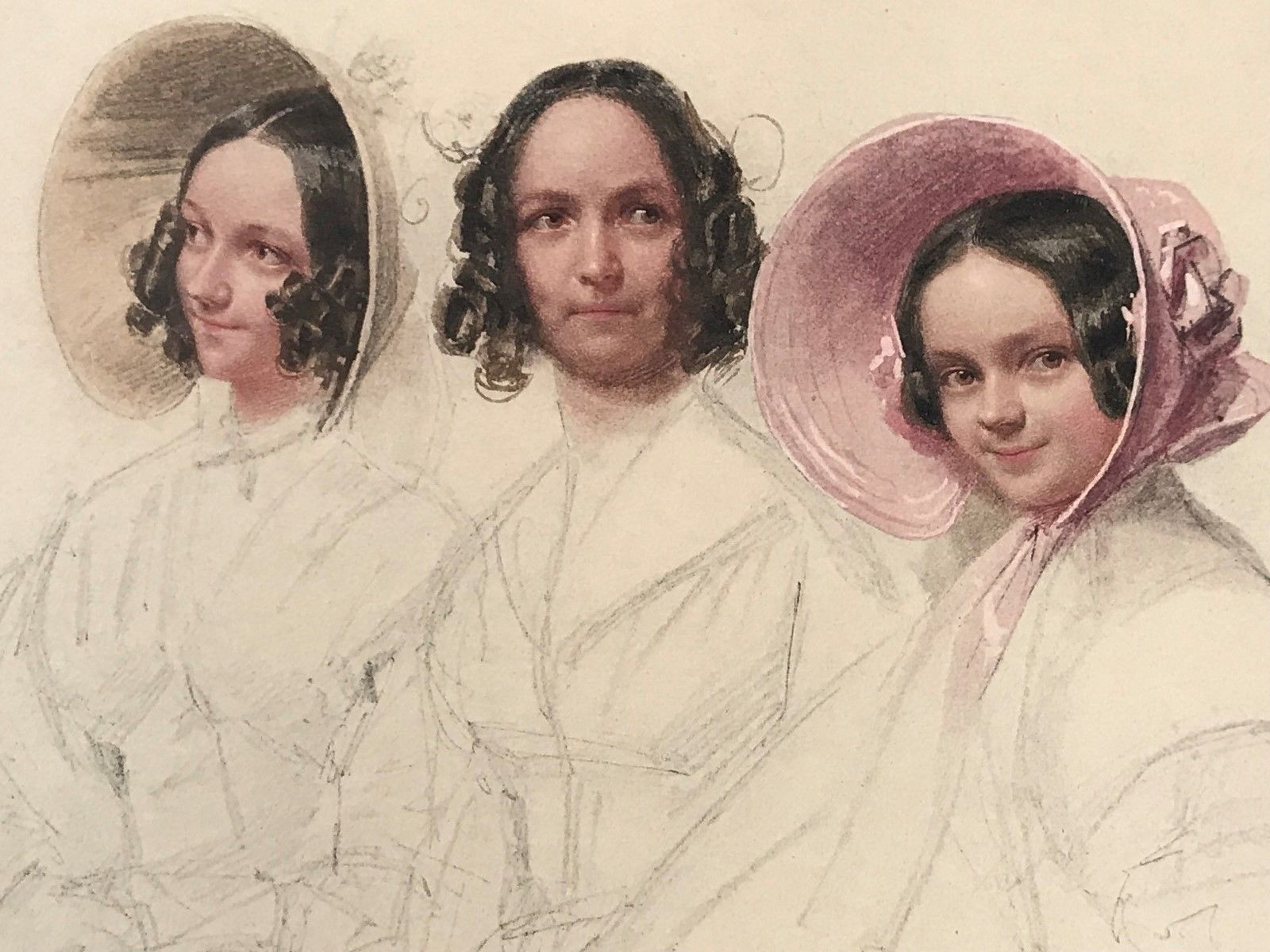
Auguste Crelinger with her daughters (right: Clara Stich), lithograph after Franz Krüger

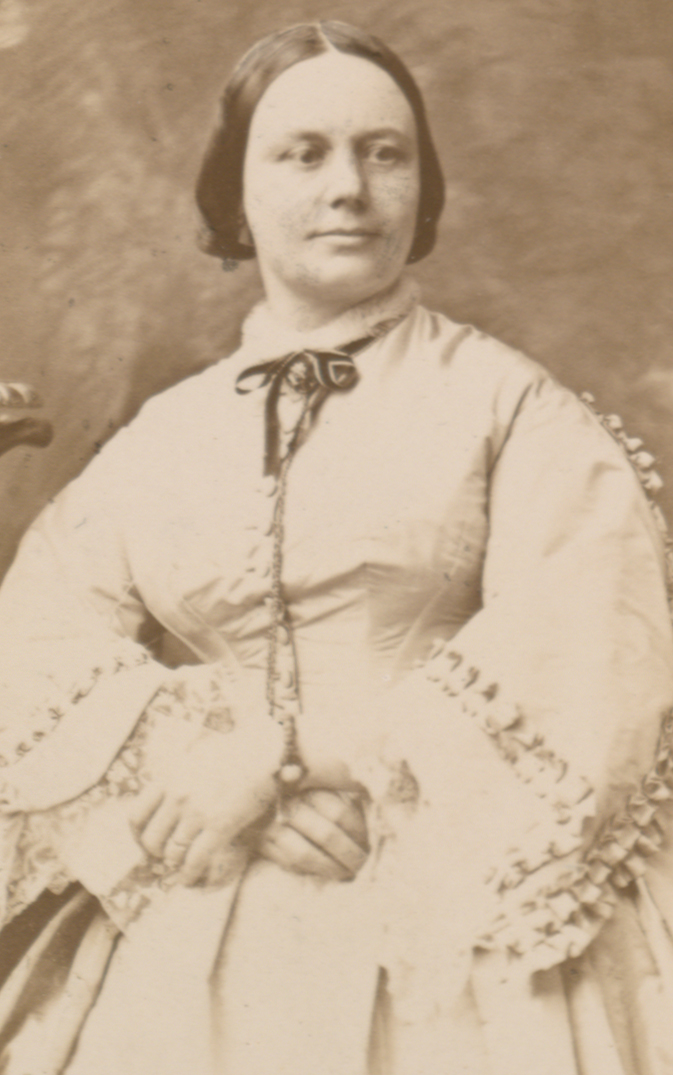
Clara Liedtcke, née Stich, usually Hoppé

Clara Stich, usually Hoppé, married name Liedtcke (24 January 1820 – 1 October 1862), was a German actress and singer.

== Life ==
Born in Berlin, Stich was a child of the first marriage of the actress Auguste Crelinger to the court actor Wilhelm Stich. Her elder sister Bertha was prepared for the profession of an actress from her childhood as well as Clara Stich. The two girls made their first appearance at a concert; Stich sang a duet from Norma with the singer Amalie Haehnel. King Friedrich Wilhelm III supported the family by allowing performances by the young girls at the Königsstädtisches Theater. Stich made her debut there on 6 November 1834 as Elise von Walberg; her mother played the Princess. After a few more performances, the "sharp-eyed monarch" ordered that "both Fräulein Stich be won over for the Königliche Bühne and hired accordingly.".

When she was still fourteen, on 22 January 1835, Stich made her first appearance at the Hofbühne as Das Käthchen von Heilbronn. In April of the same year, Auguste Crelinger took her two daughters to Vienna for a guest performance at the Hofburg, which was very successful. After returning to Berlin, Stich received an engagement as the first youthful naïve lover at the Court Theatre. As she also showed a predisposition for singing, an operatic career was also considered. Stich was then taught by the choral director Elsler and from 1838 was a member of the Sing-Akademie zu Berlin, where she also appeared in solo roles. Carl Blum wrote the little opera Mary, Max and Michel for her. Stich also celebrated triumphs in this singspiel, but then turned away from singing and devoted herself entirely to spoken theatre. She gave guest performances in Breslau, Danzig, Poznań and Königsberg, among other places. Among other roles, she played Melitta in Franz Grillparzer's Sappho. The Stich sisters and their mother made their last joint guest performance trip to Hanover in 1841.

On leave from Berlin for a year, Stich accepted an engagement at the court theatre in Schwerin for 1842. In the following years, she gradually became a rival to the actress Charlotte von Hagn in Berlin. Von Hagn and Stich appeared together on stage in Anna von Österreich and in Das Urbild des Tartüffe, among others. In 1846, Charlotte von Hagn married and retired from the stage; Clara Stich was now mostly entrusted with the tragic love roles that von Hagn had previously played. She is said to have played a Gretchen "such as the public had never seen before and will never see again, not a sentimental little doll; but a girl of flesh and blood, hearty and pithy", a Clärchen, which had been convincing as a "heroine in bourgeois dress", and the model image of a queen in the Don Carlos. Minna von Barnhelm and Emilia Galotti were Stich's other leading roles at this time.

On 24 September 1848, Stich married the divorced court actor Franz Hoppé, who brought three children into the marriage and died after less than a year of marriage. Shortly before her husband's death, Clara Hoppé gave birth to a son. Already on 6 October 1849, she appeared on stage again, first in the role of Desdemona. As the audience's favourite, she was greeted with minutes of applause.

In 1851, the actress fell ill and was replaced by Lina Fuhr. When Clara Hoppé returned to the stage, Fuhr had taken over almost all her previous roles and Hoppé now had to play roles such as Lady Milford in Intrigue and Love, Adelheid von Walldorf in Götz von Berlichingen and Lady Macbeth. She did not seem born for such roles, but Wilhelm Grothe noted, "It is true that she did not draw such character roles al fresco, but they were all the more perfectly reproduced by her." Apparently, however, the artist, who continued to be in poor health, was sometimes denied recognition: The master had to empty the goblet of wormwood, which the mentally blind handed her, drop by drop to the last drop, Grothe formulated after her death.

On 17 September 1860, Clara Hoppé married the court actor Theodor Liedtcke. Grothe indicated that even after this second marriage, the actress's life was not easy: "To the honour of humanity, let us assume that her opponents did not want to wound her to death", we read in his Erinnerungsblatt an die zu früh gestorbene Künstlerin, and: "[H]ad she not possessed a finely constructed artist's soul, many an insult would have passed imperceptibly for her, which thus became a nail in her early coffin."

Clara Liedtcke tried to recover during the theatre holidays in 1862 in Reichenhall and returned apparently healthy, but soon fell ill again. On 6 September 1862 she appeared on stage for the last time as Queen Elizabeth in Maria Stuart. A few weeks later she died of typhoid fever. Stich died in Berlin at the age of 42 and was buried on 4 October 1862 in the Cemetery II of the Jerusalems- und Neue Kirchengemeinde in front of the Hallesches Tor. The funeral was held by the preacher Adolf Sydow. Her husband was also buried there forty years after her. Neither grave has survived.

Wilhelm Grothe, in his Erinnerungsblatt, compared the actress to a female Correggio of the stage: "There was nothing garish, nothing repulsive, no adverse angles and corners - a holy virginity transfigured even the commonplace, the eternal femininity held even the demonic enclosed."
