= Ludwig Buchhorn =

German painter

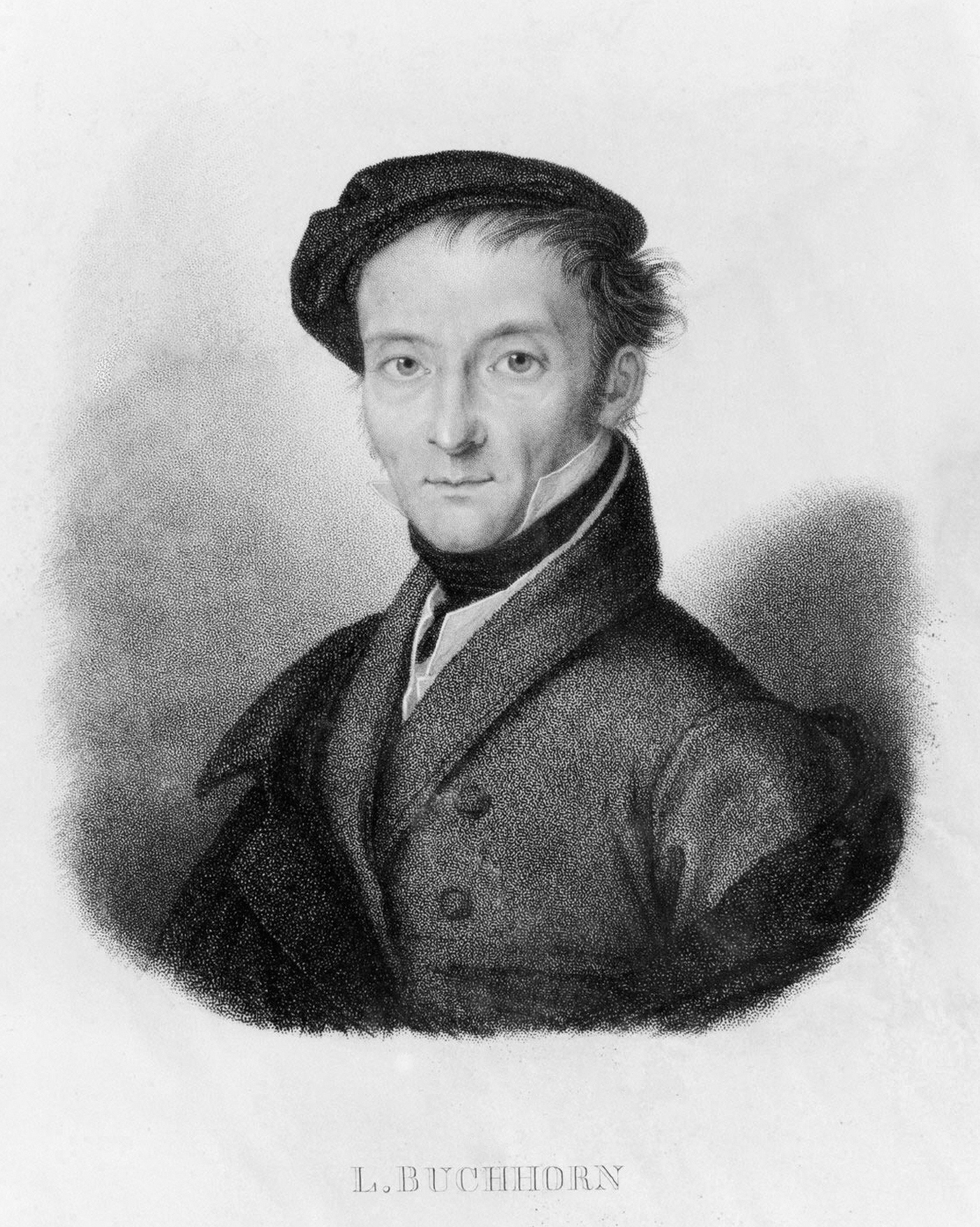
Ludwig Buchhorn (1770–1856) by Auguste Hüssener, Philadelphia Museum of Art

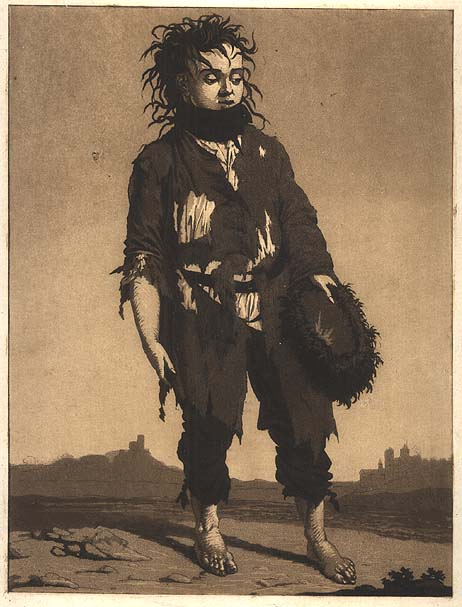
Ludwig Buchhorn: Image from the Die Betteljugend series

Karl Ludwig Bernhard Christian Buchhorn (18 April 1770 – 13 November 1856) was a German painter and engraver.

== Life ==
He was born in Halberstadt. Between 1790 and 1793, he studied at the Prussian Academy of Arts. In addition to aquatint and lithography, Buchhorn adopted from his teachers a Crayon style. He studied at the Berlin Academy of Arts and worked for the Chalcographic Society in Dessau.

In 1797, he got a job as a draftsman and engraver in Dessau, where he worked until 1803. He then worked for a time as a freelance artist.

In 1806, Buchhorn settled in Berlin and worked again with the Academy. He took over as the Kakademie Ordinary Member in 1811, where he served three years later as a lecturer in drawing and engraving. In 1814, Buchhorn co-founded the Berlinische Artists' Association.

After the death of his teacher Daniel Berger, Buchhorn was entrusted in 1824 with the leadership of the Academic engraving school. While teaching, he had many disciples, among them were Friedrich Eduard Eichens, Rudolf Hertzberg, Hermann Kramer Edward Almond, Adolf Schrödter. He was awarded the Red Eagle Order, 4th class, on January 20, 1833. At the age of 86 years, he died on 13 November 1856 in Berlin.

In his early works, the Old Master was a big focus of his work. Influenced by Franz Krüger and Johann Gottfried Schadow, Buchhorn soon found a unique style and worked in his later works increasingly from nature. Portraits of Buchhorn were painted by Johann Carl Kretzschmar and Georg Friedrich Adolph Schöner.

== Selected works ==
- Fürst Leopold von Anhalt-Dessau (Portrait)
- Königin Luise (Portrait)
- Major Friedrich von Schill
- Die Betteljugend
- Im Krieg
- Soldaten an der Spree
- Christ Blessing the Bread
- Love and Psyche

== See also ==
- List of German painters
