= Elise Bethge-Truhn =

German stage actress and playwright

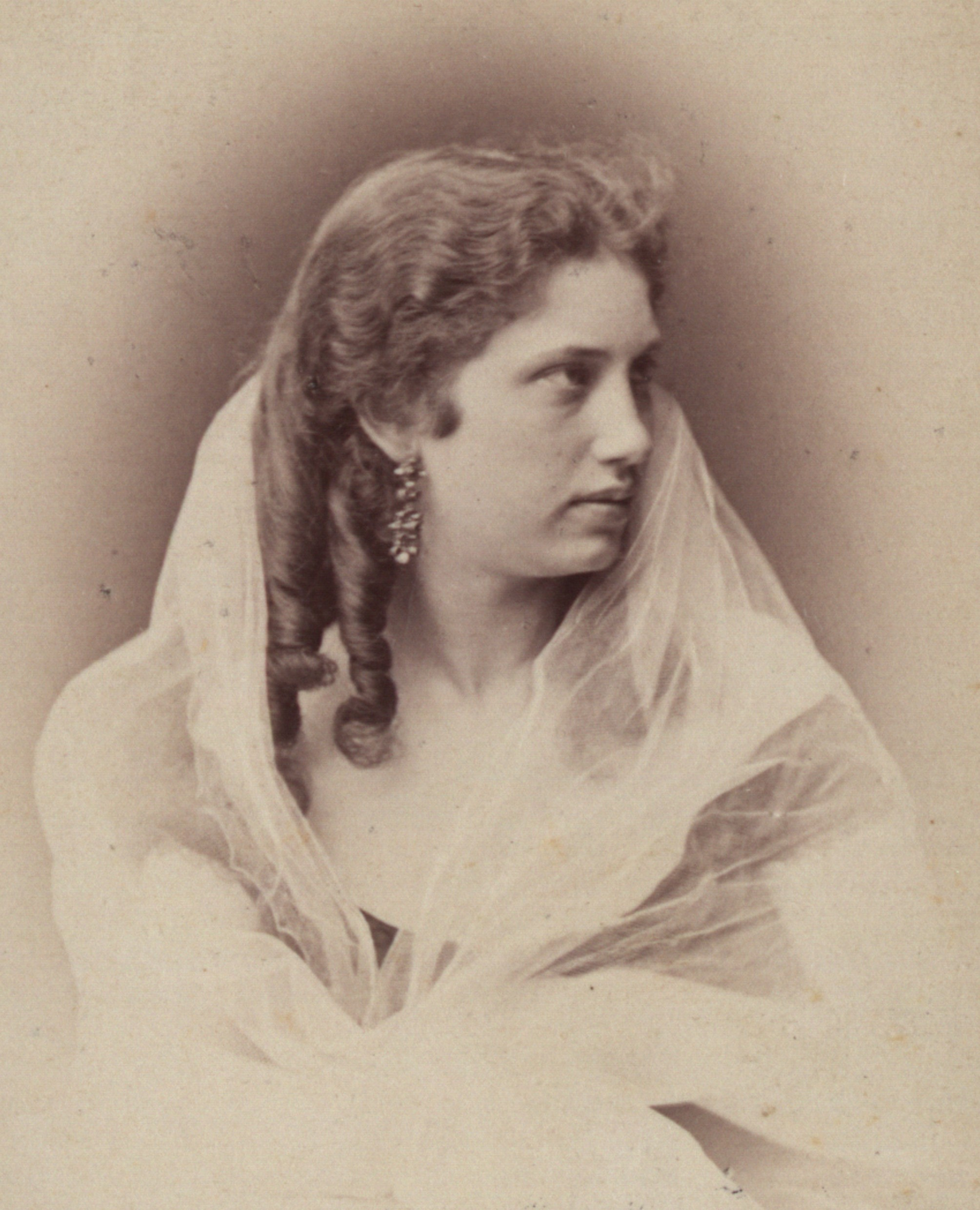
Photograph of Bethge-Truhn by Joseph Albert, c. 1860 – 1870

Elise Bethge-Truhn, born Anna Marie Elisabeth Truhn (4 March 1838 – 12 January 1889) was a German actress and playwright.

== Life ==
Born in Berlin, Bethge-Truhn, the daughter of the royal music director Friedrich Hieronymus Truhn, who had no objection to his daughter turning to the stage, first took acting lessons with Auguste Crelinger, then with Sophie Schröder in Hamburg, and entered the stage for the first time in 1854 in Stettin. In 1855, she worked at the city theatre in Riga, and in 1856 at the court theatre in Schwerin. In Schwerin itself she appeared on 2 December 1875 as Britta in the play Karin von Schweden, which she had written herself.

She gained a good reputation not only as a stage artist but also as a playwright.

Bethge-Truhn died in Lübeck at the age of 50.

== Work ==
- Karin von Schweden, first performance on 2 December 1875 in Schwerin
- Die Reise durchs Märchenland, first performance on 25 December 1882 at Kroll in Berlin
- Die Schutzgeister, first performed in Lübeck on 20 December 1886
- Marlitta, first performed on 11 January 1889 in Schwerin
