= Wilhelm Grothe =

German writer

Wilhelm Grothe (5 October 1830 – 13 February 1892) was a German writer, actor and publishing bookseller. He was a representative of the Renaissancismus.

== Life and career ==
Born in Berlin, Grothe, son of a school headmaster, studied history and philology. He was a partner in Richard Sandrog & Co. from 1860 to 1862, and from 1863 the owner of the Wilh. Grothe company, and from 1867 the owner of Wilh. Grothe's assortment. Among other things, he wrote a Borgia trilogy; about the theatre he wrote several writings in the series Aus dem Reiche der Lampen und der Schminke.

Julia Ilgner proposed the term Renaissance novel to categorise his epic historical poetry. His Cesare Borgia as representative of the Panitalia idea in The Duke of Valentinois was allusive with regard to German conditions in the 1860s.

Grothe was a prolific writer:

In 1861 he published Schwert und Kapuze oder König Wenzeslav und die Seinen, Nordlands-Sagen and Erbachau. Aus dem Leben eines Dichters, and in 1862 the novel Nebel und Sonnenschein was published. The novellas volume Was mein Auge sah und mein Ohr gehört (What my eye saw and my ear heard) dates from 1863. In 1864 the novel Ein Dämon and the saga Schildhorn und Teufelssee appeared, in 1865 Onkel Dickchen came out, in 1866 the comic novel Komödiantenstreiche.

He published Children of the Pope in 1867. The historical novel The Duke of Valentinois dates from the same year, as does Theologian and Comedian. In 1868 came Bühnenlust und Schauspielerleid and Frauenhaß und Frauenliebe, and in 1869 Glanz und Fall.

In 1876, he published Children of Happiness, in 1877 Belladonna, followed in 1878 by The Rebel's Sword or The Rose of Geyersberg or Knightly Pride and Peasant Servitude. In 1880 came Barholomäus Blume. Der Bürgermeister von Marienburg came out, in 1881 Unter dem geflügelten Löwen, in 1882 his historical novel Russische Rebellen was published.

He also published several dramatic works: in 1874 came out Richelieu, in 1875 Zambo and Strafford.

In 1883, Grothe's libretto to the opera Sangeskönig Hiarne und Das Tyrsingschwert was printed in Munich. The music was by Heinrich Marschner. The premiere took place on 13 September 1863 at the Comoedienhaus.

Apparently without a year, but probably around 1862, appeared Clara Liedtke, a souvenir sheet for the actress Clara Stich, who died in 1862.
