= Bertha Stich =

German stage actress

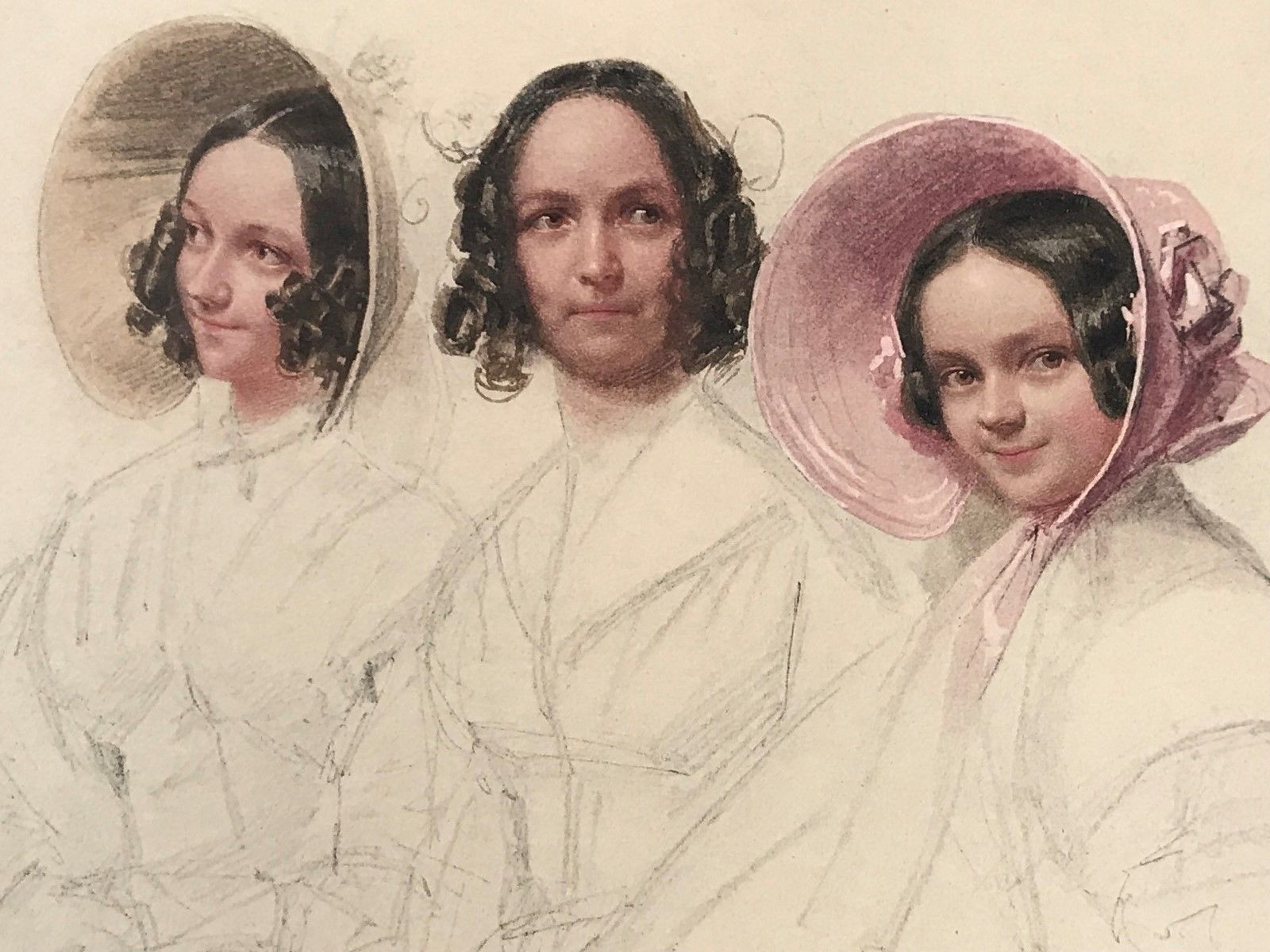
Auguste Crelinger with her daughters (left: Bertha Stich), Lithograph after Franz Krüger

Pauline Sophie Bertha Stich, married name Miehe from 1844 (4 October 1818 – 18 August 1876), was a German stage actress.

== Life ==
Born in Berlin as the daughter of the acting couple Wilhelm Stich and Auguste Stich, née Düring, who was widowed in 1827 and married the banker's son Otto Crelinger, Stich was trained for the stage by her mother. Together with her mother and sister Clara, she entered the stage of the Königstädtisches Theater in Berlin for the first time in 1834 as Eucharis in Sappho. This performance led to an immediate engagement in which she, like her sister, took on the Rollenfach of the teenage lover, and which lasted until 1842. Guest performance tours took mother and daughters to Hamburg and Vienna, among other places.

In the 1940s, Stich moved to the Hamburg Stadttheater as the first lover in mourning, show and comedy. She made her debut there on 9 April 1842 as Julie. In Hamburg, Stich perfected her training at the dramaturgical institute of the writer and theatre practitioner Karl Töpfer. A guest performance tour took her back to Berlin in September 1843, where her roles included Luise Millerin in Schiller's Intrigue and Love celebrated successes.

On 29 June 1844, she married the surgeon and (since 1860) chief staff physician Dr. Adolph Ferdinand Miehe (1813–1876) and retired entirely to private life after marriage. Her last role was Puck in A Midsummer Night's Dream to incidental music by Mendelssohn first on the Hamburg, then on the Berlin stage.

Bertha Miehe died after a short illness on 18 August 1876 in Hamburg; her husband died only eight weeks later on 19 October 1876.
