= Amalie Haehnel =

Austrian operatic mezzo-soprano

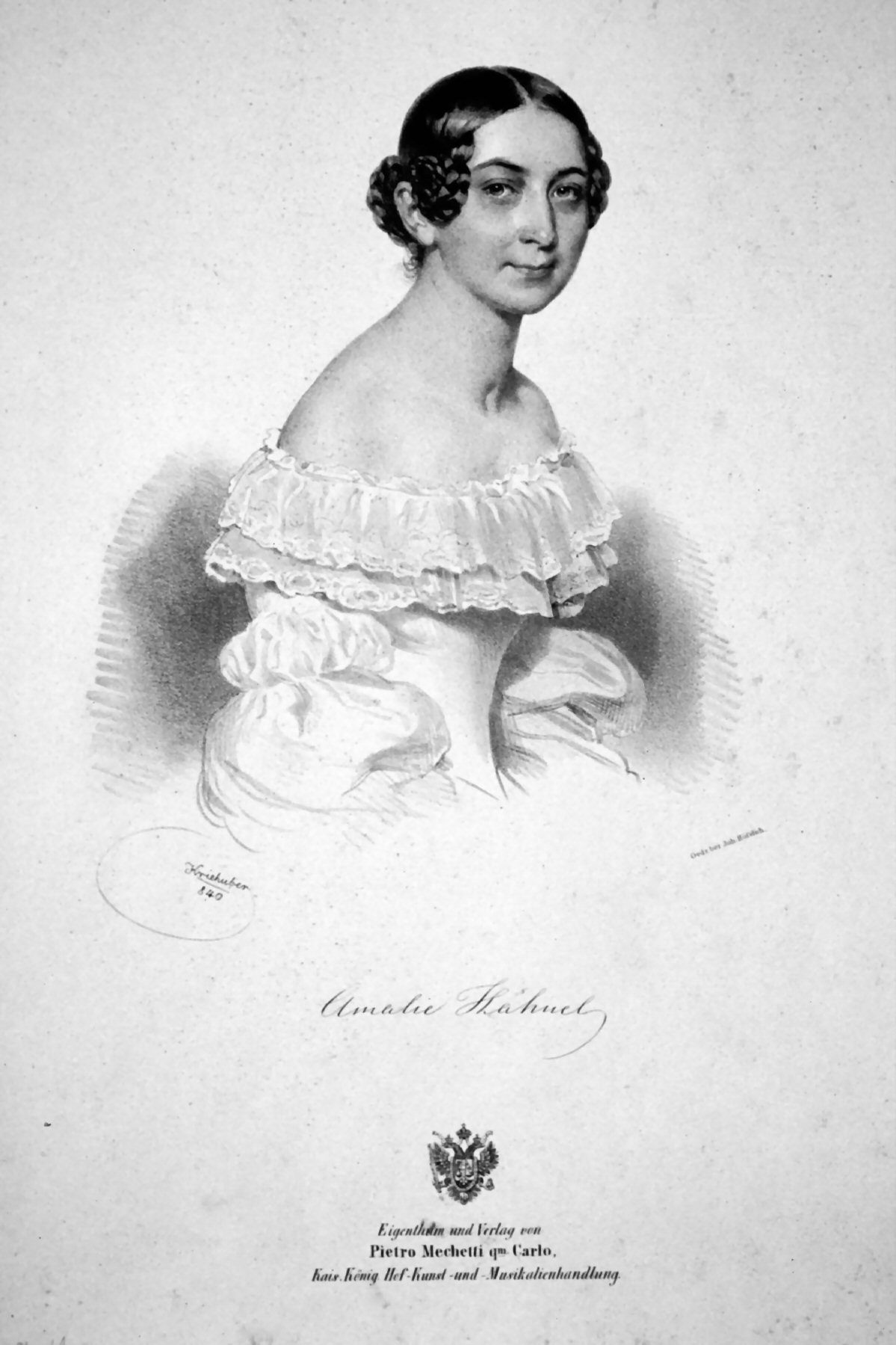
Amalie Haehnel

Amalie Haehnel, also Amalie Hähnel, (1807 in Vienna (Note: According to and BLKÖ, Wienwiki and ÖML, she was born in 1806 in Kyselka near Karlsbad, the ADB writes Großhübel zu Wien) – 2 May 1849 in Berlin) was an Austrian operatic singer (contralto, mezzo-soprano) and vocal teacher.

== Life ==
Haehnel received her musical training from Antonio Salieri and Giuseppe Ciccimarra and first appeared before the public as a concert singer. Even then, her voice had a range of over two octaves, from C-sharp to two-stroked F-sharp, and her debut caused a sensation. Haehnel's theatre career began with her performance of Rosine in The Barber of Seville at the Wiener Hofoper.

She subsequently accepted engagements at several Austrian theatres and finally followed a call to the Königsstädtisches Theater in Berlin in 1832. There she worked with great success and soon became the darling of the audience. In 1841 she was appointed to the Kingliche Bühne and awarded the title of Kammersängerin for her achievements. In 1845 she joined the court theatre and worked as a vocal trainer.

== Student ==
- Clara Stich
