= Alexander Groschke =

German civil servant and parliamentarian

Friedrich Adolf Alexander Groschke (23 March 1821 – 27 January 1871) was a German civil servant and parliamentarian.

== Life ==
Groschke studied law at the Ruprecht-Karls-Universität Heidelberg. In 1842, he became a member of the Corps Saxo-Borussia Heidelberg. After his studies and judicial clerkship, he entered the Prussian civil service. In 1852, as a court assessor, he was appointed Landrat of the district of Frankenstein. In January 1861 he received Karl von Holtei there, who had travelled to give a lecture engagement and wrote of Groschke: "It is impossible to be more obliging and gracious towards a travelling old singer." Groschke held the office until his death in 1871.

In 1851, Groschke married the daughter of the railway and insurance entrepreneur Otto Crelinger and the actress Auguste Stich-Crelinger, Johanne Henriette Emilie Auguste Crelinger (1828–1900). Holtei's memoirs speak of her as a "clever, beautiful, lovable woman" whom the author had already known during his time in Berlin as a child. After Groschke died heavily in debt, his widow had to earn her living in Berlin with an educational boarding school for superior daughters.

Several children were born of this marriage. From the estate of the music educator Clara Groschke, a portrait Auguste Crelinger as Maid of Orleans (1818) by Friedrich Georg Weitsch was consigned to the Märkisches Museum in 1925, as well as a portrait of her great-grandfather Johann Jacob Crelinger, now lost.

Groschke belonged to the Second Chamber of the Landtag of Prussia in the 3rd legislative period from 1852 to 1855 as a deputy for the constituency of Breslau 4. In the 10th and 11th legislative periods he sat from 1867 until his death in 1871 for the constituency Governmental District of Breslau 9 (Frankenstein, Münsterberg) as a member of the parliamentary group of the Conservative Party in the Prussian House of Representatives.
