= Lina Fuhr =

German actress (1828–1906)

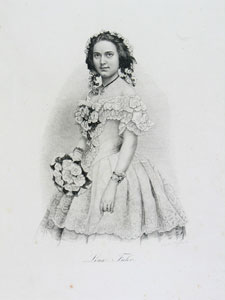
Lina Fuhr by Auguste Hüssener

Lina Fuhr, real name Karoline Fuhrhaus, also Lina Waldau (28 July 1828 – 15 May 1906) was a German stage actress.

== Life ==
Fuhr was born Karoline Fuhrhaus, daughter of an electoral chamber councillor at the Oberfinanzkammer in Kassel. She appeared as a child in the role of Otto in Adolf Müllner's play Die Schuld in Hanover, later appeared on many of Europe's major stages and had her last engagement in Berlin. She made her debut at the Stralsund Theatre in 1845 and then had engagements in Stettin and at the Court Theatre in Stuttgart. Other stops were Dresden, Vienna and, in 1854, London, where she made guest appearances with Emil Devrient and Ludwig Dessoir and was particularly appealing in the role of Ophelia.

From 1849 to 1852, she had an engagement at the Thalia Theater in Hamburg, after which she moved to the Berlin Hofbühne, where she made her debut in the role of Gretchen. She gave her farewell performance on 11 November 1860 as Leonore in The Conspiracy of Fiesco at Genoa.

In 1860, she retired to private life. She married the ophthalmologist and Privy Councillor of Public Health Dr Adolf Ernst Waldau (1822-1895), who had his practice and flat in the Königsmarcksches Palais at Mauerstraße 36. The marriage produced daughters Wilhelma and Lina. On the same floor as the Waldau family lived Gustav zu Putlitz with his family.

In 1904, she published her memoirs under the title Von Sonne und Sorgen. Memories from Art and Life. In it, she also mentions her lively correspondence with Kaiser Wilhelm I, who was the godfather of her eldest child. A portrait of Lina Fuhr is in the National Gallery in Berlin.

Fuhr died in 1906 in Berlin at the age of 77. She was buried in the Alter Zwölf-Apostel-Kirchhof in Schöneberg, where eleven years earlier her husband had already found his final resting place. Both graves are not preserved.
