= Ferdinand Schimon =

German opera tenor and painter (1797–1852)

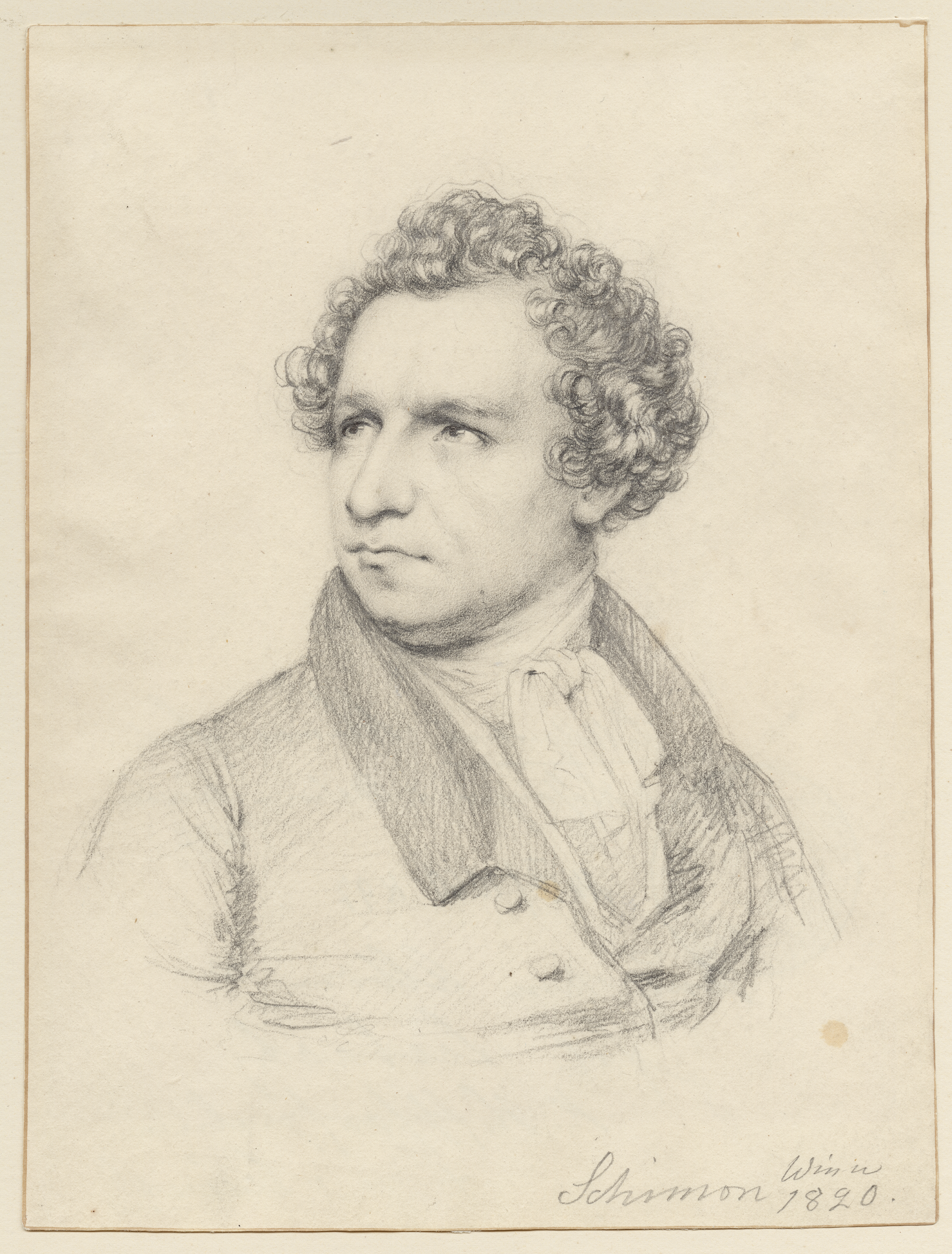
Pencil self-portrait, made in Vienna in 1820 – Munich Stadtmuseum.

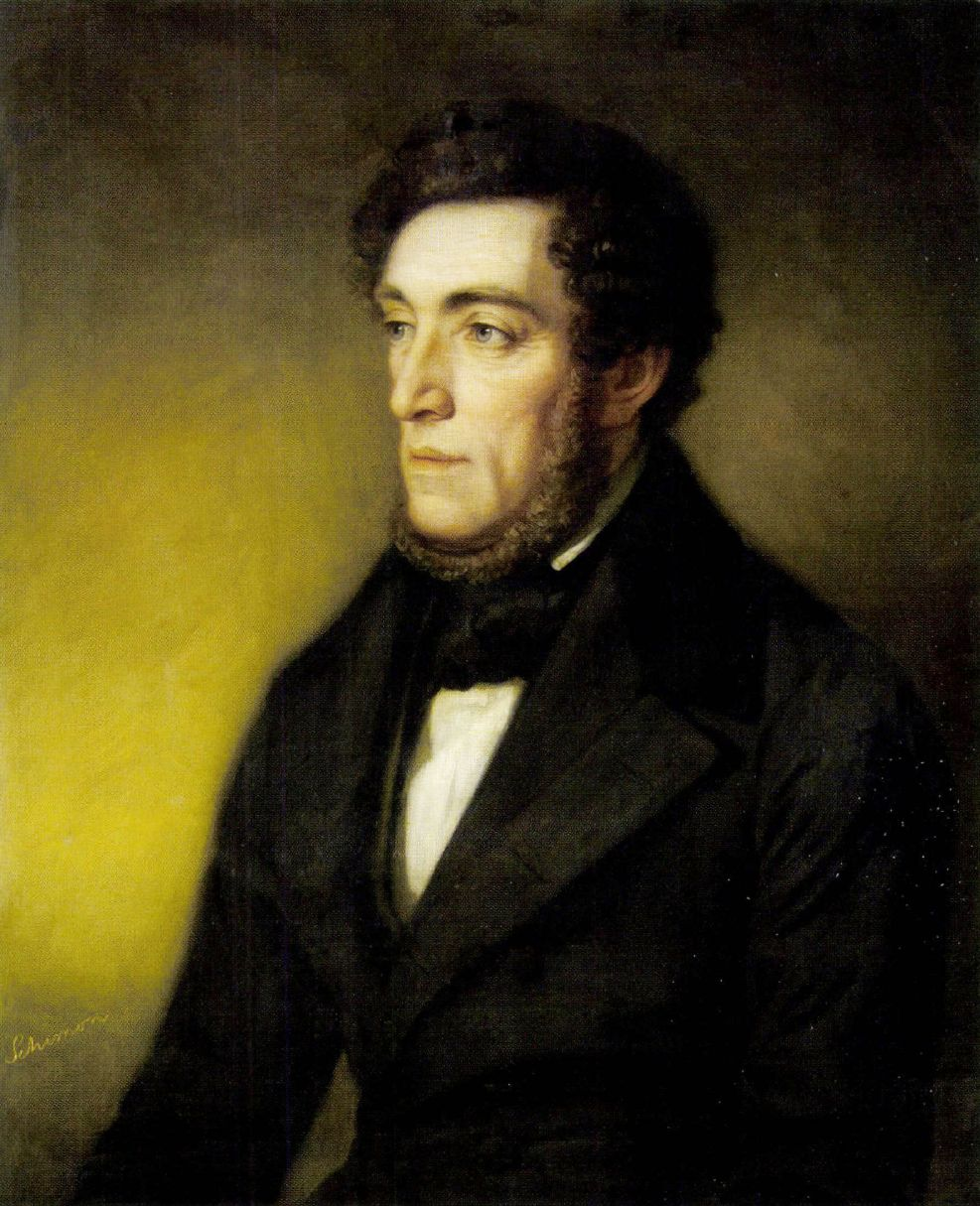
Self-portrait made in Pest in 1843 – Hungarian National Gallery, Budapest.

Ferdinand Schimon (6 April 1797 - 29 August 1852) was a German opera tenor and portrait painter.

His brother Maximilian Schimon (1805–1859) was also a painter, whilst Schimon's own son Adolf became a singing teacher, pianist and composer and Adolf's wife Anna Schimon-Regan was a singer and taught at the Leipzig Conservatoire and the Royal Academy for Music in Munich.

== Life ==
Born in Buda, early in life he moved to Vienna, where he studied as a painter under Johann Baptist von Lampi the Younger. In 1818 he painted portraits of Joseph Koberwein and Maximilian Korn, both actors at the Burgtheater, along with ones of members of the nobility. He became friends with the composer Franz Schubert, who encouraged him to become a singer. While still in Vienna he performed the role of Palmerin in the premiere of Schubert's Die Zauberharfe on 19 August 1820.

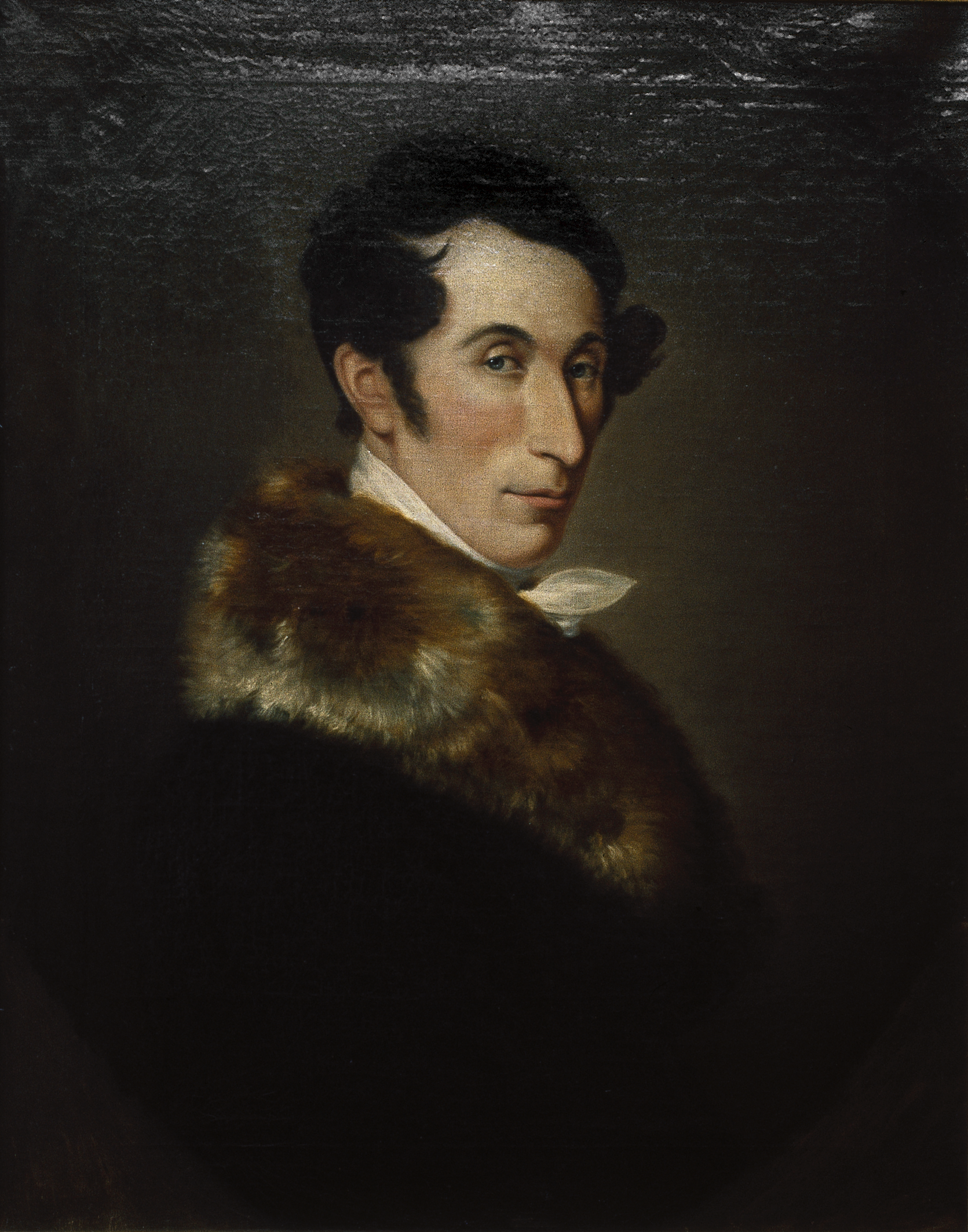
Schimon's portrait of Carl Maria von Weber, 1825 – Dresden City Art Gallery.

In 1821 he moved to Munich and on 1 July performed in Beethoven's Fidelio at the Munich Court Opera. He mostly sang supporting roles for the Court Opera, such as Basilio in The Marriage of Figaro or Lorenzo in La muette de Portici. He retired in 1840 after losing his voice.

He continued painting, including one of the composer, musician and conductor Louis Spohr. He also took part in decorating the loggias of the Neue Pinakothek under Clemens von Zimmermann. One of his best-known works is an 1825 portrait of Carl Maria von Weber and another of Beethoven.

=== Portrait of Beethoven ===
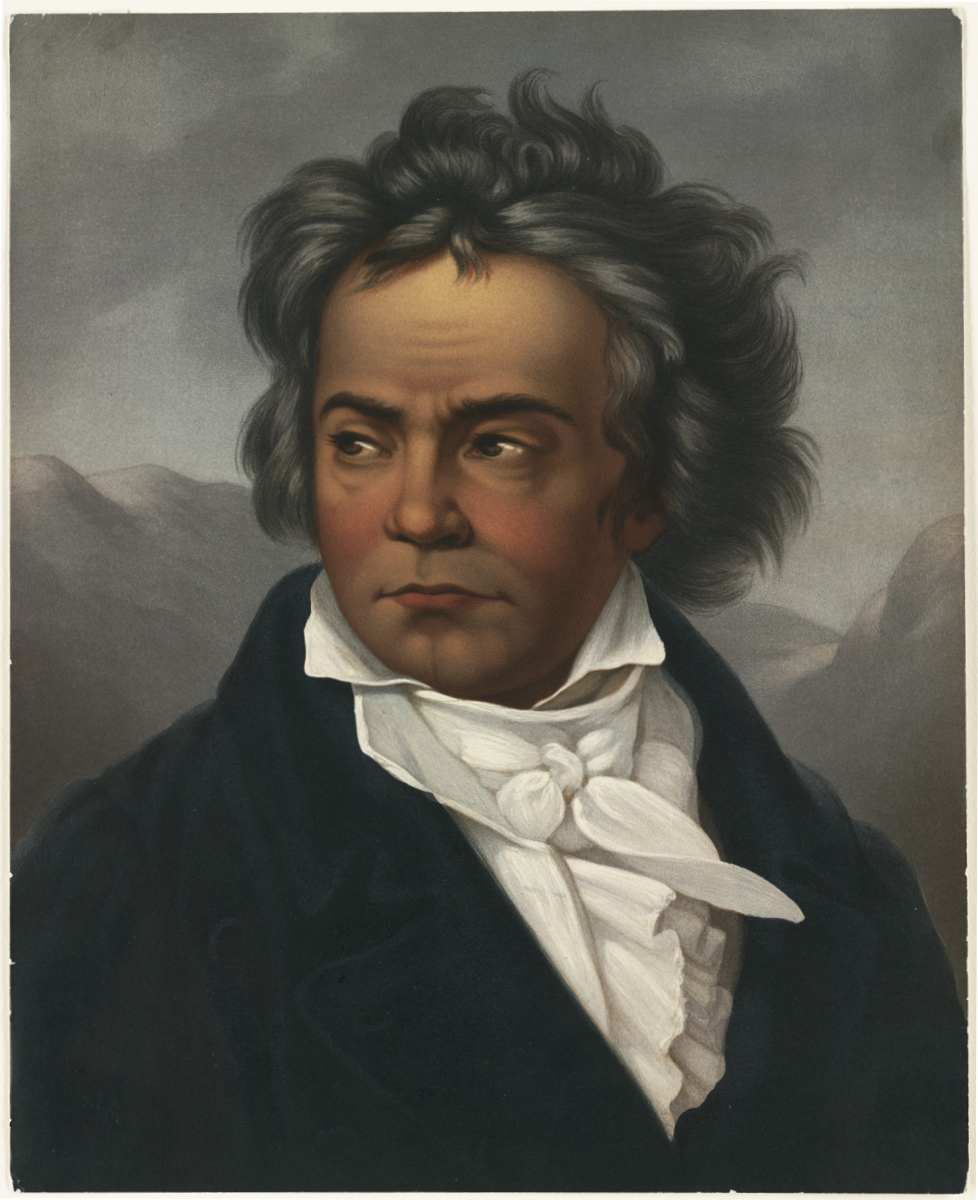
Detail of a copy of Schimon's portrait of Beethoven (1819), Boston Public Library.

Anton Schindler, Beethoven's one-time secretary and later his biographer, claims to have suggested to Schimon that he paint Beethoven's portrait. According to him the painting was created in autumn 1819. However, it is now proven that Schindler only met Schimon years later and so this account is most probably a fabrication.

It may have been created as early as 1815 at the suggestion of Johann Joseph Eichhoff, a childhood friend of the composer from Bonn, who visited the composer in Vienna on 27 March 1815. Upon his return Eichhoff reported to a meeting of the Bonn Reading Society on 6 May 1815 that Beethoven had commissioned a portrait of himself for that Society, which for unknown reasons the Society never received. Considerable evidence suggests that this was Schimon's portrait, especially as the Society asserted its claim to this portrait after Beethoven's death and asked Schindler to donate it to the city of Bonn.

The oval painting on canvas measures 59 by 46 centimetres and shows the composer facing the viewer in a dark blue coat and gazing towards the sky. In the background is a mountain panorama. The painting was acquired by the Berlin City Library and has been on long-term loan to the Beethoven House in Bonn since 1890.

Other artists were inspired by Schimon's portrait, including Carl Mittag in his drawing, Friedrich Eduard Eichens and Robert Reyher in their engravings, Paul Rohrbach in a lithograph, and Fritz Lomens in a pen drawing from 1934.

== Bibliography (in German) ==
- Constantin von Wurzbach: "Schimon, Ferdinand." In: Biographisches Lexikon des Kaiserthums Oesterreich (Biographical Lexicon of the Empire of Austria). Part 29 Kaiserlich-königliche Hof- und Staatsdruckerei, Vienna 1875, p. 342–344 (digitalised).
- Hyacinth Holland (1890). "Schimon, Ferdinand" . Allgemeine Deutsche Biographie (in German). Vol. 31. Leipzig: Duncker & Humblot. pp. 272–273.
- Hubert Reitterer: "Schimon Ferdinand". In: Österreichisches Biographisches Lexikon 1815–1950 (ÖBL). Vol. 10, Austrian Academy of Sciences, Vienna 1994, ISBN 3-7001-2186-5, p. 142.
- Karl-Josef Kutsch, Leo Riemens: Großes Sängerlexikon, Band 4, 4. Auflage. Walter de Gruyter, Berlin 2004, ISBN 978-3-598-44088-5, p. 4204 f.
- Klaus Martin Kopitz: Das Beethoven-Porträt von Ferdinand Schimon. Ein 1815 für die Bonner Lesegesellschaft entstandenes Bildnis? In: Jürgen May (Hrsg.): Beiträge zu Biographie und Schaffensprozess bei Beethoven. Rainer Cadenbach zum Gedenken. Bonn 2011, ISBN 978-3-88188-124-1, p. 73–88 (klaus-martin-kopitz.de PDF).
- Silke Bettermann: Beethoven im Bild. Die Darstellung des Komponisten in der bildenden Kunst vom 18. bis zum 21. Jahrhundert. Bonn 2012.

== External links (in German) ==
- Abbildung von Schimons Beethoven-Porträt mit Kommentar auf der Website des Beethoven-Hauses
- Schimon on the Carl-Maria-von-Weber-Gesamtausgabe
- Schimon on Allmusic
