= Friedrich Eduard Eichens =

German engraver

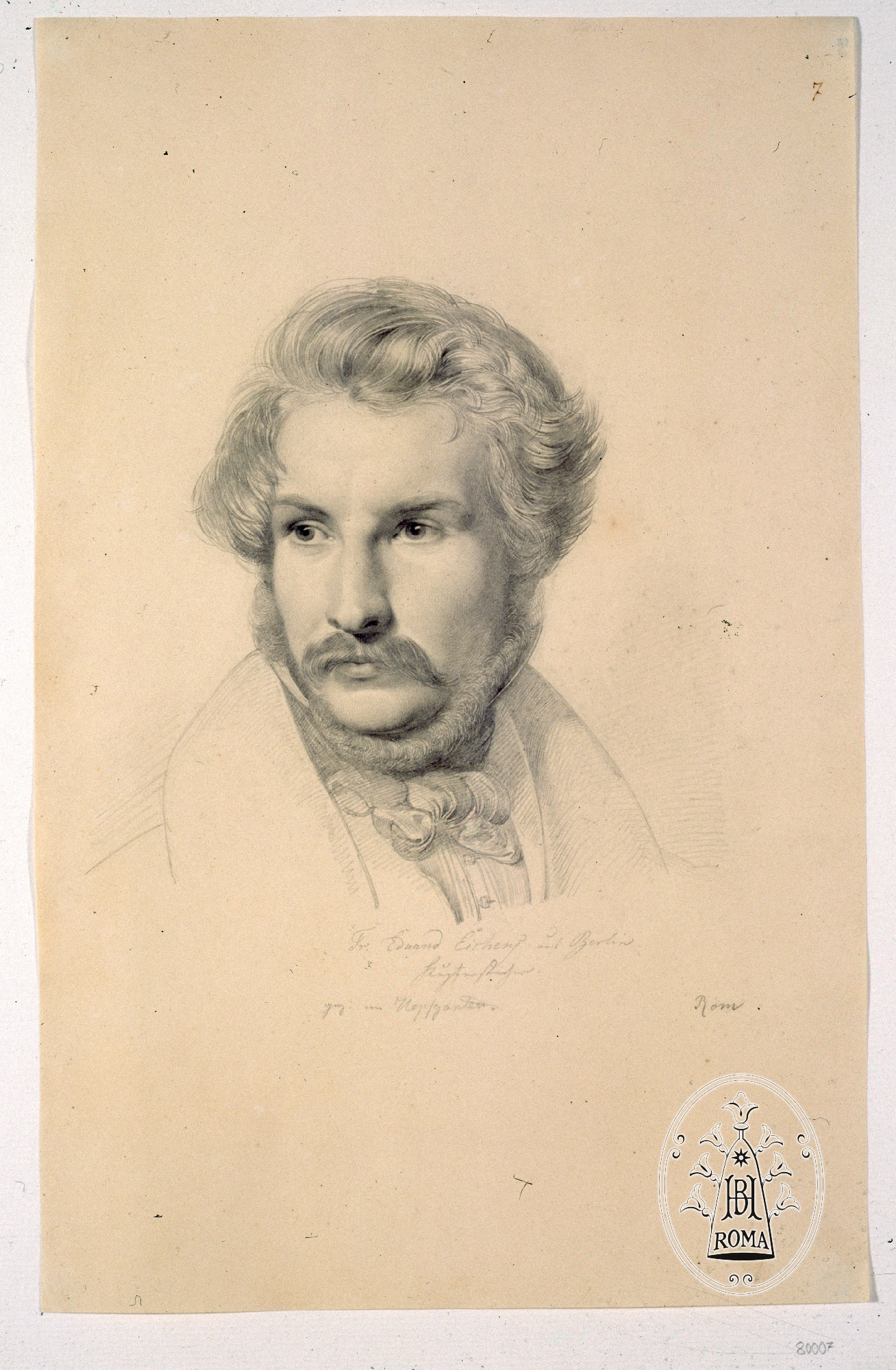
Friedrich Eduard Eichens; by August Ferdinand Hopfgarten

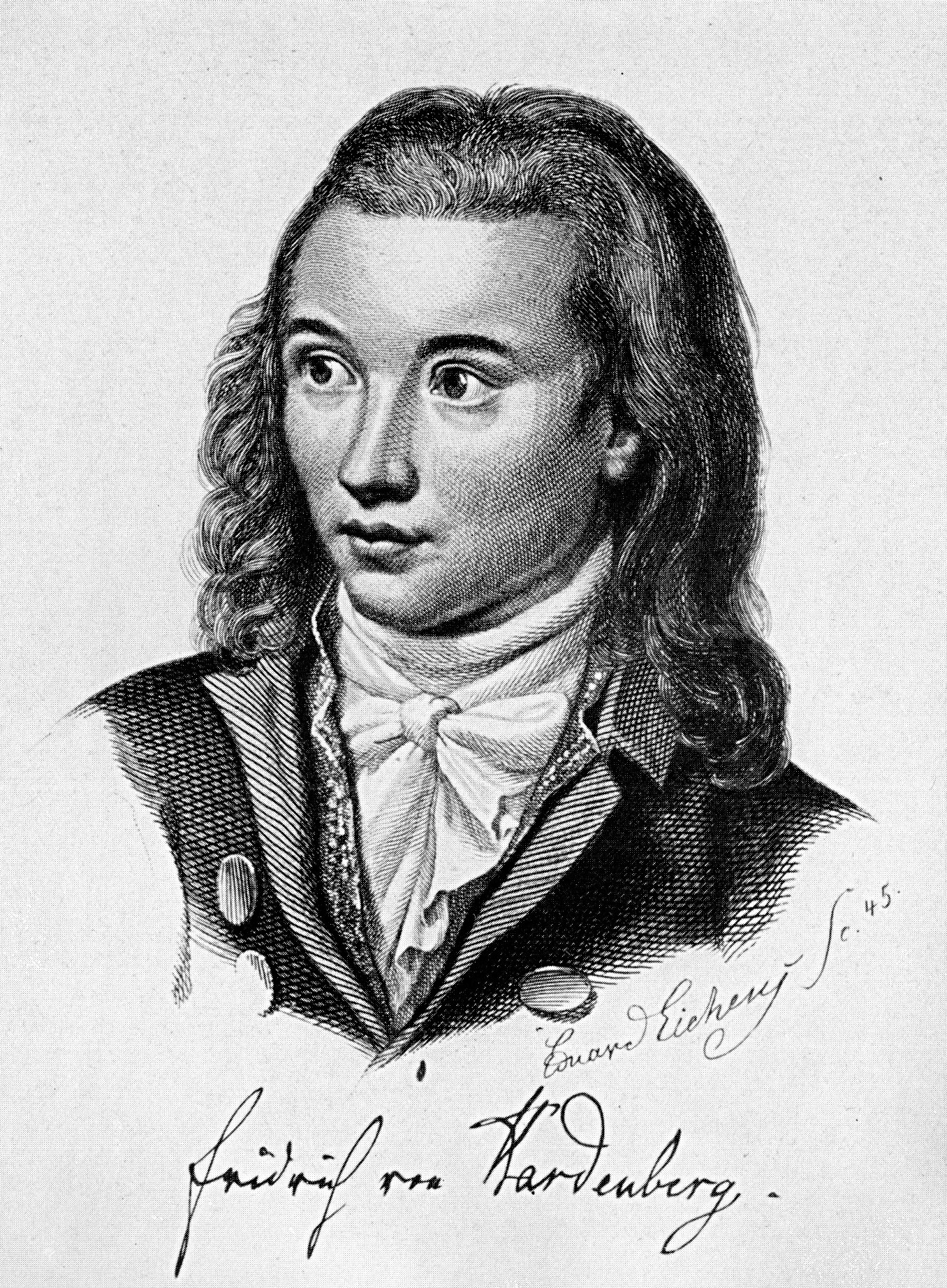
Portrait of the German poet Novalis, 1845

Friedrich Eduard Eichens (27 May 1804, Berlin - 5 May 1877, Berlin) was a German engraver.

== Biography ==
He was born in Berlin. He studied engraving first under Ludwig Buchhorn at the Prussian Academy of Arts in Berlin, and then went to Paris in 1827, with a grant from the government, where he received instruction from François Forster, then to Parma where he studied for three years under Paolo Toschi.

He subsequently visited Florence, Rome, Naples, Venice, and Milan. On his return in 1833 he became a drawing master in the Prussian academy. He died in Berlin in 1877.

== Work ==
Eichens engraved some of Kaulbach's frescoes in the Berlin Museum, and also his Shakespeare Gallery. He also did numerous portraits of contemporary celebrities after photographs. Among his prints are the following:

- Madonna; after Steinbrück. 1833.
- Adoration of the Kings; after Raphael, 1836.
- The Magdalen; after Domenichino. 1837.
- Madonna; after Raffaellino del Garbo. 1839.
- Portrait of Mendelssohn; after Hildebrandt. 1840.
- The Vision of Ezechiel; after Raphael. 1841.
- Frederick the Great as Crown Prince; after Pesne. 1846.
- Come here; after Begas. 1847.
- The Woman taken in adultery; after Pordenone.

== Family ==
His brother Philipp Hermann Eichens was a noted lithographer.
