= Theodor Liedtcke =

German stage actor

Theodor Liedtcke (23 October 1828 – 20 November 1902) was a German stage actor.

== Life ==
Born in Königsberg, Liedtcke was supposed to devote himself to farming but, following his inclination, went to the stage in Königsberg in 1846, then became baritone with a company in Vilnius, then sang bass roles at the Stadttheater zu Stettin and first found a more important engagement as an actor in Altona.

After alternating stays in Stettin, Weimar, Dresden, Legnica, Vienna, he was engaged at the Berlin Court Theatre in 1850. Formerly active mainly in the heroic and amateur genres, he later turned to humour and became one of the happiest representatives of humorous intellectuals and aristocrats of birth in tailcoats. He appeared as a guest in Hamburg, Leipzig and Munich.

Liedtcke died in Berlin in 1902 at the age of 74. He was buried in the Jerusalems- und Neue Kirche Cemetery II in front of the Hallesches Tor, where forty years earlier his wife Clara Liedtcke, who had died at an early age, (1820-1862), had found her final resting place. Neither grave is preserved.
