= Auguste Crelinger =

German stage actress (1795–1865)

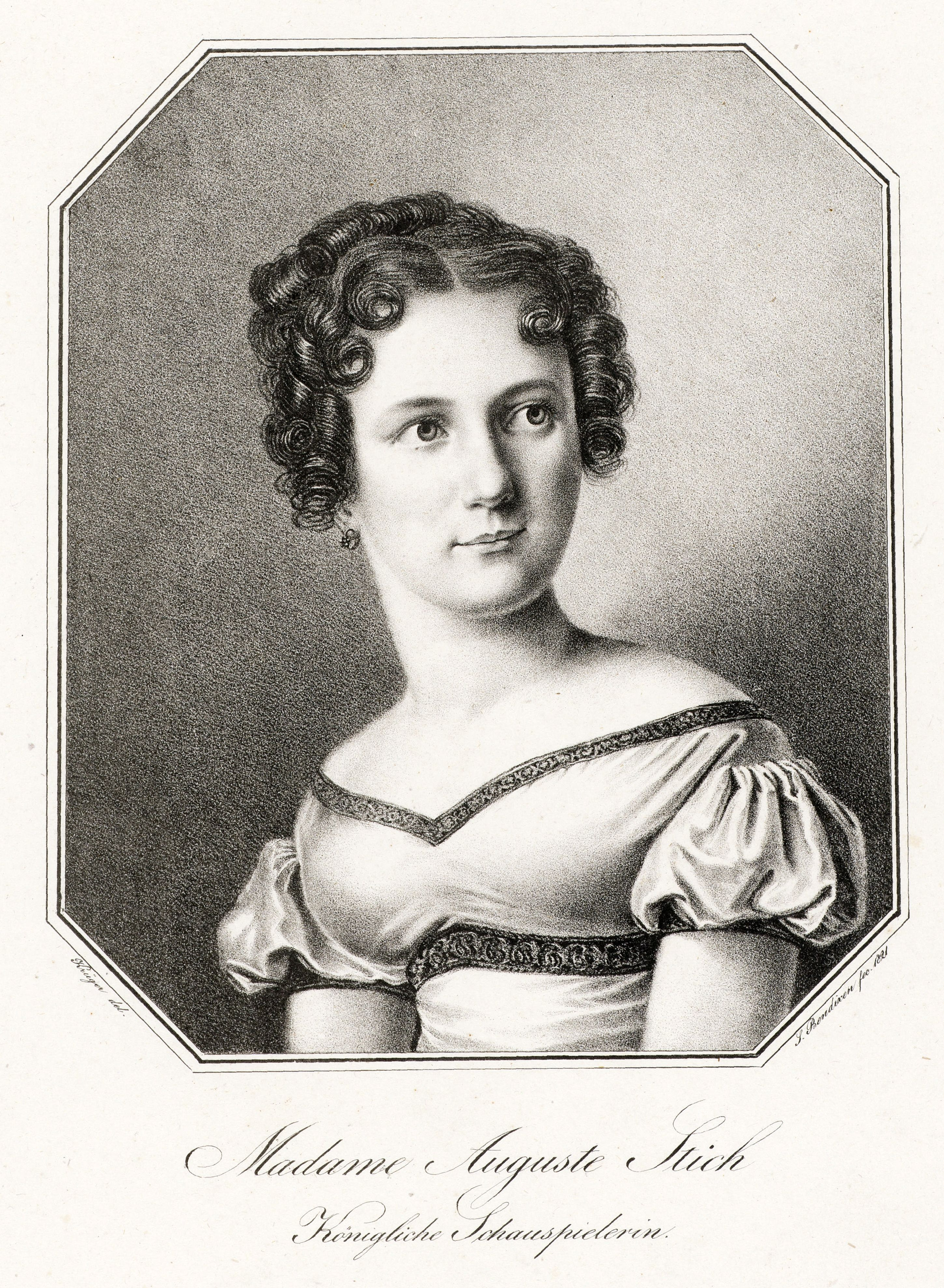
Auguste Stich, Portrait by Siegfried Bendixen

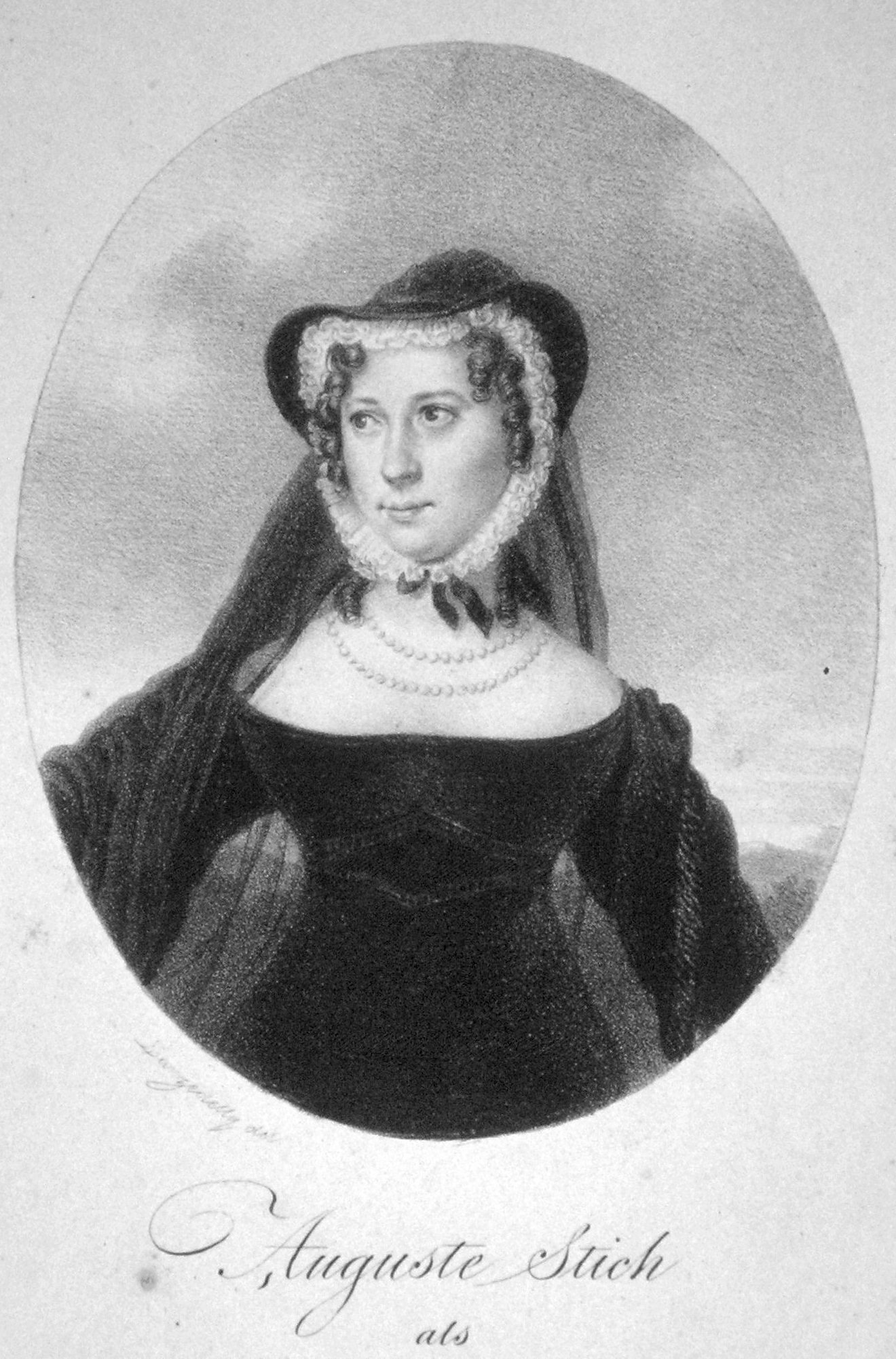
Auguste Crelinger-Stich als Maria Stuart, lithograph by Joseph Lanzedelly the Elder

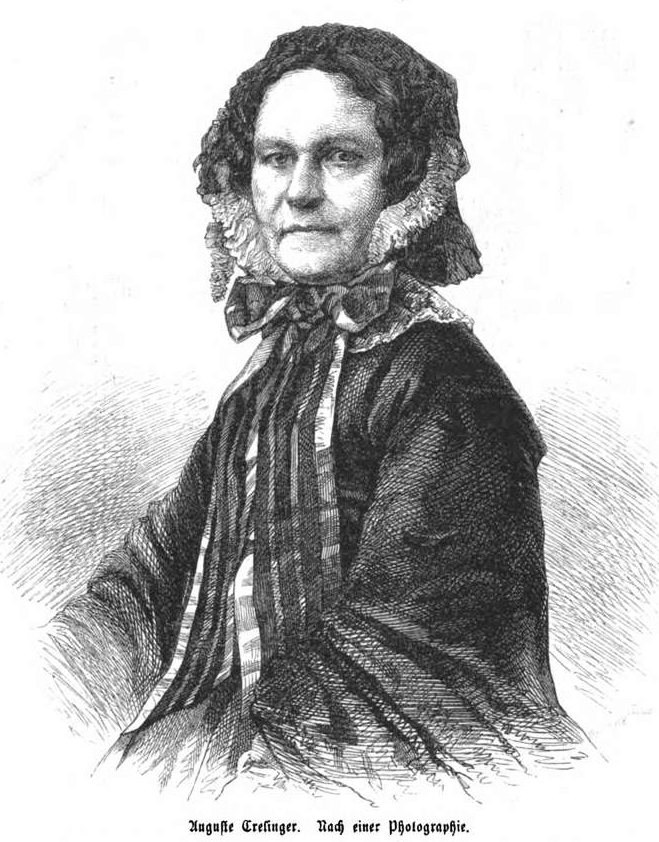
Auguste Crelinger, 1862.

Auguste Sophie Crelinger (widowed Stich, born Düring (7 October 1795 – 11 April 1865) was a German stage actress.

== Life ==
Born in Berlin, Düring gained her first stage experience as a child with the theatre company Urania. On the occasion of one of these performances she also made the acquaintance of Princess Charlotte von Hardenberg (former actress Langenthal). The latter applied to the theatre director August Wilhelm Iffland for Düring and after her successful debut on 4 May 1812 as Margarete (Die Hagestolzen), she was engaged and remained a member of the royal court theatre there until her last performance.

In 1817, Düring married the actor Wilhelm Stich (1794-1824) and had two daughters with him: Bertha (1818-1876) and Clara (1820-1865), both of whom also went to the stage, and two sons, including Gustav (1822-1848), who died of liver disease at the age of 26 in Bombay, East India.

Stich died under tragic circumstances. Gebhard Bernhard Carl Blücher von Wahlstatt (1799-1875), a grandson of the famous Feldherrn, was a second lieutenant in the Guard Hussars and had a rendezvous with Auguste Stich on 6 February 1823, as he wanted to say goodbye to her before a long journey. In the stairwell, he met her husband, whom he injured with his dagger after a brief heated argument. Blücher was sentenced to three years' imprisonment which he served at the Wisłoujście Fortress.

Whether there was actually a sexual relationship between the officer Blücher and Auguste Stich is unclear. When Stich returned to the stage as "Thecla" on 8 May of the same year, she was already pre-judged by the audience and booed as an adulteress. To escape this, she travelled to Paris with her husband in early 1824, where she met, among others François-Joseph Talma. According to statements by Ludwig Rellstab (Nothgedrungene Berichtigung), the actor Wilhelm Heinrich Stich died of an infected spleen.

In her second marriage, the widowed Auguste Stich married the railway and insurance entrepreneur Otto Crelinger in Berlin, whose parents - Johann Jacob Crelinger (1753-1837) and Henriette Wilhelmine Charlotte Catherina Crelinger (1774-1826), née Philippsborn -, had great reservations about this marriage. Only after the death of Crelinger's mother in December 1826 was the couple able to become engaged on 31 January 1827; the marriage took place on 23 April 1827.

The relationship with Crelinger enabled the actress to go on educational trips, including to Paris and Saint Petersburg; their house in Berlin became a centre of socialising.

A daughter they had together from this marriage, Johanne Henriette Emilie Auguste Crelinger (1828-1900), married the lawyer and later district administrator of the district of Frankenstein in Silesia, Alexander Groschke (1821-1871). From the estate of the music teacher Clara Groschke, a now lost portrait Auguste Crelinger as the Maid of Orleans (1818) by Friedrich Georg Weitsch came into the Berlin Märkisches Museum in 1925.

Around 1839/1840, Auguste von Bärndorf was a pupil of Crelinger.

After Crelinger celebrated her 50th anniversary at the Berlin Hofbühne in 1862, she retired to private life. She died in Berlin in 1865 at the age of 69 and was buried in the Cemetery II of the Jerusalems- und Neue Kirche in front of the Hallesches Tor there. The grave is not preserved.

== Quote ==
The play was unselfconscious, unforced, without fear or pretension. Nothing learned, nothing borrowed, everything sweet and easy..

— Prof. Samuel Heinrich Catel, Vossische Zeitung

A beautiful figure, a sonorous organ, expressive facial expressions and genuine artistic study were the most distinguished characteristics of this almost consummate actress.

— Ludwig Rellstab, from a theatre critic about Auguste Crelinger

== Roles ==
- Iphigenie – Iphigenie auf Tauris (Johann Wolfgang von Goethe)
- Antigone – Antigone (Sophocles)
- Prinzessin von Este – Tasso (Johann Wolfgang von Goethe)
- Sappho – Sappho (Franz Grillparzer)
- Phädra – Phèdre (Jean Racine)
- Gräfin Orsina – Emilia Galotti (Gotthold Ephraim Lessing)
- Gräfin Terzky – Wallensteins Tod (Friedrich Schiller)
- Maria Stuart – Maria Stuart (Friedrich Schiller)
- Adelheid – Götz von Berlichingen (Johann Wolfgang von Goethe)
- Lady Macbeth – Macbeth (William Shakespeare)
- Margarete – Die Hagestolzen (August Wilhelm Iffland)
- Jeanne d'Arc – Die Jungfrau von Orléans (Friedrich Schiller)
- Rosette – Schweizermädchen (Gottlob Benedict Bierey)
- Medea – Das goldene Vlies (Franz Grillparzer)

== Students ==
Auguste von Bärndorf, Elise Bethge-Truhn
