= Auguste Hüssener =

German painter

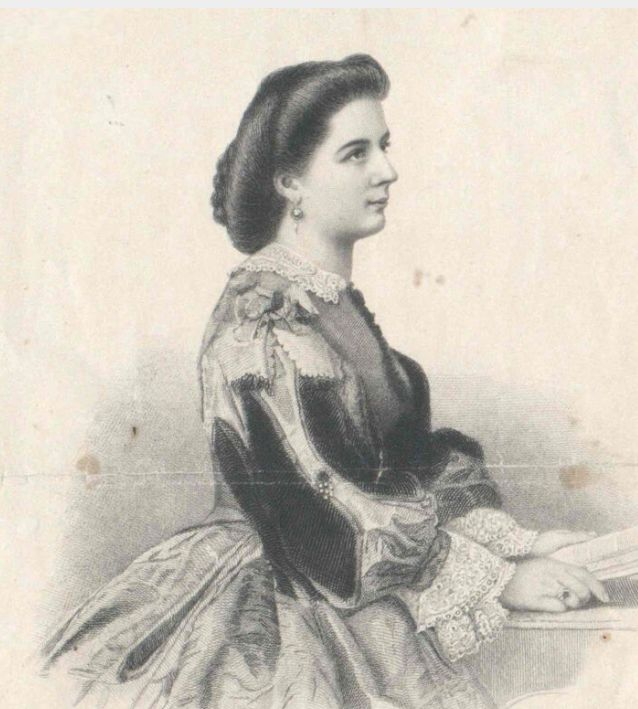
- Steel engraved portrait of Auguste Hüssener, by Marie Kierschner.
- Born: 1789; Szczecin, Poland
- Died: 1877 (aged 87–88); Berlin, Germany
- Known for: Painting, Engraving

Auguste Hüssener (1789 – 13 February 1877) was a German engraver and miniature painter.

Hüssener was born in Szczecin, Poland, and was a pupil of the engraver Ludwig Buchhorn. In 1814 she became a professor at the Prussian Academy of Arts and was entrusted with the leadership of the Academy's School of Engraving from 1824. At the annual exhibitions of the Academy, Hüssener regularly presented works from 1828 to 1860. She became known for her portraits of celebrities from aristocracy, art circles, diplomacy and science. A particular focus was on the portraits of contemporary women, such as the Swedish Nightingale Jenny Lind or Lola Montez. Many of her works were created as templates of other artists.

The sculptor Elise Hüssener and the painter Julie Hüssener were her sisters and also worked in Berlin. Julie Hüssener was married to the painter and Hensel-student Edward Ratti, whose pictures Hüssener often used as a template. Hüssener died on February 13, 1877, in Berlin.
