= Plays with incidental music =

This is an incomplete list of plays for which incidental music has been written.

== A ==
- Abdelazer (Aphra Behn, 1676)

- 1695 music by Henry Purcell

- The Acharnians (Aristophanes, 425 BC)

- 1914 music by Sir Hubert Parry

- Adrienne Lecouvreur (Eugène Scribe and Ernest Legouvé, 1849)

- music by Anatoly Alexandrov (he later arranged an orchestral suite)

- La adultera penitente (Moreto, adapted by Gregorio Martínez Sierra)

- 1917 music by Joaquín Turina

- Advent (August Strindberg)

- music by Heinz Tiessen (died 1971)

- Agamemnon (Aeschylus): Part I of Oresteia (see below)
- L'Aiglon (Edmond Rostand, 1900)

- music by Richard Addinsell

- Aladdin (Adam Oehlenschläger, 1805, music Carl Nielsen, 1919)

- 1918-19 music by Carl Nielsen, FS. 89

- The Alchemist (Ben Jonson, 1610)

- 1710 music by George Frideric Handel

- Alice in Wonderland (adapted for the stage by Eva Le Gallienne from Lewis Carroll's Alice's Adventures in Wonderland; 1933)

- music by Richard Addinsell

- L'Alouette (Jean Anouilh, 1952)

- music by Leonard Bernstein

- Amal, or La Lettre du roi (Rabindranath Tagore, trans. André Gide)

- 1936 music by Darius Milhaud, Op. 156

- Andromaque (Jean Racine, 1667)

- 1903 music by Camille Saint-Saëns

- L’annonce faite à Marie (Paul Claudel, 1910)

- 1932 music by Darius Milhaud, Op. 117 (also 1942)
- 1942 music by Darius Milhaud, Op. 231 (also 1932)

- The Annunciation (La anunciación; Tomás Borrás)

- 1924 music by Joaquín Turina

- Antigone (Sophocles, 442 BC)

- 1841 music by Felix Mendelssohn
- 1893 music by Camille Saint-Saëns
- 1920 music by Willem Pijper (rev. 1922, 1926)
- music by Heinz Tiessen (died 1971)

- Antony and Cleopatra (William Shakespeare, c. 1605)

- 1920 music by Florent Schmitt, Op. 69 (to André Gide's French version Antoine et Cléopâtre)
- 1937 music by Virgil Thomson
- 1944 music by Leevi Madetoja, Op. 80
- music by Quincy Porter (died 1966)

- À quoi rêvent les jeunes filles (Alfred de Musset, 1832)

- 1944 music by Henri Sauguet

- Ariane et Barbe-Bleue (Maurice Maeterlinck, 1899)

- 1920 music by Anatoly Nikolayevich Alexandrov (he later arranged an orchestral suite)

- L'Arlésienne (Alphonse Daudet, 1872)

- music by Georges Bizet. This is best known in the form of two orchestral suites, one compiled by Bizet himself, the other by Ernest Guiraud after Bizet's death.

- The Ascent of F6 (W. H. Auden and Christopher Isherwood, 1936)

- 1937 music by Benjamin Britten

- L'Assassinat du Duc de Guise (a.k.a. La Mort du duc de Guise; Henri Lavedan, 1908)

- music by Camille Saint-Saëns, Op. 128; this was music for a film, not a staged play as such, and is generally considered one of the world's first film scores

- As You Like It (William Shakespeare, c. 1600)

- 1922 music by Roger Quilter
- 1931 music by Ernst Toch
- music by Johan Halvorsen (Livet i skogen, Op. 33; died 1935)
- 1938 music by Ildebrando Pizzetti

- Athalie (Jean Racine, 1691)

- 1785 music by Johann Abraham Peter Schulz
- 1786 music by Georg Joseph "Abbé" Vogler
- music by François Joseph Gossec (died 1829)
- 1845 music by Felix Mendelssohn
- 1946 music by Frank Martin

- Attila (Laurence Binyon)

- 1907 music by Charles Villiers Stanford, Op. 102

== B ==
- The Bacchae (a.k.a. The Bacchantes; Euripides, posth. 405 BC)

- 1924 music by Willem Pijper
- 1926 music by Ernst Toch (R. Viertel's version)
- music by Anatoly Alexandrov

- The Bagpiper of Strakonice (Strakonický dudák; Josef Kajetán Tyl)

- 1926 music by Josef Bohuslav Foerster, Op. 120

- Le Baiser (Théodore de Banville)

- 1888 music by Paul Vidal

- Le Bal des Voleurs (Thieves' Carnival; Jean Anouilh)

- music by Darius Milhaud, Op. 192

- Becket (Alfred, Lord Tennyson)

- 1893 music by Charles Villiers Stanford, Op. 48

- The Bedbug (Vladimir Mayakovsky, 1929)

- 1929 music by Dmitri Shostakovich, Op. 19

- Belshazzar's Feast (Hjalmar Procopé, 1906)

- 1906 music by Jean Sibelius, Op. 51

- Bérénice (Jean Racine, 1670)

- music by Marcel Samuel-Rousseau

- Bertran de Born (Jean Valmy-Baisse, 1936)

- 1936 music by Darius Milhaud, Op. 152a (in 1937 he reworked the music into his Suite provencale. Op. 152b)

- The Betrothal (Maurice Maeterlinck; sequel to The Blue Bird)

- 1921 music by Armstrong Gibbs

- The Birds (Aristophanes, 414 BC)

- 1883 music by Sir Hubert Parry
- 1901 music by John Knowles Paine
- 1947 music by Goffredo Petrassi
- music by Marios Varvoglis (died 1967)

- The Black Masks (Leonid Andreyev, 1908)

- 1923 music by Roger Sessions

- Blaubart (Ludwig Tieck)

- 1835 music by Julius Rietz

- The Blue Bird (L'Oiseau bleu; Maurice Maeterlinck, 1908; for the sequel The Blue Bird and the Betrothal, see The Betrothal above)

- 1909 music by Norman O'Neill, Op. 37
- 1912 music by Engelbert Humperdinck
- music by Leslie Heward (died 1943)

- Boris Godunov (Alexander Pushkin, 1825)

- 1934 music by Yuri Shaporin
- 1936 music by Sergei Prokofiev, Op. 70 bis

- Le Bourgeois gentilhomme (Molière, 1670)

- 1670 ballet music by Jean-Baptiste Lully
- 1912 and 1917 music by Richard Strauss, to Hugo von Hofmannsthal's German versions of the play Der Bürger als Edelmann. The ending of the play was originally replaced by an opera Ariadne auf Naxos. After the failure of this version, Hofmannsthal reinstated the original ending and commissioned extra music from Strauss, including arrangements of Lully. Strauss published a suite containing most of the music from the two versions.
- 1920 music by Karol Szymanowski (Mandragora, ballet-grotesque, Op. 43)
- 1927 music by Erwin Schulhoff (exists as a suite)

- Brand (Henrik Ibsen, 1865)

- 1928 music by Ture Rangström

- The Bride of Lammermoor (Sir Walter Scott, 1819 - see also Ravenswood)

- music by Norman O'Neill

== C ==
- La cena delle beffe (Sem Benelli, 1909)

- 1988 music by Lorenzo Ferrero

- Chitra (Rabindranath Tagore)

- music by Wilhelm Stenhammar (died 1927)

- Christmas Dream (Karácsonyi álom; Géza Gárdonyi)

- 1901 music by Béla Szabados

- Christophe Colomb (Paul Claudel)

- 1952 music by Darius Milhaud, Op. 318

- Cléopâtre (Victorien Sardou, 1890)

- music by Xavier Leroux

- The Clouds (Aristophanes)

- 1905 music by Sir Hubert Parry

- The Comedy of Errors (William Shakespeare, c. 1590)

- 1940 music by Yuri Shaporin

- Conquistador (Archibald MacLeish, poem, 1933)

- 1952 music by Roberto Gerhard

- Consecration of the House (Carl Meisl)

- 1822 music by Ludwig van Beethoven, from The Ruins of Athens

- Coriolanus (William Shakespeare, 1623)

- music by August Söderman (died 1876)
- 1901 music by Sir Alexander Mackenzie, Op. 61

- Le Crocodile (Victorien Sardou)

- 1886 music by Jules Massenet

- Cyclops (Euripides)

- 1925 music by Willem Pijper

- Cymbeline (William Shakespeare, c. 1611)

- music by Robert Johnson, c. 1611
- music by Heinz Tiessen (died 1971)

- Cyrano de Bergerac (Edmond Rostand, 1897)

- 1946 music by Paul Bowles

== D ==
- Danton's Death (Georg Büchner, 1835)

- 1941 music by Henri Sauguet (Le Mort de Danton; play adapted by Michel J. Arnaud)

- Dear Brutus (J. M. Barrie, 1917)

- 1944 music by Francis Poulenc (La Nuit de la Saint-Jean)

- The Death of Tintagiles (La Mort de Tintagiles; Maurice Maeterlinck, 1894)

- 1913 music by Ralph Vaughan Williams

- Déjanire (Louis Gallet)

- 1895 music by Camille Saint-Saëns

- Diarmuid and Grania (George Moore and W. B. Yeats, 1901)

- music by Edward Elgar (published as Grania and Diarmid, Op. 42)

- 1. Introduction and Funeral March
- 2. Song There are seven that pull the thread

- Dom Juan, or The Feast with the Statue (Dom Juan, ou le Festin de pierre; Molière, 1665)

- 1947 music by Henri Sauguet

- Don Carlos (Friedrich Schiller, 1787)

- 1933 music by Anatoly Alexandrov (he later arranged an orchestral suite)
- music by Boris Asafyev

- Don Juan (Aleksey Konstantinovich Tolstoy, 1862)

- 1892 music by Eduard Nápravník
- music by Nikolay Sokolov (died 1922)

- Don Juan und Faust (Christian Dietrich Grabbe, 1829)

- 1925 music by Heinz Tiessen

- A Dream on the Volga (a.k.a. The Voyevoda (A Dream on the Volga) (Aleksandr Ostrovsky, 1865)

- 1886 music by Pyotr Ilyich Tchaikovsky (for the Domovoi scene; a different work than either his opera or symphonic ballad of the same name)

- A Dream Play (Ett drömspel; August Strindberg, 1907)

- 1915 music by Emil von Reznicek
- music by Pancho Vladigerov (an orchestral suite, Op. 13, was published in 1926)
- music by Wilhelm Stenhammar (died 1927)
- 1942 music by Franz Syberg
- music by Kurt Weill (died 1950)

- The Duchess of Malfi (John Webster, 1614)

- 1937 music by Darius Milhaud, Op. 160 (La duchesse d’Amalfi, a French adaptation by Fluchère)
- 1945 music by Benjamin Britten

== E ==
- Egmont (Johann Wolfgang von Goethe, 1788)

- 1810 music by Ludwig van Beethoven, Op. 84

- Egyptian Nights (Alexander Tairov 1934; based on Alexander Pushkin's unfinished short story)

- music by Sergei Prokofiev (no opus number allocated; a suite was later produced, as Op. 61)

- Elektra (Hugo von Hofmannsthal, 1903)

- music by Alexander Tcherepnin (died 1977)

- Die Ermittlung (Peter Weiss, 1965)

- music by Paul Dessau; played at the Deutsche Akademie der Künste, [East] Berlin 1965 performance
- music by Luigi Nono; played at the Freie Volkbühne, [West] Berlin 1965 performance

- Erwin und Elmire (Johann Wolfgang von Goethe, 1773)

- 1916 music by Othmar Schoeck, Op. 25

- L'Esprit triomphant (Romain Rolland)

- music by Alexander Tcherepnin (died 1977)

- Eugene Onegin (Alexander Pushkin, 1825–32)

- 1936 music by Sergei Prokofiev, Op. 71

- The Eumenides: Part III of Oresteia (see below)

== F ==
- Le faiseur (Mercadet ou le faiseur; Honoré de Balzac, 1848)

- 1935 music by Darius Milhaud, Op. 145

- Faust (Johann Wolfgang von Goethe, 1806–1832)

- 1835 music by Julius Rietz
- 1876 music by Eduard Lassen
- 1908 music by Max von Schillings, Op. 24
- 1908 music by Felix Weingartner, Op. 43
- 1928 music by Franz Salmhofer (died 1975)
- 1949 music by Mátyás Seiber

- Faust and the Town (Anatoly Lunacharsky)

- music by Maximilian Steinberg (died 1946)

- The Feast at Solhaug (Henrik Ibsen, 1856)

- 1890 music by Hans Pfitzner

- Fidlovačka aneb Žádný hněv a žádná rvačka (Fidlovačka, or No Anger and No Brawl; Josef Kajetán Tyl, 1834)

- music by František Škroup; it includes the song Kde domov můj? which later became the unofficial national anthem of Czechoslovakia

- Le Fils des étoiles (Joséphin Péladan, 1892)

- music by Erik Satie

- The Flies (Les Mouches; Jean-Paul Sartre, 1943)

- 1947 music by Norman Demuth

- La Foi (Eugène Brieux)

- 1909 music by Camille Saint-Saëns

- La Folle de Chaillot (Jean Giraudoux, 1945)

- music by Henri Sauguet

- The Foresters (Alfred, Lord Tennyson, 1892)

- music by Arthur Sullivan

- The Forrigan Reel (James Bridie)

- music by Cedric Thorpe Davie

- Les Fourberies de Scapin (Molière, 1667)

1949 music by Henri Sauguet

- The Frogs (Aristophanes, 405 BC)

- 1891 music by Sir Hubert Parry

== G ==
- Gala Gay (Bertolt Brecht)

- 1951 music by Alexandre Tansman

- Le Gascon (Théodore Barrière, 1873)

- music by Jacques Offenbach

- Gijsbreght van Aemstel (Joost van den Vondel)

- 1912 music by Alphons Diepenbrock

- The Glass of Water (Le verre d'eau; Eugène Scribe, 1842)

- music by Vissarion Shebalin

- Grettir the Strong (Louis MacNeice)

- music by Mátyás Seiber (died 1960)

- Gurre (Holger Drachmann, 1899)

- music by Johan Halvorsen, Op. 17 (died 1935)

== H ==
- Hail, Spain (Alexander Afinogenov)

- 1936 music by Dmitri Shostakovich, Op. 44

- La Haine (Hatred, Victorien Sardou, 1874)

- music by Jacques Offenbach

- Hamlet (William Shakespeare, c. 1601)

- 1779 music by Georg Joseph "Abbé" Vogler
- 1834 music by Julius Rietz
- 1891 music by Pyotr Ilyich Tchaikovsky, Op. 67a
- 1904 music by Norman O'Neill, Op. 13
- music by Wilhelm Stenhammar (died 1927)
- 1932 music by Dmitri Shostakovich, Op. 32 (also 1954)
- 1934 music by Cemal Reşit Rey
- music by Gabriel Pierné (died 1937)
- 1938 music by Sergei Prokofiev, Op. 77
- 1938 music by Virgil Thomson
- 1954 music by Dmitri Shostakovich (also 1932)
- music by Heinz Tiessen, Op. 30 (died 1971)

- Hannele (Gerhart Hauptmann, 1893)

- music by Alexander Tcherepnin (died 1977)

- Hassan (James Elroy Flecker, 1922)

- 1920 music by Frederick Delius; first performed 1923

- Hécube (Richaud, after Euripides' Hecuba, 424 BC)

- 1937 music by Darius Milhaud, Op. 177

- Die Heilige aus U.S.A. (Stefan Zweig)

- 1932 music by Ernst Toch

- Hélène (Paul Delair)

- music by André Messager, 1891

- Hélène de Sparte (Emile Verhaeren)

- music by Josef Bohuslav Foerster, Op. 116

- Henry VIII (William Shakespeare, c. 1603)

- 1877 music by Arthur Sullivan
- 1949 music by Cedric Thorpe Davie

- Die Hermannsschlacht (Heinrich von Kleist, 1809)

- music by Heinrich Marschner

- Hippolytus (Euripides)

- 1950 music by Norman Demuth

- L'histoire de Tobie et Sarah (Paul Claudel)

- 1968 music by Darius Milhaud, Op. 426

- The House of Aspen (Sir Walter Scott)

- 1829 music by John Thomson

- The House of Bernarda Alba (Federico García Lorca, 1936)

- 1947 music by Darius Milhaud, Op. 280 (La maison de Bernarda Alba)

- The Human Comedy (La Comédie humaine; Honoré de Balzac)

- 1934 music by Dmitri Shostakovich, Op. 37

- Die Hussiten vor Naumburg (August von Kotzebue)

- 1802 music by Georg Joseph "Abbé" Vogler
- 1803 music by Antonio Salieri

== I ==
- The Indian Queen (Sir Robert Howard and John Dryden, 1664)

- 1664 music by John Banister the elder
- 1695 music by Henry Purcell, to an expanded version of the play

- The Inventor and the Comedians (Mark Daniel, 1938–39)

- 1938 music by Dmitry Kabalevsky (arranged 1940 into a concert suite, The Comedians)

- Intermezzo (Jean Giraudoux)

- 1933 music by Francis Poulenc

- The Italian Straw Hat (Le chapeau de paille d'Italie; Eugène Marin Labiche and Marc Michel, 1851)

- 1920 music by Yuri Shaporin
- 1926 music by Randall Thompson (The Straw Hat; written for piano)

== J ==
- Les Jacobites (François Coppée, 1885)

- music by Charles-Marie Widor

- Jacobowsky and the Colonel (Franz Werfel)

- 1944 music by Paul Bowles

- Jedermann (Hugo von Hofmannsthal, 1912; adapted from the 15th-century English morality play Everyman)

- 1916 music by Jean Sibelius, Op. 83

- Jérusalem à Carpentras (Lunel)

- 1966 music by Darius Milhaud, Op. 419

- Le jeu de Robin et Marion (after Adam de la Halle)

- 1948 music by Darius Milhaud, Op. 288

- Johnson over Jordan (J. B. Priestley)

- 1939 music by Benjamin Britten
- 1947 music by Peter Tranchell

- Judith (Jean Giraudoux, 1931)

- 1961 music by Darius Milhaud, Op. 392

- Julius Caesar (William Shakespeare, 1599)

- 1936 music by Darius Milhaud, Op. 158

== K ==
- Kätchen von Heilbronn (Heinrich von Kleist, 1808)

- 1905 music by Hans Pfitzner

- The King (Bjørnstjerne Bjørnson)

- music by Johan Halvorsen, Op. 19 (died 1935)

- King Arthur (J. Comyns Carr, 1895)

- music by Arthur Sullivan

- King Christian II (Adolf Paul, 1898)

- 1898 music by Jean Sibelius, Op. 27

- King Lear (William Shakespeare, c. 1605)

- music by Heinrich Schulz-Beuthen (died 1915; he later used this material in his Symphony No. 6 with men's chorus)
- 1920 music by Yuri Shaporin
- 1936 music by Cemal Reşit Rey
- 1940 music by Dmitri Shostakovich, Op. 58a
- 1958 music by Aram Khachaturian
- music by Franz Salmhofer (died 1975)

- King Stephen (August von Kotzebue)

- 1811 music by Ludwig van Beethoven, Op. 117

- King Svätopluk (Ivan Stodola, 1931)

- 1936 music by Eugen Suchoň

- Kirschblütenfest (Klabund)

- 1930 music by Ernst Toch

- A Klingon Christmas Carol (Christopher Kidder-Mostrom, Sasha Walloch, 2007)

- 2010 music by Mike Hallenbeck; 2011-2013 music by Jon Silpayamanant

- Königskinder (The King's Children; Ernst Rosmer (Elsa Bernstein-Porges), 1895)

- 1897 music by Engelbert Humperdinck (he wrote an opera on the same subject in 1910)

- Kronbruden (The Crown Bride; August Strindberg, 1900)

- 1913 music by August Enna

- Kuolema (Death; Arvid Järnefelt, 1903, revised 1911)

- 1903 music by Jean Sibelius

- the music was revised in 1904, 1906 and 1911, and the original six numbers as presented in 1903 no longer exist
- Valse triste (originally Op. 44; since 1973 it has been numbered Op. 44, No. 1), one of Sibelius's most famous pieces, came from the 1904 revision
- Canzonetta, Op. 62a, was performed for the first time in 1911, but it had been written in 1906, in a different version, as Rondino der Liebenden, adapted from the original music
- Valse romantique, Op. 62b, was specially composed for the 1911 version of the play
- the remaining extant piece, Scene with Cranes, was a combining and revision of two numbers from the original score; it was written and performed in 1906, but it did not form part of the 1911 incidental music, and was published posthumously only in 1973, as Op. 44, No. 2.

== L ==
- The Language of Birds (Adolf Paul, 1911)

- music by Jean Sibelius

- Léocadia (Time Remembered, Jean Anouilh, 1940)

- music by Francis Poulenc

- Leonce and Lena (Georg Büchner, 1836)

- 1931 music by Franz Syberg (Leonce og Lena)
- 1941 music by Henri Sauguet (Léonce et Léna; play adapted by Michel J. Arnaud)
- music by Mátyás Seiber (died 1960)

- The Libation Bearers: Part II of Oresteia (see below)
- Life is a Dream (La vida es sueño; Pedro Calderón de la Barca)

- 1930 music by Leevi Madetoja, Op. 75

- The Little Minister (J. M. Barrie, 1897)

- music by Sir Alexander Mackenzie, Op. 57

- The Lizard (Ödlan; Mikael Lybeck 1864-1925)

- 1909 music by Jean Sibelius, Op. 8

- Lodolezzi sjunger (Bo Bergman)

- music by Wilhelm Stenhammar (died 1927)

- Love's Labour's Lost (William Shakespeare)

- music by Gerald Finzi, Op. 28

- Lucifer (Joost van den Vondel. 1654)

- 1940 music bt Sándor Veress

- Lucky Peter's Travels (a.k.a. The Journey of Fortunate Peter; August Strindberg)

- 1910 music by Josef Bohuslav Foerster, Op. 116a

- Lysistrata (Aristophanes, 411 BC)

- 1908 music by Engelbert Humperdinck

== M ==
- Macbeth (William Shakespeare, c. 1605)

- 1825 music by Louis Spohr, Op. 75
- 1834 music by Julius Rietz
- 1888 music by Arthur Sullivan
- 1920 music by Johan Halvorsen
- 1933 music by Aram Khachaturian (also 1955)
- 1936 music by Cemal Reşit Rey
- 1936 music by Virgil Thomson (for the Orson Welles production)
- 1937 music by Darius Milhaud, Op. 175
- 1942 music by William Walton
- music by Boris Asafyev (died 1949)
- 1949 music by Norman Demuth
- 1949 music by Peter Tranchell
- 1955 music by Aram Khachaturian (also 1933)

- Madame Bovary (Gustave Flaubert, 1856; novel)

- music by Dmitri Kabalevsky

- The Maid of Orleans (Die Jungfrau von Orleans; Friedrich Schiller, 1801)

- music by August Söderman

- The Maid of Pskov (Lev Mei)

- 1877 music by Nikolai Rimsky-Korsakov, rev. 1882 (a different work than his opera on the same subject)

- Le Malade imaginaire (Molière, 1673)

- music by Ludomir Różycki

- Manfred (Lord Byron, c. 1817)

- 1849 music by Robert Schumann, Op. 115 (produced 1852)
- 1898 music by Sir Alexander Mackenzie, Op. 58 (not produced)

- Margot (Édouard Bourdet)

- 1935 music by Georges Auric and Francis Poulenc

- Les Mariés de la Tour Eiffel (The Wedding on the Eiffel Tower; Jean Cocteau)

- 1921 music by Georges Auric, Arthur Honegger, Darius Milhaud, Francis Poulenc, and Germaine Tailleferre, orchestrated by Marius Constant

- Mariotta (Carl Borgaard, based on a comedy by Eugène Scribe)

- 1850 music by Niels Gade

- Marmion (Robert Buchanan, based on Sir Walter Scott's poem Marmion, 1808)

- 1891 music by Sir Alexander Mackenzie, Op. 43

- The Marriage of Figaro (Pierre Beaumarchais, 1778)

- 1935 music by Yuri Shaporin

- Mary Stuart (Friedrich Schiller, 1800)

- music by Vissarion Shebalin

- Masquerade (Mikhail Lermontov, 1835)

- music by Vissarion Shebalin
- 1941 music by Aram Khachaturian

- Masse Mensch (Ernst Toller, 1921)

- music by Heinz Tiessen (died 1971)

- Le massere (Carlo Goldoni, 1755)

- 1993 music by Lorenzo Ferrero

- Master Olof (August Strindberg, 1872)

- music by Tor Aulin (died 1914)

- The Mayor of Zalamea (El Alcalde de Zalamea; Pedro Calderón de la Barca)

- 1836 music by Julius Rietz

- Measure for Measure (William Shakespeare, c. 1604)

- music by Dmitri Kabalevsky

- Medea (Euripides, 431 BC)

- 1843 music by Wilhelm Taubert
- 1938 music by Sándor Veress
- 1942 music by Marios Varvoglis

- Le Médecin volant (Vildrae, after Molière, 1645)

- 1937 music by Darius Milhaud, Op. 165

- Médée (Jean Anouilh, 1946)

- 1948 music by Norman Demuth

- The Merchant (Mercator; Plautus)

- 1950 music by İlhan Usmanbaş (for 2 flutes)

- The Merchant of Venice (William Shakespeare. c. 1597)

- 1871 music by Arthur Sullivan
- 1905 music by Engelbert Humperdinck
- 1917 music by Henri Rabaud
- music by Johan Halvorsen (died 1935)
- music by Boris Asafyev (died 1949)
- 1950 music by Peter Tranchell
- music by Ludomir Różycki (died 1953)

- Merlin (Karl Leberecht Immermann, 1831)

- music by Heinz Tiessen (died 1971)

- The Merry Wives of Windsor (William Shakespeare, c. 1600)

- 1874 music by Arthur Sullivan
- music by Franz Salmhofer (died 1975)

- Michael Strogoff (Jules Verne and Adolphe D'Ennery; an adaptation of Verne's 1876 novel)

- 1880 music by Jules Massenet

- A Midsummer Night's Dream (William Shakespeare, c. 1595)

- music by Felix Mendelssohn (overture 1826; remaining music 1843, including the Wedding March)
- music by Erik Satie (1915, 5 numbers entitled Grimaces, unproduced)
- music by Carl Orff (1917-39; revised 1962)

- The Mighty Magician (El Mágico prodigioso; Pedro Calderón de la Barca)

- music by Josef Rheinberger

- The Miserly Knight (Alexander Pushkin, 1830)

- music by Vissarion Shebalin

- The Misanthrope (Molière, 1666)

- 1950 music by Norman Demuth

- Mother Courage and Her Children (Bertolt Brecht, 1939)

- 1959 music by Darius Milhaud, Op. 379 (Mother Courage)

- Mozart and Salieri (Alexander Pushkin, 1830)

- music by Vissarion Shebalin

- Much Ado About Nothing (William Shakespeare, c. 1598)

- 1915 music by Johan Halvorsen

== N ==
- La nave (Gabriele d'Annunzio)

- 1905 music by Ildebrando Pizzetti

- Navidad (Gregorio Martínez Sierra)

- 1916 music by Joaquín Turina

- Nie-Boska komedia (Zygmunt Krasiński)

- music by Ludomir Różycki

- The Noble's Nest (Liza; Ivan Turgenev, 1859 novel)

- 1940 music by Yuri Shaporin

- No More Peace (Nie wieder Friede; Ernst Toller, 1934)

- music by Herbert Murrill

- Notre-Dame de Paris (Victor Hugo, adapted from his 1831 novel)

- 1879 music by Jules Massenet
- music by Anatoly Nikolayevich Alexandrov (died 1982)

== O ==
- The Oath of the Dead (Zacharias Papantoniou)

- 1938 music by Marios Varvoglis

- Oedipus at Colonus (Sophocles, c. 406 BC)

- 1845 music by Felix Mendelssohn
- 1936 music by Ildebrando Pizzetti

- Oedipus, a Tragedy (John Dryden and Nathaniel Lee, 1679; based on Sophocles)

- 1692 music by Henry Purcell, Z. 583, including Music for a while

- Oedipus Rex (Oedipus Tyrannus or Oedipus the King; Sophocles, 429 BC)

- 1852 music by Franz Lachner
- 1881 music by John Knowles Paine
- 1887 music by Charles Villiers Stanford, Op. 29
- music by Alexander Ilyinsky (died 1920)
- 1936 music by Leevi Madetoja
- 1941 music by Virgil Thomson

- Old Spain (Montagu Slater)

- 1938 music by Benjamin Britten

- Ondine (Jean Giraudoux, 1939)

- music by Henri Sauguet

- On ne badine pas avec l'amour (Alfred de Musset, 1834)

- 1917 music by Camille Saint-Saëns

- On the Frontier (W. H. Auden and Christopher Isherwood, 1938)

- music by Benjamin Britten

- Oresteia (Aeschylus, trilogy, 458 BC)

- 1900 music by Max von Schillings, Op. 12

- Part I - Agamemnon

- 1900 music by Sir Hubert Parry
- 1914 music by Darius Milhaud, Op. 14
- 1930 music by Ildebrando Pizzetti
- 1932 music by Marios Varvoglis

- Part II - The Libation Bearers

- 1915 music by Darius Milhaud (Les choëphores, Op. 24)

- Part III - The Eumenides

- 1885 music by Charles Villiers Stanford, Op. 23
- 1923 music by Darius Milhaud, Op. 41

- Othello (William Shakespeare, c. 1603)

- music by Franz Salmhofer (died 1975)
- music by Clifton Parker (died 1989)

- L'Ours et la Lune (The Bear and the Moon; Paul Claudel)

- 1918 music by Darius Milhaud

== P ==
- Peer Gynt (Henrik Ibsen, 1876)

- 1876 music by Edvard Grieg, from which he later derived two orchestral suites, Opp. 46 (1888), 55 (1891)
- 1948 music by Harald Sæverud, Op. 28

- Pelléas and Mélisande (Maurice Maeterlinck, 1893)

- 1898 music by Gabriel Fauré, Op. 80
- 1905 music by Jean Sibelius, Op. 46

- The Persians (Aeschylus, 472 BC)

- 1934 music by Marios Varvoglis
- 1940 music by Henri Sauguet

- Un petit ange de rien du tout (C. A. Puget)

- 1940 music by Darius Milhaud, Op. 215

- Phaëton, or Reckless Audacity (Joost van den Vondel, 1663)

- 1937 music by Willem Pijper

- La Pharmacienne (Jean Giraudoux)

- 1949 music by Henri Sauguet

- Phèdre (Jean Racine, 1677)

- 1900 music by Jules Massenet

- Philip II (Emile Verhaeren)

- 1918 music by Eugene Goossens, Op. 22

- Philoctetes (Sophocles, c. 409 BC)

- music by Alexander Ilyinsky (died 1920)

- Le Piège de Méduse (Erik Satie, 1913)

- music also by Erik Satie; sometimes described as an operetta

- La Pisanella (Gabriele d'Annunzio)

- 1913 music by Ildebrando Pizzetti

- Pizarro (Richard Brinsley Sheridan, 1799)

- music by Jan Ladislav Dussek (with Michael Kelly)

- Plutus (Jollivet, after Aristophanes, 380 BC)

- 1938 music by Darius Milhaud, Op. 186

- Polyeucte (Pierre Corneille, 1642)

- 1881 music by Edgar Tinel (an orchestral suite was produced in 1906)

- La Porte héroïque du ciel (Jules Bois, 1894)

- music by Erik Satie (Prélude, 1894)

- The Post Office (Rabindranath Tagore, 1912)

- music by Heinz Tiessen (died 1971)

- Preciosa (Pius Alexander Wolff, based on Miguel de Cervantes' La gitanella; 1821)

- 1820 music by Carl Maria von Weber, Op. 78, J. 279

- Prince Potemkin (Kniaź Patiomkin; Tadeusz Miciński, 1906)

- 1924 music by Karol Szymanowski, Op. 51

- The Princess of Cyprus (Zachris Topelius)

- music by Fredrik Pacius (died 1891)

- Princess Dandelion (Jaroslav Kvapil)

- 1897 music by Josef Bohuslav Foerster, Op. 35

- La Princesse Lointaine (Edmond Rostand, 1895)

- 1897 music by Gabriel Pierné

- Princess Maleine (La princesse Maleine; Maurice Maeterlinck, 1889)

- music by Lili Boulanger (died 1918; she also worked on an opera on the same subject, which was not finished)
- music by Maximilian Steinberg (died 1946)

- Prinz Friedrich von Homburg (The Prince of Homburg; Heinrich von Kleist, 1811)

- 1884 music by Hugo Wolf (unfinished)

- Prometheus Bound (Aeschylus, c. 415 BC)

- 1948 music by Norman Demuth

- Prometheus Unbound (Percy Bysshe Shelley, 1820)

- 1948 music by Norman Demuth
- music by Lars-Erik Larsson (died 1986)

- Protée (Paul Claudel)

- 1919 music by Darius Milhaud, Op. 17 (also 1955)
- 1955 music by Darius Milhaud, Op. 341 (also 1919)

== Q ==
- Le Quatorze Juillet (Romain Rolland, 1902)

- 1936 music by Georges Auric, Arthur Honegger, Jacques Ibert, Charles Koechlin, Lazarus, Darius Milhaud (Op. 153) and Albert Roussel

- Queen Mary (Alfred, Lord Tennyson)

- 1876 music by Charles Villiers Stanford, Op. 6

- Queen Tamara; Knut Hamsun, 1903)

- music by Johan Halvorsen (died 1935)

== R ==
- Rache des verhöbten Liebhabers (Ernst Toller)

- music by Ernst Krenek

- Raduz and Mahulena (Julius Zeyer)

- 1898 music by Josef Suk, Op. 13; rev. 1912; in 1900 he reworked the music as an orchestral piece, A Fairy Tale, Op. 16

- Ramuntcho (Pierre Loti, 1897)

- 1908 music by Gabriel Pierné

- Ravenswood (Herman Merrivale 1890, based on Sir Walter Scott's 1819 novel The Bride of Lammermoor)

- 1890 music by Sir Alexander Mackenzie, Op. 45

- Regina von Emmeritz (Zachris Topelius)

- music by August Söderman (died 1876)

- La Reine Fiammette (Catulle Mendès, 1898)

- music by Paul Vidal

- Le retour de l'enfant prodigue (André Gide, written 1907 as a novel)

- 1933 music by Henri Sauguet

- Rhesus (attrib. Euripides)

- 1922 music by Ernest Walker, Op. 35

- Richard III (William Shakespeare, c. 1591)

- music by August Söderman (died 1876)
- music by Robert Volkmann (died 1883; overture, Op. 68; interludes, Op. 73)

- The Robbers (Friedrich Schiller, 1781)

- 1782 music by Franz Danzi
- 1919 music by Yuri Shaporin
- music by Vissarion Shebalin

- Romeo and Juliet (William Shakespeare, c. 1595)

- 1890 music by Francis Thomé
- 1907 music by Engelbert Humperdinck
- music by Wilhelm Stenhammar (died 1927)
- 1936 music by Darius Milhaud, Op. 161 (S. Jollivet, after Jouve, after Shakespeare)
- music by Richard Strauss (died 1949)
- music by Franz Salmhofer (died 1975)
- music by Anatoly Nikolayevich Alexandrov (died 1982)

- Rosamunde (Helmina von Chézy, 1823)

- music by Franz Schubert, Op. 26, D. 797

- The Royal Hunt of the Sun (Peter Shaffer, 1964)

- music for original production by Marc Wilkinson

- The Ruins of Athens (August von Kotzebue)

- 1811 music by Ludwig van Beethoven, Op. 113, including the Turkish March
- 1924 Richard Strauss made his own arrangement of Beethoven's music

- Ruy Blas (Victor Hugo)

- 1839 music by Felix Mendelssohn

== S ==
- St. Jakob an der Birs (C.A. (August) Bernoulli)

- music by Hermann Suter, Op. 13

- Salome (Oscar Wilde, 1893)

- 1918 music by Sir Granville Bantock ("Dance of the Seven Veils")
- music by Flor Alpaerts (died 1954)
- music by Alexander Tcherepnin (died 1977)

- La Samaritaine (Edmond Rostand, 1897)

- music by Gabriel Pierné

- Samson (Jaroslav Vrchlický)

- 1906 music by Josef Bohuslav Foerster, Op.62

- Saül (André Gide, 1903)

- 1954 music by Darius Milhaud, Op. 334

- Scaramouche (Poul Knudsen; tragic pantomime)

- 1913 music by Jean Sibelius, Op. 71 (first performed 1922)

- The School for Scandal (Richard Brinsley Sheridan, 1777)

- 1940 music by Henri Sauguet (play adapted by Claude Spaak as L'École de médisance)
- music by Dmitri Kabalevsky (died 1987)

- The Searcher (Velona Pilcher)

- 1930 music by Edmund Rubbra

- The Seven Ages of Man (Montagu Slater)

- 1938 music by Benjamin Britten

- Snefrid (Holger Drachmann)

- 1893 music by Carl Nielsen, FS. 17; rev. 1899

- The Snow Maiden (Snegurochka, Aleksandr Ostrovsky, 1873)

- 1873 music by Pyotr Ilyich Tchaikovsky, Op. 12
- music by Alexander Gretchaninov, Op. 23

- The Spanish Student (Henry Wadsworth Longfellow, 1843)

- music by Charles Villiers Stanford (died 1924)

- Der Spiegelmensch (Franz Werfel)

- music by Wilhelm Grosz, Op. 12

- The Starlight Express (Violet Peam, 1915)

- music by Edward Elgar

- The Stone Guest (Alexander Pushkin, 1830)

- music by Vissarion Shebalin

- Swanwhite (Svanevhit; August Strindberg)

- 1908 music by Jean Sibelius, Op. 54

- Sweeney Agonistes (T. S. Eliot, 1932)

- music by Quincy Porter

== T ==
- Tartuffe (Molière, 1664)

- 1929 music by Yuri Shaporin
- 1950 music (fanfares) by Henri Sauguet

- The Tempest (William Shakespeare, 1611)

- original music by Robert Johnson
- c. 1695 music by Henry Purcell, Z. 631 (semi-opera)
- 1855 music by Wilhelm Taubert
- 1862 music by Arthur Sullivan, Op. 1
- 1882 music by Frank Van der Stucken
- 1888 music by Ernest Chausson
- 1915 music by Engelbert Humperdinck
- 1918 music by Felix Weingartner, Op. 65
- 1921 music by Arthur Bliss
- 1926 music by Jean Sibelius, Op. 109
- 1930 music by Willem Pijper
- 1946 music by Lennox Berkeley
- music by Heinz Tiessen (died 1971)
- music by Franz Salmhofer (died 1975)

- Thamos, King of Egypt (Thamos, König in Ägypten; Tobias Phillip, 1774)

- 1773-1780 music by Wolfgang Amadeus Mozart

- Théodora (Victorien Sardou, 1884)

- music by Jules Massenet

- This Way to the Tomb (Ronald Duncan, 1945)

- music by Benjamin Britten

- Timon of Athens (William Shakespeare, before 1623)

- music by August Söderman (died 1876)

- Toad of Toad Hall (A. A. Milne, 1929; based on Kenneth Grahame's book The Wind in the Willows)

- music by Harold Fraser-Simson

- To Damascus (trilogy, a.k.a. Till Damascus; August Strindberg, 1898–1902)

- 1927 music by Ture Rangström

- Part III.

- 1916 music by Emil von Reznicek

- Der Tor und der Tod (Hugo von Hofmannsthal, 1891)

- 1908 music by Josef Bohuslav Foerster, Op. 75

- Tordenskjold (Jacob Breda Bull)

- music by Johan Halvorsen, Op. 18 (died 1935)

- The Trachiniae (Sophocles)

- 1932 music by Ildebrando Pizzetti

- The Trojan Women (Euripides, 415 BC)

- 1940 music by Virgil Thomson

- Tsar Boris (Aleksey Konstantinovich Tolstoy, 1870)

- 1899 music by Vasily Kalinnikov

- Tsar Fiodor Ioannovich (Aleksey Konstantinovich Tolstoy, 1868)

- music by Alexander Ilyinsky (died 1920)

- Tsongor és Tünde (a.k.a. Csongor és Tünde; Mihály Vörösmarty)

- 1903 music by Leo Weiner, Op. 10
- 1941 music by Ferenc Farkas

- Turandot (Carlo Gozzi, 1762)

- 1809 music by Carl Maria von Weber, Op. 37 (for the 1801 translation Turandot, Prinzessin von China by Friedrich Schiller)
- 1905 music by Ferruccio Busoni (used for the adaptation and translation by Karl Vollmöller produced in 1911 by Max Reinhardt)
- music by Wilhelm Stenhammar (died 1927)

- Twelfth Night (William Shakespeare, c. 1601)

- 1885 music by Charles-Marie Widor (to a French version, Conte d'avril)
- 1907 music by Engelbert Humperdinck
- music by Wilhelm Stenhammar (died 1927)

- Twigs (George Furth, 1971)

- music by Stephen Sondheim

== U ==
- Under the Apple Trees (Pod jabloni; Julius Zeyer)

- 1902 music by Josef Suk, Op. 20; produced 1934

- Die unheilbringende Krone (Ferdinand Raimund)

- music by Josef Rheinberger

== V ==
- Verschwender (Ferdinand Raimund)

- music by Conradin Kreutzer

- Die versunkene Glocke (Gerhart Hauptmann, 1897)

- music by Wilhelm Grosz, Op. 35

- Volpone (Ben Jonson, 1606)

- music by Mátyás Seiber (to a German version translated by Stefan Zweig

- Le voyageur sans bagage (Jean Anouilh, 1937)

- 1937 music by Darius Milhaud, Op. 157
- 1944 music by Francis Poulenc

- The Voyevoda (A Dream on the Volga) (Aleksandr Ostrovsky): see A Dream on the Volga

== W ==
- Wallensteins Lager (Friedrich Schiller)

- 1800 music by Johann Philipp Christian Schulz

- War and Peace (Leo Tolstoy, novel, 1865–1869)

- music for a dramatic adaptation by Clifton Parker (died 1989)

- The Wasps (Aristophanes, 422 BC)

- 1909 music by Ralph Vaughan Williams

- Where the Rainbow Ends (Clifford Mills and John Ramsey, 1911)

- music by Roger Quilter

- The Widow from Valencia (Lope de Vega)

- music by Aram Khachaturian

- Wilhelm Tell (Friedrich Schiller, 1804)

- 1806 music by Franz Danzi
- music by Carl Reinecke (died 1910)
- 1926 music by Paul Müller, Op. 13
- music by Lars-Erik Larsson (died 1986)

- The Winter's Tale (William Shakespeare, 1594–1611)

- 1906 music by Engelbert Humperdinck
- music by Nikolay Sokolov, Op. 44 (died 1922)
- 1950 music by Darius Milhaud, Op. 306 (C. A. Puget, after Shakespeare)

- The Wood Nymph (Josef Kajetán Tyl)

- music by Karel Kovařovic (died 1920)

- Woyzeck (Georg Büchner, 1836; unfinished, completed by others)

- music by Mátyás Seiber (died 1960; as Wozzeck)

== X ==
- Xantho chez les courtisanes (Jean Richepin)

- music by Xavier Leroux

== Y ==
- Yelva (Eugène Scribe)

- 1832 music by Albert Lortzing
