= Lorenz Johann Jakob Lang =

Lorenz Johann Jakob Lang (10 May 1731 – 18 September 1801) was a German theologian, born in Selb, in the principality of Baireuth on 10 May 1731. He was the son of a stocking-maker, and being destined by his father to follow the same trade, he contended in his desire for study, which he early manifested, with many difficulties. By the assistance of his pastor, however, he acquired a thorough knowledge of the Latin and Greek, and entered in 1743 the lyceum at Culmbach. Indefatigable in his industry, he became thoroughly versed in philosophy and theology, as is evinced in the disputations De praestantia philosophiae Wolfianae, and De pontifice coelesti Novi Testamenti, after the defense of which he entered the University of Erlangen in 1751. After quitting Erlangen, he went to Baireuth in 1756 as tutor. A few months later he became subrector in Baireuth. In 1758 he was appointed professor of the Oriental languages and of the fine arts at the Gymnasium of Baireuth. In 1767 he was appointed court librarian, and in 1789 the first professor and inspector of the alumni, and in 1795 the first counsellor. He died on 18 September 1801.

Lang wrote extensively, but most of his writings are in the form of dissertations. A complete list is given by Doring, Gelehrte Theol. Deutschlands, volume 1, s.v
