= August von Kotzebue =

German dramatist and writer (1761–1819)

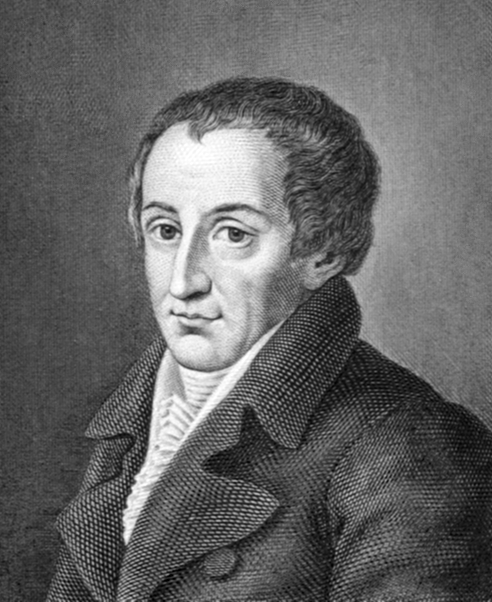
- Born: August Friedrich Ferdinand Kotzebue; 3 May 1761; Weimar, Duchy of Saxe-Weimar
- Died: 23 March 1819 (aged 57); Mannheim, Grand Duchy of Baden
- Resting place: Mannheim
- Education: University of Duisburg
- Occupation: Writer
- Writing career
- Language: German

Signature
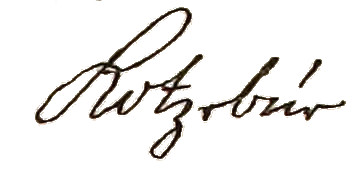

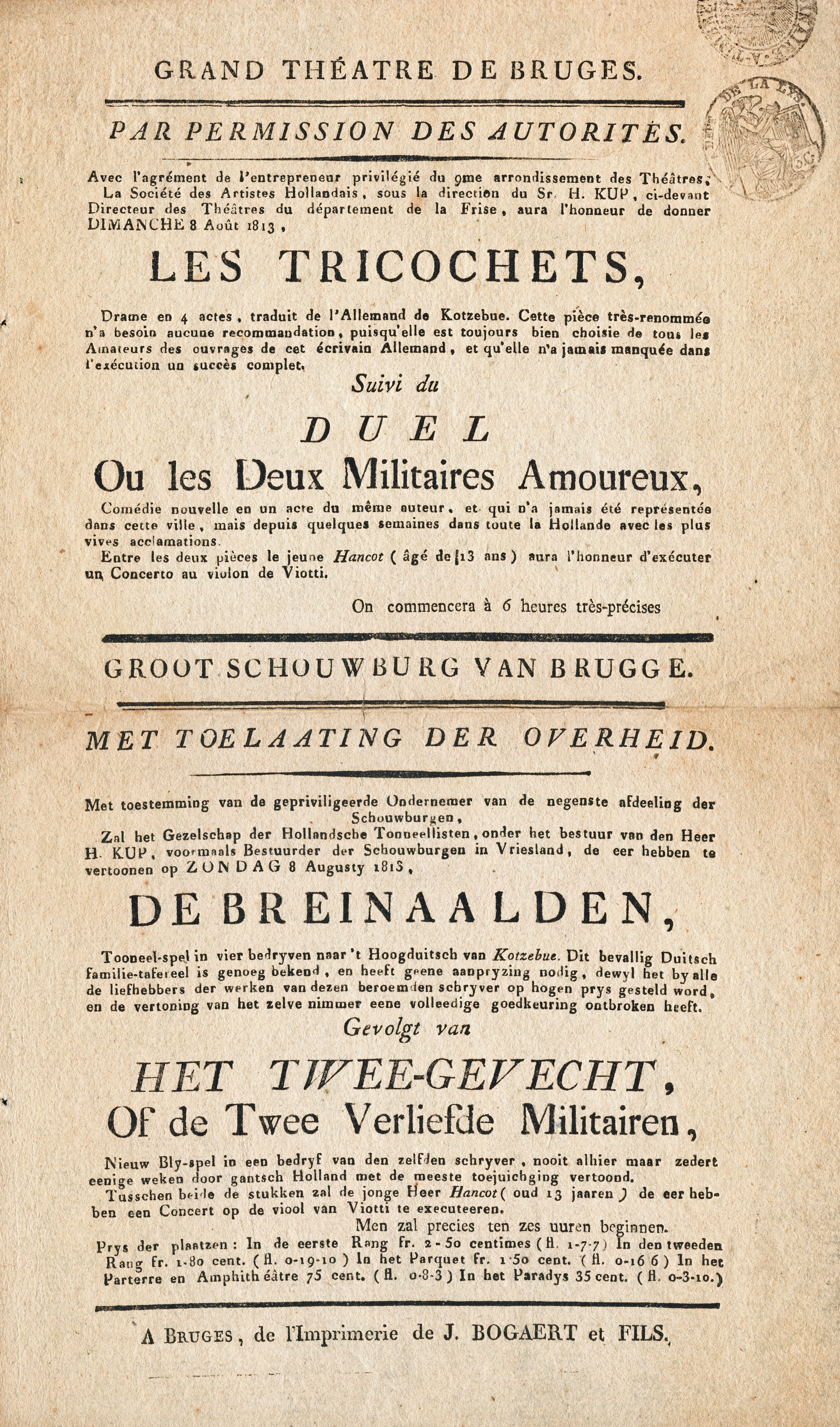
Announcement of two pieces by August von Kotzebue performed at the theater of Bruges on 8 August 1813

August Friedrich Ferdinand von Kotzebue (German: [ˈaʊɡʊst fɔn ˈkɔtsəbuː]; Russian: Евстафий Леонтьевич Коцебу, romanized: Yevstafiy Leontyevich Kotsebu; 3 May [O.S. 22 April] 1761 – 23 March [O.S. 11 March] 1819) was a German playwright, who had also worked as a Russian diplomat.

In 1817, one of Kotzebue's books was burned during the Wartburg festival. He was murdered in 1819 by Karl Ludwig Sand, a militant member of the Burschenschaften. This murder gave Metternich the pretext to issue the Carlsbad Decrees of 1819, which dissolved the Burschenschaften, cracked down on the liberal press, and seriously restricted academic freedom in the states of the German Confederation.

== Life ==
Kotzebue was born on May 3, 1761 in Weimar, Saxe-Weimar, to the respected merchant Kotzebue family and was educated at Wilhelm-Ernst-Gymnasium in Weimar, where his uncle, the writer and critic Johann Karl August Musäus, was among his teachers. In 1776 the young Kotzebue acted alongside Goethe in the latter's play Die Geschwister when it premiered in Weimar. In 1777, aged sixteen, he enrolled at the University of Jena to study legal science. He continued his studies at the University of Duisburg, graduating in 1780, and practiced initially as a lawyer in Weimar.

Through his association with Graf Goertz, Prussian ambassador at the Russian court, Kotzebue became secretary to the Governor General of Saint Petersburg. In 1783 he was appointed assessor to the high court of appeals in Reval, where he married the daughter of a Russian lieutenant general. He was ennobled in 1785 and became president of the Magistrat of the Governorate of Estonia, a province of the Russian Empire.

In Reval his first literary works were favourably received. His novels Die Leiden der Ortenbergischen Familie (The Sorrows of the Ortenberg Family) (1785) and Geschichte meines Vaters (History of my Father) (1788) met with appreciation; even more so did his plays Adelheid von Wulfingen (1789), Menschenhass und Reue (Misanthropy and Repentance) (1790) and Die Indianer in England (The Indians in England) (1790).

The good reputation of these works was, however, almost destroyed by a controversial dramatic satire, Doktor Bahrdt mit der eisernen Stirn (Doctor Bahrdt with the Iron Brow), which appeared in 1790 with the name of Knigge on the title page. Written in response to contention between Johann Georg Ritter von Zimmermann and leaders of Berlin's party of the Enlightenment, it linked each of Zimmermann's opponents to a particular sexual perversion. Kotzebue denied authorship, even when the police began to investigate the matter. This alienated both Zimmermann and Knigge, formerly his allies, and also gained Kotzebue a reputation for dishonesty and lasciviousness that he would never shake off.

After the death of his first wife in 1790, Kotzebue retired from the Russian service and lived for a time in Paris and Mainz. In 1795 he settled on an estate which he had acquired near Reval and devoted himself to writing. In the space of only a few years, he published six volumes of miscellaneous sketches and stories (Die jüngsten Kinder meiner Laune, 1793–1796) and more than twenty plays, many of which were translated into several European languages.

In 1798 he was appointed dramatist to the court theatre in Vienna, but differences with the actors soon obliged him to resign. He then returned to his native town, but as he was not on good terms with the powerful Goethe and had openly attacked the romantic style for which Goethe was known, his position in Weimar was uncomfortable.

In April 1800 he decided to return to Saint Petersburg, but on his journey there he was arrested at the border on suspicion of being a Jacobin and was escorted to Tobolsk in Siberia. On June 11, 1800, he was sent from Tobolsk to Kurgan, where he arrived 6 days later. However, he had written a comedy which flattered the vanity of Emperor Paul I of Russia; he was soon brought back, presented with an estate in Vooru from the crown lands of Livonia, have received rank of court councillor, and appointed director of the German theatre in Saint Petersburg. On July 7, 1800, he left Kurgan. Kotzebue wrote about this period in his life in the autobiographical Das merkwürdigste Jahr meines Lebens (The strangest Year of my Life).

Kotzebue returned to Germany in 1801, after the assassination of the Emperor Paul I. Failing to establish himself in Weimar's literary circles, he moved to Berlin, where he edited Der Freimutige in collaboration with Garlieb Merkel from 1803 to 1807. In 1803 he began his Almanach dramatischer Spiele (Almanac of the Dramatic Arts), which was published posthumously in 1820.

In 1806, after Napoleon's victory in the Battle of Jena-Auerstedt, Kotzebue fled to Russia and, in the safety of his estate in Jerlep, Estonia, wrote many satirical articles against Napoleon Bonaparte, published in his journals Die Biene (The Bee) and Die Grille (The Cricket).

He started working for the department of foreign affairs in Saint Petersburg in 1816 and was sent to Germany as consul general for Russia a year later. Some suspected him of being a spy, and this view persisted for a long time, but in modern times it has been shown to be unfounded: he reported only on matters that were already public knowledge. Nevertheless, it is fair to say he was Russia's advocate in Germany.

== Assassination ==
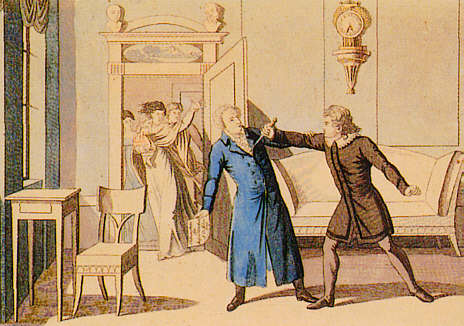
Stabbing of Kotzebue

In a weekly journal (Literarisches Wochenblatt) which he published in Weimar, he scoffed at the pretensions of those Germans who demanded free institutions, and soon became detested by nationalist liberals. One of them, Karl Ludwig Sand, a theology student, plotted to kill him. On 23 March 1819, soon after Kotzebue had moved with his family to Mannheim, Sand attacked Kotzebue at his house. According to Alexandre Dumas, père, when one of Kotzebue's children appeared and started to cry, Sand became overwrought and stabbed himself.

Sand was arrested and carefully nursed back to health. At his trial, he protested that Kotzebue was an enemy of the German people, but he was convicted of the murder and executed later that year.

The assassination of Kotzebue provided Prince Metternich with arguments to convince the Confederation to enact the Carlsbad Decrees, imposing greater restrictions on universities and the press. After the death of Kotzebue, Ernst Ackermann remained as the sole editor of the Literarisches Wochenblatt.

== Work ==
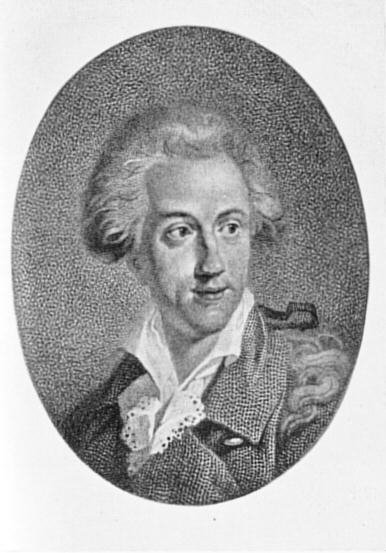
Portrait of Kotzebue in Weimar

Though he was unfavourably reviewed by critics – many of whom saw his work as immoral – Kotzebue was one of the most popular writers of his time. In his essay "Why Do I Have So Many Enemies?" ("Woher kommt es, daß ich so viele Feinde habe?"), he blamed jealousy of his fame. He was politically conservative but cosmopolitan in outlook, criticizing the German nationalist student movement. He also defended the Jewish writer Saul Ascher against antisemitic attacks by German nationalists, although his support for Jewish civil rights remained conditional on conversion to Christianity.

He was approached in 1812 by Beethoven, who suggested that Kotzebue write the libretto for an opera about Attila, which was never written. Beethoven did, however, produce incidental music for two of Kotzebue's plays, The Ruins of Athens (Beethoven's opus 113) and King Stephen (opus 117).

Besides his plays, Kotzebue wrote several historical works: his History of the German Empires was burned by nationalist students at the 1817 Wartburg Festival (which Sand attended).

Still read are his autobiographical writings, Meine Flucht nach Paris im Winter 1790 (1791), Über meinen Aufenthalt in Wien (1799), Das merkwürdigste Jahr meines Lebens (1801), Erinnerungen aus Paris (1804), and Erinnerungen von meiner Reise aus Liefland nach Rom und Neapel (1805).

As a dramatist, his plays numbered over 200, and were known throughout Europe. His success, however, was seen as due less to any conspicuous literary or poetic ability than to his great facility in the invention of effective situations. His more well known works were comedies such as Der Wildfang, Die beiden Klingsberg and Die deutschen Kleinstädter, which contain cameos of German life. These plays held the stage in Germany long after the once-famous Menschenhass und Reue (Misanthropy and Repentance, but known in England as The Stranger), Graf Benjowsky, and ambitious exotic tragedies like Die Sonnenjungfrau and Die Spanier in Peru (which Sheridan adapted as Pizarro) were forgotten.

Theatre historians usually consider the runaway success of The Stranger, the English version of Menschenhass und Reue, in both England (where it opened in 1798) and the United States as one of the harbingers of the emerging popularity of theatrical melodrama, which dominated European and American stages for the first seventy-five years of the nineteenth century.

Two collections of Kotzebue's dramas were published during his lifetime: Schauspiele (5 vols., 1797); Neue Schauspiele (23 vols., 1798–1820). His Sämtliche dramatische Werke appeared in 44 volumes in 1827–1829, and again, under the title Theater, in 40 volumes in 1840–1841. A selection of his plays in 10 volumes appeared in Leipzig in 1867–1868. See Heinrich Doring, A. von Kotzebues Leben (1830); W. von Kotzebue, A. von Kotzebue (1881); Ch. Rabany, Kotzebue, sa vie et son temps (1893); W. Sellier, Kotzebue in England (1901).

== Legacy ==
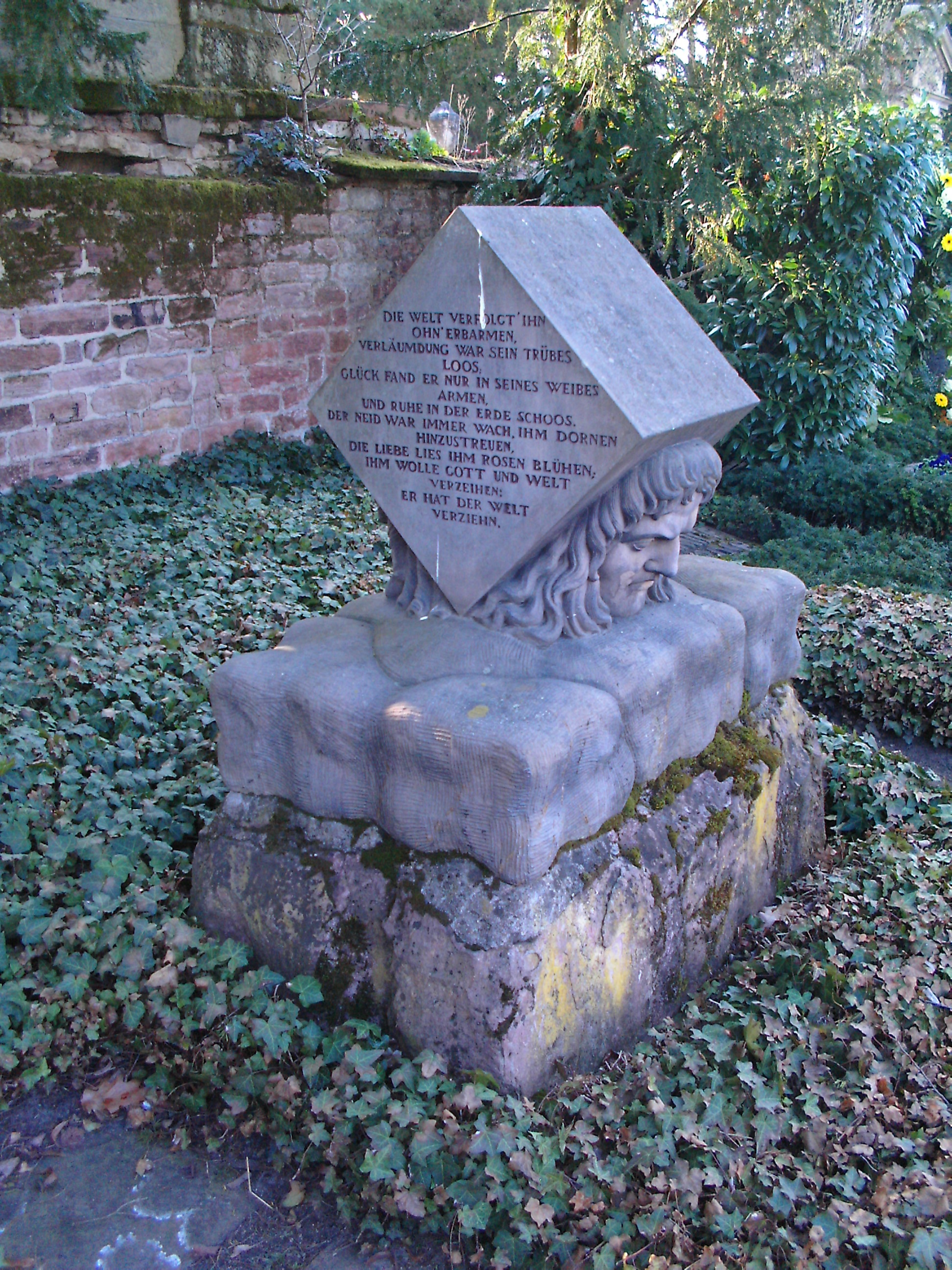
The tomb of August von Kotzebue in Mannheim

Kotzebue was the father of 18 children, among them Karl von Kotzebue (diplomat), Moritz von Kotzebue, Paul Demetrius Kotzebue, Alexander Kotzebue and the explorer Otto von Kotzebue.

Kotzebue Street in Kalamaja, Tallinn, Estonia, is named after him and other family members who lived on the street, especially his son Otto.

Rejected Addresses (1812) by Robert and Horace Smith, contains a "travestie" parody of The Stranger.

Beethoven's "Turkish March", originally written as part of the incidental music to von Kotzebue's The Ruins of Athens, became one of this composer's most well-known pieces.

Jane Austen saw a Kotzebue play, The Birthday, at Bath in 1799. In her novel Mansfield Park she used a version of another of his plays, Das Kind der Liebe, adapted by Elizabeth Inchbald as Lover's Vows (1798).

== Sources ==
- "Коцебу, Август Фридрих Фердинанд" . Brockhaus and Efron Encyclopedic Dictionary (in Russian). 1906.
