= The Fountain of Bakhchisaray =

1824 poem by Alexander Pushkin

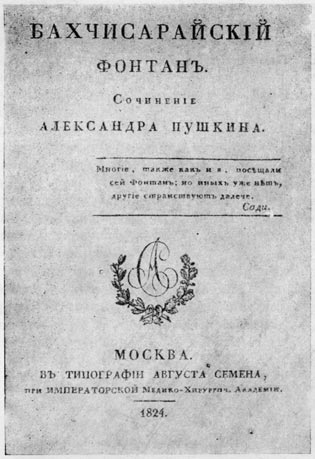
First publication

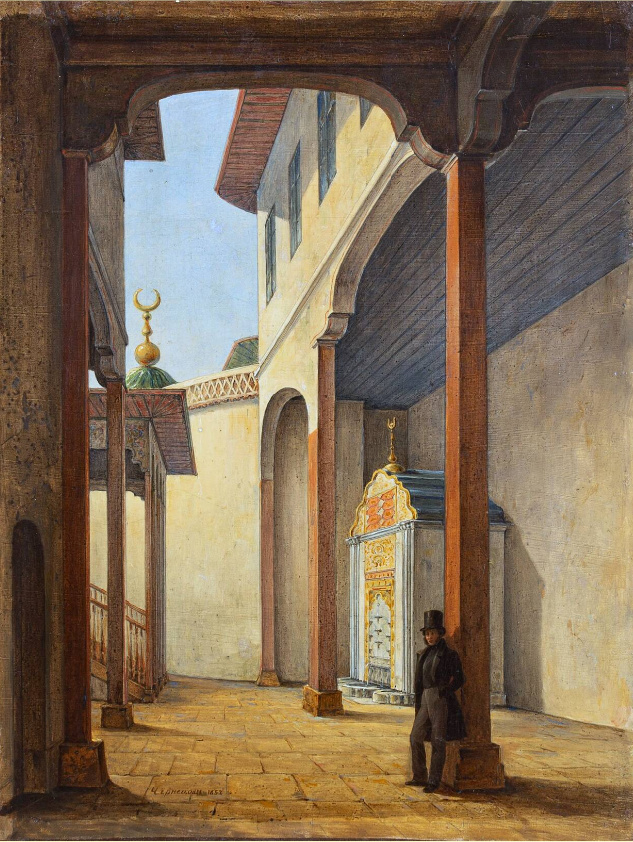
Alexander Pushkin in Bakhchysarai Palace. Painting by Grigory Chernetsov.

The Fountain of Bakhchisaray (Russian: Бахчисарайский фонтан, Bakhchisaraiskiy fontan) is a narrative poem by Alexander Pushkin, written from 1821 to 1823.

Pushkin began writing The Fountain of Bakhchisaray in the spring of 1821, after having visited The Fountain of Tears at the Bakhchysarai Palace in 1820. The bulk of the poem was written during 1822. In spring 1823, the entry draft was completed. During the autumn of 1823, Pushkin made his final changes to the poem and prepared it for printing. The first edition of The Fountain of Bakhchisaray was published on 10 March 1824.

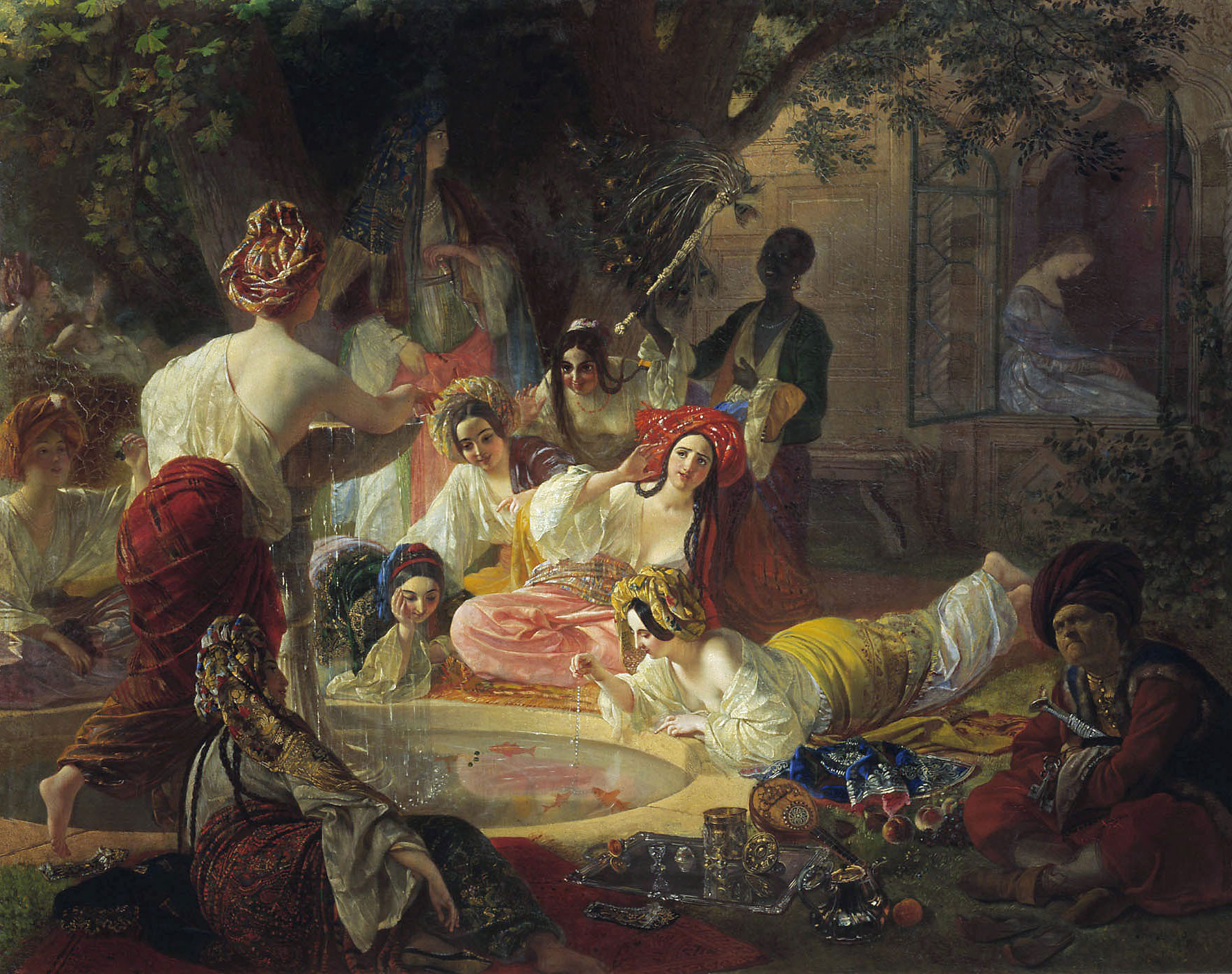
The Fountain of Bakhchisarai (Bakhchisaraiskiy fontan, 1838–1849), by Karl Briullov (1799–1852).

The poem has inspired multiple works. In 1899, composer Anton Arensky wrote a five-part cantata, including an aria for Zarema. In 1909–1910, a short film based on the poem was created by Yakov Protazanov. In 1934, Boris Asafyev composed a ballet of the same name, also inspired by Pushkin's work, and Alexander Ilyinsky composed an opera in 1911 based on the poem. Alexander von Zemlinsky's 1897 opera Sarema is based on the poem and takes its name from one of its characters. In the 1840s, artist Karl Briullov painted a painting on the subject.

== Plot ==
In the harem of the Crimean khan Giray, one of the concubines, the Georgian Zarema, is sad because the khan has fallen out of love with her. His mind is occupied by Maria, a Polish nobleman's daughter who was kidnapped during one of the Tatars' raids. Maria is inconsolable and spends all her time in prayer to the Virgin Mary. She prefers death to the fate of a non-believer's concubine. At night, Zarema enters Maria's room and tries to convince her with threats to reject the khan so that he will regain his love for Zarema. Soon after, Maria dies, and Zarema is drowned by the guards of the harem.

The khan leaves the harem and goes to war to forget his troubles, but he is still tormented. After his return, he orders a fountain to be erected in the palace in memory of Maria, which the young maidens of Crimea, having learned of this sad legend, call the "fountain of tears".

In an epilogue, the narrator recounts how he wandered through the abandoned palace of Bakhchisaray. He saw a woman's ghost and wondered if it was Maria's or Zarema's. He recalls a love for whom he yearns, then contemplates on the beauty of Crimea and wishes to return there.

== Analysis ==
The poem is made up of 578 lines and is written in freely rhymed iambic tetrameters. Pushkin scholar Sergei Bondi writes:

The poem most closely resembles the canon of Romantic poems with its fragmentary form, the sometimes deliberate incoherence of the story, some deliberate ambiguity of content (for example, the fate of Zarema and Maria), the lyricism that permeates the entire poem, and the special musicality of the verse. In this respect, The Fountain of Bakhchisaray is a remarkable phenomenon: the musical selection of sounds, the melodic flow of speech, the extraordinary harmony in its development, and the alternation of poetic images and pictures distinguish this poem from all of Pushkin's poems.

Regarding the characters of the poem, Bondi considers the character of Khan Giray to be underdeveloped, but he views Zarema as an improvement over the Circassian heroine of Pushkin's The Prisoner of the Caucasus. He describes the exchange between Zarema and Maria as "unusually diverse in its feelings, tone and content".

Pushkin himself spoke almost only negatively about his poem. He wrote to Pyotr Vyazemsky in October 1823, "The Fountain of Bakhchisaray, between us, is rubbish, but its epigraph is charming". Elsewhere, he described the epigraph—a quotation from the Persian poet Saadi—as better than the entire poem. However, he considered the exchange between Zarema and Maria to "have dramatic merit".
