= Marios Varvoglis =

Greek composer

Marios Varvoglis (Greek: Μάριος Βάρβογλης; 10 December 1885 – 30 July 1967) was a Greek composer.

Varvoglis was born in Brussels. He studied music at the Conservatoire de Paris and the Schola Cantorum with Leroux, Georges Caussade, d'Indy and others. He remained in Montparnasse, Paris until 1922 and he maintained close relations with artistic circles that included Casella, Ravel, Varèse and Modigliani, whose last painting was a portrait of Varvoglis. After 1920 he taught at the Athens Conservatory and he became active as a music critic and conductor. He was persecuted for his liberal political views and he was imprisoned in a British concentration camp during the Dekemvriana

He died in Athens.

== Music ==
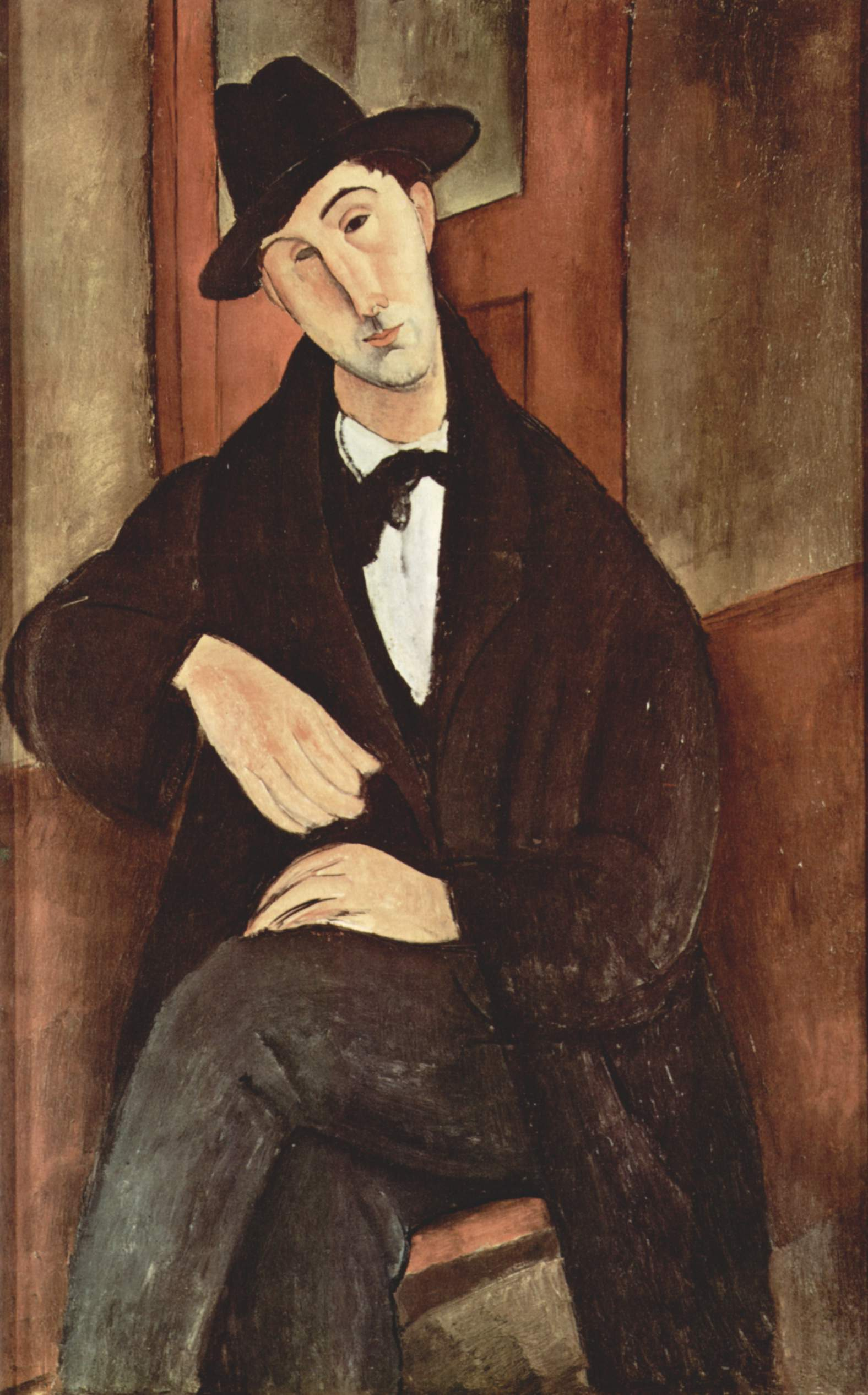
Portrait of Mario Varvogli by Amedeo Modigliani (1919)

Varvoglis' music belongs to the Greek national school, but was also influenced by the French style. His works include:

Stage

- St. Barbara (1912)
- The Afternoon of Love (1944)
- Long live Messolonghi, for solo English horn and strings (1933)

Incidental music

- Agamemnon (Aeschylus; 1932)
- The Persians (Aeschylus; 1934)
- The Birds (Aristophanes; 1942)
- Medea (Euripides; 1942)
- The Oath of the Dead (Zacharias Papantoniou; 1938)

Orchestral works

- The Feast (1906–9)
- Pastoral suite for strings (1912)
- Capriccio (1914)
- Canon, Chorale and Fugue on BACH (1930)
- Prelude, Chorale and Fugue on BACH (1937)
- Meditation for strings (1938)
- Laurels and Cypresses (1950)
- Symphonic poem Behind the Barbed Wire Fence (1945)

Chamber

- Doll's Serenade (1905)
- Pastoral Suite (1912)
- Hommage a César Franck (violin and piano; 1922)
- Trio for strings (1938)
- Piano Trio (1943)
- Prelude and Fugue on a Byzantine Theme (1953)

Piano

- Children's Hour, 14 pieces (1930)
- Greek Rhapsody (1922)
- Sonatina (1927)

Other

- songs
