= Ernst Christian Wilhelm Ackermann =

Ernst Christian Wilhelm Ackermann (14 June 1761, in Weimar – 4 October 1835, in Jena) was a German public servant and writer.

He studied in Leipzig and Jena between 1779 and 1782, and was a childhood friend of August von Kotzebue. In the following years, he worked as judiciary auditor under his father in Ilmenau, and later as private lecturer. In 1790, he became adjunct and when his father died in 1792, Ernst Ackermann took his place as judiciary bailiff. Ackerman resigned when Ilmenau was annexed to Weimar and economic conditions became less favourable. Consequently, he was assigned Privy Referendar at the Ministry of Justice where he stayed until 1826, when he retired.

Ackermann made a large number of anonymous contributions to different journals. After the death of Kotzebue, he remained the sole editor of the Literarisches Wochenblatt.
