= August Söderman =

Swedish composer (1832–1876)

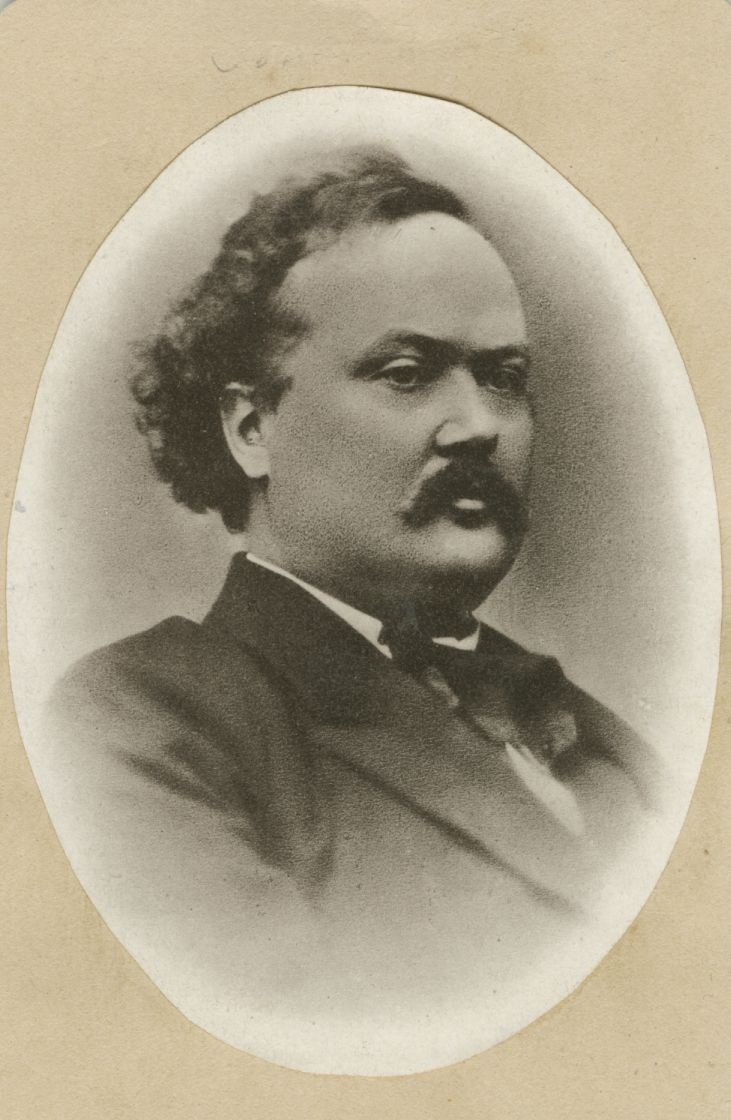
Johan August Söderman

Johan August Söderman (17 July 1832 – 10 February 1876) was a Swedish composer. He was born and died in Stockholm, and has traditionally been seen as the pre-eminent Swedish composer of the Romantic generation, known especially for his lieder and choral works, based on folk material, and for his theatre music, such as the incidental music to Ludvig Josephson's Marsk Stigs döttrar ("Marshal Stig's Daughter"), 1866, or his Svenskt festspel ("Swedish Festival Music").

== Biography ==
The son of a musical father and a pupil of the Royal Swedish Academy in Stockholm, he studied piano, but mastered the oboe and violin as well. In 1856–57 he studied counterpoint at the Leipzig Conservatory with Ernst Richter; there, in a musical culture that bore the imprint of Mendelssohn, he became familiar with the music of Robert Schumann and also with that of Richard Wagner. On his return to Stockholm he worked as a theatre conductor, and at the Royal Swedish Opera as choirmaster and eventually assistant conductor.

He wrote several operettas (The Devil's First Try, 1856) and incidental music for about 80 plays, such as a Swedish translation of Schiller's Die Jungfrau von Orleans ("The Maid of Orleans"). His influence can be detected in the music of later Swedish Romantic composers, Hugo Alfvén and Wilhelm Peterson-Berger.

Söderman died aged 43. His music is virtually unknown outside Sweden.

== List of works ==
=== Orchestral music ===
- Concert overture in F major, 1855? –1868
- Chariveripolka, 1848
- Intermezzo (Sailors' Lives), 1850s
- Burlesque, 1855
- Scherzo (sketch), 1856
- Swedish festival, 1858, originally overture to A few hours at Kronoborg Castle and the Virgin of Orleans
- Swedish folk songs and folk dances, possibly identical to Nordic folk songs and folk dances, printed posthumously in 1897
- Festmarsch, 1869
- Bellman melodies, printed 1870
- Sorgmarsch in C minor, 1871
- Charles XV's mourning march in E minor, 1872
- Festpolonäs in A major, 1873
- Festmarsch in E flat major, 1873

=== Works for choir and orchestra (selected) ===
Söderman composed a large amount of vocal works for different choruses or solo voice. Selected works are listed below. For a full list, see the Swedish-language article.

- An die Freude (Friedrich von Schiller), for male choir and orchestra, 1859
- Tempelsalen (Temple Hall) (E Wallmark, for male choir and orchestra), 1863
- Die Wallfahrt nach Kevlaar (The Pilgrimage to Kevlaar) (Heinrich Heine) for baritone, choir and orchestra, 1859–66
- Signefills färd (Signefill's journey) (Ludvig Josephson) for soloists, choir, and orchestra, 1869
- Das Heidelberger Fess (Friedrich von Hagedorn) for bass, male choir and piano, 1869
- Hjertesorg (Heartbreak) (Karl Wetterhoff) for soprano, mixed choir and orchestra, 1870, orchestrated by Ludvig Norman
- Spiritual songs for mixed choir and organ, printed 1872
  - Kyrie
  - Agnus Dei
  - Jesus Christ
  - Domine
  - Benedict
  - Virgo Gloriosa
  - Osanna
- Catholic Mass for soloists, mixed choir, and orchestra, 1875

=== Chamber music ===
- Piano Quartet in E minor, 1856

=== Music for piano ===
- Fantasier à la Almqvist, 1868
- Cherkassy dance, 1871
