= Paul Delair =

French playwright (1842–1894)

- Born: Paul Alexandre Delair; 24 October 1842; Montereau-Fault-Yonne, France
- Died: 19 January 1894 (aged 51); Paris, France
- Occupations: Poet; Playwright; Chansonnier

Paul Alexandre Delair (24 October 1842 – 19 January 1894) was a 19th-century French playwright, poet, chansonnier and novelist.

An administrator at the Académie des Beaux-Arts, he took an active part to the organization of the Exposition universelle of 1889. His plays were presented on the most important Parisian stages of the 19th-century, including the Théâtre du Vaudeville and the Comédie-Française.

== Works ==
- 1868: La Découverte, ode sur la navigation
- 1870: Les Nuits et les réveils
- 1872: L’Éloge d'Alexandre Dumas
- 1872: La Voix d'en haut, one-act à-propos dramatique, in verse
- 1879: La Louve d'Alençon, historical novel
- 1880: Théâtre de campagne
- 1880: Garin, five-act drama, in verse
- 1881: Le Fils de Corneille, à propos in verse
- 1882: Le Fils du charpentier, tale in verse
- 1883: Les Rois en exil, 5-acts play, in 7 tableaux, with Alphonse Daudet
- 1884: Le Centenaire de Figaro, à-propos in verse
- 1884: Les Contes d'à présent avec une lettre de Coquelin aîné sur la poésie dite en public et l'art de la dire
- 1885: Apothéose, one-act play in verse
- 1885: Louchon
- 1887: Délivrance, cantata, music by Théodore Dubois
- 1887: Rabelais à Molière, verse
- 1891: Hélène, drama in 4 acts, incidental music by André Messager
- 1891: La Mégère apprivoisée, four-act comédie lyrique
- 1891: L’Âme des fleurs !, poetry, incidental music by Jules Massenet
- 1893: La Vie chimérique, poems
- 1894: Chanson d'automne, music by André Messager
- 1895: Testament poétique, poésies posthumes, with Sully Prudhomme
- 1897: Chansons épiques (Geste de Guillaume)
- 1898: Chanson d'hiver !, music by C. de Grandval
- 1898: Parfums des tilleuls !, poetry, music by Clémence de Grandval
- 1899: Théâtre inédit
- 1899: Ma belle m'a dit, poetry, music by Charles Cuvillier
- 1903: Illusion !, lamento, music by Flégier
- 1905: Musique d'antan, music by Cuvillier
- 1908: L'Ile des fleurs !, melody, singing and piano, music by Ange Flégier

== Bibliography ==
- Ferdinand-Camille Dreyfus, André Berthelot, La Grande encyclopédie, vol.13, 1886, (p. 1161)
- Gérard Walch, Anthologie des poètes français contemporains, 1916, (p. 53)
- Robert Sabatier, Histoire de la poésie française du XIXe, vol.2, 1977, (p. 82)
- Jacques Delair, Paul Delair (1842-1894), undated
