= Heinz Tiessen =

German composer (1887–1971)

Richard Gustav Heinz Tiessen (10 April 1887 – 29 November 1971) was a German composer.

== Biography ==
Tiessen was born at Königsberg, where he studied with composer Erwin Kroll before moving to Berlin. There, he enrolled at Humboldt University and at the Stern'sches Konservatorium, where he studied composition and music theory. He worked as a music critic for Allgemeine Musikzeitung from 1911 to 1917 before becoming a theater Kapellmeister and composer for Volksbühne in 1918. From 1920 to 1922, he conducted the Akademische Orchester and between 1925 and 1945, he taught music theory and composition at the Berliner Musikhochschule. He also co-founded the German division of the International Society for Contemporary Music and served as conductor of the Junger Chor. During the Third Reich, his music was classified as "undesirable" by the Nazi authorities, and after World War II, he almost completely stopped composing. From 1946 to 1949 he directed the city Konservatorium and beginning in 1955, he headed the department of composition and theory at the Berliner Musikhochschule. His best-known pupils were Eduard Erdmann and Sergiu Celibidache, another one was Eva Siewert. He died in Berlin.

Tiessen composed two symphonies, a dance drama and incidental music for a number of plays, some Music for String Orchestra, a Totentanz-Suite for small orchestra, chamber works, pieces for piano and organ, lieder, and choral music. The music of Richard Strauss, who in 1917 had helped Tiessen obtain a job at the Berlin State Opera, influenced much of his early works: the First Symphony is dedicated to Strauss. From 1918 onwards his musical idiom inclined more towards an individual form of Expressionism, to which his many theatre scores contributed in evolving a highly dramatic, free-form style.

== Works ==
- Symphony No. 1 in C, 1910–11
- Symphony No. 2 "Stirb und Werde", op.17, 1911–12
- Natur-Trilogie for piano, op.18 1913
- Amsel-Septett (Blackbird Septet), op.20 1914-15
- Hamlet-Suite, 1919–21
- Incidental music for Merlin by Karl Leberecht Immermann
- Incidental music for Die armseligen Besenbinder by Carl Hauptmann
- Incidental music for The Post Office by Rabindranath Tagore
- Incidental music for Antigone by Sophocles
- Incidental music for Masse Mensch by Ernst Toller
- Incidental music for Hamlet by William Shakespeare, op.30
- Incidental music for Cymbeline by Shakespeare
- Incidental music for Advent by August Strindberg
- Incidental music for The Tempest by Shakespeare
- Three Pieces for Piano, 1923
- String Quintet, op.32
- Salambo, dance drama, op.34 1924
- Incidental music for Abenteuer in Moll by Hanns Braun, 1924
- Duo-Sonate for violin and piano, 1925
- Incidental music for Don Juan und Faust by Christian Dietrich Grabbe, 1925
- Vorspiel zu einem Revolutionsdrama, op.33 1926
- Incidental music for Musik by Hauptmann, 1934
- Concertante Variations for Piano and Orchestra, 1961
