= Alexander Ilyinsky =

Russian music teacher and composer (1859–1920)

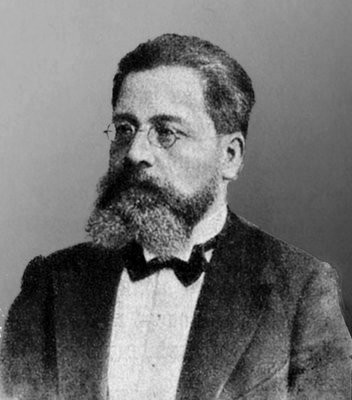
Alexander Ilyinsky

Alexander Alexandrovich Ilyinsky (Russian: Алекса́ндр Алекса́ндрович Ильи́нский; 24 January [O.S. 12 January] 1859 – 23 February 1920) was a Russian music teacher and composer, best known for the Lullaby (Berceuse), Op. 13, No. 7, from his orchestral suite "Noure and Anitra", and for the opera The Fountain of Bakhchisaray set to Pushkin's poem of the same name.

== Life ==
Alexander Ilyinsky was born in Tsarskoye Selo, Russia, in 1859. His father was a physician in the Alexander Cadet Corps. His general education was in the First Cadet Corps at St Petersburg, and he served in the Artillery from 1877 to 1879. His music studies were in Berlin, under Theodor Kullak and Natanael Betcher at the Berlin Conservatory, and under Woldemar Bargiel at the Neue Akademie der Tonkunst. He returned to Russia in 1885, graduated from the St Petersburg Conservatory, and taught at the Moscow Philharmonic Society School of Music and Drama. He resigned in 1899 and started giving private lessons. In 1905, he joined the staff of the Moscow Conservatory. His students included Vasily Kalinnikov, Anatoly Nikolayevich Alexandrov, Nikolai Roslavets, Elena Stanekaite-Laumyanskene, and the Finnish composer Väinö Raitio.

His major work, the 4-act opera The Fountain of Bakhchisaray, to a libretto based on Alexander Pushkin's poem, was produced in Moscow in 1911. He also wrote a symphony, a Concert Overture, a string quartet, three orchestral suites, a set of orchestral Croatian Dances, a symphonic movement called Psyche, two cantatas for female chorus and orchestra (Strekoza (The Dragonfly) and Rusalka), incidental music to Sophocles' Oedipus Rex and Philoctetes, and to Aleksey Konstantinovich Tolstoy's Tsar Fiodor Ioannovich, piano pieces, church music, songs, etc. His name is perhaps most familiar to music students for his Lullaby from the third orchestral suite (sometimes described as a ballet), "Noure and Anitra", Op. 13, which excerpt has appeared in many different arrangements.

Alexander Ilyinsky also wrote "A Short Guide to the Practical Teaching of Orchestration" (1917), which remained in use long after his death. In 1904 there appeared under his editorship "Biographies of all Composers from the Fourth to the Twentieth Century". He edited the complete piano works of Beethoven for a commercial publication.

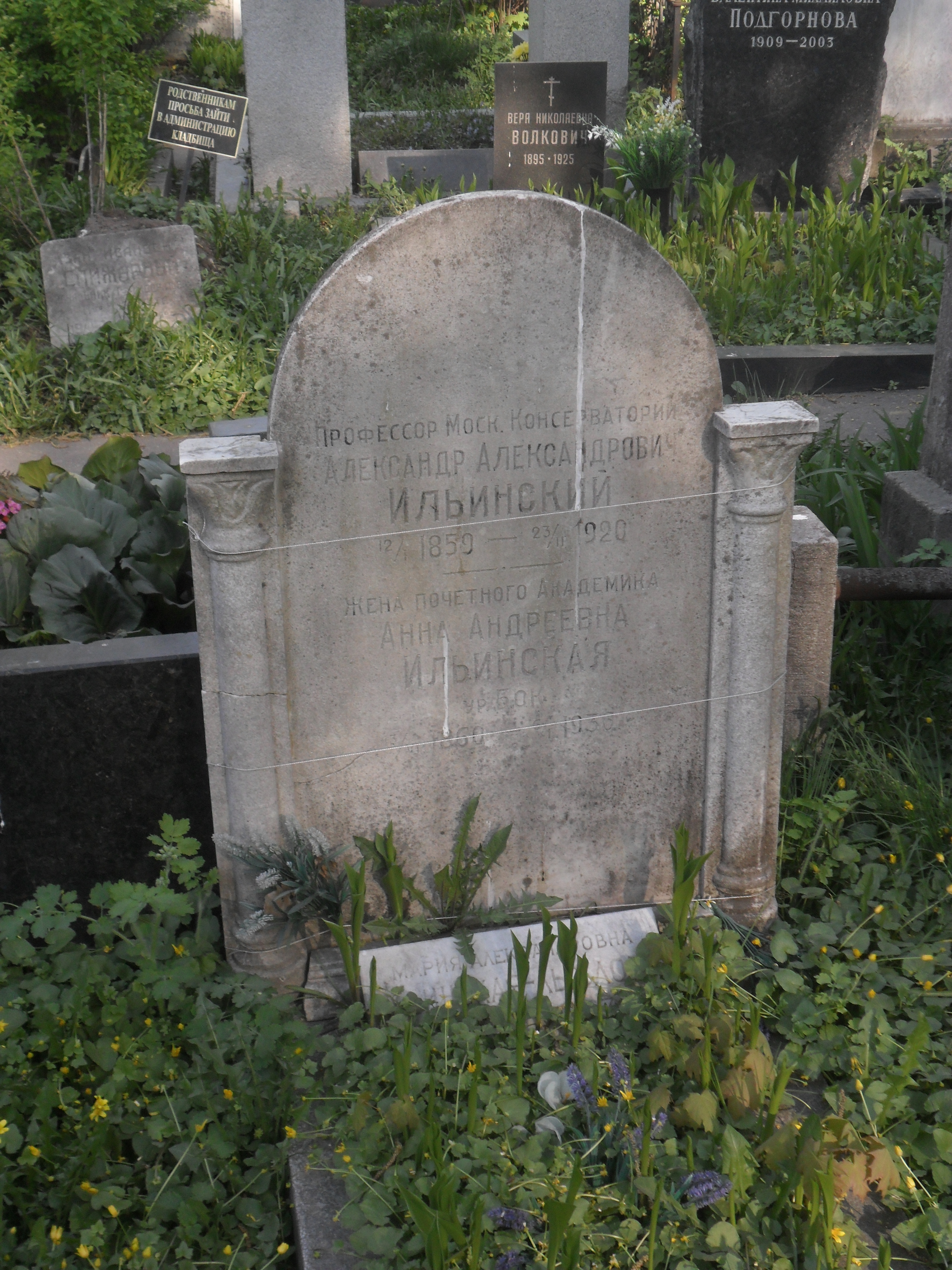
The grave of composer Alexander Ilyinsky at Novodevichy Cemetery in Moscow.

He died in 1920 in Moscow.

Orgy of the Spirits, an excerpt from The Fountain of Bakhchisaray, was used in the scores of the film East of Java (1935), as well as the adventure serials Tim Tyler's Luck (1937) and Flash Gordon's Trip to Mars (1938). It was also used as the theme music for the radio serial The Witch’s Tale.

== Sources ==
- "Ильинский, Александр Александрович" . Brockhaus and Efron Encyclopedic Dictionary (in Russian). 1906.
- Grove's Dictionary of Music and Musicians, 5th, 1954, Eric Blom, ed.
