= Hélène (drama) =

Drama in four acts and five tableaux

Hélène is a drame in four acts and five tableaux of 1891, with French words by Paul Delair and incidental music by André Messager.

The story, found by the author in the fait divers of a newspaper concerns a child, Hélène, who, learning that her father has been murdered by his mother, swears vengeance; there are shades of Hamlet. Starting with a first act march for returning soldiers, the authors of the Annales praised Messager's incidental music, despite echos of Gounod, Thomas and particularly Bizet and his L'Arlésienne.

The play was first performed at the Théâtre du Vaudeville on 15 September 1891, running for only 16 performances. The cast included Brandès in the title role, Adolphe Candé, Marie Sammary, Laroche and André Michel, and the orchestra was conducted by Gabriel-Marie.
