= King Stephen (Beethoven) =

Composition by Ludwig van Beethoven

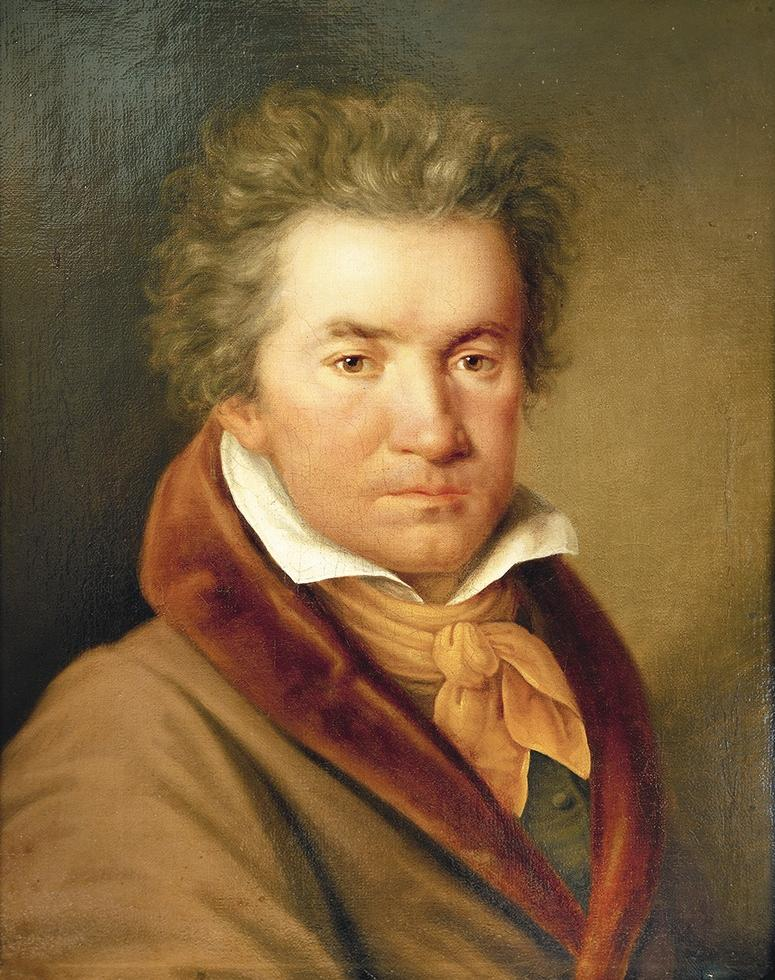
Ludwig van Beethoven (age 44) depicted in a portrait by Joseph Willibrord Mähler (1815)

King Stephen, Op. 117 (König Stephan) is a commemorative work composed by Ludwig van Beethoven in 1811. It includes an overture in E♭ major and nine vocal numbers. Only the overture is usually played today. The title refers to King Stephen I, founder of the Kingdom of Hungary in the year 1000.

In 1808, Emperor Francis I of Austria commissioned the construction of a large theatre at Pest in response to growing Hungarian nationalism and to reinforce the loyalty of Hungary to the Austrian Habsburg monarchy. The theatre was opened in 1811, but Beethoven's incidental music premiered on February 9, 1812, when two commemorative plays written by August von Kotzebue, König Stephan (King Stephen) and Die Ruinen von Athen (The Ruins of Athens), were first performed.

== Movements ==
1. Overture (Andante con moto – Presto, E♭ major)
2. Male chorus: Ruhend von seinen Thaten (Andante maestoso e con moto, C major)
3. Male chorus: Auf dunkelm in finstern Hainen Wandelten (Allegro con brio, C minor)
4. Victory march (Feurig und stolz, G major)
5. Female chorus: Wo die Unschuld Blumen streute (Andante con moto all'Ongarese, A major)
6. Melodrama (Stéphan): Du hast dein Vaterland
7. Chorus: Eine neue strahlende Sonne (Vivace, F major)
8. Melodrama (Stéphan): Ihr edlen Ungarn! (Maestoso con moto, D major)
  - a. Religious March (Moderato, B♭ major)
  - b. Melodrama with chorus: Heil unserm Konige! (Allegro vivace e con brio, in various keys, starting in B♭ major)
9. Final chorus: Heil! Heil unserm Enkeln (Presto, D major)

== Instrumentation ==
SATB choir
piccolo (second male chorus only)
2 flutes
2 oboes
2 clarinets in A, B♭ and C
2 bassoons
contrabassoon (overture only)
4 horns in various keys
2 trumpets in C, D and E♭
3 trombones (alto, tenor and bass)
timpani
1st violins
2nd violins
violas
cellos
double basses
