= The Alchemist (Handel) =

Incidental music by G. F. Händel

The Alchemist, HWV 43, is incidental music used for the revival of Ben Jonson's play The Alchemist at the Queen's Theatre, London on 14 January 1710. The work is an arrangement, by an anonymous composer, of music written by George Frideric Handel.

All but one of the movements were taken from the extended overture to Handel's first Italian opera Rodrigo. The overture introduced the play and the other movements were used to fill the gaps between acts.

The incidental music was published in full a few months after the first performance; however, it is unlikely that Handel received any payment for either the performance or publication of the music. It is likely that the work was the first of Handel's music to be performed in England.

A typical performance takes almost 15 minutes.

== Movements ==
The work has the following movements:

	Type
I	Overture
II	Prelude (by an anonymous composer)
III	Minuet
IV	Sarabande
V	Bourree
VI	Air
VII	Minuet
VIII	Gavotte
IX	Gigue
