= Franz Salmhofer =

Austrian musician (1900–1975)

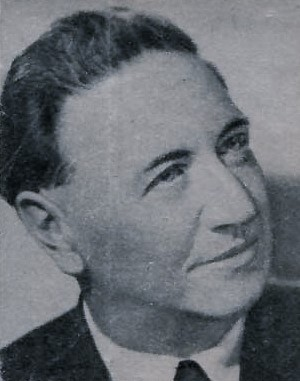
Franz Salmhofer c1953 whilst Director of the Vienna State Opera

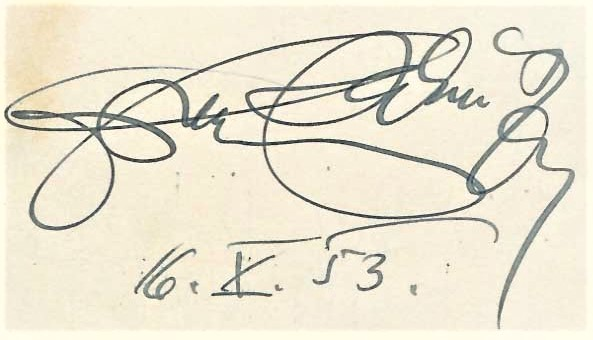
Signature of Franz Salmhofer

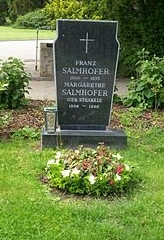
Grave of Salmhofer

Franz Salmhofer (22 January 1900 – 22 September 1975) was an Austrian composer, clarinetist and conductor. He studied the clarinet, composition and musicology in Vienna. Salmhofer served successively as Kapellmeister of the Burgtheater, Director of the Vienna State Opera and Director of the Vienna Volksoper and composed a number of works, few of which are played today.

== Biography ==
Born in Vienna, Austria, Salmhofer came from a modest background, his father being a pianist and his mother a cook. His father became an invalid following service in the First World War and his son had to use his musical talent to assist in providing for the family. Salmhofer was educated at the Admont Abbey in the province of Styria from 1909-1914, where he was a choirboy, and in 1916 went on to study musicology, clarinet and composition at the Institute for Musicology at the University of Vienna where he was a pupil of Franz Schreker, Franz Schmidt and Guido Adler. He was part of a class that included Ernst Krenek, Wilhelm Grosz, Karol Rathaus, Joseph Rosenstock, Max Brand (composer), Friedrich Wilckens, Paul Pisk and Jascha Horenstein. Thereafter he worked as a choir conductor and organist. In 1929 he was appointed Kapellmeister of the Burgtheater where he served until 1945 when he became the first post-war Director of the Vienna State Opera, a post he filled until 1953. In this position he worked at several temporary locations until the war-damaged Opera House could be restored. Thereafter he was Director of the Vienna Volksoper until his retirement in 1963.

=== Director of the State Opera ===
Salmhofer's appointment as the post-War Director of the Vienna State Opera in 1945 came as somewhat of a surprise, but can be attributed to several factors. His predecessor, Karl Böhm, a friend of Joseph Goebbels, had been removed due to his Nazi sympathies. Salmhofer had not been a Nazi sympathiser and his works had come close to being banned during that period. In addition he had had to protect his first wife whose background did not comply with the Nazi race laws. His time at the Burgteater had also given him wide experience in managing a theatre and he had a considerable reputation as a composer and musician and was known for his fervent love of Austria, an advantage during the period of revival of national identity. The first post-war performance of the Staatsoper, Mozart's Figaro, took place at the Volksoper under the baton of Salmhofer and at the request of the Russian occupying forces on 1 May 1945.

As a director he was able to revive the theatre that had been damaged during allied bombing of Vienna and which was temporarily relocated to the Theater an der Wien, where it remained for the following decade.

=== Personal life ===
In 1923 he married the pianist and fellow student at the Music Academy, Margit Gál who, after marrying him shifted her focus from her own career to tramscribing his notes and producing his scores. After her death in March 1954, was married to Margarethe Arndt from 1955 until his death in 1975.

== Music ==
During his lifetime Salmhofer wrote over 300 works for stage, working mainly in the genres of ballet and opera. He could be termed a 'late romantic' as he took romanticism as a starting point and frequently drew inspiration from folk traditions. Some also regarded him as a 'progressive', but he was careful to avoid controversial themes that in the political mood of the 1930s and 1940s could have led to sanction of his works and, like many others of his generation, immigration or exile from his home country. He was one of the most widely performed composers of his generation. His 1951 setting of Karl Heinrich Wagger's poems, Heiteres Herbarium, as songs is said to stand out among his works, but are 'a largely unknown masterpiece' of which the 1956 recording by Julius Patzak, with Salmhofer accompanying him on the piano, is the best known recording.

== List of major compositions ==
- Opera: Faust (1927)
- Ballet: Das Lockende Phantom (1927)
- Ballet: Der Taugenichts in Wien (1930)
- Ballet: Das Weihnachtsmärchen (1931)
- Ballet: Österreichische Bauernhochzeit (1933)
- Opera: Dame im Traum (1935)
- Film Score: Last Love (1935)
- Opera: Iwan Tarassenko - Version 1 (1938)
- Opera: Das Werbekleid Salzburg (1943)
- Film Score: Das andere Leben (1948)
- Opera: Iwan Tarassenko - Version 2 (1948)
- Film Score: Das Siegel Gottes (1949)
- Film Score: Der Wallnerbub (1950)
- Songs: Heiteres Herbarium (1951)
- Opera: Dreikönig (1970)

== Honours and awards ==
- City of Vienna Music Prize (1926 & 1960)
- Austrian State Prize for Composition (1937)
- Karl Renner Prize (1954)
- Silver Decoration of the state of Vienna (1960)
- Honorary Member of the Austrian Federal Theatre (1963)
- Federal Capital of Vienna Medal of Honour in gold (1965)
- Ring of Honour of the City of Vienna (1970)

=== Eponyms ===
Two places in Vienna bear Salmhofer's name:

- Salmhoferstraße (Inzersdorf area south of the city centre)
- Franz-Salmhofer-Platz (The square in front of the Volksoper).

== Bibliography ==
- Sadie S (ed), Wiesmann Sigrid: The New Grove Dictionary of Opera, London: Macmillan Reference (1992), ISBN 0-333-73432-7 and ISBN 1-56159-228-5
- Stokes R, "The Book of Lieder - The original texts of over 1000 songs", Faber & Faber (2005), ISBN 9780571224395
- Warrack J & West E, The Oxford Dictionary of Opera, New York: Oxford University Press (1992), ISBN 0-19-869164-5
- Hedwig & EH Mueller von Asow (eds), Deutscher Musiker-Kalender 1954, Berlin: Walter de Gruyter GmbH & Co, 1954, p. 1106
