= Heinrich Döring =

German writer, theologian and mineralogist (1789–1862)

Heinrich Doring, born Michael Johann Heinrich Döring (8 May 1789, Danzig/Gdańsk – 14 December 1862, Jena) was a German writer, theologian and mineralogist.

He became known mainly as a biographer of the German classical writers, and especially the first biographer of Goethe.

== Life ==
In 1814, after an interrupted business apprenticeship, Döring enrolled in the University of Jena. He studied theology and philosophy, and soon became active as a writer, falling under the influence of Goethe.

He became a member of the 'Society for General Mineralogy' (Gesellschaft für die gesamte Mineralogie) in Jena.

In 1817, he worked as an editor for the Oppositionsblatt newspaper in Weimar. After that, he worked primarily as a translator from English of such authors as James Fenimore Cooper, William Shakespeare, Walter Scott, and Laurence Sterne. He was also a literary historian, and biographer of various German writers.

His biographies were mainly based on the first-hand accounts by the persons he was writing about, as well as on other mostly reliable evidence.

== Works ==
=== As author ===
- Friedrich von Schillers Leben [The Life of Friedrich von Schiller]. (Galerie Weimarischer Schriftsteller; Bd. 1). Gebrüder Hoffmann, Weimar 1822.
- Johann Gottfried von Herder's Leben [The Life of Johann Gottfried von Herder]. (Herder, Sämtliche Werke. Supplement-Band). Hoffmann, Weimar 1823.
- Goethes Leben [The Life of Goethe], (Weimar, 1828)

=== As translator ===
- Supplemente zu allen Ausgaben Shakespeare's sämmtlicher Schauspiele [Translation of Shakespeare's plays], Übersetzt von Dr. Heinrich Döring, 2 Bnde, Hennings und Hopf, Erfurt 1840.
