= Incidental music =

Musical composition for a play

Incidental music is music in a play, television program, radio program, video game, or some other presentation form that is not primarily musical. The term is less frequently applied to film music, with such music being referred to instead as the film score or soundtrack.

Incidental music is often background music, and is intended to add atmosphere to the action. It may take the form of something as simple as a low, ominous tone suggesting an impending startling event or to enhance the depiction of a story-advancing sequence. It may also include pieces such as overtures, music played during scene changes, or at the end of an act, immediately preceding an interlude, as was customary with several nineteenth-century plays. It may also be required in plays that have musicians performing on-stage.

== History ==
The phrase "incidental music" is from the German Inzidenzmusik, which is defined in the Methuen Drama Dictionary of the Theatre as "music that is specifically written for a play but does not form an integral part of the work". The use of incidental music dates back to ancient Greek drama and possibly before the Greeks. A number of classical composers have written incidental music for various plays, with the more famous examples including Henry Purcell's Abdelazer music, George Frideric Handel's The Alchemist music, Joseph Haydn's Il distratto music, Wolfgang Amadeus Mozart's Thamos, King of Egypt music, Ludwig van Beethoven's Egmont music, Carl Maria von Weber's Preciosa music, Franz Schubert's Rosamunde music, Felix Mendelssohn's A Midsummer Night's Dream music, Robert Schumann's Manfred music, Georges Bizet's L'Arlésienne music, and Edvard Grieg's Peer Gynt music. Parts of all of these are often performed in concerts outside the context of the play. Vocal incidental music, which is included in the classical scores mentioned above, should not be confused with the score of a Broadway or film musical, in which the songs often reveal character and further the storyline. Since the score of a Broadway or film musical is what actually makes the work a musical, it is far more essential to the work than mere incidental music, which nearly always amounts to little more than a background score; indeed, many plays have no incidental music whatsoever.

Some early examples of what were later called incidental music are also described as semi-operas, quasi-operas, masques, vaudevilles and melodramas.

The genre of incidental music does not extend to pieces designed for concert performance, such as overtures named after a play, for example, Beethoven's Coriolan Overture (written for Heinrich Joseph von Collin's tragedy), or Tchaikovsky's Romeo and Juliet fantasy-overture.

Incidental music is also found in religious ceremony, often when officiants are walking from place to place. (This is distinguished from hymns, where the music is the focus of worship.) Incidental music is also used extensively in comedy shows for a similar purpose: providing mild entertainment during a dull transition. Comedy incidental musicians include Paul Schaffer, Max Weinberg, and Jon Batiste.

Modern composers of incidental music include Pierre Boulez, Lorenzo Ferrero, Irmin Schmidt, Ilona Sekacz, John White, and Iannis Xenakis.

== Types ==
=== Overture ===
An overture is incidental music that is played usually at the beginning of a film, play, opera, etc., before the action begins. It may be a complete work of music in itself or just a simple tune. In some cases it incorporates musical themes that are later repeated in other incidental music used during the performance.

=== Theme song ===
A theme song is a work that represents the performance and is often played at the beginning or end of the performance. Elements of the theme may be incorporated into other incidental music used during the performance. In films, theme songs are often played during credit rolls. A love theme is a special theme song (often in various modified forms) that accompanies romantic scenes involving the protagonists of a performance.

Theme songs are among the works of incidental music that are most commonly released independently of the performance for which they were written, and occasionally become major successes in their own right.

=== Underscore ===
An underscore is a soft soundtrack theme that accompanies the action in a performance. It is usually designed so that spectators are only indirectly aware of its presence. It may help to set or indicate the mood of a scene.

=== Stinger ===
A stinger is a very brief instant of music that accompanies a scene transition in a performance. Often the stinger marks the passage of time or a change in location. Stingers were used frequently in the American television series Friends, as an example, to mark scene changes.

=== Loop ===
Short sequences of recorded music called loops are sometimes designed so that they can be repeated indefinitely and seamlessly as required to accompany visuals. These are often used as background music in documentary and trade films.

== See also ==
- Diegesis, sections on the narrative uses of music in film and theatre
- Plays with incidental music
- Program music

== Bibliography ==
- Lamothe, Peter (2008). Theater music in France, 1864–1914 (Thesis). The University of North Carolina at Chapel Hill. ProQuest 304547910.
- Lubbock, Mark (March 1957). "Music Incidental to a Play". The Musical Times. 98 (1369): 128–131. doi:10.2307/936528. JSTOR 936528.
- Skinner, Frank (1950). Underscore: A Combination Method-Text-Treatise on Scoring Music for Motion Picture Films or T.V. Hollywood, California: Skinner Music Company – via archive.org.
