= Anton Hasenhut =

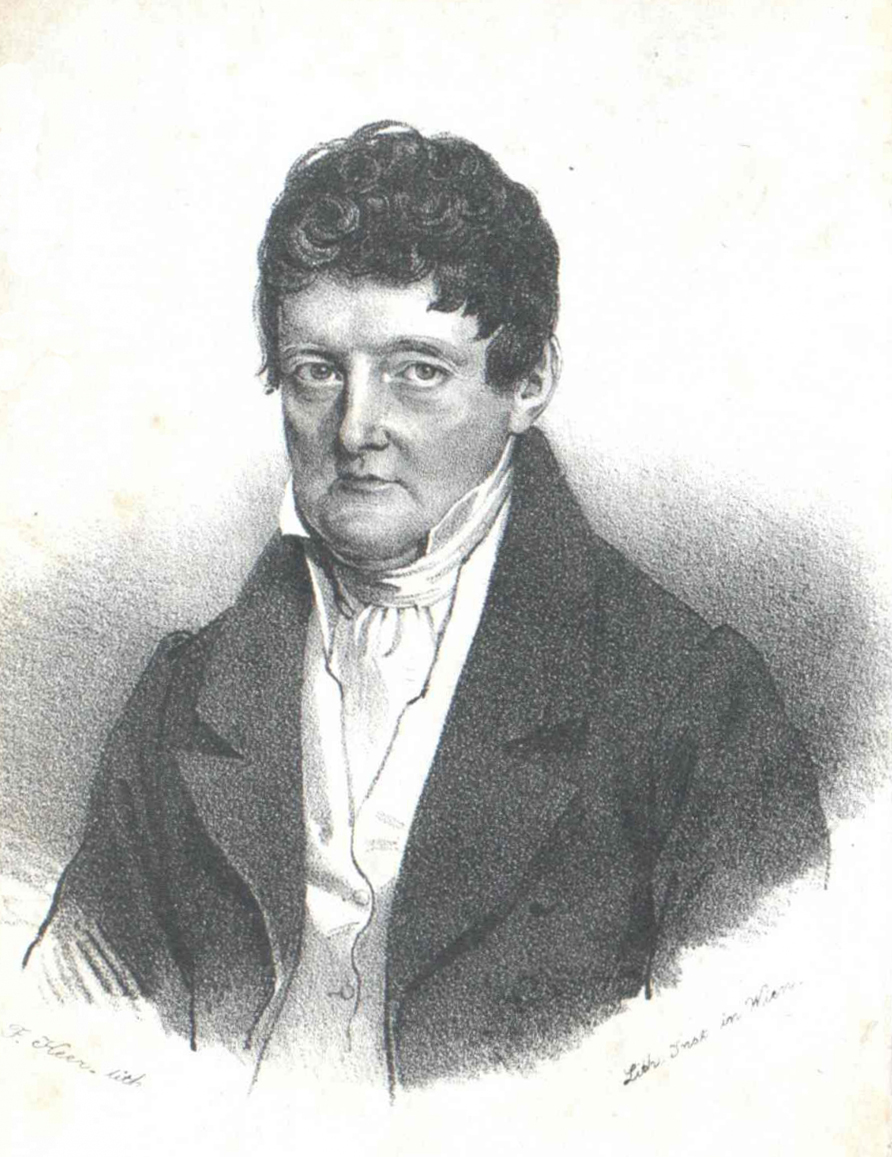
Lithograph by Faustin Herr

Anton Hasenhut (1 June 1766 – 6 February 1841) was an Austrian comic actor, known particularly for the character Thaddädl. He was in the theatre company of Karl von Marinelli and later of Emanuel Schikaneder.

== Life ==
Hasenhut was born in Petrovaradin (now in Serbia) in 1766. His father Joseph Hasenhut, originally a surgeon, left Vienna to become a member of a travelling theatre, and was its director by 1766.

Anton was the eldest of 15 children; there is a story that the affected squeaking or trumpeting voice, that he later used effectively in comic roles, was acquired as a child in imitation of his crying siblings. His first acting appearances were in his father's theatre company, and he was later a member of various companies in Brünn (Brno), Wiener Neustadt and Ödenburg (Sopron), playing foolish boys and comic servants.

In 1789 he was engaged by Karl von Marinelli at the Theater in der Leopoldstadt in Vienna. In the Singspiel Der Lebende Sack, by the composer Wenzel Müller and dramatist Karl Friedrich Hensler, he created the character Thaddädl, a role in which he soon became popular, Hensler adding a Thaddädl episode to subsequent plays at the theatre; it became part of the history of Alt-Wiener Volkstheater ("Old Viennese folk theatre"). Hasenhut stayed with the theatre until Marinelli's death in 1803.

=== Schikaneder's theatre company, and later years ===
From 1803 to 1819 he was in Emanuel Schikaneder's company at the Theater an der Wien, and appeared in many comic roles. Appearances included leading roles in Schikaneder's Anton der dumme Gärtner and Pfändung und Personalarrest, and the title role in Rochus Pumpernickel by Matthäus Stegmayer. Clemens Brentano wrote for him in 1813 the festive play Viktoria und ihre Geschwister.

During this period he made guest appearances in Munich, Frankfurt am Main, Darmstadt, Regensberg and elsewhere; in Berlin in 1817 he was a failure, leaving the city after one performance. After 1819 his successful years were over. He made guest appearances in provincial theatres, but failed to get a permanent position in Vienna. From 1825 to 1827 he was director of a theatre in Mödling.

Hasenhut died in poverty in Vienna in 1841, aged 74. The dramatist Franz Grillparzer wrote that the actor remained a memory of his earlier years; no comedian had ever again made him laugh so heartily as Hasenhut had done.
