= Gottlob Benedict Bierey =

German composer

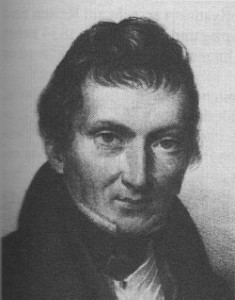
Gottlieb Benedict Bierey

Gottlob Benedict Bierey (25 July 1772 – 5 May 1840) was a German composer, Kapellmeister and Theatre tenant.

== Life ==
Born in Dresden, Bierey was a pupil of Christian Ehregott Weinlig. As soon as 1788, he became music director of the Döbbelinschen. From 1794 until 1806, he worked for Joseph Seconda in Dresden and Leipzig. In 1807 he made a guest appearance in Vienna, and from December 1807 until 1828 he worked as kapellmeister at the Wrocław Opera, where he succeeded Carl Maria von Weber and his successor Müller. From 1824 to 1828, Bierey also became a director of the municipal theatre there, but he came into constant conflict with Karl Schall, who opposed him in his Neue Breslauer Zeitung and vigorously opposed his allegedly unartistic and only money-making management. In Dresden, he was a member of the masonic lodge Zum goldenen Apfel.

At the time of Biery's, the baritone Johann Theodor Mosewius was also active in Wroclaw (1788-1858) and the comedians Heinrich Schmelka, Ludwig Wohlbrück and Fritz Beckmann. From 1829, Bierey privatized for health reasons in Wiesbaden, Mainz, Leipzig, Weimar.

With few exceptions, his compositions belong to the field of music theatre and consist, besides Lieder, a symphony (1801), a number of cantatas, choirs and songs for stage plays, preludes and 26 operas and operettas, most of which were popular in their time.

He wrote his opera Vladimir, Prince of Novgorod (1806), which led to his appointment to Breslau, for the Theater an der Wien. Especially lucky was a continuation of Ferdinand Kauer's Donauweibchen (part three) in 1801, 1811 the music for Zacharias Werner's play Die Weihe der Kraft and 1814 Almazinde oder die Höhle Sesam. Many of his operas suffered from weak texts and therefore did not last long, even though the music, which was sometimes accused of being too closely related to Luigi Cherubini, was praised and enjoyed listening to.

Biery's wife Sophie née Moreau and his daughter Wilhelmine worked as singers at times.

His nickname as a foreign member of the Vienna literary society Ludlamshöhle was "Rossini of Novgorod".

Bierey died in Breslau at the age of 67.

== Work ==
- Der Apfeldieb (Wilhelm Christian Häser), comic opera in 2 acts (1793 Leipzig)
- Liebesabenteuer oder Wer zuletzt lacht, lacht am besten (Gustav Friedrich Wilhelm Großmann), one-act comic opera (1794 Dresden)
- Der Mädchenmarkt (Karl Alexander Herklots), one-act comic opera (1794 Leipzig)
- Jery und Bätely (Johann Wolfgang von Goethe), comic opera (1795 Leipzig)
- Der Schlaftrunk (Christoph Friedrich Bretzner), two-act comic opera (1795 Ballenstedt)
- L’asilo d’Amore (Pietro Metastasio), cantata (1797)
- Der Zauberhain (1799)
- Das Donauweibchen oder Die Nixen-Königin. Third and last part. A romantic-comical folk tale with singing in 3 acts by Karl Friedrich Hensler in kauerscher (Dresden 1801)
- Das Blumenmädchen oder besser Die Rosenkönigin (Johann Friedrich Rochlitz), one-act comic opera (1802 Leipzig)
- Clara, Herzogin von Bretannien (Bretzner), opera in three acts (1803 Leipzig)
- Rosette, das Schweizer Hirtenmädchen (Bretzner), Singspiel in 2 acts (1806 Leipzig)
- Wladimir, Fürst von Nowgorod (Matthäus Stegmayer), opera in three acts (1807 Vienna, Theater an der Wien); 1828 Prague into Czech translation by S. K. Machacek
- Der Überfall (Bretzner), one-act comic opera (1808 Wien)
- Elias Rips Raps (Friedrich Wilhelm Häser), Intermezzo 1 act (1810 Breslau)
- Die Pantoffeln (Matthäus Stegmayer), opera in two acts (1811, Theater an der Wien)
- Die Gemsenjäger (Samuel Gottlieb Bürde), opera in two acts (1811 Breslau)
- Almazinde oder Die Höhle Sesam (Heinrich Schmidt), opera comique in three acts (1813 Vienna)
- Pyramus und Thisbe, Opera (1814 Breslau)
