= Therese Grünbaum =

Austrian opera singer

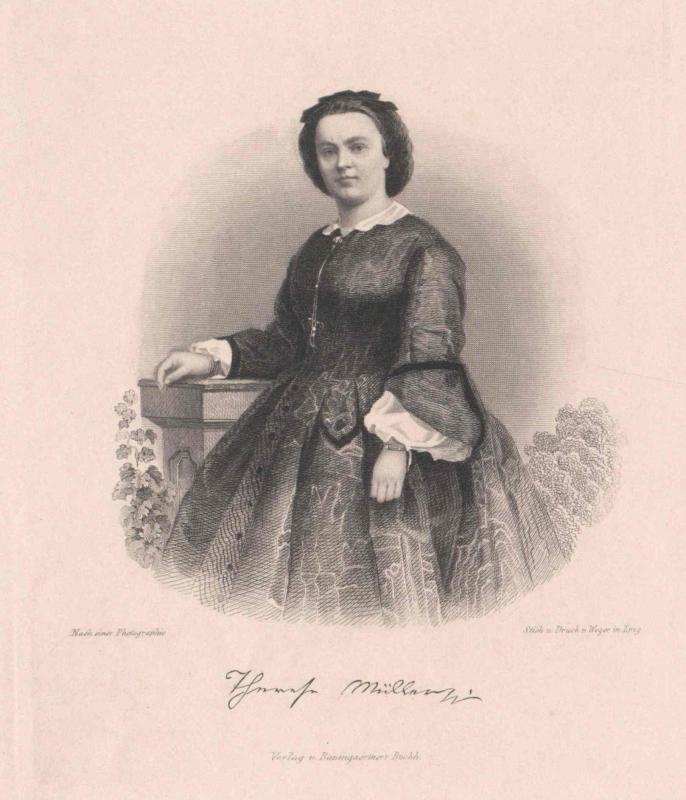
- Born: 24 August 1791; Vienna
- Died: 30 January 1876 (aged 84); Berlin
- Occupations: Soprano; opera singer
- Spouse: Johann Christoph Grünbaum
- Children: Caroline Grünbaum

Therese Grünbaum (24 August 1791 – 30 January 1876) was an Austrian soprano and opera singer.

== Life and career ==
Therese Grünbaum was born in Vienna to Austrian conductor and composer Wenzel Müller (1767–1835) and his first wife Magdalena Reinichsthal (1765–1794). Therese studied music with her father and made her stage debut in the part of Lilli in Ferdinand Kauer's Das Donauweibchen while still a child.

In 1807 Grünbaum took a position as a singer at the Prague Theater, and in 1815 Carl Maria von Weber composed a special scene and aria for her performance of the title role of Étienne Méhul's Héléna. In 1816 she moved back to Vienna, and in 1819 at the Kärntnertor Theater, she sang Desdemona in the Viennese debut performance of Gioachino Rossini's Otello. From 1818 to 1828, she sang at the Court Opera in Vienna. In 1823 she created the role of Eglantine in Weber's Euryanthe. She also sang guest roles in Munich (1827) and in Berlin (1828–1830).

After retiring from her concert career for health reasons, Grünbaum opened a music school in Berlin. She died in Berlin.

In 1813 Grünbaum married tenor Johann Christoph Grünbaum (1785–1870) and had two daughters (Caroline Grünbaum, 1814–1868, and Ottilia, 1816–1817) and two sons (Carl, b. 1815 and Joseph, b. 1816), all of whom became singers.
