= Op. 121 =

In music, Op. 121 stands for Opus number 121. Compositions that are assigned this number include:

- Beethoven, L. — Piano Trio Op. 121a (“Kakadu Variations”)
- Brahms – Vier ernste Gesänge
- Fauré – String Quartet
- Schumann – Violin Sonata No. 2
