= Stegmayer =

Stegmayer is a surname. Notable people with the surname include:

- Matthäus Stegmayer (1771–1820), Austrian composer
- Michael Stegmayer (born 1985), German footballer

== See also ==
- Stegmeyer
