= Theodor Mayer =

Theodor Mayer may refer to:

- Theodor Mayer (writer)
- Theodor Mayer (historian)
