= Stepan Davydov =

Russian composer (1777–1825)

Stepan Ivanovich Davydov (Russian: Степа́н Ива́нович Давы́дов, Ukrainian: Степа́н Іва́нович Давидів; January 12 [OS January 1] 1777 – May 21 [OS May 9] 1825 in Moscow) was an Imperial Russian composer and singer. He was born in Chernihiv in the Russian Empire (present-day Ukraine).

== Biography ==
When the principal choirboy of the Imperial Court Capella, he drew the attention of the Empress Catherine II, who consigned him to the care of the Italian composer Giuseppe Sarti (1729–1802).

Davydov wrote and published a complete four-part liturgy and 13 Spiritual Choral Concerti, three of which were written for a double chorus. In the field of secular music Davydov participated in the composing of opera tetralogy Mermaid (together with Ferdinand Kauer and Catterino Cavos, 1803–1807, providing the additional music for the 1st, 3rd and 4th parts). He also wrote 10 ballets, various divertissements, a series of choruses to the tragedy Amboar and Aurungzeb (1814), a concert overture and numerous other works.

He held the post of the Kapellmeister of the Imperial Theatres in St Petersburg (1806–1810). From 1810 he taught at the Theatrical School in Moscow.

== Operas ==
- Dneprovskaja rusalka (Днепровская русалка – A Mermaid of the Dnepr, Russian libretto by Nikolai Krasnopolsky after Karl Friedrich Hensler, Das Donauweibchen), opera in three acts, November 7 [OS 26 October] 1803, St Petersburg, Bolshoi Kamenny Theatre with Music by Ferdinand Kauer and the additional three numbers composed by Davydov.
- Lesta, dneprovskaja rusalka (Леста, днепровская русалка – Lesta, a Mermaid of the Dnepr, comic opera in three acts, November 6 [OS October 25], 1805, St Petersburg, Bolshoi Kamenny Theatre).
- Rusalka (Русалка – A Mermaid, libretto by Prince Alexander Shakhovskoy comic fairy opera in 3 acts, September 22 [OS September 10], St Petersburg, Bolshoi Kamenny Theatre) music by Davydov, Catterino Cavos and Wolfgang Amadeus Mozart.
- Lukashka, ili Svjatochnyj vecher (Лукашка или Святочный вечер – Lukashka or Christmas Eve), comic opera in one act (January 26 [OS January 14], 1816, Moscow).

== Ballets ==
- Uvenchaannaya blagost’ (Увенчанная благость - The Crowned Goodness, November 6 [October 25] 1801, St Petersburg, Hermitage)
- Torzhestvo blagodarnosti (Жертвоприношение благодарности - September 11 [OS August 30] 1802, St Petersburg, Bolshoi Kamenny Theatre)
- Graf Kastelli, ili Prestupnyi brat (Music by Davydov, Giuseppe Sarti and Vicente Martín y Soler, October 12 [OS September 30] 1804, St Petersburg)
- Przadnik žatvy (May 9 [April 27] 1823 Moscow)

== Bibliography ==
- [Ушаков В.], Русский театр. Днепровская русалка..., "Московский телеграф", 1829, .No 23;
- Рабинович А. С., Русская опера до Глинки, М., 1948;
- Грачев П. В., С. И. Давыдов, в кн.: Очерки по истории русской музыки. 1790–1825, Л., 1956.
