= Johann Theodor Mosewius =

German opera singer

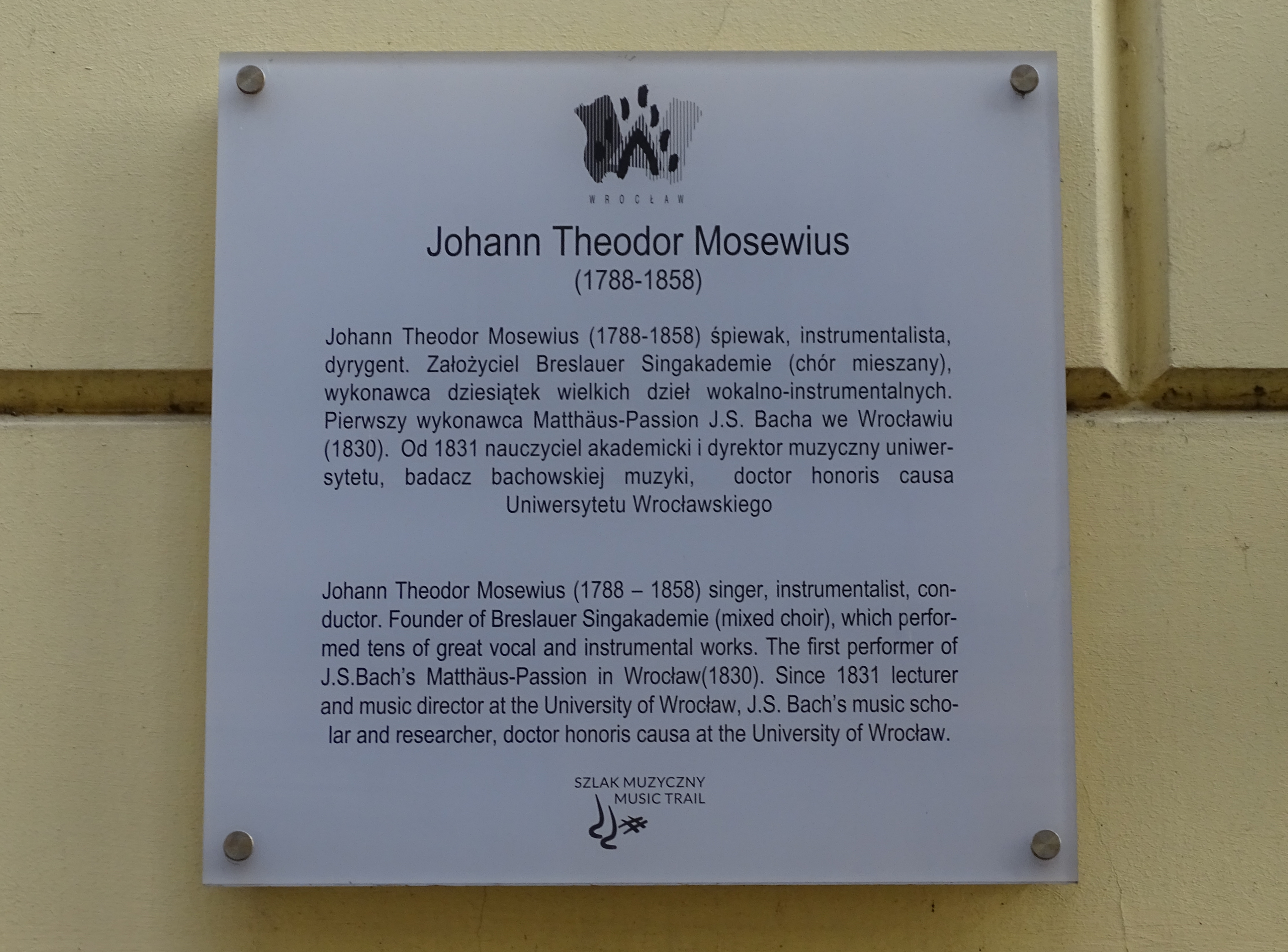
Plaque in tribute to Johann Theodor Mosewius in Wrocław

Johann Theodor Mosewius also Johann Theodor Mosevius (birth name "Moses") (25 September 1788 – 15. September 1858) was a German operatic bass, choirmaster and music director of the University of Wroclaw.

== Life ==
Mosewius was born in Königsberg. After studying law, he trained as an opera singer (bass) and worked as such at the local theatre, at the time of the management of August von Kotzebue (1814-1816), then he moved to Breslau, where he worked as a singer and actor until his quarrel with the theatre tenant Gottlob Benedict Bierey and the death of his wife.

Following the example of Carl Friedrich Zelter and his Sing-Akademie zu Berlin, Mosewius founded such an institute in 1825 in Breslau, too, with 26 members at first. Just six months later, the choir performed Handels' oratorium Samson under his direction.

One year after Mendelssohn's revival of Bach's St Matthew Passion in Berlin, Mosewius rehearsed it in Breslau in 1830 with overwhelming success. As a conductor and researcher, he took on the task of popularising Bach, and Breslau became one of the most important centres of Bach cultivation until 1945.

After the foundation of the academy of music, which partly existed at the same time as the Breslauer Liedertafel, he became a singing teacher or university music director (1827/1832), director of the academic institute for church music (1831), and founder of the musical circle for the performance of sacred music (1834). The Institute performed Italian oratorios as well as those by Mendelssohn, Carl Loewe, Louis Spohr, Adolf Bernhard Marx and others. In Breslau he joined the masonic lodge "Friedrich zum goldenen Zepter".

Shortly after his departure from the Wroclaw theatre on 16 December 1825, Mosewius performed for the first time parts of Schubert's Lieder cycle Die schöne Müllerin as part of an evening musical entertainment in the Wroclaw "great provincial resource".

Mosewius achieved international recognition through his activities and writings, and even during his time at the theatre, he always sought close contact with influential journalists (in Breslau, for example Karl Schall).

From 1810 Mosewius was married with the singer Sophie Wilhelmine, née Müller (1792-1825), who made her debut in Berlin 1805 and afterwards got a job in Königsberg. From 1810 to 1812, she stayed in Berlin and from 1816 she was engaged in Breslau.

His nickname as a foreign member of the Vienna literary society Ludlamshöhle was "Sebastiano da Solfeggio".

Mosewius died in Schaffhausen at the age of 69.

== Publications ==
- Michael Heinemann (ed.): Johann Theodor Mosewius: Johann Sebastian Bachs Matthäus-Passion, musikalisch aesthetisch dargestellt. (Beigebunden: Johann Sebastian Bach in seinen Kirchen-Cantaten und Choralgesängen.) Reprint of the 1845/52 edition, Hildesheim 2001.
- Johann Sebastian Bach in seinen Kirchen-Cantaten und Choralgesängen, dargestellt von Johann Theodor Mosewius.
