= Joachim Perinet =

Austrian actor and dramatist

Joachim Perinet (20 October 1763 – 4 April 1816) was an Austrian actor and dramatist. He is regarded as one of the founders of Alt-Wiener Volkstheater ("Old Viennese Folk Theatre").

== Life ==
Perinet was born in Vienna in 1763, the son of a merchant. His biographer in Allgemeine Deutsche Biographie (1887) wrote that he "received a very poor education and grew up, mostly left to his own devices, unrefined and ignorant. The rich gifts of keen observation and quick wits, bestowed on him by nature, were unfortunately developed in pubs and taverns and in the company of like-minded comrades."

His early writings were comic essays and satirical poems. In 1782, with Franz Xaver Karl Gewey, he took over the Theater am Neustift "Zum weißen Fasan" ("The White Pheasant"), where he gave unpaid performances. In 1785 he first appeared at the Theater in der Leopoldstadt, joining the company of Karl von Marinelli. In 1790 he was engaged at the theatre as a playwright, and in 1791 as an actor. In 1798 he moved to Emanuel Schikaneder's company at the Theater auf der Wieden; he returned in 1803 to the Leopoldstadt theatre, under Karl Friedrich Hensler, and, except for six months at Schikaneder's theatre in Brno in 1807, remained there until his death in 1816.

=== Family ===
Perinet married about 1787 Anna Gansch, an actress; after her death in 1798, he married in 1803 Viktoria Vamy, also an actress.

== His style of drama ==
Although he was popular as an actor in some comic roles, he was more important as a dramatist, and knew how to appeal to the public. Perinet is regarded as one of the founders of Alt-Wiener Volkstheater ("Old Viennese Folk Theatre"). He wrote over 100 pieces for the theatre. Productions, in contrast to those at the Viennese Court Theatre, catered for an unsophisticated audience. Dramatic forms included Zauberoper and Singspiel. Many Singspiele were based on farces by Philipp Hafner; songs in the Singspiele were often composed by Wenzel Müller.
