= Wenzel Müller =

Austrian composer and conductor

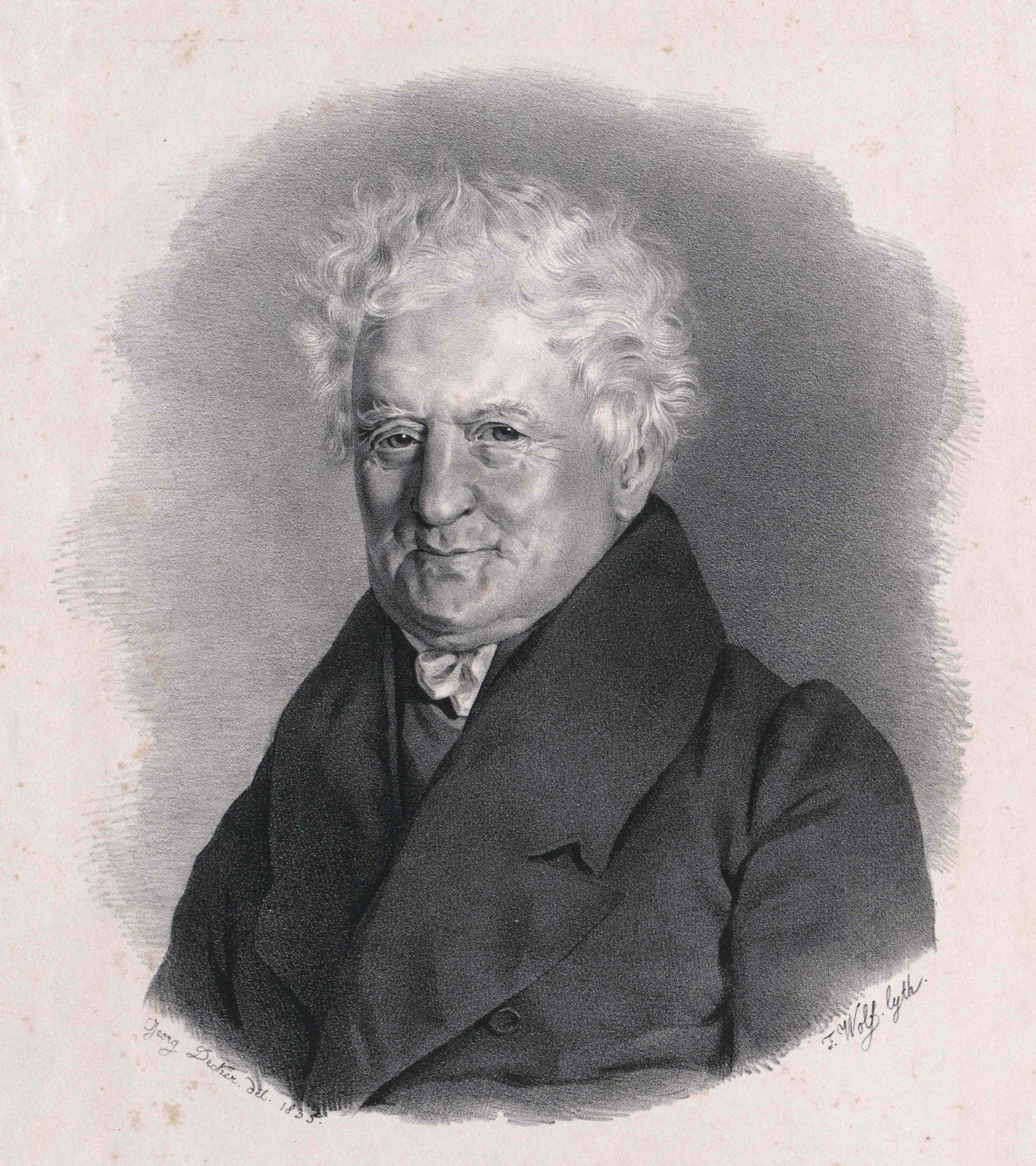
Wenzel Müller, lithograph by Georg Decker

Wenzel Müller (26 September 1767 – 3 August 1835) was an Austrian composer and conductor. He is regarded as the most prolific opera composer of all time with his 166 operas.

== Life and career ==
Müller was born in Markt Türnau, in Moravia. He studied with Carl Ditters von Dittersdorf and performed as a theatre musician in his youth. In 1786 he became Kapellmeister at the Theater in der Leopoldstadt in Leopoldstadt, Vienna. After several years at the German theatre in Prague from 1807 until 1813, he returned to Leopoldstadt, where he worked until 1830. Under his leadership, the theatre became one of the most important venues in Viennese musical life. He died in Baden bei Wien.

He was a popular and prolific composer, producing more than 250 works. Although he wrote several popular stage works (mostly Singspiele), his art songs are his enduring legacy. Often possessing witty music and lyrics or expressing a great deal of tenderness, Müller's songs were immensely popular, and some of the works he wrote with Ferdinand Raimund remain in the Viennese repertory. His opera Die Schwestern von Prag provided the theme for Beethoven's "Kakadu Variations" for piano trio, Opus 121a. He is said to have composed what has been falsely known as Mozart's Twelfth Mass, K. Anh. 232, the Missa in G major K. Anh. 232 (C1.04).

Müller was married three times; in 1787 he married singer Magdalena Reinigsthal (1770-1794). Their daughter Therese (1791–1876) had three children Caroline (1814–1868), Ottilia (1816–1817), Carl (born 1815) and Joseph (born 1816), all of whom became opera singers. Müller's second wife was the actress Anna Trautmann; they married in 1803, and she died in 1812. Having lived together since 1824, in 1830 he married the actress and singer Rosa Caroline Dillenthaler. On 3 August 1835, Müller died of natural causes in Baden bei Wien, Austria, at the age of 67.

== Stage works ==
Title	Genre	Subdivisions	Libretto	Première date	Place, theatre
Harlekin auf dem Parade Beth oder Nach dem Schlimmen folgt das Gute	große Pantomime		Anton Baumann	1784; 14 May 1790	Brno; Vienna, Theater in der Leopoldstadt
Das Sonnenfest der Braminen	heroisch-komisches Singspiel	2 acts	Karl Friedrich Hensler	9 September 1790	Vienna, Theater in der Leopoldstadt
Kaspar der Fagottist oder Die Zauberzither	Singspiel	3 acts	Joachim Perinet	8 June 1791	Vienna, Theater in der Leopoldstadt
Das neue Sonntagskind	Singspiel	2 acts	Joachim Perinet, after Philipp Hafner	10 October 1793	Vienna, Theater in der Leopoldstadt
Die Schwestern von Prag	Singspiel	2 acts	Joachim Perinet, after Philipp Hafner	11 March 1794	Vienna, Theater in der Leopoldstadt
Das lustige Beylager	Singspiel	2 acts	Joachim Perinet, after Philipp Hafner	14 February 1797	Vienna, Theater in der Leopoldstadt
Die Teufels Mühle am Wienerberg	Schauspiel mit Gesang	4 acts	Carl Friedrich Hensler/Leopold Huber	12 November 1799	Vienna, Theater in der Leopoldstadt
Die Belagerung von Ypsilon oder Evakathel und Schnudi	Karikaturoperette	2 acts	Joachim Perinet, after Philipp Hafner	4 May 1804	Vienna, Theater in der Leopoldstadt
Javima	Oper	3 acts		21 May 1807 Prague	Vienna, Theater in der Leopoldstadt
Samson	Melodram	3 acts	Joseph Anton Schuster	1808	Vienna, Theater in der Leopoldstadt
Simon Plattkopf, der Unsichtbare	Singspiel	1 act	Karl Ludwig Costenoble	1809	Vienna, Theater in der Leopoldstadt
Die Wunderlampe	Zauberoper	4 acts	Josef Alois Gleich	1810	Prague
Der Fiaker al Marquis	komische Oper	3 acts	Adolf Bäuerle	10 February 1816	Vienna, Theater in der Leopoldstadt
Aline oder Wien in einem andern Welttheil	Zauberoper	3 acts	Adolf Bäuerle	9 October 1822	Vienna, Theater in der Leopoldstadt
Der Barometermacher auf der Zauberinsel	Zauberposse	2 acts	Ferdinand Raimund	18 December 1823	Vienna, Theater in der Leopoldstadt
Der schwarze See oder Der Blasebalgmacher und der Geist	Zauberspiel	2 acts	Lenz?	4 February 1825	Vienna, Theater in der Leopoldstadt
Herr Josef und Frau Baberl	Posse	3 acts	Gleich	11 May 1826	Vienna, Theater in der Leopoldstadt
Die gefesselte Phantasie	Zauberspiel	2 acts	Ferdinand Raimund	8 January 1828	Vienna, Theater in der Leopoldstadt
Der Alpenkönig und der Menschenfeind	romantisch-komisches Zauberspiel	2 acts	Ferdinand Raimund	17 October 1828	Vienna, Theater in der Leopoldstadt

== Sources ==
- Peter Branscombe. "Müller, Wenzel." (subscription required) The New Grove Dictionary of Opera, edited by Stanley Sadie (1992), ISBN 0-333-73432-7 and ISBN 1-56159-228-5
