= Mozart's Twelfth Mass, K. Anh. 232 =

Mozart's Twelfth Mass is a commonly used title for a setting of the mass formerly attributed to Wolfgang Amadeus Mozart. Under this title, which was given to it by an English publisher, the piece attained great popularity in the 19th century and contributed to Mozart’s reputation. Today the piece is generally attributed to Wenzel Müller.

== Publication and performance history ==
The mass was published in 1819 as No. 12 in Novello's series of masses by Mozart, which is the origin of its name. Simrock was the first to publish the mass with full orchestral score, in 1821.

After its publication by Novello the Mass made a steep rise in popularity, which peaked around 1860, outdoing any major religious composition by, among others, Mozart, Haydn, Beethoven and Mendelssohn. In the English-speaking world, the Twelfth Mass broadly contributed to Mozart's fame well into the 20th century. For example, it is mentioned explicitly as a work by Mozart in James Joyce's novel, Ulysses, first published in 1922.

By the late 20th century professional performers generally steered away from it. However the Gloria portion of the mass continues to be popular with amateur choral groups.

=== Hymn tune ===
The hymn tune Nottingham is an arrangement derived from the Kyrie at the opening of the work. It is possible that the tune took its name because it was arranged by a musician living in Nottingham. In several hymn books the tune, sometimes known as Mozart, is still attributed to Mozart, whilst in others it is attributed to Wenzel Müller.

The hymn tune, which is usually in 7.7.7.7 metre, is most often sung to the words of Frances Ridley Havergal's "Take my life and let it be". It sometimes is set, in L.M., to "Fight the good fight".

== Attribution ==
Within a few years after publication, the music of the mass was described in the press as uncharacteristically showy for Mozart, and in other ways inconsistent with Mozart's usual style. The fugal part of the "Cum sancto spiritu" (in the Gloria), deemed in line with Mozart's greatness, can possibly be traced back to Mozart's days and surroundings.

The key signature of the mass is G major, although apart from the opening Kyrie the mass appears to be in C. This suggests that it may be put together from movements not originally intended for the same composition, maybe even from different composers.

Köchel rejected the attribution to Mozart in the Anhang (appendix) of the first edition of his catalogue of Mozart's works, there listed as K. Anh. 232, and in later editions as K. Anh. C1.04.

Within a century after its first publication several alternative composers had been named:

- August Eberhardt Müller (indicated as the composer of K. Anh. 248, 249 and 286)
- Wenzel Müller, rather known for his music theatre compositions
- Carl Zulehner, an early advocate of the authenticity of the composition, also composer of K. Anh. 243, who had damaged his reputation with various meddlings with Mozart compositions.

After additional research in the second half of the 20th century, the mass was generally assumed to have been composed by Wenzel Müller between Mozart's death in 1791, and 1803 when it was first mentioned in a library catalogue.

== Sources ==
- Mozart's Masses with an Accompaniment for the Organ, arranged from the full score by Vincent Novello. London: Gallaway, 1819-1824
- The Three Favorite Masses, Composed by Mozart, Haydn, and Beethoven, in Vocal Score, with an Accompaniment for the Organ or Pianoforte, by Vincent Novello. London: Novello, 1850.
- (in German) Ludwig Ritter von Köchel. Chronologisch-Thematisches Verzeichniss sämmtlicher Tonwerke Wolfgang Amade Mozarts. Breitkopf & Härtel: Leipzig, 1862.
- George Grove, A Dictionary of Music and Musicians, Vol. 3 (1907), pp 313-314
- Everist, Mark (2012). ""Mozart's" "Twelfth Mass": Case Closed?". Mozart's Ghosts: Haunting the Halls of Musical Culture. Oxford University Press. pp. 129–156. ISBN 978-0-19-538917-3.
- James Joyce, Ulysses, The Bodley Head, London, 1986
