= Thaddädl =

Thaddädl (a diminutive of the first name Thaddäus) is a kind of stock character or funny person of the Alt-Wiener Volkstheater towards the end of the 18th century, which was developed by Anton Hasenhut (1766-1841) following the Viennese Kasperle or the Pantalone of the Commedia dell'arte.
