= Dyjákovičky =

- Municipality
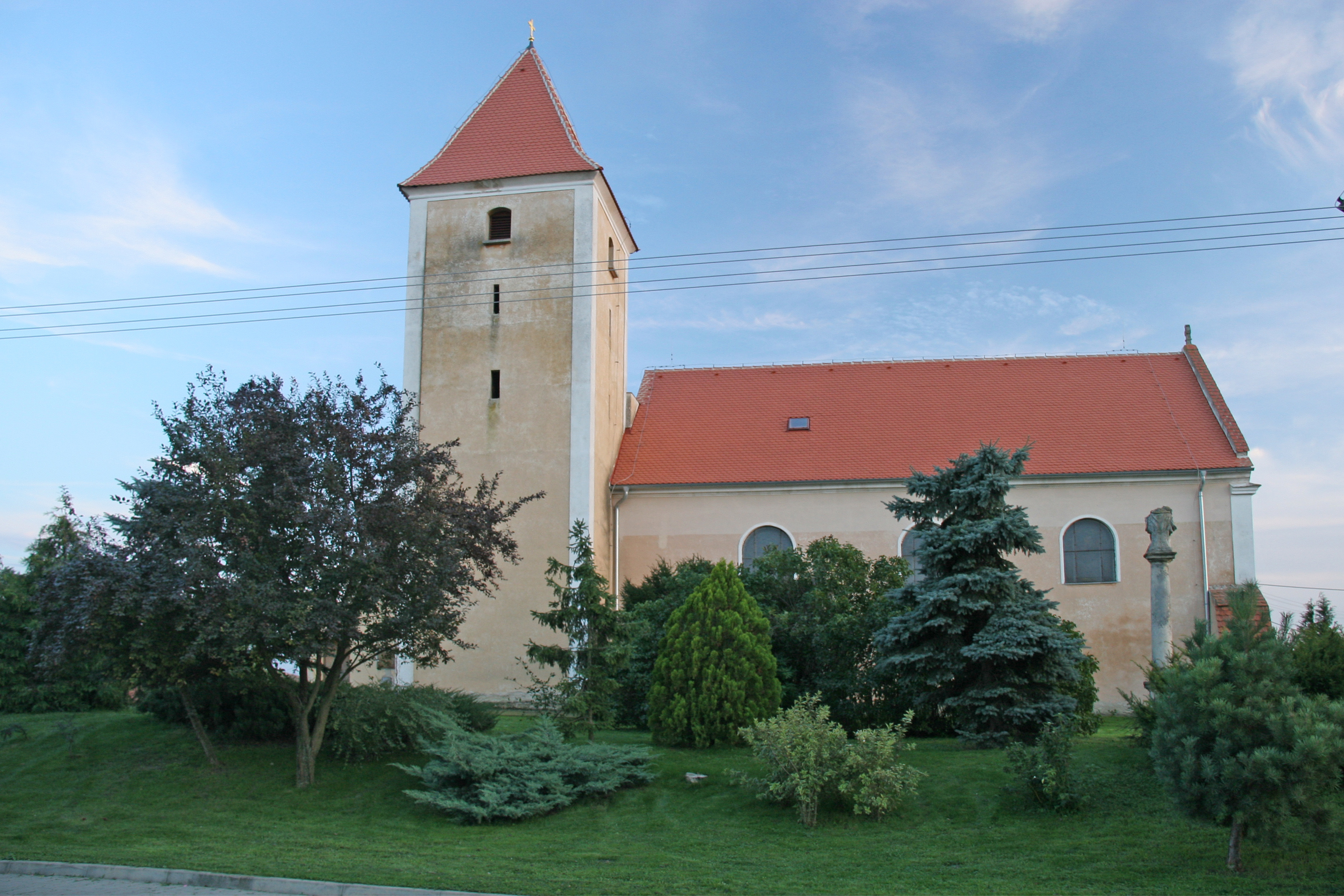
- Church of Saint Vitus

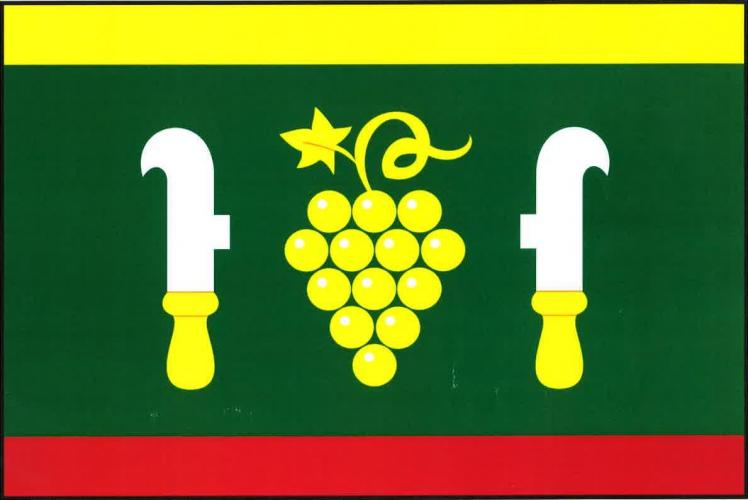
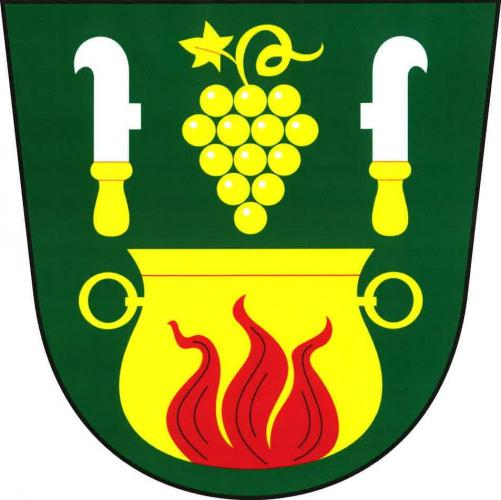
- Flag Coat of arms

- Location in the Czech Republic
- Coordinates: 48°46′56″N 16°5′44″E
- Country: Czech Republic
- Region: South Moravian
- District: Znojmo
- First mentioned: 1220

Area
  - Total: 13.00 km^{2} (5.02 sq mi)
- Elevation: 216 m (709 ft)

Population (2026-01-01)
  - Total: 587
  - Density: 45.2/km^{2} (117/sq mi)
- Time zone: UTC+1 (CET)
  - Summer (DST): UTC+2 (CEST)
- Postal code: 669 02
- Website: www.dyjakovicky.cz

Dyjákovičky (German: Klein Tajax) is a municipality and village in Znojmo District in the South Moravian Region of the Czech Republic. It has about 600 inhabitants.

Dyjákovičky lies approximately 11 kilometres (7 mi) south-east of Znojmo, 62 km (39 mi) south-west of Brno, and 190 km (120 mi) south-east of Prague.

== Demographics ==
Historical population
Year	Pop.	±%
1869	853	—
1880	848	−0.6%
1890	841	−0.8%
1900	875	+4.0%
1910	848	−3.1%
1921	960	+13.2%
1930	956	−0.4%
1950	647	−32.3%
1961	560	−13.4%
1970	452	−19.3%
1980	461	+2.0%
1991	416	−9.8%
2001	433	+4.1%
2011	490	+13.2%
2021	576	+17.6%
Source: Censuses

== Notable people ==
- Ferdinand Kauer (1751–1831), Austrian composer and pianist
