= Franz Xaver Karl Gewey =

Franz Xaver Karl Gewey (14 April 1764 – 18 October 1819) was an Austrian civil servant, and a writer and dramatist of popular satirical pieces.

== Life ==
Gewey was born in Vienna, son of a lawyer. He studied law, and from 1784 was employed at the Hofkriegsrat, then in Klagenfurt at the presidential chancellery; from 1795 he was a court chancellor in Vienna.

From an early age he was interested in the theatre, playing on amateur stages with Joachim Perinet. He had a talent for parody and comic depictions of everyday life in Vienna.

Gewey's early plays Die Modesitten ("The fashionable ways") and Pygmalion were well received, and went on to write further satirical pieces, that were in tune with the popular mood at that time. He was also successful with his serious play Der seltene Prozeß ("The remarkable trial"). Most of his plays were not printed and are now lost.

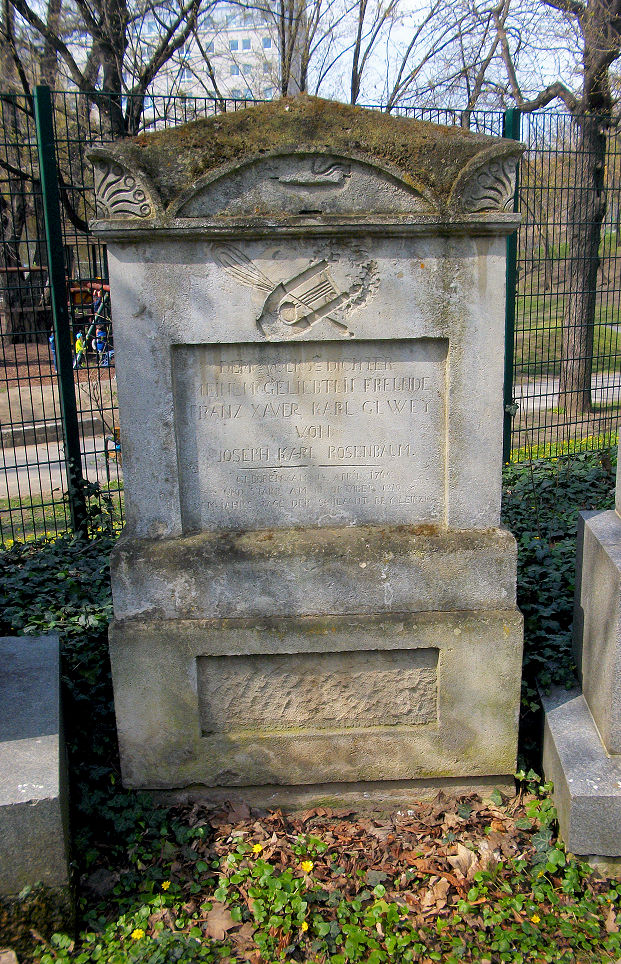
Gewey's grave, erected by Joseph Carl Rosenbaum, in Waldmüllerpark, Vienna

After the death of Joseph Richter in 1813 he took over the writing of the popular Eipeldauer-Briefe ("Letters from Eipeldauer, recently arrived in Vienna, to his cousin in Kakran"), continuing until his death in 1819. They are of interest, being written in dialect and showing local customs of the day. Also popular were his Komische Gedichte über die Stadt und die Vorstädte Wiens ("Comic poems about the city and the suburbs of Vienna"), in four issues during 1812, with two further issues by Gewey and Karl Meisl.

== His character ==
He was described by the writer Franz Gräffer: "It was a great pleasure to be in Gewey's company; constant cheerfulness, a bubbly mood, there was laughter and laughter. Even his open, clear, jovial expression was heart-warming.... He spoke very loudly, laughed even louder, really resoundingly, and fell into looking glaring, grotesque; he was also quite fond of the genre of cynicism. Parody spiced with a little sarcasm was his sphere".
