= Ferdinand Kauer =

Austrian composer and pianist

Ferdinand August Kauer (18 January 1751 – 13 April 1831) was an Austrian composer and pianist.

== Biography ==
Kauer was born in Klein-Thaya (today Dyjákovičky) near Znojmo in South Moravia). He studied in Znojmo, Tyrnau, and Vienna, and later settled in Vienna around 1777. In 1781 he joined Karl von Marinelli's newly formed company at Vienna as leader and conductor of the orchestra. From 1782 he also composed music for the theatre, including Singspiele, operas, and incidental music and songs, mostly to texts by the house poet Karl Friedrich Hensler. Their first major success was Das Faustrecht in Thüringen (The Law of the Jungle in Thüringen, 1796–1797), which was eclipsed two years later by the success of Das Donauweibchen (1798).

He was Kapellmeister of the Theater in der Leopoldstadt and Theater in der Josefstadt in Vienna and also in Graz. He directed the Leopoldstadt Theater Music School and by the 1790s had become known for his popular Singspiele. In addition to his successful stage works he composed several tutorial methods for violin, flute, piano and singing (c. 1790). A tragic flood in 1830 destroyed all Kauer's possessions, including most of his scores. He continued to work as the second viola player at the Theater in der Leopoldstadt orchestra until his death in Vienna a year later.

== Legacy ==
He wrote about 200 operas and Singspiele. The romantic opera Das Donauweibchen (1798) was one of the most popular operas of the early 19th century. It was staged in Russia in 1803–1807 as Lesta, dneprovskaya rusalka (Russian: Леста, днепровская русалка) and its three sequels with Russian text and additional music by the naturalised Russian immigrant Catterino Cavos who originally hailed from Venice, and Stepan Davydov (1777–1825).

Das Donauweibchen was the first opera staged in Finland on 3 December 1826 in Viipuri by Schultz’s company. It was not unusual for travelling companies to make an excursion from the nearby Saint Petersburg to Viipuri, Finland being an autonomous Grand Duchy in the Russian Empire at the time.

Kauer also wrote 200 masses, many pieces of chamber music, incidental music (including Das Faustrecht in Thüringen). His "12 Neue Ungarische Tänze" reflect the influence of roaming Gypsy orchestras upon many composers of this era. In his "Sei variazioni" (c. 1810) Kauer introduced the xylophone into western classical music, and from that time this instrument has been adopted as a regular element of the orchestra. His music is rarely performed in modern times, but has been shown to be highly imaginative, tuneful, and worthy of further study.

== Selected works ==
Title	Genre	Subdivisions	Libretto	Première date	Theatre (in Vienna)
Der Streit zwischen dem Zauberer Scionco und der Fee Galantina, oder Kasperl bleibt Kasperl	comedy with machines and music	3 acts		February 3, 1784	Theater in der Leopoldstadt
Der unschuldige Betrug	Kinder-Operette	1 act	L Huber	June 22, 1790	Theater in der Leopoldstadt
Bastien und Bastienne	Operette		after French work	August 18, 1790	Theater in der Leopoldstadt
Die Serenade, oder Der gefoppte Alte	Singspiel	2 acts		June 4, 1792	Theater in der Leopoldstadt
Das Faustrecht in Thüringen part 1	Schauspiel	4 acts	Karl Friedrich Hensler	April 7, 1796	Theater in der Leopoldstadt
Das Faustrecht in Thüringen part 2	Schauspiel	4 acts	Karl Friedrich Hensler	June 28, 1796	Theater in der Leopoldstadt
Das Faustrecht in Thüringen part 3	Schauspiel	4 acts	Karl Friedrich Hensler	January 17, 1797	Theater in der Leopoldstadt
Das Donauweibchen part 1	romantisch-komisches Volksmärchen	3 acts	Karl Friedrich Hensler	January 11, 1798	Theater in der Leopoldstadt
Das Donauweibchen part 2	romantisch-komisches Volksmärchen	3 acts	Karl Friedrich Hensler	February 13, 1798	Theater in der Leopoldstadt
Die Löwenritter	Schauspiel	4 acts	Karl Friedrich Hensler	September 5, 1799	Theater in der Leopoldstadt
Das Sternenmädchen im Meidlinger Walde	romantisch-komisches Volksmärchen	3 acts	L Huber	October 20, 1801	Theater in der Leopoldstadt
Telemach Prinz von Ithaca	travestirtes Singspiel	3 acts	Karl Friedrich Hensler	April 29, 1801	Theater in der Leopoldstadt
Philibert und Kasperl, oder Weiber sind getreuer als Männer	Zauberoper	3 acts	Karl Friedrich Hensler	February 7, 1804	Theater in der Leopoldstadt
Faschingswehen	Lustspiel	3 acts	J F Kringsteiner	March 4, 1805	Theater in der Leopoldstadt
Die Kreutzerkomödie	Posse	3 acts	J F Kringsteiner	June 21, 1805	Theater in der Leopoldstadt
Der travestierte Telemach	Karikatur	3 acts	Joachim Perinet	August 29, 1805	Theater in der Leopoldstadt
Heinrich der Stolze, Herzog von Sachsen	Schauspiel	3 acts	J A Gleich	October 5, 1806	Theater in der Leopoldstadt
Orpheus und Euridice, oder So geht es im Olympus zu	mythologische Karikatur	2 acts	K Meisl	February 20, 1813	Theater in der Leopoldstadt
Antonius und Cleopatra	Posse	1 act	M F Perth, after August von Kotzebue	February 25, 1814	Theater in der Josefstadt
Die Musikanten am Hohen Markt	Posse	3 acts	J A Gleich	March 28, 1815	Theater in der Josefstadt

Ferdinand Kauer’s keyboard "Sonata militaire" was mistakenly attributed to Joseph Haydn as Sonata D major, Hob. XVI: D1.

== Bibliography ==
- Kauer, Ferdinand. Kurzgefasste Generalbass-Schule für Anfänger. Wien, J. Cappi. c. 1800
- Kauer, Ferdinand. Kurzgefasste Harmonieschule für Damen mit Tonsystem, worin das H ausgeschlossen wird. c. 1800
- Manschinger K.: Ferdinand Kauer, doctoral thesis, Vienna 1929
- Bauer, A.: Das Theater in der Josefstadt, 1957
- Longyear, R. M.: Ferdinand Kauer's Percussion Enterprises, Galpin Society Journal, vol. 27 (1974), 2–8.
