= Kakadu Variations =

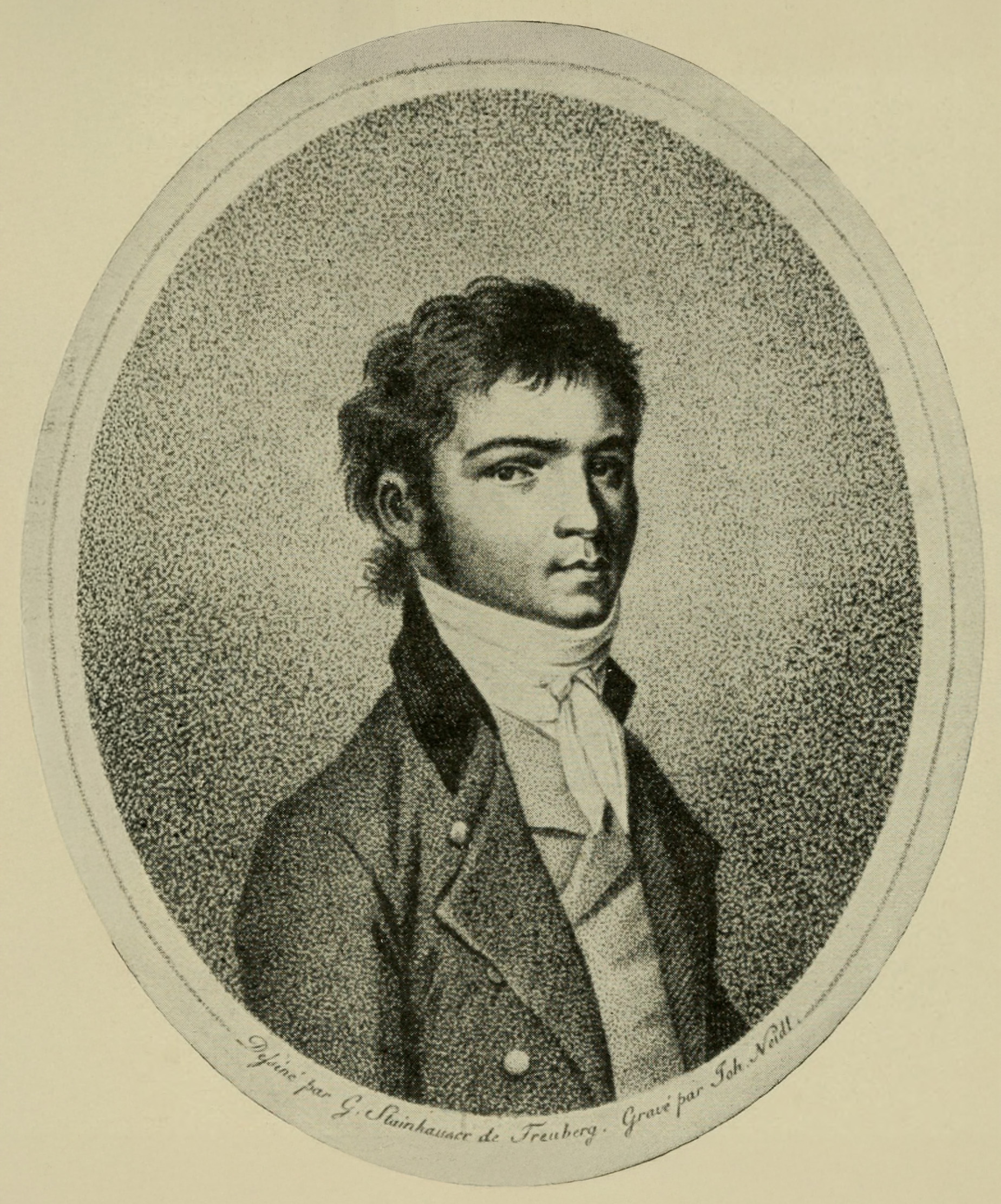
Ludwig van Beethoven, c. 1796

"Kakadu (Note: "Kakadu" is the German word for cockatoo.) Variations" is the nickname given to Ludwig van Beethoven's set of variations for piano trio on the theme "Ich bin der Schneider Kakadu" by Wenzel Müller. The Variations was published in 1824 as Opus 121a, the last of Beethoven's piano trios to be published. The work is notable for the contrast between its solemn introduction and the lightweight variations that follow.

== Composition history ==
Despite the late publication date, (Note: Three years before the composer's death.) the Kakadu Variations is often described as an early work, thought to have been composed around 1803, and left unpublished for the next two decades. Although the first full autograph dates from 1816, the earlier composition date is supported by correspondence in 1803 from Beethoven's brother Karl, which appears to describe the Variations, and by the fact that the composer himself later described it as "among my early works".

Commentator Lewis Lockwood, a leading authority on Beethoven, has argued, however, that the Kakadu Variations has a more complex history. Lockwood proposes that the 1816 autograph reflects a substantial reworking of an earlier draft, including a major revision of the introduction. Given that it was not published until 1824, it is even possible that Beethoven made further revisions at the time of publication, a period when he was producing some of his greatest works, including the Diabelli Variations, the Missa Solemnis and the Ninth Symphony. Direct evidence for this comes, among other elements, in the form of the extremely energetic and tight counterpoint of the double fugue in G minor that makes up the transition from variation X to the allegretto finale. This double fugue is highly reminiscent, both of that in the finale of the 9th Symphony linking the tenor solo to the recapitulation of the "Freude..", and of the Handelian fugue near the end of the Diabelli Variations. The presence of such tight and dramatic fugal writing is one of the hallmarks of Beethoven's late style.

Lockwood considers the Kakadu Variations to be an uneven work, with "many moments of grace and beauty, but no true unity of style or style-feeling". While the central part of the work is typical of Beethoven's early style, the introduction and, to a lesser extent, the final variation display a maturity and depth that is characteristic of Beethoven's late period. The complex harmonic progressions and contrapuntal passages in these sections are closer to Beethoven's style of 1816 (Note: For example, the Piano Sonata Op. 101 and the Cello Sonatas Op. 102.) than to his more youthful works. Lockwood suggests that the revision and publication late in life of a project begun in youth should be understood as an act of nostalgia on Beethoven's part, in which "the old composer, profoundly engaged in musical projects of the greatest difficulty and depth, looks back with nostalgia on a simple work from his youth, and seeks to bring it out in the world, having clothed it with just enough complexity to balance its naivete and directness with the wisdom of his later years".

== Structure ==
The work begins with a solemn adagio introduction in G minor that lasts for around a third of the work's total duration. The theme itself, when it finally appears, is almost comically anticlimactic—a simple, even trivial tune taken from Wenzel Müller's opera Die Schwestern von Prag, composed in Vienna in 1794 and popular during Beethoven's lifetime. This theme is followed by 10 variations, the first eight of which are conventional in style—a sequence of increasingly ornate decorations on Müller's theme as it passes back and forth between the three instruments. With the ninth variation, the music returns to the minor key and slow tempo of the introduction, while the final variation is a longer movement with several episodes of contrasting mood and tempo. Like the introduction, this final variation shows a chromatic and contrapuntal complexity that goes beyond what Beethoven achieved in his early works, and that likely reflects revisions made during his period of greatest maturity.

Typical performances of the work last between about 17 and 19 minutes.

== See also ==
- List of variations on a theme by another composer
