= Matthäus Stegmayer =

Austrian composer

Matthäus Stegmayer (also Matthias; 29 April 1771 – 10 May 1820 (Note: The year of death is also given as 1810.)) was an Austrian composer, musician, music publisher, librettist and actor.

== Life and career ==
Born in Vienna, Stegmayer was the son of a master tailor and citizen of Vienna and. His sons were Karl Stegmayer (1800–1862; conductor, and the author of several montanistic half-timbering and stage plays), Ferdinand Stegmayer (1801–1863; choirmaster) and Wilhelm Stegmayer (born 1805; a child actor and later a military officer).

Stegmayer was a member of the Wiener Sängerknaben in the Dominican Church, Vienna and attended the Akademische Gymnasium from 1783 to 1789, but following his inclination he joined the acting society of Johann Christian Kunz and in 1790 the troupe of Christof Ludwig Seipp in Bratislava, with whom he travelled the Austrian provinces. From 1792, he started to compose incidental music for the stage with Seipp, his first work being the music for August von Kotzebue's Singspiel Der Eremit von Formentara. In the same year, he was engaged at the Theater in der Josefstadt as a young lover. From 1796, he worked at Emanuel Schikaneder's Theater auf der Wieden as a composer, comic actor and playwright. From 1801, he also worked for the Burgtheater, the Theater an der Wien and the Kärntnertortheater.

From 1804, he was in contact with the Nationaltheater Mannheim, which performed some of his works. In 1807, he got in contact with the Weimarer Hoftheater and Johann Wolfgang von Goethe and from 1816 until 1820, he was director of the Viennese court theatre music publishing house. Stegmayer's most famous work is the Quodlibet Rochus Pumpernickel (music by Ignaz Xaver von Seyfried, premiered in 1809 at the Theater an der Wien). His play Till Eulenspiegel (premiered in 1808 there) was the model for Johann Nestroy's posse Eulenspiegel oder Schabernack über Schabernack (1835).

Stegmayer wrote and composed about a hundred comedies, posses, singspiele, operettas, two masses, some motets, secular and sacred music. His librettos have been set to music by Conradin Kreutzer, Johann Georg Lickl, Ignaz von Seyfried, Franz Xaver Süßmayr and Gottlob Benedict Bierey.

Under the name Meyer auf der Stiege, Stegmayer is said to have been a member of the literary society Ludlamshöhle founded by Ignaz Franz Castelli.
