= Ludlamshöhle =

German literary society

The Ludlamshöhle was a literary society founded by the Austrian playwright Ignaz Franz Castelli together with August von Gymnich in Vienna, Austria, in 1819, which existed until 18 April 1826.

The society was named after the theatre play Ludlam's Höhle by Adam Oehlenschläger. After the first performance on December 15, 1817, a group of "literati" (already existing since 1816) met in the "Haidvogels Gasthaus" (Schlossergäßchen, Vienna) to discuss the performance. As this play had failed with the audience that evening, Castelli suggested giving the group the name "Ludlamshöhle" as a consolation for the Danish writer. The adjoining room in "Haidvogel's Gasthaus", where the daily meeting at the regulars' table took place, was declared a clubhouse.

The Ludlamshöhle did not pursue any political or artistic goals; the regulars' table every evening served without exception for social gatherings. From today's point of view, the Ludlamshöhle is a prime example of the Biedermeier sociability.

During the night of 18–19 April 1826, this society was suspected (unjustified by anything) of "endangering the state" and was banned. By order of the Viennese police chief Alois von Persa, more than 30 policemen occupied the inn, arrested those present and confiscated all manuscripts found. The private flats of the arrested "Ludlamites" were also searched until the early hours of the morning. Some of their members continued to suffer years of spying and other harassment. It was precisely this excessive action by the authorities that led to the mythification of the group and its members in the following years.

A new member had to prove to the amusement of all that he was capable of increasing the pleasure of the society by joining. He was then examined in the subjects Ludlam History, Ludlam Finance and Frivolity Science, with several whispering seconds being given to the subject. After passing the exam, the new member was given a "Ludlam name" and the "recording song" was sung together. Various songs for the society have been preserved by Antonio Salieri, including the texts Es lebe Ludlam and O Gott, o Gott! d´Ludlam ist todt.

After 1848, an attempt was made to revive the Ludlamshöhle, but it was a failure.

In 1949, the writers Franz Karl Franchy, Egon Hajek, Theodor Mayer, Friedrich Schreyvogel and Karl Wache joined in Vienna to form a society called "Neue Ludlamshöhle" which lasted until 1972.
