= Theodor Mayer (writer) =

Austrian writer (1884–1949)

- Born: 27 February 1884; Vienna, Austria
- Died: 3 November 1949 (aged 65); Vienna, Austria
- Occupations: Writer; chemist

Theodor Heinrich Mayer (27 February 1884 – 3 November 1949) was an Austrian writer and chemist. His work was part of the art competitions at the 1928 Summer Olympics and the 1936 Summer Olympics.

== Works ==
Novels, unless indicated otherwise

- Von Menschen und Maschinen (1915)
- Typhus (1920)
- Wir (drama, 1921)
- Prokop der Schneider (1922)
- Rapanui – Der Untergang einer Welt (1923)
- Cyprian der Abenteurer (1924)
- Die Macht der Dinge (short stories, 1924)
- David findet Abissag (1925)
- Der große Stiefel (1926)
- Die letzten Bürger (1927)
- Die Bahn über den Berg (1928)
- Minister Bruck: Das Buch vom Anschluß Österreichs, wie er vor siebzig Jahren hätte sein können und auch heute noch sein kann (1929)
- Tod über der Welt (1930)
- Königgrätz (1931)
- Clown der Welt: Ein Film-Roman (1931)
- Deutscher im Osten (1932)
- Geld ... Geld! (1935)
- Ärzte (1936)
- Der Adjutant des Prinzen (1937)
- Sudeten (1938)
- Vom Gedanken zur Tat. Novellen aus der Geschichte werktätigen Schaffens (novellas) (1941)
- Menschenland (1947)
- Im ewigen Eis (1949)
