= Karl von Marinelli =

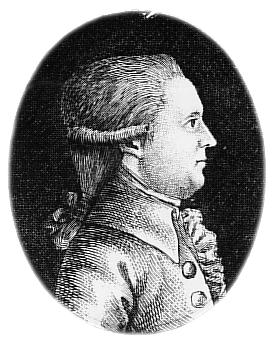
Karl von Marinelli

Karl Edler von Marinelli (baptized 12 September 1745, Vienna – 28 January 1803, Vienna) was an actor, theatre manager and playwright.

From 1761, Marinelli was a travelling comedian in the "Schultz Company" ("Schultzsche Gesellschaft") in Baden (Lower Austria), which was taken over a few years later by J. M. Menninger and played in Brno, Bratislava, Budapest and Vienna.

He was one of the founders of the genre of "Vienna Local Comedy"; ("Wiener Lokalposse"), and the author of several plays for the Schultz company. In 1780, he became head of the company, where J. J. La Roche performed most successfully as the "Punch" ("Kasperl"). He opened the first permanent popular theatre of Vienna with this troupe in the Theater in der Leopoldstadt (also known as "Kasperl Theater") in 1781.

In the same year, the composer Ferdinand Kauer joined his company as leader of the orchestra and as conductor. Kauer composed plenty of music for Marinelli's theatre, including more than a hundred singspiels and operas, also incidental music and songs, mostly to texts by the house poet Karl Friedrich Hensler. Their first major success was Das Faustrecht in Thüringen (The Law of the Jungle in Thüringen, 1796–1797), which was eclipsed by the success of by Das Donauweibchen (1798), which premiered two years later.

== Works ==
- Der Ungar in Wien, 1773
- Der Bürger und der Soldat, 1773
- Der Schauspieler, 1774
- Der Geschmack in der Komödie ist unbestimmt, 1774
- Der Anfang muß empfehlen, 1774
- Das Findelkind, 1775
- Die Überschwemmung, 1775
- Liebesgeschichte in Hirschau, 1780
- Aller Anfang ist schwer, 1781
- Don Juan oder Der steinerne Gast, 1783
- Die Reise ist nahe, oder Die dankbaren Schauspieler o. J.
