= Karl Friedrich Hensler =

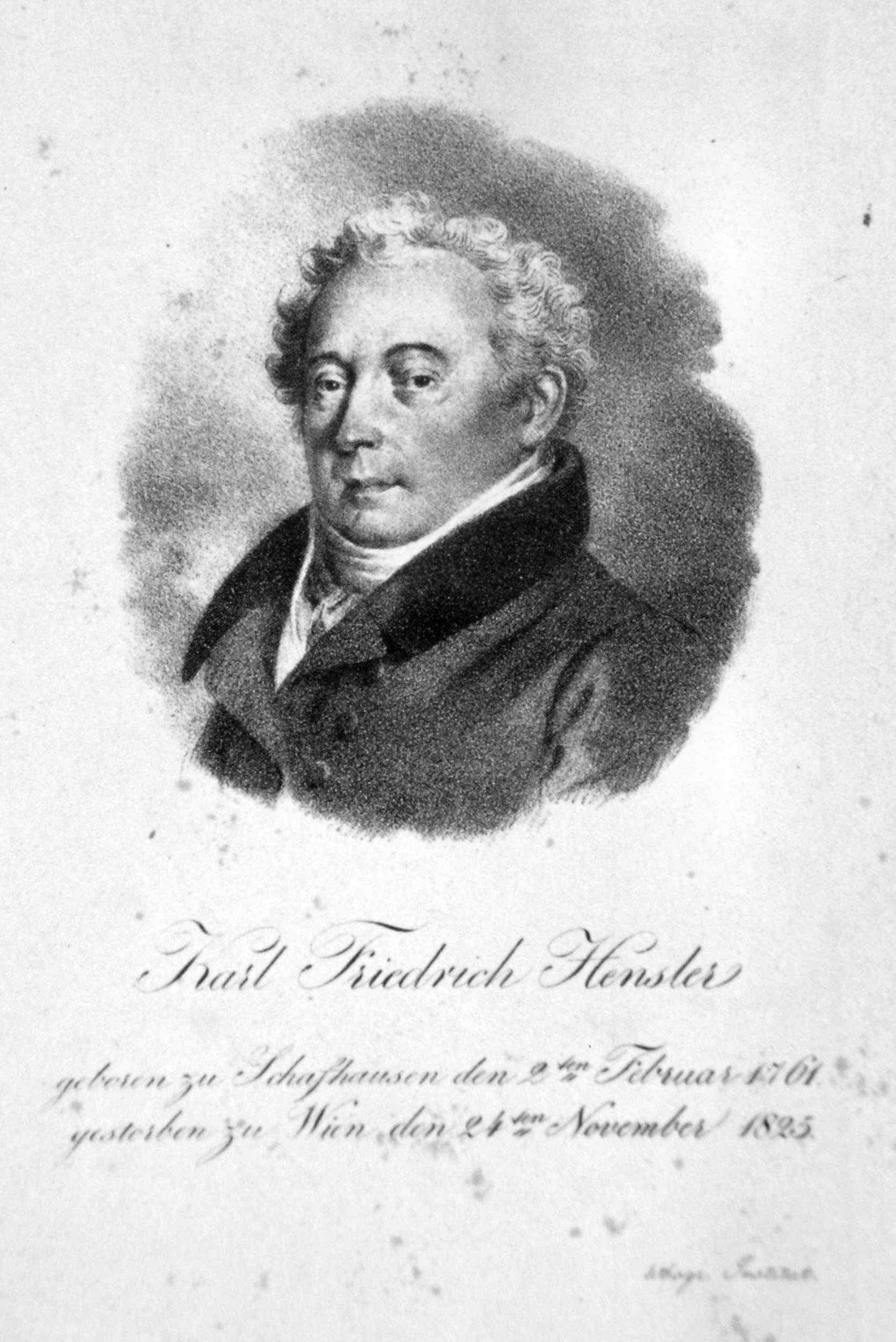
Karl Friedrich Hensler, c.1820. Lithograph by Joseph Lanzedelly the Elder.

Karl Friedrich Hensler (1 February 1759 – 24 November 1825) was a dramatist and theatre manager in Vienna.

== Life ==
Hensler was born in Vaihingen an der Enz in 1759, son of a ducal physician of Württemberg, and studied at the University of Göttingen. From 1784 he lived in Vienna, where an uncle sought to obtain a diplomatic career for him.

Karl von Marinelli, manager of the Theater in der Leopoldstadt in Vienna, staged his play Der Soldat von Cherson, which opened on 1 May 1785. After its success, Hensler wrote many more plays for this theatre; his plays include Das Donauweibchen, Die Nymphe der Donau and Die Teufelsmühle am Wienerberg.

When Marinelli died in 1803, Hensler leased the Leopoldstadt Theatre and managed it until 1813. He took over the Theater an der Wien in Vienna in 1817, and the following year theatres in Pressburg (present-day Bratislava) and Baden. In Vienna he rebuilt the Theater in der Josefstadt; it opened in 1822 with Beethoven's overture written for the occasion, The Consecration of the House.

Hensler died in Vienna in 1825. His daughter Josepha von Scheidlin took over the management of the Josefstadt Theatre.
