= Deaths in April 1992 =

The following is a list of notable deaths in April 1992.

Entries for each day are listed alphabetically by surname. A typical entry lists information in the following sequence:

- Name, age, country of citizenship at birth, subsequent country of citizenship (if applicable), reason for notability, cause of death (if known), and reference.

== April 1992 ==
=== 1 ===
- Robert Edward Bell, 73, Canadian nuclear physicist and academic.
- Carl E. Duckett, 69, American intelligence operative, lung cancer.
- Frank Glennon, 73, Irish Olympic footballer (1948).
- Michael Havers, Baron Havers, 69, British barrister and politician.
- Seymour Mamedov, 20, Azerbaijani soldier, killed in battle.
- Audrey Peppe, 74, American figure skater and Olympian (1936).
- Nigel Preston, 28, English drummer, drug overdose.
- Walter Andreas Schwarz, 78, German singer.
- Konstantin Sergeyev, 82, Russian danseur, artistic director and choreographer.
- Edward Smouha, 82, British track and field athlete and Olympic medalist (1928).

=== 2 ===
- Nugzar Asatiani, 54, Soviet Olympic fencer (1960, 1964).
- Juanito, 37, Spanish footballer and Olympian (1976), traffic collision.
- Hjalmar Karlsson, 86, Swedish Olympic sailor (1956).
- Paula Kelly, 72, American singer.
- Gabriel Tiacoh, 28, Ivorian sprinter and Olympic medalist (1984, 1988), meningitis.
- Tomisaburō Wakayama, 62, Japanese actor (Lone Wolf and Cub), heart failure.
- Dib Williams, 82, American baseball player (Philadelphia Athletics, Boston Red Sox).

=== 3 ===
- Aaron Bohrod, 84, American painter, liver cancer.
- Nie Fengzhi, 79, Chinese Army Lieutenant general.
- Juan García Hortelano, 64, Spanish writer, poet and literary critic, lung cancer.
- Ivan Rukavina, 80, Yugoslav Army general and politician.
- Karl Tunberg, 85, American screenwriter (Ben-Hur).

=== 4 ===
- Wayne Athorne, 50, Australian rules footballer and decathlete.
- Vincenzo Bertolotto, 79, Italian rugby player.
- Albrecht Fleckenstein, 74, German pharmacologist and physiologist.
- Henry Groves, 95, English cricketer and British Army officer.
- Vintilă Horia, 76, Romanian writer.
- Salgueiro Maia, 47, Portuguese Army officer, cancer.
- Rixi Markus, 81, Austrian-British contract bridge player.
- Samuel Reshevsky, 80, Polish-American chess player.
- Arthur Russell, 40, American musician, AIDS.

=== 5 ===
- Daniel Campbell, 66, Canadian politician.
- Takeshi Inoue, 63, Japanese footballer.
- Molly Picon, 94, American actress (Fiddler on the Roof, The Cannonball Run, Car 54, Where Are You?), Alzheimer's disease.
- Modjeska Monteith Simkins, 92, American social rights and civil rights activist.
- Sam Walton, 74, American businessman, founder of Walmart, multiple myeloma.

=== 6 ===
- Isaac Asimov, 72, Russian-American science fiction author (Foundation, Galactic Empire, Robot), heart failure.
- Patrick Desmond Callaghan, 65, Pakistani air officer.
- Edith Katherine Cash, 101, American mycologist and lichenologist.
- Vakhtang Chabukiani, 82, Soviet ballet dancer.
- Donald Harding, 43, American murderer, execution by gas chamber.
- Peter Hayman, 77, British diplomat and intelligence operative.
- Geoffrey Holden, 75, British painter.
- Herman Francis Mark, 96, Austrian-American chemist.
- Edward S. Montgomery, 81, American journalist, pneumonia.
- Jim Pomeroy, 47, American artist.
- Erling Wikborg, 97, Norwegian politician.

=== 7 ===
- Ace Bailey, 88, Canadian ice hockey player (Toronto Maple Leafs).
- Horst Niemack, 83, German general during World War II.
- Clovis Ruffin, 46, American fashion designer, complication from AIDS.
- Alix Talton, 71, American actress, lung cancer.
- Antonis Tritsis, 55, Greek politician and urban planner.
- Frank Walsh, 89, American golfer.

=== 8 ===
- Bob Allen, 83, Australian rules footballer.
- Daniel Bovet, 85, Swiss-born Italian pharmacologist, Nobel Prize recipient (1957), cancer.
- John Cherberg, 81, American football coach and politician.
- Roberto Curcio, 79, Italian Olympic modern pentathlete (1948).
- Ronald Eyre, 62, English theatre director.
- Lewis Germaine, 57, Australian cricketer.
- Käte Hamburger, 95, German Germanist, literary scholar and philosopher.
- Frédéric du Hen, 88, Dutch Olympic middle distance runner (1928).
- Nelson Olmsted, 78, American actor.
- Gilbert de Beauregard Robinson, 85, Canadian mathematician.
- Sam Rosen, 70, American comic book artist and letterer (Spider-Man, Captain America, X-Men).

=== 9 ===
- Charles Ginsburg, 71, American engineer and inventor of the videotape recorder, pneumonia.
- John Kissell, 68, American gridiron football player (Cleveland Browns).
- Ivan Lund, 62, Australian Olympic fencer (1952, 1956, 1960, 1964).
- Gale W. McGee, 77, American politician, member of the U.S. Senate (1959–1977).
- Theodor Schieffer, 81, German historian.
- Alfred Szklarski, 80, Polish author.
- Erik Werba, 73, Austrian classical pianist.

=== 10 ===
- Charles Mitchill Bogert, 83, American herpetologist and museum curator.
- Hermann Eppenhoff, 72, German football player and manager.
- Şahlar Hüseynov, 23, Azerbaijani soldier and war hero, killed in action .
- János Kajdi, 52, Hungarian boxer and Olympian (1964, 1968, 1972), traffic collision.
- Sam Kinison, 38, American comedian and actor (Back to School), traffic collision.
- Cec Linder, 71, Polish-Canadian actor (Goldfinger, Quatermass and the Pit, Lolita), pulmonary emphysema.
- Peter D. Mitchell, 71, English biochemist, Nobel Prize recipient (1978).
- William Paling, 99, British politician.

=== 11 ===
- James Brown, 72, American actor (The Adventures of Rin Tin Tin), lung cancer.
- Adele Dixon, 83, English actress and singer, pneumonia.
- Heinrich Lausberg, 79, German linguist.
- Frank Maher, 73, American gridiron football player (Pittsburgh Steelers, Cleveland Rams).
- Eve Merriam, 75, American poet, liver cancer.
- Fakhraddin Musayev, 34, Azerbaijani soldier, killed in battle.
- Alejandro Obregón, 71, Colombian artist.
- Gerard Tichy, 72, German-Spanish actor.
- Josip Vidmar, 96, Slovenian literary critic, essayist, and politician.
- Doc Williams, 93, American football player.

=== 12 ===
- Ilario Bandini, 80, Italian racing driver and racing car manufacturer.
- Makineni Basavapunnaiah, 77, Indian politician.
- Betty Bays, 61, American baseball player.
- Rie Beisenherz, 90, Dutch Olympic swimmer (1920).
- Ettore Gracis, 76, Italian conductor.
- Georg Haentzschel, 84, German pianist, broadcaster, composer and arranger.
- Gunter Jahn, 81, German U-boat commander during World War II.
- Deane Keller, 90, American artist and academic.
- Jean Émile Reymond, 79, Monegasque politician.
- Robert L. Wheeler, 71, American trainer of thoroughbred racehorses.

=== 13 ===
- John Bruno, 27, American gridiron football player (Pittsburgh Steelers), skin cancer.
- Pierre Deniger, 44, Canadian politician, member of the House of Commons of Canada (1979-1984).
- Lance Dobson, 71, Australian rules footballer.
- Charles Patrick Fitzgerald, 90, British historian and writer.
- Eddie Fontaine, 65, American actor and singer, esophageal cancer.
- Feza Gürsey, 71, Turkish physicist, prostate cancer.
- Brian Oulton, 84, English actor.
- Daniel Pollock, 23, Australian film actor (Romper Stomper), suicide.
- Ray Roberts, 79, American politician, member of the United States House of Representatives (1962-1981).
- Maurice Sauvé, 68, Canadian politician.
- Firudin Shamoyev, 30, Azerbaijani soldier and war hero, killed in action
- Steve Shemo, 77, American baseball player (Boston Braves).
- Stuart Surridge, 74, English cricketer.
- Pierre Toulgouat, 90, French sculptor.
- Martin T. Williams, 67, American music critic and writer.

=== 14 ===
- Horacio Martínez, 79, Dominican baseball player.
- David Miller, 82, American film director, cancer.
- Artur Mkrtchyan, 33, Nagorno-Karabakh politician, shot.
- Marshall D. Moran, 85, American Jesuit priest and missionary .
- Valeh Muslumov, 23, Azerbaijan soldier and war hero, killed in action.
- Sammy Price, 83, American pianist, heart attack.

=== 15 ===
- Otis Barton, 92, American deep-sea diver, inventor and actor.
- David Bosch, 62, South African missiologist and theologian, traffic collision.
- William Bridges-Maxwell, 62, Australian politician.
- Howard Sylvester Ellis, 93, American economist.
- Hans Maass, 80, German mathematician.
- Frank Richards, 82, American actor.
- Aleksandr Sevidov, 70, Soviet football coach and player, cancer.
- Héctor Trejo, 72, Chilean footballer.
- Ralph Weigel, 70, American baseball player (Cleveland Indians, Chicago White Sox, Washington Senators).
- James Zumberge, 68, American geologist and academic.

=== 16 ===
- Gilbert Alsop, 83, English footballer.
- Neville Brand, 71, American actor, emphysema.
- James Gallagher, 82, American soccer player and Olympian (1928).
- Wojciech Kubik, 39, Polish Olympic luger (1972).
- Ivan McAlpine, 84, Australian rules footballer.
- Andy Russell, 72, American singer, complications from a stroke.
- Sisto Scilligo, 80, Italian Alpini soldier and skier.
- Fred Shook, 73, American football player (Chicago Cardinals).
- Bhalindra Singh, 72, Indian cricket player.

=== 17 ===
- Maurice Buckmaster, 90, British Special Operations Executive operative.
- Arthur Calder-Marshall, 83, English novelist, essayist, and biographer.
- Arkady Chernyshev, 78, Soviet ice hockey, soccer and bandy player.
- John DeVries, 76, American lyricist, interior designer and illustrator, complications after surgery.
- Skeets Herfurt, 80, American jazz musician.
- Hank Penny, 73, American musician.

=== 18 ===
- H. V. Kershaw, 73, British television scriptwriter and producer.
- Pat Thomson, 51, English-Australian actress, aneurysm.
- John Thorp, 79, American aeronautical engineer.
- Paul Zaeske, 46, American gridiron football player (Houston Oilers).

=== 19 ===
- Pierre Descamps, 75, Belgian politician.
- Frankie Howerd, 75, English actor and comedian, heart failure.
- Batia Lishansky, 92, Russian-Israeli sculptor.
- C. C. Too, 72, Malaysian diplomat.

=== 20 ===
- Marcel Albers, 24, Dutch racing driver, racing accident.
- Pat Creeden, 85, American baseball player (Boston Red Sox).
- Marjorie Gestring, 69, American Olympic diver (1936).
- Orval Grove, 72, American baseball player (Chicago White Sox).
- Benny Hill, 68, English comedian and actor (The Benny Hill Show), coronary thrombosis.
- Jimmy Lennon, 79, American boxing and professional wrestling announcer.
- Peter Murray, 72, British art historian and academic.
- Johnny Shines, 76, American musician, stroke.
- Larry St. Thomas, 73, American baseball player.
- Llewellyn Thomas, 88, British physicist and mathematician.
- Gian Carlo Wick, 82, Italian theoretical physicist.

=== 21 ===
- Mel Branch, 55, American gridiron football player (Dallas Texans/Kansas City Chiefs, Miami Dolphins).
- Louis Diercxsens, 93, Belgian Olympic field hockey player (1920, 1928).
- Gerald Feinberg, 58, American physicist.
- Robert Alton Harris, 39, American convicted murderer, execution by gas chamber.
- Väinö Linna, 71, Finnish author, cancer.
- Grand Duke Vladimir Kirillovich of Russia, 74, Russian monarch and head of the Imperial Family.
- Ioan Totu, 60, Romanian politician.
- Nigel Williams, 47, English conservator, heart attack.
- Ernest Yust, 64, Soviet-Hungarian footballer and coach.

=== 22 ===
- Steffi Duna, 82, Hungarian-American film actress.
- Pat Hills, 74, Australian politician.
- Kang Keqing, 80, Chinese politician.
- Harsono Tjokroaminoto, 79, Indonesian political figure.

=== 23 ===
- Tanka Prasad Acharya, 80, Nepali politician, prime minister (1956–1957), kidney disease.
- Nils Åkerlindh, 79, Swedish Olympic wrestler (1936).
- Ronnie Bucknum, 56, American race car driver, diabetes.
- Deron Johnson, 53, American baseball player, cancer.
- Hilda Kuper, 80, Rhodesian social anthropologist and writer.
- Satyajit Ray, 70, Indian filmmaker, heart failure.
- Omar Shendi, 76-77, Egyptian footballer and Olympian (1936).
- Eva Smits, 85, Dutch Olympic swimmer (1928).
- Michael Wagner, 44, American television writer and producer (Hill Street Blues, Star Trek: The Next Generation, Capitol Critters), brain cancer.
- Bror Östman, 63, Swedish ski jumper and Olympian (1952, 1956).

=== 24 ===
- Valdemārs Baumanis, 87, Latvian basketball player.
- Elio Chacón, 55, American baseball player (Cincinnati Reds, New York Mets).
- Samuel L. Greenberg, 93, American politician.
- Milton Rosenstock, 74, American conductor, composer, and arranger.

=== 25 ===
- Ernesto Balducci, 69, Italian Catholic priest and peace activist, traffic collision.
- Percy Ellis, 85, Australian sportsman.
- Bob Hazle, 61, American baseball player (Cincinnati Redlegs, Milwaukee Braves, Detroit Tigers).
- Brian MacLeod, 39, Canadian musician, brain cancer.
- George Mantello, 90, Hungarian diplomat and anti-fascist.
- Alfonso Flórez Ortiz, 39, Colombian racing cyclist, murdered.
- Yutaka Ozaki, 26, Japanese musician, pulmonary edema.
- Lin Richards, 83, Australian rules footballer.
- Danny Tuijnman, 77, Dutch politician.

=== 26 ===
- Livio Abramo, 88, Brazilian-Paraguayan visual artist.
- Julian Amyes, 74, British film director and producer.
- Jack Dunphy, 77, American novelist and playwright.
- Edgar Lewis, 90, Australian politician.
- Genowefa Minicka, 65, Polish Olympic sprinter (1952, 1956).
- Humberto Selvetti, 60, Argentine Olympic weightlifter (1952, 1956, 1964).
- Alberta Vaughn, 87, American actress, cancer.

=== 27 ===
- Sol K. Bright Sr., 82-83, American musician.
- Harlond Clift, 79, American baseball player (St. Louis Browns, Washington Senators)
- Olivier Messiaen, 83, French composer and ornithologist.
- Gerard K. O'Neill, 65, American physicist and space activist, leukemia.
- Jack Pritchard, 93, British entrepreneur.
- James Maude Richards, 84, British architectural writer.

=== 28 ===
- Hasan as-Senussi, 63-64, Libyan crown prince, head of the Libyan royal family (since 1969).
- Francis Bacon, 82, Irish-British painter, heart attack.
- Andria Balanchivadze, 85, Georgian composer.
- François Bégeot, 84, French Olympic long-distance runner (1932).
- Émile Carrara, 67, French road and track cyclist.
- Ryszard Ćwikła, 46, Polish Olympic alpine skier (1968).
- V. K. Gokak, 82, Indian Kannada writer and scholar.
- Parashkev Hadjiev, 80, Bulgarian composer.
- Allan Highet, 78, New Zealand politician.
- Elfed Davies, Baron Davies of Penrhys, 78, Welsh politician.
- Brian Pockar, 32, Canadian figure skater and Olympian (1980), AIDS-related complications.
- Iceberg Slim, 73, American novelist and pimp, liver failure.

=== 29 ===
- Mae Clarke, 81, American actress (Frankenstein, The Public Enemy), cancer.
- Chandrabati Devi, 82, Indian actress.
- Ghulam Faruque, 92, Pakistani industrialist and politician.
- Stephen Oliver, 42, English composer, AIDS-related complications.

=== 30 ===
- Agha, 78, Indian film actor, cardiovascular disease.
- Preston Bassett, 100, American aerospace engineer.
- Otto Bräutigam, 96, German diplomat and lawyer.
- Ramiz Ganbarov, 29, Azerbaijani officer and war hero, killed in action.
- Toivo Kärki, 76, Finnish composer, musician, and music producer.
- Katsuo Osugi, 47, Japanese baseball player.
