= Mehdi Abbasov =

National Hero of Azerbaijan

- Born: January 1, 1960; Aghvorik, Armenia
- Died: January 13, 1992 (aged 32); Məlikcanlı, Azerbaijan
- Military career
- Allegiance: Azerbaijan
- Service years: 1992
- Rank: Senior lieutenant
- Conflicts: First Nagorno-Karabakh War
- Awards: National Hero of Azerbaijan; 1992

Mehdi Abbasov (Azerbaijani: Mehdi Abbasov Yusif oğlu) (January 1, 1960, Aghvorik, Armenia – January 13, 1992, Məlikcanlı, Azerbaijan) was the National Hero of Azerbaijan, and the warrior of the First Nagorno-Karabakh War. He was also awarded the title of Master of Sports of the USSR.

== Biography ==
He was born on 1 January 1960 in the village of Aghvorik in Armenia. In 1977, Mehdi's family was expelled from Armenia and moved to Kulan village of Tulkubas region of the Kazakhstan. In 1980, Mehdi entered the Training Department of the Chimkent Pedagogical Institute and later continued his education at the Pedagogical Institute in Karagan.

== Military activities ==
Mehdi Abbasov was appointed to work at the Ministry of Internal Affairs of the Republic of Azerbaijan on June 28, 1991. He started working as Senior Lieutenant at the Ministry of Internal Affairs. The last battle of Mehdi was on January 13, 1992. He was one of the key figures during the battles around the village of Melikkan. Mehdi Abbasov was killed in a fight for the village of Melikkan.

== Memorial ==
Mehdi Abbasov was posthumously awarded the title of "National Hero of Azerbaijan" by the decree of the President of the Republic of Azerbaijan dated June 6, 1992, No. 831. He was buried in the Martyrs' Lane in Baku.

The former Rushan village of Ismayilli district is now called Mehdikand in honor of Mehdi Abbasov. One of the central streets of Ismailli district was named after him.

== Sources ==
- Vüqar Əsgərov, “Azərbaycanın Milli Qəhrəmanları” (Yenidən işlənmiş II nəşr), Bakı, "Dərələyəz-M", 2010. səh.12-13.
