= 1992 in film =

The year 1992 in film involved many significant film releases.

== Highest-grossing films ==
The top 10 films released in 1992 by worldwide gross are as follows:

Highest-grossing films of 1992
Rank	Title	Distributor	Worldwide gross
1	Aladdin	Buena Vista	$504,050,219
2	The Bodyguard	Warner Bros.	$411,006,740
3	Home Alone 2: Lost in New York	20th Century Fox	$358,994,850
4	Basic Instinct	TriStar	$352,927,224
5	Lethal Weapon 3	Warner Bros.	$321,731,527
6	Batman Returns	Warner Bros.	$266,822,354
7	A Few Good Men	Columbia	$243,240,178
8	Sister Act	Buena Vista	$231,605,150
9	Bram Stoker's Dracula	Columbia	$215,862,692
10	Wayne's World	Paramount	$183,097,323

== Events ==
- August 24 – Production begins on Jurassic Park (1993).
- October 29 – After just 15 months in the role, Brandon Tartikoff resigns as chairman of Paramount Pictures.
- November 2 – 20th Century Fox chairman Joe Roth announces he is leaving to set up an independent production company at Walt Disney Studios. Roth was replaced by Peter Chernin.

== Awards ==
Category/Organization	50th Golden Globe Awards January 23, 1993		46th BAFTA Awards March 21, 1993	65th Academy Awards March 29, 1993
Category/Organization	Drama	Musical and/or Comedy	46th BAFTA Awards March 21, 1993	65th Academy Awards March 29, 1993
Best Film	Scent of a Woman	The Player	Howards End	Unforgiven
Best Director	Clint Eastwood; Unforgiven		Robert Altman; The Player	Clint Eastwood; Unforgiven
Best Actor	Al Pacino; Scent of a Woman	Tim Robbins; The Player	Robert Downey Jr. Chaplin	Al Pacino; Scent of a Woman
Best Actress	Emma Thompson; Howards End	Miranda Richardson; Enchanted April	Emma Thompson; Howards End	
Best Supporting Actor	Gene Hackman; Unforgiven			
Best Supporting Actress	Joan Plowright; Enchanted April		Miranda Richardson; Damage	Marisa Tomei; My Cousin Vinny
Best Screenplay, Adapted	Bo Goldman; Scent of a Woman		Michael Tolkin; The Player	Ruth Prawer Jhabvala; Howards End
Best Screenplay, Original	Bo Goldman; Scent of a Woman		Woody Allen; Husbands and Wives	Neil Jordan; The Crying Game
Best Original Score	Aladdin; Alan Menken		Strictly Ballroom; David Hirschfelder	Aladdin; Alan Menken
Best Original Song	"A Whole New World"; Aladdin		N/A	"A Whole New World"; Aladdin
Best Foreign Language Film	Indochine		Raise the Red Lantern	Indochine

Palme d'Or (Cannes Film Festival):

The Best Intentions (Den goda viljan), directed by Bille August, Denmark / Sweden

Golden Lion (Venice Film Festival):

The Story of Qiu Ju (Qiū jú dǎ guānsī), directed by Zhang Yimou, China

Golden Bear (Berlin Film Festival):

Grand Canyon, directed by Lawrence Kasdan, United States

People's Choice Award (Toronto International Film Festival):

Strictly Ballroom, directed by Baz Luhrmann, Australia

== 1992 films ==
=== By country/region ===
- List of American films of 1992
- List of Argentine films of 1992
- List of Australian films of 1992
- List of Bangladeshi films of 1992
- List of British films of 1992
- List of Canadian films of 1992
- List of French films of 1992
- List of Hong Kong films of 1992
- List of Indian films of 1992
  - List of Hindi films of 1992
  - List of Kannada films of 1992
  - List of Malayalam films of 1992
  - List of Marathi films of 1992
  - List of Tamil films of 1992
  - List of Telugu films of 1992
- List of Japanese films of 1992
- List of Mexican films of 1992
- List of Pakistani films of 1992
- List of Russian films of 1992
- List of South Korean films of 1992
- List of Spanish films of 1992

=== By genre/medium ===
- List of action films of 1992
- List of animated feature films of 1992
- List of avant-garde films of 1992
- List of crime films of 1992
- List of comedy films of 1992
- List of drama films of 1992
- List of horror films of 1992
- List of science fiction films of 1992
- List of thriller films of 1992
- List of western films of 1992

== Births ==
- January 5
  - Mike Faist, American actor
  - Suki Waterhouse, English actress, model and singer
- January 8 – Dali Benssalah, French-Algerian actor
- January 11 – Laysla De Oliveira, Canadian actress
- January 19 – Logan Lerman, American actor
- January 23 – Jack Reynor, Irish-American actor
- January 27
  - James Bloor, English writer and actor
  - Connor Widdows, Canadian former child actor
- January 31
  - Nabiyah Be, Brazilian actress and singer
  - Lincoln Younes, Australian actor
- February 6 – Nora Fatehi, Canadian actress, model, dancer, singer, and producer
- February 9 – Avan Jogia, Canadian actor
- February 10 – Karen Fukuhara, Japanese-American actress
- February 11
  - Blair Dunlop, English folk musician and actor
  - Georgia Groome, English actress
  - Taylor Lautner, American actor
  - Victoria Loke, Singaporean actress
  - Thomas Turgoose, English actor
- February 14 – Freddie Highmore, English actor
- February 15 – Greer Grammer, actress
- February 16 – Jimmy Tatro, American actor, comedian, writer and YouTube personality
- February 19 – Camille Kostek, American television personality and actress
- February 20 – Ray Nicholson, American actor
- February 23 – Samara Weaving, Australian actress and model
- February 25 – Rose Matafeo, New Zealand comedian, actress and television presenter
- February 26 – Toby Sebastian, British actor and musician
- February 29 – Jessie T. Usher, American actor
- March 5 – Amber Anderson, English actress and model
- March 7 – Bel Powley, English actress
- March 10
  - Emily Osment, American actress
  - Sawyer Spielberg, American actor and director
- March 12 – Austin Swift, American actor
- March 13
  - George MacKay, British actor
  - Kaya Scodelario, British actress
- March 15
  - Sosie Bacon, American actress
  - Anna Shaffer, British actress
- March 16
  - Diego Calva, Mexican actor
  - Kim Mi-soo, South Korean actress and model (died 2022)
- March 17
  - Eliza Bennett, English actress and singer
  - John Boyega, British actor
- March 25
  - Elizabeth Lail, American actress
  - Joana Ribeiro, Portuguese actress
- March 26 – Haley Ramm, American actress
- March 28 – Daisy Bevan, English actress
- March 31
  - Caitlin Carver, American actress
  - Phil Dunster, English actor
- April 2 – Sammi Kane Kraft, American baseball player, musician and actress (died 2012)
- April 4 – Alexa Nikolas, actress
- April 8 – Shelby Young, American voice actress
- April 10 – Daisy Ridley, English actress
- April 11 – Jessica Madsen, English actress
- April 12 – Giorgio Cantarini, Italian actor
- April 14 - Humberly González, Venezuelan-Canadian actress
- April 16 – Valentina Bellè, Italian actress
- April 18 – Chloe Bennet, American actress and singer
- April 20 – Bestemsu Özdemir, Turkish actress
- April 23 – Syd tha Kyd, singer and DJ
- April 24
  - Joe Keery, American actor and musician
  - Jack Quaid, American actor
  - Doc Shaw, American actor
- April 25 – Adria Arjona, American actress
- April 27 – Morgan Berry, American voice actress
- May 4
  - Courtney Jines, actress
  - Ashley Rickards, actress
  - Miles Robbins, American musician and actor
- May 7 – Alexander Ludwig, actor
- May 10 – Sophie Vavasseur, Irish actress
- May 12 – Malcolm David Kelley, American rapper, singer-songwriter and actor
- May 16 – Davika Hoorne, Thai actress
- May 18 – Spencer Breslin, American actor
- May 19 – Eleanor Tomlinson, English actress
- May 20 – Jack Gleeson, Irish actor
- May 21 – Olivia Olson, American actress and singer-songwriter
- May 24 – Travis T. Flory, American singer and actor
- May 29
  - Erica Lindbeck, actress, voice actress
  - Gregg Sulkin, English actor
- June 2 – Ethan Slater, American actor and singer
- June 3 – Dilraba Dilmurat, Chinese actress
- June 10 – Kate Upton, American model and actress
- June 11 – Anna Sawai, New Zealand actress and singer of Japanese descent
- June 12
  - Georgina Campbell, English actress
  - Ryan Malgarini, American actor
- June 14 – Daryl Sabara, actor
- June 23 – Yoson An, Chinese-born New Zealand actor and filmmaker
- June 26 – Jennette McCurdy, actress and singer
- June 27
  - Emma D'Arcy, English actor
  - Vanessa Grasse, English actress
- June 28 – Niamh Algar, Irish actress
- June 29 – Souheila Yacoub, Swiss actress
- June 30 – Chay Suede, Brazilian actor
- July 1 – Rhea Chakraborty, Indian actress
- July 3 – Nathalia Ramos, actress
- July 4 – Francesca Hayward, ballerina, actress, and singer
- July 7 – Manjot Singh, Indian actor
- July 8
  - Sky Ferreira, American singer-songwriter and actress
  - Yvette Monreal, American actress
- July 9 – Douglas Booth, actor
- July 10 – Kelley Mack, American actress (died 2025)
- July 12 – Woo Do-hwan, South Korean actor
- July 13 – Ahney Her, American actress
- July 15 – Vaishali Takkar, Indian actress (died 2022)
- July 17
  - Jonno Davies, English actor
  - Billie Lourd, American actress
- July 20
  - Paige Hurd, American actress
  - Jordan Rodrigues, Australian actor
- July 22
  - Selena Gomez, Mexican-American actress and singer
  - Aleksandr Kuznetsov, Ukrainian-Russian actor
- July 23
  - Tosin Cole, American-British actor
  - Britne Oldford, Canadian-American actress
- July 30 – Julia Ragnarsson, actress
- August 1 - Ben Rosenfield, American actor and musician
- August 2
  - Charli XCX, English singer
  - Hallie Eisenberg, American former child actress
- August 3 – Christine Ko, actress
- August 4 – Dylan and Cole Sprouse, actors
- August 12 – Cara Delevingne, British actress and model
- August 20
  - Neslihan Atagül, actress
  - Demi Lovato, actress and singer
- August 21 - RJ Mitte, American actor (died 2026)
- August 22
  - Keith Powers, American actor
  - Ari Stidham, American actor
- August 25 – Blake Jenner, American actor
- August 30 – Jessica Henwick, English actress, writer and director
- August 31 – Talon Warburton, American actor
- September 11 – Vinnie Bennett, New Zealand actor
- September 12 – Alexia Fast, Canadian actress
- September 16 – Nick Jonas, singer (Jonas Brothers)
- September 17 – Danny Ramirez, Hispanic-American actor
- September 27 – Sam Lerner, American actor
- September 28
  - Skye McCole Bartusiak, American actress (died 2014)
  - Keir Gilchrist, Canadian actor
- September 30
  - Baifern, Thai actress
  - Ezra Miller, American actor
- October 1 – Christopher O'Shea, English actor
- October 3 – Lyna Khoudri, French-Algerian actress
- October 8 – Tom Rhys Harries, Welsh actor
- October 9 – Tyler James Williams, actor
- October 10 – John McCrea, British actor and singer
- October 11 – Cardi B, Dominican-American rapper and actress
- October 12 – Josh Hutcherson, actor
- October 13 – Aaron Dismuke, voice actor
- October 15
  - Ncuti Gatwa, Rwandan-Scottish actor
  - Vincent Martella, American actor, voice actor and singer
- October 17
  - Nanami Sakuraba, Japanese actress
  - Barry Keoghan, Irish actor
- October 21
  - Hari Nef, American actress
  - Natasha Bassett, Australian actress
- October 30 – Tequan Richmond, American actor and rapper
- October 31 – Vanessa Marano, American actress
- November 6 – Robert Aramayo, English actor
- November 7 – Mary Chieffo, American actress
- November 10 – Bidya Sinha Saha Mim, Bangladeshi actress and model
- November 11 – Ashleigh Cummings, Australian actress
- November 18
  - John Karna, American actor
  - Nathan Kress, American actor
- November 23 – Miley Cyrus, American actress and singer
- November 28 – Adam Hicks, American actor and rapper
- November 30 – Oka Giner, Mexican actress
- December 8 – Katie Stevens, American actress and singer
- December 10 – Melissa Roxburgh, Canadian actress
- December 13 - Dawn M. Bennett, American voice actress
- December 14 – Tori Kelly, American singer, songwriter, actress and record producer
- December 17
  - Jordan Garrett, American actor
  - Thomas Law, English actor
- December 18 – Bridgit Mendler, American singer and actress
- December 22 – Shioli Kutsuna, Japanese-Australian actress
- December 23 – Spencer Daniels, American actor

== Deaths ==
Month	Date	Name	Age	Country	Profession	Notable films
January	1	M. J. Frankovich	82	US	Producer	Cactus Flower; The Shootist
January	2	Virginia Field	74	UK	Actress	A Connecticut Yankee in King Arthur's Court; Dream Girl
January	3	Judith Anderson	94	Australia	Actress	Rebecca; Cat on a Hot Tin Roof
January	7	Richard Hunt	40	US	Puppeteer, Actor	The Muppet Movie; Trading Places
January	7	Andrew Marton	87	Hungary	Director	The Longest Day; The Thin Red Line
January	8	Anthony Dawson	75	UK	Actor	Dr. No; Dial M for Murder
January	8	Marjorie Kane	82	US	Actress	Border Romance; Billboard Girl
January	9	Steve Brodie	72	US	Actor	Out of the Past; Donovan's Brain
January	9	Bill Naughton	81	Ireland	Screenwriter	Alfie; The Family Way
January	15	Hari Rhodes	59	US	Actor	Detroit 9000; Conquest of the Planet of the Apes
January	17	Dorothy Alison	66	Australia	Actress	Reach for the Sky; The Scamp
January	18	Ruby R. Levitt	84	US	Set Decorator	The Sound of Music; Chinatown
January	23	Freddie Bartholomew	67	UK	Actor	Captains Courageous; Little Lord Fauntleroy
January	23	Ian Wolfe	95	US	Actor	Rebel Without a Cause; Dick Tracy
January	24	Ken Darby	82	US	Composer, Lyricist	How the West Was Won; The King and I
January	26	José Ferrer	79	Puerto Rico	Actor, Director	Cyrano de Bergerac; The Caine Mutiny
January	27	Gwen Ffrangcon-Davies	101	UK	Actress	The Devil Rides Out; The Witches
February	1	Dick York	63	US	Actor	Inherit the Wind; They Came to Cordura
February	4	John Dehner	76	US	Actor	Man of the West; The Left Handed Gun
February	8	Baruch Lumet	93	US	Actor	The Killer Shrews; The Pawnbroker
February	9	Jack Kinney	82	US	Director, Animator	Dumbo; Pinocchio
February	10	Fred Hynes	83	US	Sound Engineer	The Sound of Music; West Side Story
February	11	Ray Danton	60	US	Actor	I'll Cry Tomorrow; The Rise and Fall of Legs Diamond
February	13	Dorothy Tree	85	US	Actress	Abe Lincoln in Illinois; The Asphalt Jungle
February	24	Doreen Montgomery	79	UK	Screenwriter	Dead Men Tell No Tales; The Second Mr. Bush
March	2	Robert Clatworthy	80	US	Art Director, Production Designer	Psycho; Ship of Fools
March	2	Sandy Dennis	54	US	Actress	Who's Afraid of Virginia Woolf?; Sweet November
March	3	Robert Beatty	82	Canada	Actor	2001: A Space Odyssey; Where Eagles Dare
March	4	Néstor Almendros	61	Spain	Cinematographer	Days of Heaven; Kramer vs Kramer
March	4	Art Babbitt	84	US	Animator	Snow White and the Seven Dwarfs; Fantasia
March	11	László Benedek	87	Hungary	Director	Death of a Salesman; The Wild One
March	11	Richard Brooks	85	US	Director, Screenwriter	Elmer Gantry; Blackboard Jungle
March	14	Jean Poiret	65	France	Actor, Screenwriter, Director	Cop au Vin; La Cage aux Folles
March	15	Helen Deutsch	85	US	Screenwriter	The Unsinkable Molly Brown; Valley of the Dolls
March	17	Jack Arnold	79	US	Director	Creature from the Black Lagoon; The Mouse That Roared
March	17	Franklin R. Levy	43	US	Producer	Nighthawks; Homeward Bound: The Incredible Journey
March	17	Grace Stafford	88	US	Actress	Indianapolis Speedway; Confessions of a Nazi Spy
March	18	Arnold Diamond	76	UK	Actor	Fiddler on the Roof; The Italian Job
March	19	Cesare Danova	66	Italy	Actor	Viva Las Vegas; Animal House
March	20	Georges Delerue	67	France	Composer	A Little Romance; Anne of the Thousand Days
March	21	John Ireland	82	Canada	Actor	All the King's Men; Red River
March	22	Melissa Stribling	65	UK	Actress	Dracula; The Secret Partner
March	25	Nancy Walker	69	US	Actress, Director	Murder by Death; Can't Stop the Music
March	28	Wendell Mayes	72	US	Screenwriter	Anatomy of a Murder; The Poseidon Adventure
March	29	Paul Henreid	84	Hungary	Actor	Casablanca; Now, Voyager
March	29	Archie Marshek	90	US	Film Editor	The Most Dangerous Game; This Gun for Hire
April	3	Karl Tunberg	85	US	Screenwriter	Ben Hur; Where Were You When the Lights Went Out?
April	5	Molly Picon	92	US	Actress	Fiddler on the Roof; Come Blow Your Horn
April	6	Andy Russell	72	US	Singer, Actor	The Stork Club; Copacabana
April	10	Cec Linder	71	Poland	Actor	Goldfinger; Lolita
April	11	James Brown	72	US	Actor	Going My Way; Objective, Burma!
April	14	David Miller	82	US	Director	Lonely Are the Brave; Captain Newman, M.D.
April	16	Neville Brand	71	US	Actor	D.O.A.; Stalag 17
April	18	Pat Thomson	51	UK	Actress	Evil Angels; Strictly Ballroom
April	19	Frankie Howerd	75	UK	Actor	The Ladykillers; Sgt. Pepper's Lonely Hearts Club Band
April	20	Mae Clarke	81	US	Actress	The Public Enemy; Frankenstein
April	20	Benny Hill	68	UK	Actor	The Italian Job; Chitty Chitty Bang Bang
April	22	Steffi Duna	82	Hungary	Actress	Way Down South; Panama Lady
April	22	Rosemary Odell	67	US	Costume Designer	To Kill a Mockingbird; Beau Geste
April	23	Satyajit Ray	70	India	Director, Screenwriter	Aparajito; The World of Apu
May	3	George Murphy	89	US	Actor, Dancer	Broadway Melody of 1938; Show Business
May	6	Marlene Dietrich	90	Germany	Actress	The Blue Angel; Destry Rides Again
May	8	Richard Derr	73	US	Actor	When Worlds Collide; American Gigolo
May	10	John Lund	81	US	Actor	A Foreign Affair; High Society
May	12	Lenny Montana	66	US	Actor	The Godfather; The Jerk
May	12	Robert Reed	59	US	Actor	Star!; Bloodlust!
May	15	Bartlett Mullins	87	UK	Actor	Frankenstein Created Woman; Tales from the Crypt
May	16	Marisa Mell	53	Austria	Actress	Danger: Diabolik; Masquerade
May	18	Marshall Thompson	66	US	Actor	It! The Terror from Beyond Space; Battleground
May	26	Edmund Beloin	82	US	Screenwriter	The Harvey Girls; G.I. Blues
June	2	Philip Dunne	84	US	Screenwriter, Director	How Green Was My Valley; The Agony and the Ecstasy
June	3	Robert Morley	84	UK	Actor	The African Queen; Marie Antoinette
June	5	Laurence Naismith	83	UK	Actor	Diamonds Are Forever; Kind Hearts and Coronets
June	6	Larry Riley	38	US	Actor	A Soldier's Story; Long Gone
June	12	Renié Conley	90	US	Costume Designer	Cleopatra; Body Heat
June	12	Gerda Nicolson	54	Australia	Actress	Gallipoli; The Devil's Playground
June	24	Hans Reiser	73	Germany	Actor	The Great Escape; A Song Goes Round the World
June	22	Chuck Mitchell	64	US	Actor	Porky's; Better Off Dead
June	22	Frederic I. Rinaldo	78	US	Screenwriter	Abbott and Costello Meet Frankenstein; The Black Cat
June	26	Phil Rubenstein	51	US	Actor	Tango & Cash; RoboCop 2
June	27	Allan Jones	84	US	Actor, Singer	A Night at the Opera; Show Boat
June	28	Joan Marshall	61	US	Actress	Homicidal; Shampoo
July	1	Franco Cristaldi	67	Italy	Producer	Cinema Paradiso; Divorce, Italian Style
July	12	Reginald Beck	90	UK	Film Editor	Hamlet; Modesty Blaise
July	23	Arletty	94	France	Actress	The Longest Day; Thunder Over Paris
July	23	Maxine Audley	69	UK	Actress	Peeping Tom; The Vikings
July	23	Amjad Khan	51	India	Actor	Sholay; Muqaddar Ka Sikandar
July	28	Lester Shorr	85	US	Cinematographer	Take the Money and Run; The Phantom Tollbooth
July	30	Brenda Marshall	76	US	Actress	Captains of the Clouds; The Sea Hawk
August	7	John Anderson	69	US	Actor	Ride the High Country; Psycho
August	12	James W. Payne	62	US	Set Decorator	The Sting; Come Blow Your Horn
August	16	Malcolm Atterbury	85	US	Actor	North by Northwest; The Birds
August	18	John Sturges	82	US	Director	Bad Day at Black Rock; The Great Escape
August	19	Gianni Polidori	68	Italy	Production Designer	My Name Is Nobody; Le Amiche
August	21	Charles Nichols	81	US	Director, Animator	Charlotte's Web; Pinocchio
August	23	Virginia Sale	93	US	Actress	Topper; Badman's Territory
August	25	George R. Nelson	65	US	Set Decorator	The Godfather Part II; Apocalypse Now
August	30	Hideo Gosha	63	Japan	Director	Goyokin; The Geisha
September	1	Morris Carnovsky	94	US	Actor	Cyrano de Bergerac; Dead Reckoning
September	4	John van Dreelen	70	Netherlands	Actor	Madame X; Topaz
September	6	Henry Ephron	81	US	Screenwriter	Carousel; Daddy Long Legs
September	6	Mervyn Johns	93	UK	Actor	Dead of Night; Scrooge
September	8	Carroll Young	83	US	Screenwriter	Tarzan Triumphs; Jungle Jim
September	12	H. F. Koenekamp	100	US	Special Effects Artist, Cinematographer	Air Force; Strangers on a Train
September	12	Ruth Nelson	87	US	Actress	Humoresque; Awakenings
September	12	Ed Peck	75	US	Actor	Bullitt; Heaven Can Wait
September	12	Anthony Perkins	60	US	Actor, Director	Psycho; Murder on the Orient Express
September	15	Michael Luciano	83	US	Film Editor	The Dirty Dozen; The Longest Yard
September	17	Feodor Chaliapin Jr.	86	Russia	Actor	The Name of the Rose; Moonstruck
September	18	Herbert W. Spencer	87	Chile	Orchestrator, Composer	Star Wars; Jesus Christ Superstar
September	21	Bill Williams	77	US	Actor	Deadline at Dawn; The Stratton Story
September	27	Keith Prentice	52	US	Actor	The Boys in the Band; Cruising
September	29	Paul Jabara	44	US	Actor, Songwriter	Thank God It's Friday; The Lords of Flatbush
September	29	Bill Rowe	61	UK	Sound Engineer	The Shining; Alien
September	30	Maria Malicka	92	Poland	Actress	Uwiedziona; Pan Twardowski
October	6	Denholm Elliott	70	UK	Actor	Raiders of the Lost Ark; A Room with a View
October	6	Natalie Moorhead	91	US	Actress	The Thin Man; Illicit
October	9	Ben Maddow	83	US	Screenwriter	The Asphalt Jungle; Johnny Guitar
October	12	John Hancock	51	US	Actor	A Soldier's Story; Crossroads
October	16	Shirley Booth	87	US	Actress	Come Back, Little Sheba; The Matchmaker
October	16	Anna Hill Johnstone	79	US	Costume Designer	The Godfather; Dog Day Afternoon
October	16	Vladek Sheybal	69	Poland	Actor	Red Dawn; From Russia with Love
October	21	Clem Portman	87	US	Sound Engineer	Out of the Past; In the Heat of the Night
October	22	Cleavon Little	53	US	Actor	Blazing Saddles; Vanishing Point
October	23	Dorothy Dunbar	90	US	Actress	Tarzan and the Golden Lion; The Amateur Gentleman
October	26	Laurel Cronin	53	US	Actress	Beethoven; Hook
November	2	Hal Roach	100	US	Director, Producer	Our Gang; Laurel and Hardy
November	6	Mark Rosenberg	44	US	Producer	Presumed Innocent; The Fabulous Baker Boys
November	7	Jack Kelly	65	US	Actor	A Fever in the Blood; She Devil
November	10	Chuck Connors	71	US	Actor	The Big Country; Move Over, Darling
November	12	Eddie Mayehoff	83	US	Actor	How to Murder Your Wife; Artists and Models
November	13	Alan Balsam	42	US	Film Editor	Revenge of the Nerds; Harlem Nights
November	17	Todd Armstrong	83	US	Actor	Jason and the Argonauts; King Rat
November	18	Dorothy Kirsten	82	US	Singer, Actress	The Great Caruso; Mr. Music
November	19	Diane Varsi	54	US	Actress	Peyton Place; Wild in the Streets
November	20	John Foreman	67	US	Producer	Butch Cassidy and the Sundance Kid; Prizzi's Honor
November	22	Sterling Holloway	87	US	Actor	The Many Adventures of Winnie the Pooh; The Jungle Book
November	22	Ronald Sinclair	68	New Zealand	Actor, Film Editor	A Christmas Carol; Five Little Peppers and How They Grew
November	23	Rita Corday	72	US	Actress	The Falcon in Hollywood; The Truth About Murder
November	26	Joby Blanshard	73	UK	Actor	Doomwatch; Hell Is a City
November	26	John Sharp	72	UK	Actor	Barry Lyndon; Top Secret!
November	29	Robert Shayne	92	US	Actor	Christmas in Connecticut; Nobody Lives Forever
November	29	Robert F. Simon	83	US	Actor	The Man Who Shot Liberty Valance; Operation Petticoat
December	2	Michael Gothard	53	UK	Actor	For Your Eyes Only; Lifeforce
December	6	Percy Herbert	72	UK	Actor	The Bridge on the River Kwai; The Guns of Navarone
December	6	Hank Worden	91	US	Actor	The Searchers; Red River
December	9	Franco Franchi	64	Italy	Actor	War Italian Style; Kaos
December	9	Vincent Gardenia	71	Italy	Actor	Moonstruck; Little Shop of Horrors
December	11	Michael Robbins	62	UK	Actor	On the Buses; Victor/Victoria
December	11	Walter M. Simonds	81	US	Art Director, Production Designer	The Omega Man; Marty
December	15	William Ware Theiss	61	US	Costume Designer	Harold and Maude; The Pink Panther
December	17	Dana Andrews	83	US	Actor	The Best Years of Our Lives; Laura
December	20	Steve Ross	65	US	Studio Executive	
December	22	Milo Sperber	81	UK	Actor	Billion Dollar Brain; The Spy Who Loved Me
December	25	Sandra Dorne	68	UK	Actress	Marilyn; The Bank Raiders

== Film debuts ==
- Gillian Anderson – The Turning
- David Arquette – Where the Day Takes You
- Jeanne Balibar – The Sentinel
- Maria Bello – Maintenance
- Tina Benko – Waterland
- Jack Black – Bob Roberts
- Cara Buono – Gladiator
- Max Casella – Newsies
- Toni Collette – Spotswood
- Daniel Craig – The Power of One
- Penélope Cruz – Jamón Jamón
- Chris Farley – Wayne's World
- Michael Cudlitz – A River Runs Through It
- Michael Culkin – Candyman
- Alan Cumming – Prague
- Liam Cunningham – Into the West
- Henry Czerny – Buried on Sunday
- Jeremy Davies – Guncrazy
- Eliza Dushku – That Night
- Bodhi Elfman – Sneakers
- Omar Epps – Juice
- Donald Faison – Juice
- Jon Favreau – Folks!
- Ralph Fiennes – Emily Brontë's Wuthering Heights
- Claire Forlani – Gypsy Eyes
- Jamie Foxx – Toys
- Benno Fürmann – Die ungewisse Lage des Paradieses
- Walton Goggins – Forever Young
- Adam Goldberg – Mr. Saturday Night
- Joseph Gordon-Levitt – Beethoven
- Michael A. Goorjian – Newsies
- Peter Greene – Laws of Gravity
- Natasha Gregson Wagner – Fathers & Sons
- Rhoda Griffis – Love Field
- Frank Grillo – The Mambo Kings
- Maggie Gyllenhaal – Waterland
- Cole Hauser – School Ties
- Lena Headey – Waterland
- Katherine Heigl – That Night
- Elaine Hendrix – Last Dance
- Whitney Houston - The Bodyguard
- Famke Janssen – Fathers & Sons
- Toby Jones – Orlando
- Bodil Jørgensen – Mirror of the Planet
- Ashley Judd – Kuffs
- Shah Rukh Khan – Deewana
- Thomas Kretschmann – Shining Through
- Vincent Laresca – Juice
- Ang Lee (director) – Pushing Hands
- Laura Linney – Lorenzo's Oil
- Lucy Liu – Rhythm of Destiny
- Ron Livingston – Straight Talk
- Donal Logue – Sneakers
- Sergi López – La petite amie d'Antonio
- Faizon Love – Bebe's Kids
- Baz Luhrmann (director) – Strictly Ballroom
- Bernie Mac – Mo' Money
- Byron Mann – Ghost Ship
- Chi McBride – The Distinguished Gentleman
- Debra Monk – Prelude to a Kiss
- Marguerite Moreau – The Mighty Ducks
- Elise Neal – Malcolm X
- Tim Blake Nelson – This Is My Life
- Thomas Ian Nicholas – Radio Flyer
- Jeremy Northam – Emily Brontë's Wuthering Heights
- Jack Noseworthy – Encino Man
- Michael Rapaport – Zebrahead
- Michael Rispoli – Night and the City
- Robert Rodriguez (director) – El Mariachi
- Matthias Schoenaerts – Daens
- Matt Servitto – Mad Dog Coll
- M. Night Shyamalan (director) – Praying with Anger
- Ingvar Sigurðsson – Ingaló
- Will Smith – Where the Day Takes You
- Martin Starr – Hero
- Hilary Swank – Buffy the Vampire Slayer
- Quentin Tarantino (director) – Reservoir Dogs
- Jeanne Tripplehorn – Basic Instinct
- Robin Tunney – Encino Man
- Karl Urban – Chunuk Bair
- Yul Vazquez – The Mambo Kings
- John Ventimiglia – Swoon
- Madeline Zima – The Hand That Rocks the Cradle
