= Hello, Dolly! (musical) =

1964 Broadway musical

- 1964 Broadway poster
- Music: Jerry Herman
- Lyrics: Jerry Herman
- Book: Michael Stewart
- Basis: The Matchmaker by Thornton Wilder
- Premiere: November 16, 1963: Fisher Theatre, Detroit
- Productions: 1964 Broadway; 1965 West End; 1975 Broadway revival 1978 Broadway revival 1995 Broadway revival 2009 West End revival 2017 Broadway revival 2018 US tour 2024 West End revival
- Awards: 1964 Tony Award for Best Musical; 1964 Tony Award for Best Book of a Musical; 1964 Tony Award for Best Original Score; 2010 Laurence Olivier Award for Best Musical Revival; 2017 Tony Award for Best Revival of a Musical

Hello, Dolly! is a 1964 musical with lyrics and music by Jerry Herman and a book by Michael Stewart, based on Thornton Wilder's 1938 farce The Merchant of Yonkers, which Wilder revised and retitled The Matchmaker in 1954. The musical follows the story of Dolly Gallagher Levi, a strong-willed matchmaker, as she travels to Yonkers, New York, to find a match for the miserly "well-known unmarried half-a-millionaire" Horace Vandergelder.

Hello, Dolly! debuted at the Fisher Theater in Detroit on November 18, 1963, directed and choreographed by Gower Champion and produced by David Merrick. It starred stage performer Carol Channing as Dolly Gallagher Levi, a role theatrical audiences of the world would forever associate with her. The show moved to Broadway in 1964, winning 10 Tony Awards, including Best Musical and Best Actress in a Musical. The awards earned set a record which the play held for 37 years. The show album Hello, Dolly! An Original Cast Recording was inducted into the Grammy Hall of Fame in 2002. The album reached number one on the Billboard album chart on June 6, 1964, and was replaced the next week by Louis Armstrong's album Hello, Dolly! Louis Armstrong also was featured in the film version of the show, performing a small part of the song "Hello, Dolly!".

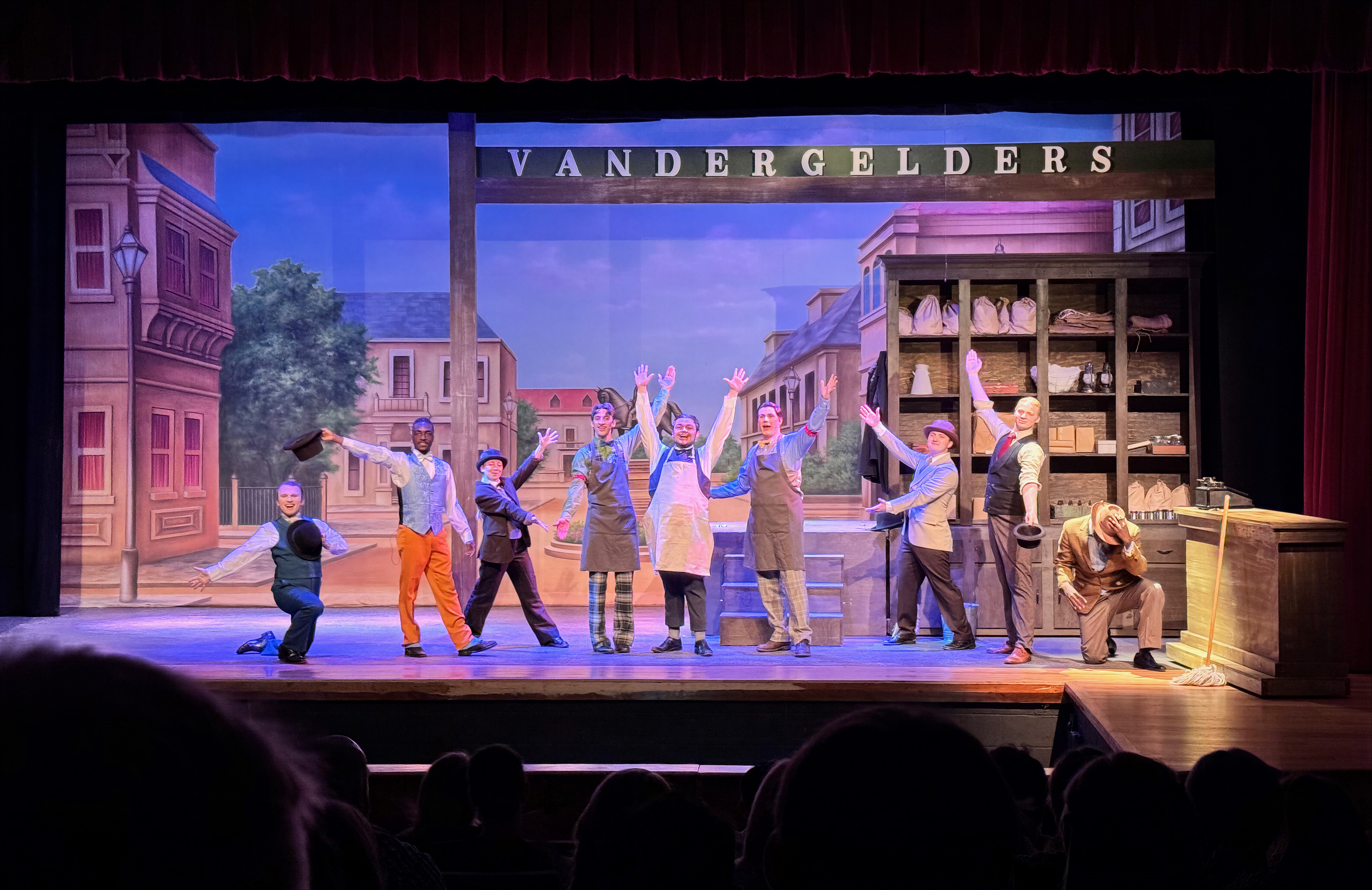
A scene from a college production of the musical at Lee University

The show has become one of the most enduring musical theater hits, with four Broadway revivals and international success. It was also made into the 1969 film Hello Dolly! by 20th Century Fox, which won three Academy Awards, including Best Score of a Musical Picture and was nominated in four other categories, including Best Picture at the 42nd Academy Awards.

== History ==
The plot of Hello, Dolly! originated in the 1835 English play A Day Well Spent by John Oxenford, which Johann Nestroy adapted into the farce Einen Jux will er sich machen (He Will Go on a Spree or He'll Have Himself a Good Time) in 1842. Thornton Wilder adapted Nestroy's play into his 1938 farcical play The Merchant of Yonkers. That play was a flop, so he revised it and retitled it as The Matchmaker in 1954, expanding the role of Dolly (played by Ruth Gordon).

The role of Dolly Gallagher Levi was originally written for Ethel Merman but she turned it down, as did Mary Martin—although both eventually played it. Merrick then auditioned Nancy Walker, but he hired Carol Channing, who then went on to originate the role of Dolly. Director Gower Champion was not the producer's first choice, but it was turned down by Hal Prince and others, among them Jerome Robbins and Joe Layton.

Hello, Dolly! had rocky tryouts in Detroit, Michigan, and Washington, D.C. After receiving the reviews, the creators made major changes to the script and score, including the addition of the song "Before the Parade Passes By". Initially called Dolly, A Damned Exasperating Woman, then Call on Dolly, Merrick revised the show's title after hearing Louis Armstrong's version of "Hello, Dolly". The show became one of the most iconic Broadway shows of the latter half of the 1960s, and running for 2,844 performances, was the longest-running musical in Broadway history for a time.

== Synopsis ==
Sources: Tams-Witmark Guide to Musical Theatre Masterworks Broadway

=== Act I ===
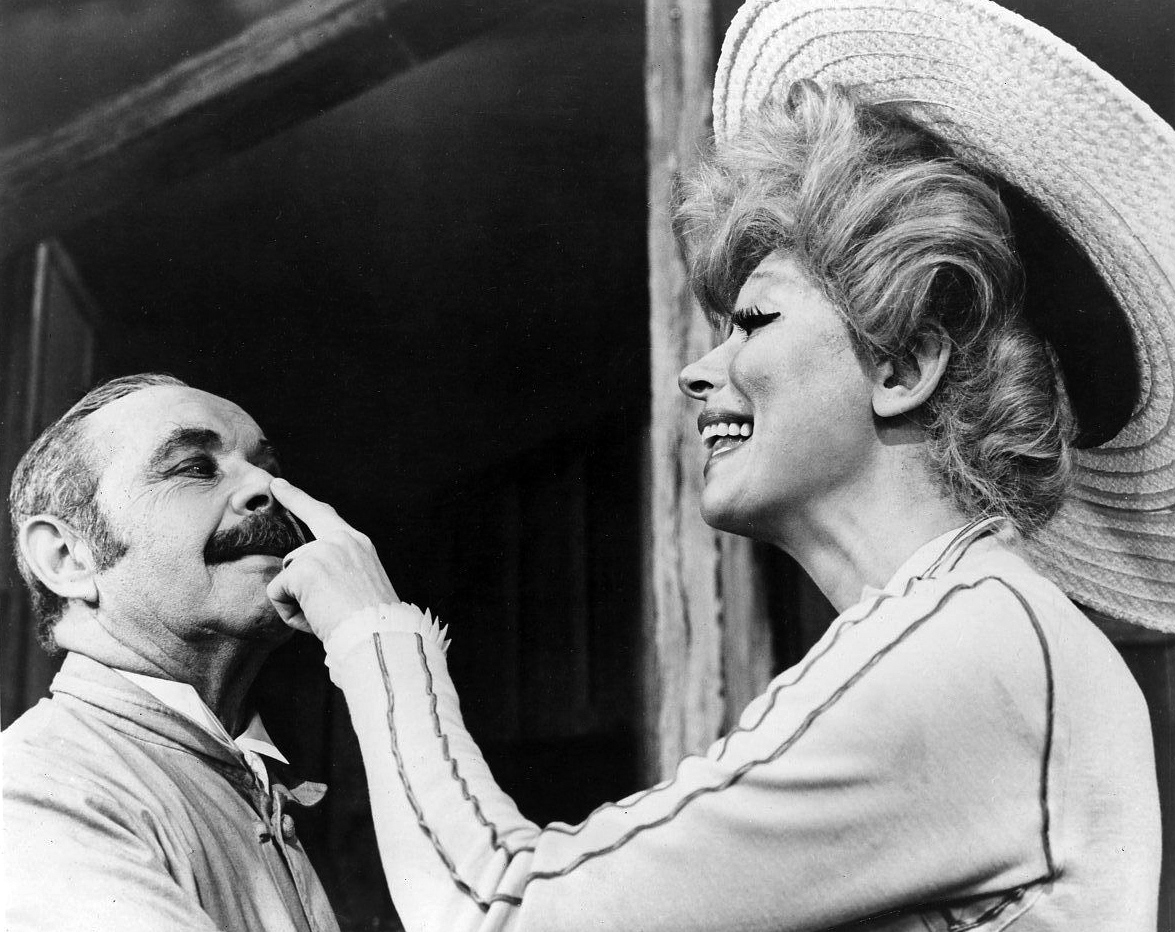
David Burns and Carol Channing in the original Broadway cast, 1964

As the 19th becomes the 20th century, all of New York City is excited because brassy widow Dolly Gallagher Levi is in town ("Call on Dolly"). Dolly makes a living through what she calls "meddling" – matchmaking and numerous sidelines, including dance instruction and mandolin lessons ("I Put My Hand In"). She is currently seeking a wife for grumpy Horace Vandergelder, the well-known half-a-millionaire, but it becomes clear that Dolly intends to marry Horace herself. Ambrose Kemper, a young artist, wants to marry Horace's weepy niece Ermengarde, but Horace opposes this because Ambrose's vocation does not guarantee a steady living. Ambrose enlists Dolly's help, and they travel to Yonkers to visit Horace, who is a prominent citizen there and owns Vandergelder's Hay and Feed.

Horace explains to his two clerks, Cornelius Hackl and Barnaby Tucker, that he is going to get married because he needs a wife to cheerfully do all the household chores ("It Takes a Woman"). He plans to travel with Dolly to New York City to march in the Fourteenth Street Association Parade and propose to the widow Irene Molloy, who owns a hat shop there. Dolly arrives in Yonkers and "accidentally" mentions that Irene's first husband might not have died of natural causes, and also mentions that she knows an heiress, Ernestina Money, who may be interested in Horace. Horace departs for New York and leaves Cornelius and Barnaby to mind the store in his absence.

Cornelius decides that he and Barnaby need to get out of Yonkers and have an adventure in New York. They blow up some tomato cans to create a terrible stench as a pretext to close the store. Dolly mentions that she knows two ladies in New York they should call on: Irene Molloy and her shop assistant, Minnie Fay. She tells Ermengarde and Ambrose that she will enter them in the polka competition at the upscale Harmonia Gardens Restaurant in New York City so Ambrose can demonstrate to Horace his ability to be a breadwinner. Cornelius, Barnaby, Ambrose, Ermengarde and Dolly all take the train to New York ("Put on Your Sunday Clothes").

Irene and Minnie open their hat shop for the afternoon. Irene wants a husband, but does not love Horace Vandergelder. She declares that she will wear an elaborate hat to impress a gentleman ("Ribbons Down My Back"). Cornelius and Barnaby arrive at the shop and pretend to be rich. Horace and Dolly arrive at the shop, and Cornelius and Barnaby hide from him. Irene inadvertently mentions that she knows Cornelius, and Dolly tells her and Horace that even though Cornelius is Horace's clerk by day, he is a notorious New York playboy by night. Minnie screams when she finds Cornelius hiding in the armoire. Horace is about to open the armoire himself, but Dolly, Irene and Minnie distract him with patriotic sentiments related to subjects like Betsy Ross and Battle of the Alamo shown in the famous lyrics "Alamo, remember the Alamo!" ("Motherhood March"). Cornelius sneezes, and Horace storms out, realizing there are men hiding in the shop, but not knowing they are his clerks.

Dolly arranges for Cornelius and Barnaby, who are still pretending to be rich, to take the ladies out to dinner to the Harmonia Gardens restaurant to make up for their humiliation. She teaches Cornelius and Barnaby how to dance since they always have dancing at such establishments ("Dancing"). Soon, Cornelius, Irene, Barnaby, and Minnie are happily dancing. They go to watch the great 14th Street Association Parade together. Alone, Dolly decides to put her dear departed husband Ephraim behind her and to move on with life ("Before the Parade Passes By"). She asks Ephraim's permission to marry Horace, requesting a sign from him. Dolly catches up with the annoyed Vandergelder, who has missed the whole parade, and she convinces him to give her matchmaking one more chance. She tells him that Ernestina Money would be perfect for him and asks him to meet her at the swanky Harmonia Gardens that evening.

=== Act II ===
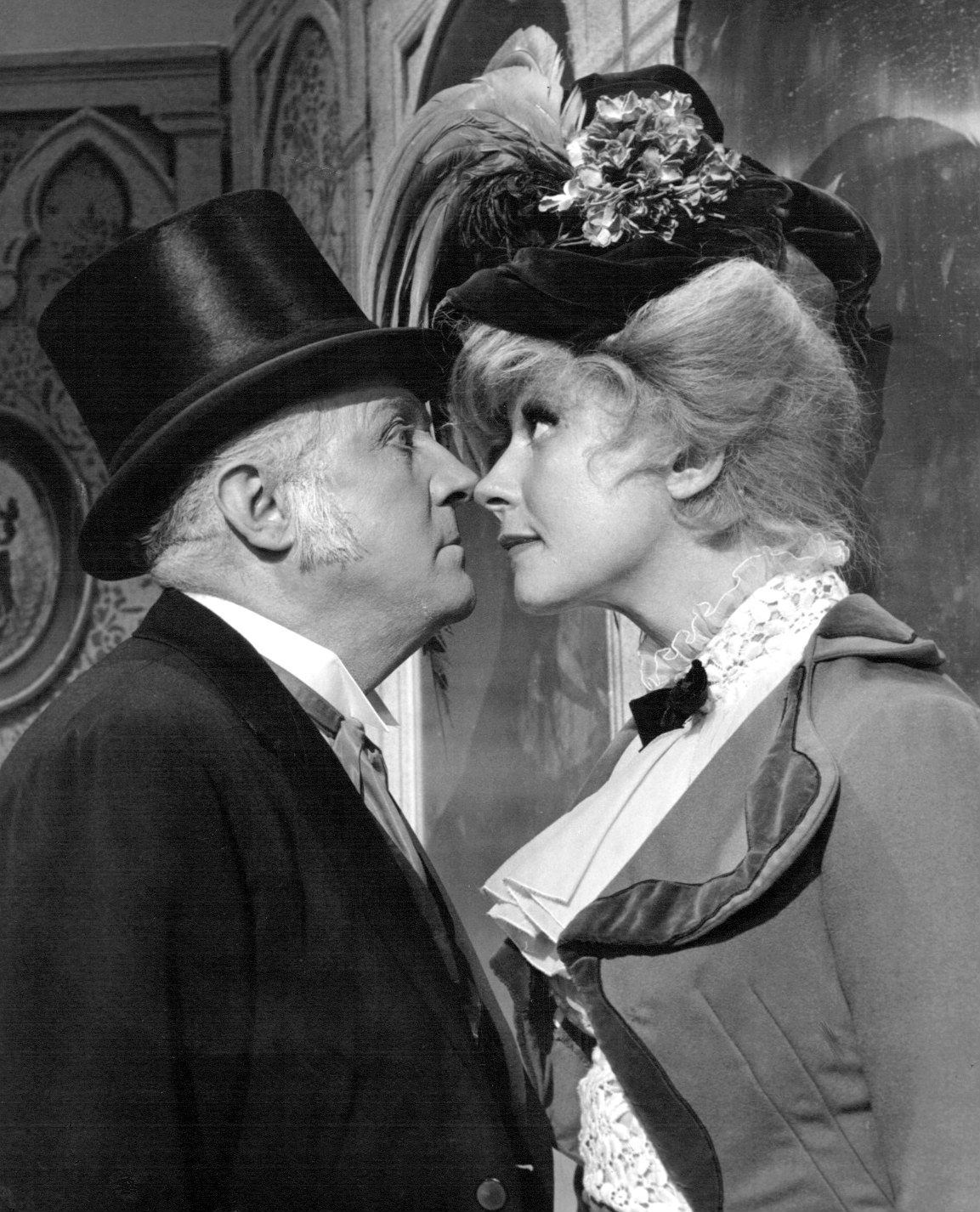
Milo Boulton and Carol Channing in one of several national tours, 1966

Cornelius is determined to get a kiss before the night is over, but Barnaby isn't so sure. As the clerks have no money for a carriage, they tell the girls that walking to the restaurant shows that they've got "Elegance". At the Harmonia Gardens Restaurant, Rudolph, the head waiter, prepares his service crew for Dolly Gallagher Levi's return: their usual lightning service, he tells them, must be "twice as lightning" ("The Waiters' Gallop"). Horace arrives with his date, but she proves neither as rich nor as elegant as Dolly had implied; furthermore she is soon bored by Horace and leaves, as Dolly had planned she would.

Cornelius, Barnaby, and their dates arrive, unaware that Horace is also dining at the restaurant. Irene and Minnie, inspired by the restaurant's opulence, order the menu's most expensive items. Cornelius and Barnaby grow increasingly anxious as they discover they have little more than a dollar left. Dolly makes her triumphant return to the Harmonia Gardens and is greeted in style by the staff ("Hello, Dolly!") She sits in the now-empty seat at Horace's table and proceeds to eat a large, expensive dinner, telling the exasperated Horace that no matter what he says, she will not marry him. Barnaby and Horace hail waiters at the same time, and in the ensuing confusion each drops his wallet and inadvertently picks up the other's. Barnaby is delighted that he can now pay the restaurant bill, while Horace finds only a little spare change. Barnabay and Cornelius realize that the wallet must belong to Horace. Cornelius, Irene, Barnaby and Minnie try to sneak out during "The Polka Contest", but Horace recognizes them and spots Ermengarde and Ambrose as well. The ensuing free-for-all culminates in a trip to night court.

Cornelius and Barnaby confess that they have no money and have never been to New York before. Cornelius declares that even if he has to dig ditches the rest of his life, he'll never forget the day because he had met Irene. Cornelius, Barnaby, and Ambrose then each profess their love for their companion ("It Only Takes A Moment"). Dolly convinces the judge that their only crime was being in love. The judge finds everyone innocent and cleared of all charges, but Horace is declared guilty and forced to pay damages. Dolly mentions marriage again, and Horace declares that he wouldn't marry her if she were the last woman in the world. Dolly angrily bids him goodbye ("So Long, Dearie"), telling him that while he's bored and lonely, she'll be living the high life.

The next morning, back at the hay and feed store, Cornelius and Irene, Barnaby and Minnie, and Ambrose and Ermengarde each set out on new life's paths. A chastened Horace Vandergelder finally admits that he needs Dolly in his life, but Dolly is unsure about the marriage until her late husband sends her a sign. Vandergelder spontaneously repeats a saying of Ephraim's: "Money is like manure. It's not worth a thing unless it's spread about, encouraging young things to grow." Horace tells Dolly life would be dull without her, and she promises in return that she'll "never go away again" ("Hello, Dolly" (reprise)).

== Characters ==
- Dolly Gallagher Levi: A widow in her middle years who has decided to begin her life again. She is a matchmaker, meddler, opportunist, and a life-loving woman.
- Horace Vandergelder: The proprietor of a Hay & Feed store and a client of Dolly Gallagher Levi's. A well-known half-a-millionaire and widower, he is gruff, authoritative, and set in his ways.
- Cornelius Hackl: Vandergelder's chief clerk who yearns for one exciting day in New York City. Energetic, enthusiastic, and adventurous young man who has a sweet innocence about him.
- Barnaby Tucker: An assistant to Cornelius at Vandergelder's Hay & Feed store. He is sweet, naïve, energetic, and a follower.
- Irene Molloy: A widow and a beautiful, smart, fun-loving milliner with a hat shop in New York City. Dolly has introduced her to Horace Vandergelder but she yearns for romance.
- Minnie Fay: A young girl who works in Irene's hat shop. Irene's assistant, she is naïve, strait-laced, fresh, and a follower.
- Ambrose Kemper: A young and explosive struggling artist seeking to marry Ermengarde.
- Ermengarde: The young niece of Horace Vandergelder. She cries often and wants her independence and to marry Ambrose.
- Ernestina Money: An eccentric-looking girl in need of Dolly's matchmaker services.
- Rudolph Reisenweber: Maître d'hôtel of the Harmonia Gardens restaurant.
- Judge: A white-whiskered night court judge. Easily moved to tears by romance.
- Mrs. Rose: An old friend of Dolly's.

== Cast and characters ==
| Character | Broadway | West End | Film | Broadway Revival | Broadway Revival | West End Revival | West End Revival | Broadway Revival | Off-West End Revival | Broadway Revival | US National Tour | West End Revival |
| Character | 1964 | 1965 | 1969 | 1975 | 1978 | 1979 | 1983 | 1995 | 2009 | 2017 | 2018 | 2024 |
|---|---|---|---|---|---|---|---|---|---|---|---|---|
| Dolly Gallagher Levi | Carol Channing | Mary Martin | Barbra Streisand | Pearl Bailey | Carol Channing | Carol Channing | Danny La Rue | Carol Channing | Samantha Spiro | Bette Midler | Betty Buckley | Imelda Staunton |
| Horace Vandergelder | David Burns | Loring Smith | Walter Matthau | Billy Daniels | Eddie Bracken | Eddie Bracken | Lionel Jeffries | Jay Garner | Allan Corduner | David Hyde Pierce | Lewis J. Stadlen | Andy Nyman |
| Cornelius Hackl | Charles Nelson Reilly | Garrett Lewis | Michael Crawford | Terrence Emanuel | Lee Roy Reams | Tudor Davies | Michael Sadler | Michael DeVries | Daniel Crossley | Gavin Creel | Nic Rouleau | Harry Hepple |
| Irene Molloy | Eileen Brennan | Marilynn Lovell | Marianne McAndrew | Mary Louise | Florence Lacey | Maureen Scott | Lorna Dallas | Florence Lacey | Josefina Gabrielle | Kate Baldwin | Analisa Leaming | Jenna Russell |
| Barnaby Tucker | Jerry Dodge | Johnny Beecher | Danny Lockin | Grenoldo Frazier | Robert Lydiard | Richard Drabble | Mark Haddigan | Cory English | Oliver Brenin | Taylor Trensch | Jess LeProtto | Tyrone Huntley |
| Minnie Fay | Sondra Lee | Coco Ramirez | E. J. Peaker | Chip Fields | Alexandra Korey | Mandy More | Pollyann Tanner | Lori Ann Mahl | Akiya Henry | Beanie Feldstein | Kristen Hahn | Emily Lane |
| Ermengarde | Alice Playten | Beverlee Weir | Joyce Ames | Karen Hubbard | K. T. Baumann | Angela Curran | Sue Latimer | Christine DeVito | Clare Louise Connolly | Melanie Moore | Morgan Kirner | Emily Langham |
| Ambrose Kemper | Igors Gavon | Mark Alden | Tommy Tune | Howard Porter | Michael C. Booker | Mike Fields | David Ellen | James Darrah | Mark Anderson | Will Burton | Garrett Hawe | Michael Lin |
| Ernestina | Mary Jo Catlett | Judith Drake | Judy Knaiz | Bessye Ruth Scott | P. J. Nelson | Veronica Clifford | Carol Kaye | Monica M. Wemitt | Annalisa Rossi | Jennifer Simard | Jessica Sheridan | Jodie Jacobs |
| Rudolph | David Hartman | Robert Hocknell | David Hurst | Jonathan Wynne | John Anania | Ian Burford | Jeremy Hawk | Steve Pudenz | Andy Hockley | Kevin Ligon | Wally Dunn | Paul Kemble |

=== Broadway cast replacements ===
==== Broadway 1964 ====
- Dolly Gallagher Levi: Pearl Bailey, Marie Bryant (standby), Thelma Carpenter, Ethel Merman, Novella Nelson (u/s), Phyllis Diller, Bibi Osterwald, Betty Grable, Martha Raye, Ginger Rogers
- Horace Vandergelder: Cab Calloway, Richard Deacon, Max Showalter
- Cornelius Hackl: Will Mackenzie, Russell Nype
- Barnaby Tucker: Danny Lockin (Reprising role from the 1969 film)
- Irene Molloy: Ernestine Jackson
- Minnie Fay: Georgia Engel, Leland Palmer
- Ernestina: Mabel King

==== Broadway 2017 ====
- Dolly Gallagher Levi: Bernadette Peters, Donna Murphy (alternate)
- Horace Vandergelder: Victor Garber
- Cornelius Hackl: Santino Fontana
- Barnaby Tucker: Charlie Stemp
- Ernestina: Alli Mauzey

==== U.S. Tour 2019 ====
- Dolly Gallagher Levi: Carolee Carmello
- Horace Vandergelder: John Bolton

== Musical numbers ==
Act I

- Overture – Orchestra
- "Call On Dolly" – Ensemble
- "I Put My Hand In" — Dolly
- "It Takes a Woman" — Horace, Men
- "It Takes a Woman (Reprise)" – Dolly
- "World, Take Me Back" – Dolly*
- "Put On Your Sunday Clothes" — Cornelius, Barnaby, Dolly, Ambrose, Ermengarde, and Ensemble
- "Ribbons Down My Back" — Irene
- "Ribbons Down My Back (Reprise)" – Irene
- "Motherhood March"— Dolly, Irene, and Minnie Fay
- "Dancing" — Dolly, Cornelius, Barnaby, Irene, Minnie Fay, and Ensemble
- "Love, Look in My Window" – Dolly*
- "Before the Parade Passes By" — Dolly and the Company**
- "Finale Act I: Before the Parade Passes By" – Dolly

Act II

- Entr'acte – Orchestra
- "Penny in My Pocket" – Vandergelder^
- "Elegance" – Cornelius, Barnaby, Irene, and Minnie Fay
- "The Waiters' Gallop" – Rudolph and the Waiters
- "Hello, Dolly!" – Dolly, Rudolph, Waiters, Cooks
- "The Waiters' Gallop (Reprise)" – Rudolph and Waiters
- "The Polka Contest" – Ambrose, Ermengarde, Irene, Cornelius, Minnie Fay, Barnaby, and the Contestants***
- "It Only Takes a Moment" – Cornelius, Irene, Ensemble
- "So Long Dearie" – Dolly
- "Hello, Dolly!" (Reprise) – Dolly and Vandergelder
- "Finale Act II: Hello, Dolly! / Dancing / It Only Takes a Moment / Put On Your Sunday Clothes / Hello, Dolly!" — The Company

*Song cut before Broadway Opening, reinstated when Ethel Merman joined to play Dolly.
**Song was not included in the original version. During the tryouts in Detroit, Gower Champion invited Charles Strouse and Lee Adams to consult on improvements to the musical. David Merrick was aware of their involvement, but Jerry Herman was not, even though Strouse was under the impression that Herman knew about it. Strouse and Adams suggested re-working the ending of Act I, wrote a new song "Before the Parade Passes By" and sent it to Champion. By the time the next set of tryouts in Washington began, a different number with the same name, written by Herman, was included in the show. After Strouse and Adams threatened to sue the production, they were given a songwriting credit for the song. That conflict led to an eight-year-long feud between Champion and Michael Stewart on one side and Strouse and Adams on the other. The official songwriting credits as listed with ASCAP have Adams, Herman and Strouse as co-writers.
***Song replaced "Come and Be My Butterfly" during Broadway Run.

^Horace Vandergelder's solo "Penny in My Pocket", although it received rave responses out of town, was cut prior to the Broadway opening for reasons of time. For the 2017 Broadway Revival, it was added back in as the opening of Act Two in front of the curtain. It is not, however, included in the licensed version for stock and amateur productions from Tams Witmark.

Herman said that Bob Merrill wrote the first eight bars and the opening lines for the song "Elegance," but he wrote the rest of the song. He considered it a "fifty-fifty job" between him and Merrill. "The Motherhood March" was also a Merrill-Herman collaboration.

== Productions ==
=== Original Broadway production ===
The musical, directed and choreographed by Gower Champion and produced by David Merrick, opened on January 16, 1964, at the St. James Theatre and closed on December 27, 1970, after 2,844 performances. Carol Channing starred as Dolly, with a supporting cast that included David Burns as Horace, Charles Nelson Reilly as Cornelius, Eileen Brennan as Irene, Jerry Dodge as Barnaby, Sondra Lee as Minnie Fay, Mary Jo Catlett as Ermengarde, and Igors Gavon as Ambrose. Although facing competition from Funny Girl with Barbra Streisand, Hello, Dolly! swept the Tony Awards in 1964, winning awards in ten categories (out of eleven nominations) that tied the musical with the previous record keeper South Pacific, a record that remained unbroken for 37 years until The Producers won twelve Tonys in 2001.

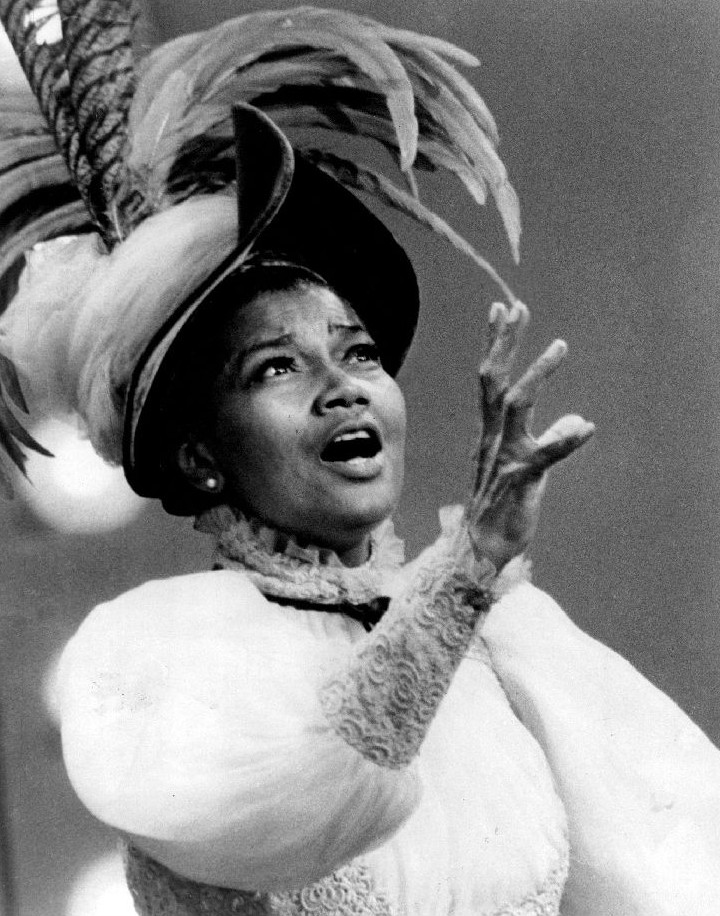
Pearl Bailey as Dolly, 1968.

After Channing left the show, Merrick employed prominent actresses to play Dolly, including Ginger Rogers, who started on August 9, 1965; Martha Raye, starting on February 27, 1967; Betty Grable, from June 12, 1967, to November 5, 1967; Pearl Bailey (in an all-black version with Cab Calloway as Horace) starting on November 12, 1967 (with Thelma Carpenter as her alternate); Phyllis Diller, as of December 26, 1969; and Ethel Merman (after having turned down the lead at the show's inception) from March 28, 1970, to December 27, 1970.

Two songs cut prior to the opening – typical belt style songs "World, Take Me Back" and "Love, Look in My Window" – were restored for Merman's run. Jo Anne Worley was Channing's original standby but she never went on. She later played Dolly in regional and summer stock productions. Bibi Osterwald was the standby for Dolly following Channing's and Worley's departures, subbing for all the stars, including Bailey, despite the fact that Osterwald was white. Marie Bryant and Novella Nelson also covered for the role of Dolly. Bailey received a Special Tony Award in 1968.

The show received rave reviews, with "praise for Carol Channing and particularly Gower Champion." The original production became the longest-running musical (and third longest-running show) in September 1970 in Broadway history up to that time, surpassing My Fair Lady and then being surpassed in turn by Fiddler on the Roof. The run was not continuous, unlike My Fair Lady, with several week-long breaks, including a week where the production moved to St. Louis. The Broadway production of Hello Dolly! grossed $27 million. By August 1970, it had made a profit of $8.5 million against its $350,000 investment.

Tour and regional Dollys

Mary Martin starred in a US tour, starting in April 1965 and playing in 11 cities. The production also toured in Japan, Korea and Vietnam for a special USO performance for U.S. troops.

After Channing left the Broadway show, she headed a second US tour beginning in September 1965. 18 months later, Rogers also joined the roadshow production. It ran for two years and nine months. Eve Arden and Dorothy Lamour were replacements. Grable led another touring company before joining the Broadway show.

Bailey and Calloway headed an all-Black tour in 1967 prior to their Broadway run, which was given a second cast album.

Carole Cook (the second actress to play the title role, after Channing, appearing in Australia and New Zealand productions), Dorothy Lamour, Eve Arden, Ann Miller, Michele Lee, Edie Adams, and Yvonne De Carlo also played the role on tour. Betty White appeared with the Kenley Players as Dolly in the summer of 1979. Molly Picon appeared as Dolly in a 1971 production by the North Shore Music Theatre of Beverly, Massachusetts. Lainie Kazan starred in a production at the Claridge Atlantic City. Vicki Lawrence played the role twice, once for Sacramento Music Circus and once for Glendale Music Theatre. Both Tovah Feldshuh and Betsy Palmer played Dolly in productions by the Paper Mill Playhouse. Marilyn Maye also starred in several regional productions and recorded a full album of the score.

=== Original Australian production ===
The Australian production was produced by J. C. Williamson Theatres Ltd. and opened at Her Majesty's Theatre, Sydney on 27 March 1965. Carole Cook was imported to star, making her the second woman to play the role of Dolly Levi. Jack Goode played Horace, alongside Bill Millican as Cornelius, Jill Perryman as Irene, Tikki Taylor as Minnie Fay, and Brian Hannan as Barnaby.

Australian choreographer Betty Pounder was employed to stage the musical numbers. Jill Perryman served as understudy to Carole Cook. Nancye Hayes was featured in the ensemble as well as understudying the part of Irene Molloy.

After a successful season in Sydney, the show went on to play Her Majesty's Theatre, Melbourne, and His Majesty's Theatre, Auckland in 1966.

==== Australian revivals ====
In 1995 a new Australian tour was presented by Gordon Frost. Jill Perryman, who starred as Irene Molloy in the 1965 production, starred as Dolly Levi. The production opened at the State Theatre, Melbourne, followed by Lyric Theatre, Brisbane, Her Majesty's Theatre, Sydney, Festival Theatre, Adelaide and His Majesty's Theatre, Perth.

The Production Company has staged Hello, Dolly! at the State Theatre, Melbourne twice: first in 2002, starring Amanda Muggleton, then again in 2017, starring Marina Prior.

=== Original London production ===
Hello, Dolly! premiered in the West End at the Theatre Royal Drury Lane on December 2, 1965, and ran for 794 performances. Champion directed and choreographed, and the cast starred Mary Martin as Dolly (after she, as well as Merman, had turned down the role for the original run of the show) and Loring Smith as Horace Vandergelder. Smith had created the Horace role in the original Broadway production of The Matchmaker, Johnny Beecher as Barnaby, Garrett Lewis as Cornelius, Mark Alden as Ambrose Kemper, and Marilynn Lovell as Irene Molloy. Dora Bryan replaced Martin from May 1966 until the show closed in October 1967.

=== Revivals ===
The show has been revived four times on Broadway:

- November 6, 1975 – December 28, 1975, Minskoff Theatre – Starring Pearl Bailey and Billy Daniels in an all-black production (42 performances)
- March 5, 1978 – July 9, 1978, Lunt-Fontanne Theatre – Starring Carol Channing and Eddie Bracken (147 performances)
- October 19, 1995 – January 28, 1996, Lunt-Fontanne Theatre – Starring Carol Channing and Jay Garner (116 performances)
- April 20, 2017 – August 25, 2018, Shubert Theatre – Starring Bette Midler and David Hyde Pierce (550 performances)

In the West End the show has been three times revived (to date, July 2024):

- 1979 – Carol Channing headlining at the Theatre Royal, Drury Lane and Shaftesbury Theatre, with Eddie Bracken as Horace and Angela Curran as Ermengarde.
- January 3, 1984 – April 27, 1984 – Danny La Rue headlining at the Prince of Wales Theatre, with Lionel Jeffries as Horace, Mark Haddigan as Barnaby, and Jeremy Hawk as Rudolph.

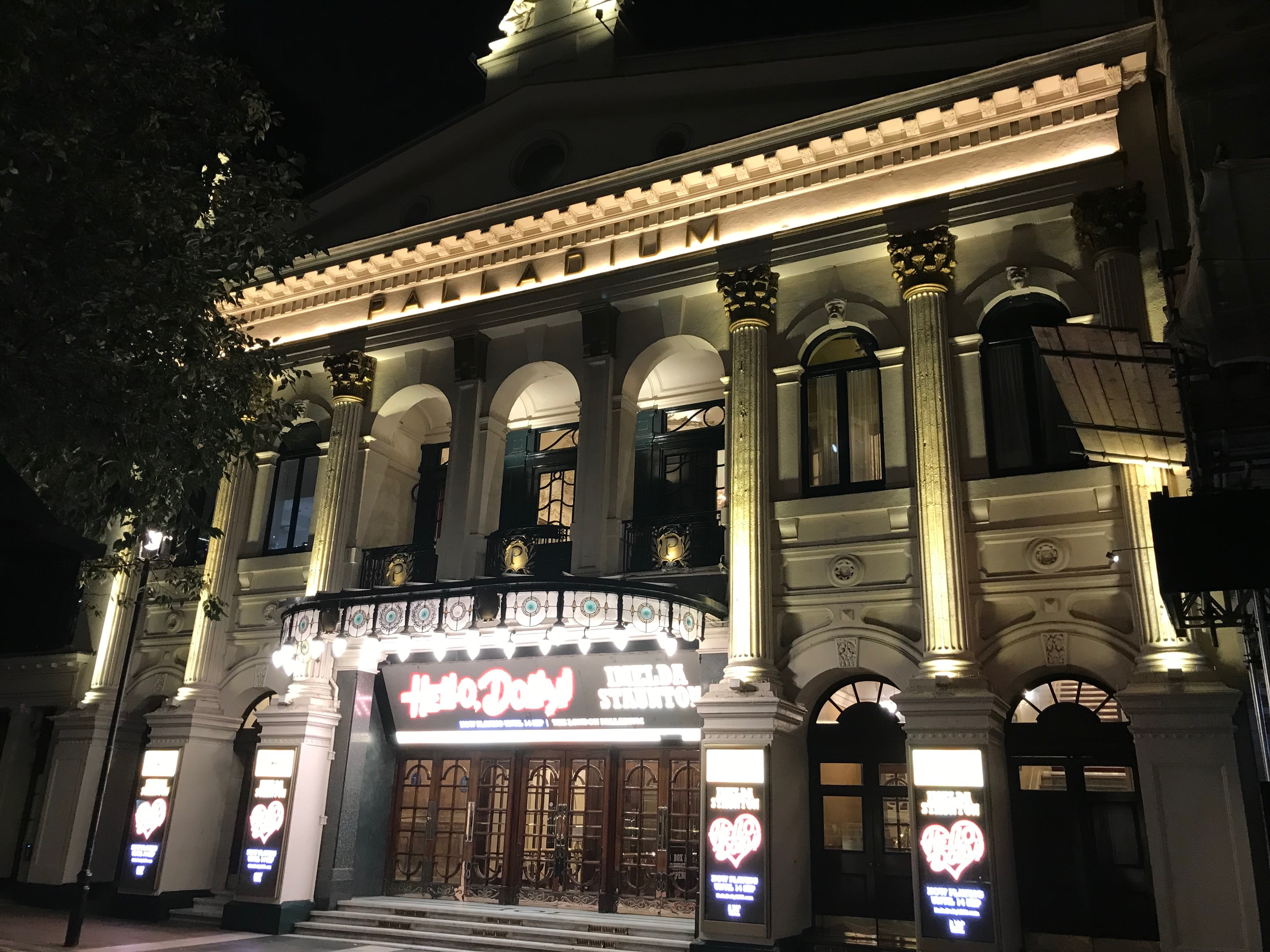
Musical "Hello, Dolly!" starring Imelda Staunton in the London Palladium, August 2024

- A third West End revival, headlined by Imelda Staunton under the direction of Dominic Cooke, played a limited ten-week season at the London Palladium from July 6 - September 14, 2024, with a July 18 press night. The production's cast included Andy Nyman (Horace), Jenna Russell (Irene), Harry Hepple (Cornelius) and Tyrone Huntley (Barnaby). This production had been scheduled to premiere on August 11, 2020 for a limited season at the Adelphi Theatre, its four-year postponement being due to the COVID-19 pandemic.

A 1989 UK tour of the show of Hello, Dolly!, directed and choreographed by Paul Kerryson, was headlined by Dora Bryan reprising her 1965-66 West End role. Bryan's castmates included Norman Rossington as Horace and Kathryn Evans as Irene. Kerryson would subsequently direct the 2014 Curve Theatre (Leicester) production of Hello, Dolly!, headlined by Janie Dee whose castmates included Laura Pitt-Pulford as Irene and Michael Xavier as Cornelius.

The 2009 Regent's Park Open Air Theatre revival of Hello, Dolly, headlined by Samantha Spiro under the direction of Timothy Sheader, ran July 30 – September 12, with other cast members including Allan Corduner (Horace), Josefina Gabrielle (Irene), and Akiya Henry (Minnie Fay). The production was honored with the Olivier Award as the best London-area stage musical revival of 2009, also earning Olivier awards for leading lady Samantha Spiro and for choreographer Stephen Mear.

=== 2017 Broadway revival/national tour ===
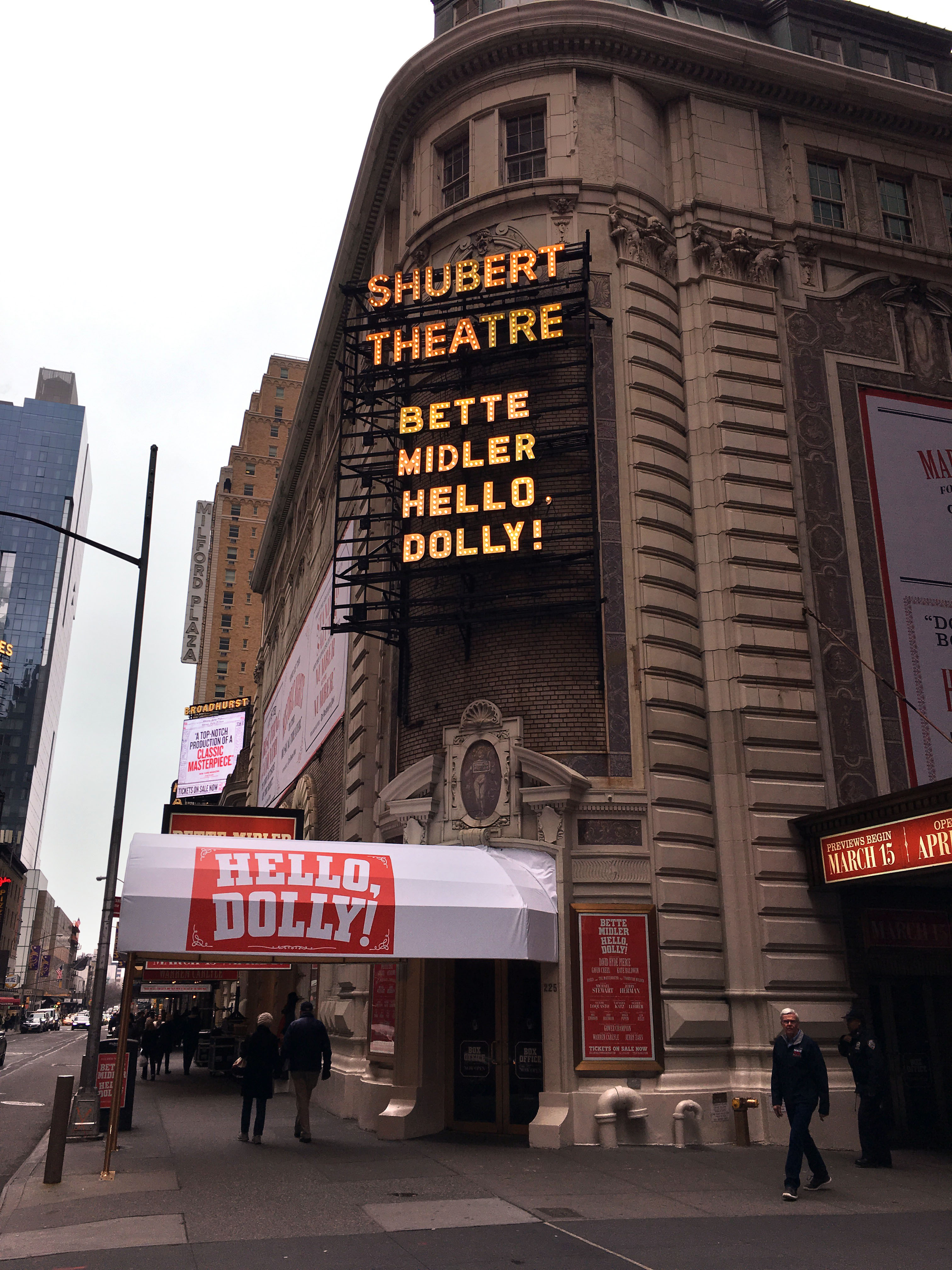
2017 Broadway revival at the Shubert Theatre.

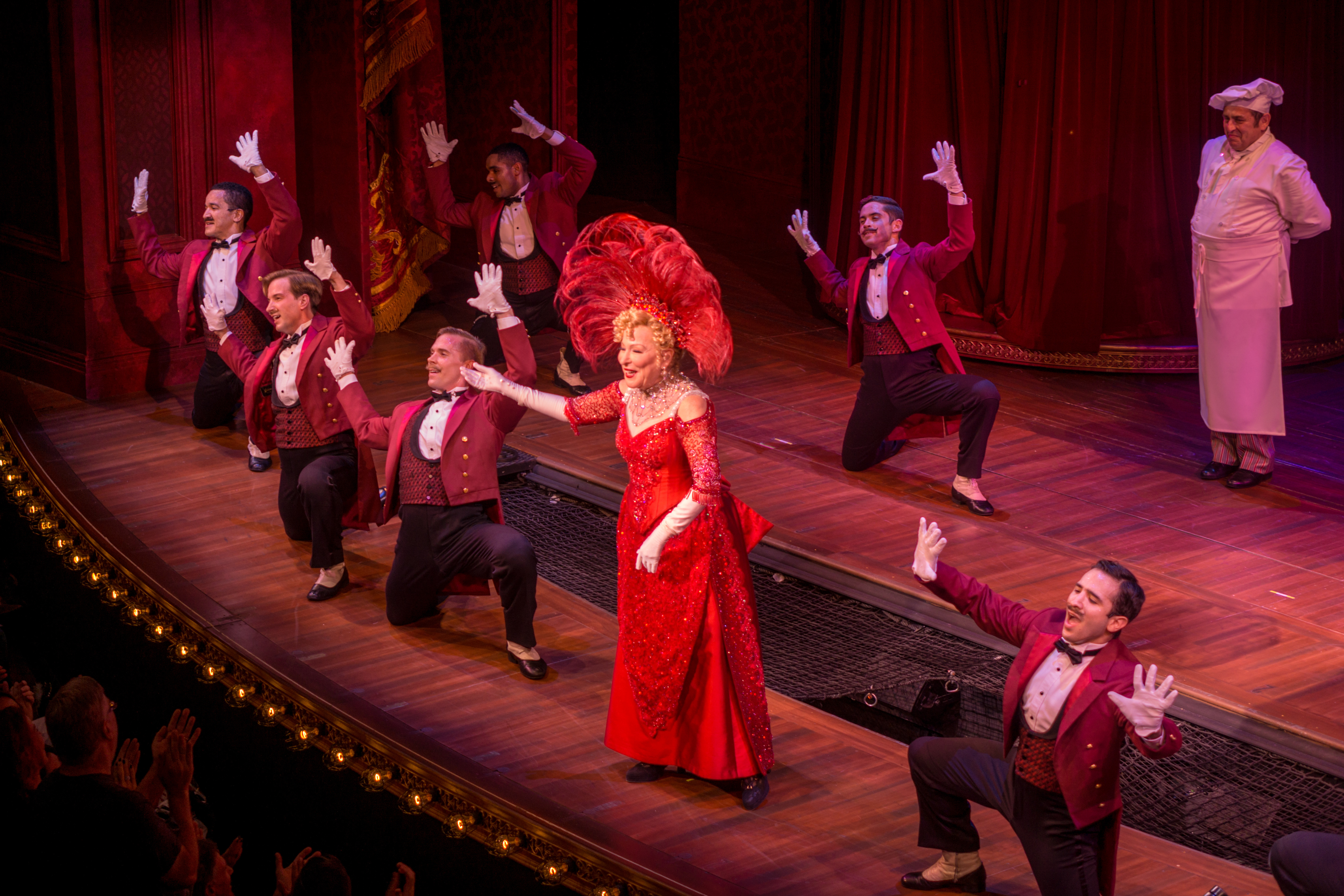
Bette Midler performing the title song on Broadway, 2017

On January 19, 2016, it was announced that Bette Midler would play the title role in a Broadway revival of Hello, Dolly!. Previews began March 15, 2017, officially opening on April 20, 2017, at the Shubert Theatre.

The production was produced by Scott Rudin, directed by Jerry Zaks and choreographed by Warren Carlyle. David Hyde Pierce played Horace Vandergelder. Other principal casting for this revival included Kate Baldwin as Irene Molloy, Gavin Creel as Cornelius Hackl, Jennifer Simard as Ernestina Money, Taylor Trensch as Barnaby Tucker, Will Burton as Ambrose Kemper, Melanie Moore as Ermengarde, and Beanie Feldstein as Minnie Fay. Donna Murphy played the role of Dolly at Tuesday evening performances beginning in June 2017, as well as covering Midler's holiday dates. She played her final performance on January 7, 2018. Midler won the Tony for Best Actress in a Leading Role in a Musical, and Creel for Best Actor in a Featured Role in a Musical, at the 71st Tony Awards in 2017.

Midler, Pierce, Trensch, and Feldstein left the production on January 14, 2018. Bernadette Peters took over the role of Dolly on January 20, 2018, and Victor Garber took over the role of Horace Vandergelder. Charlie Stemp assumed the role of Barnaby Tucker on January 20, 2018. Santino Fontana temporarily played the role of Cornelius Hackl from March 2018 to May 6 while Gavin Creel recovered from back surgery. Creel returned to the role on May 8, 2018. Before Fontana's temporary engagement, understudy Christian Dante White played the role of Cornelius. The production closed on August 25, 2018, with Midler and Hyde Pierce returning to play Dolly and Horace (respectively) from July 17, 2018, to closing.

Betty Buckley played the title role in the first national tour of the 2017 Broadway revival, which began performances in Cleveland, Ohio in October 2018 in the Connor Palace at Playhouse Square, after a tryout in Utica, New York in September 2018.

=== International productions ===
- The Israeli production in 1968–1970 starred Hanna Maron as Dolly Levi, one of the most famous actress on the Israel theater, on the "Alhambra" theater, produced by Giora Godik, also starring Shraga Friedman as Horace Vandergelder, Gadi Yagil as Cornelius Hackl and Tzipi Shavit as Minnie Fay. The musical was a huge success and Dolly remains one of Maron's lovable roles. The musical was translated to Hebrew by Haim Hefer, a well-known songwriter and poet.
- In 1967, the Argentine singer and actress Libertad Lamarque starred the first Spanish language version of the musical in the Teatro Manolo Fabregas of Mexico City. Lamarque also starred the musical in Argentina the same year.
- In 1985, Cuban diva Rosita Fornés played Dolly in a Cuban production of Hello, Dolly by the Teatro Karl Marx in Havana, Cuba. She also played the role in Camaguey City and in a television production under director Manolo Rifat.
- In 1989, Canadian theatre actress Nonnie Griffin played Dolly in a 10-month run of Hello Dolly in Toronto.
- In 1996, Mexican cinema star Silvia Pinal starred in a new version of the musical opposite Ignacio Lopez Tarso in the Teatro Silvia Pinal, in Mexico City.
- In 2018, the Mexican actress and singer Daniela Romo starred in a new Mexican version of the musical in the Teatro de los Insurgentes in Mexico City.
- In 2020, Lucía Galán (half of the Pimpinela singing duo) starred in the Argentinian version of the musical in the Teatro Opera in Buenos Aires.
- In 2024, Caroline O’Connor starred in a new English language production commemorating 60 years of Hello, Dolly! at Lido 2 Paris, directed and choreographed by Stephen Mear.

=== Tours ===
- From February 2008, Anita Dobson headlined a six month tour of Hello, Dolly! which played 19 British venues - including New Wimbledon Theatre in the London Borough of Merton (March 24-29) - also playing the Jersey Opera House in St Helier, Jersey (July 22-August 2). Dobson's castmates included Darren Day as Cornelius and Louise English as Irene. In 2006 Dobson had headlined the New Theatre Royal Lincoln production of Hello, Dolly! (November 16-December 2) which had co-starred Rolf Saxon as Horace.
- Sally Struthers appeared as Dolly in the 50th anniversary tour of the musical, which premiered in October 2013. Struthers had previously headlined the Ogunquit Playhouse 2006 production of Hello, Dolly! (July 25-August 5).
- A tour of the 2017 Broadway revival began touring the U.S. in September 2018 in Utica, New York starring Betty Buckley. The cast includes Lewis J. Stadlen as Horace Vandergelder, Nic Rouleau as Cornelius, Analisa Leaning as Irene Molloy, Jess LeProtto as Barnaby, Kristen Hahn as Minnie Fay, Garret Hawe as Ambrose Kemper, Morgan Kirner as Ermengarde, and Jessica Sheridan as Ernestina. Buckley ended her run in the tour on August 25, 2019; Carolee Carmello took over as Dolly on September 24, 2019, in Kansas City, Missouri. The other cast changes effective in September 2019 include John Bolton as Horace, with new cast playing Cornelius, Barnaby, Minnie Fay, and Ambrose.

== Critical reception ==
Opening night reviews of the original production were generally positive, and Carol Channing's performance as Dolly Gallagher Levi was greatly acclaimed; however, some reviewers criticized the score and the libretto, implying that Channing's performance was responsible for the efficacy of the show. In his review of the opening night performance, The New York Times theatre critic Howard Taubman wrote

Hello, Dolly! ... has qualities of freshness and imagination that are rare in the run of our machine-made musicals. It transmutes the broadly stylized mood of a mettlesome farce into the gusto and colors of the musical stage. ... Mr. Herman's songs are brisk and pointed and always tuneful ... a shrewdly mischievous performance by Carol Channing. ... Making the necessary reservations for the unnecessary vulgar and frenzied touches, one is glad to welcome Hello, Dolly! for its warmth, color and high spirits.

John Chapman of the New York Daily News lauded Carol Channing's performance, declaring her "the most outgoing woman on the musical stage today – big and warm, all eyes and smiles, in love with everybody in the theatre and possessing a unique voice ranging somewhat upward from a basso profundo." He also wrote, "I wouldn't say that Jerry Herman's score is memorable." New York Post critic Richard Watts, Jr., wrote,

The fact that [Hello, Dolly!] seems to me short on charm, warmth, and the intangible quality of distinction in no way alters my conviction that it will be an enormous popular success. Herman has composed a score that is always pleasant and agreeably tuneful, although the only number that comes to mind at the moment is the lively title song. His lyrics could be called serviceable.

In the New York Herald Tribune, Walter Kerr wrote,

Hello, Dolly! is a musical comedy dream, with Carol Channing the girl of it. ... Channing opens wide her big-as-millstone eyes, spreads her white-gloved arms in ecstatic abandon, trots out on a circular runway that surrounds the orchestra, and proceeds to dance rings around the conductor. ... With hair like orange sea foam, a contralto like a horse's neighing, and a confidential swagger, [she is] a musical comedy performer with all the blowzy glamor of the girls on the sheet music of 1916.

Kerr perceived deficiencies in the libretto, though, stating that the "lines are not always as funny as Miss Channing makes them". John McClain of the New York Journal American particularly praised the staging of the musical, saying that

Gower Champion deserves the big gong for performance beyond the call of duty. Seldom has a corps of dancers brought so much style and excitement to a production which could easily have been pedestrian. ... It is difficult to describe the emotion [the song "Hello, Dolly!"] produces. Last night the audience nearly tore up the seats as she led the parade of waiters in a series of encores over the semi-circular runway that extends around the orchestra pit out into the audience, ... a tribute to the personal appeal of Miss Channing and the magical inventiveness of Mr. Champion's staging.

== Awards and nominations ==
=== Original Broadway production ===
| Year | Award | Category | Nominee | Result |
|---|---|---|---|---|
| 1964 | New York Drama Critics' Circle Award | Best Musical | Jerry Herman and Michael Stewart | Won |
| 1964 | Tony Award | Best Musical | | Won |
| 1964 | Tony Award | Best Book of a Musical | Michael Stewart | Won |
| 1964 | Tony Award | Best Performance by a Leading Actress in a Musical | Carol Channing | Won |
| 1964 | Tony Award | Best Performance by a Featured Actor in a Musical | Charles Nelson Reilly | Nominated |
| 1964 | Tony Award | Best Original Score | Jerry Herman | Won |
| 1964 | Tony Award | Best Producer of a Musical | David Merrick | Won |
| 1964 | Tony Award | Best Direction of a Musical | Gower Champion | Won |
| 1964 | Tony Award | Best Choreography | Gower Champion | Won |
| 1964 | Tony Award | Best Conductor and Musical Director | Shepard Coleman | Won |
| 1964 | Tony Award | Best Scenic Design | Oliver Smith | Won |
| 1964 | Tony Award | Best Costume Design | Freddy Wittop | Won |
| 1968 | Special Tony Award | Special Award | Pearl Bailey | Won |
| 1970 | Drama Desk Award | Outstanding Performance | Ethel Merman | Won |

=== 1978 Broadway revival ===
| Year | Award | Category | Nominee | Result |
|---|---|---|---|---|
| 1978 | Tony Award | Best Performance by a Leading Actor in a Musical | Eddie Bracken | Nominated |

=== 1979 West End revival ===
| Year | Award | Category | Nominee | Result |
|---|---|---|---|---|
| 1979 | Olivier Award | Best Actress in a Musical | Carol Channing | Nominated |

=== 1995 Broadway revival ===
| Year | Award | Category | Nominee | Result |
|---|---|---|---|---|
| 1996 | Tony Award | Best Revival of a Musical | | Nominated |

=== 2009 Open Air Theatre revival ===
| Year | Award | Category | Nominee | Result |
|---|---|---|---|---|
| 2009 | Evening Standard Theatre Awards | Best Musical | | Won |
| 2010 | Laurence Olivier Award | Best Musical Revival | | Won |
| 2010 | Laurence Olivier Award | Best Actress in a Musical | Samantha Spiro | Won |
| 2010 | Laurence Olivier Award | Best Theatre Choreographer | Stephen Mear | Won |

=== 2017 Broadway revival ===
| Year | Award | Category | Nominee | Result |
|---|---|---|---|---|
| 2017 | Tony Award | Best Revival of a Musical | | Won |
| 2017 | Tony Award | Best Actor in a Leading Role in a Musical | David Hyde Pierce | Nominated |
| 2017 | Tony Award | Best Actress in a Leading Role in Musical | Bette Midler | Won |
| 2017 | Tony Award | Best Actor in a Featured Role in a Musical | Gavin Creel | Won |
| 2017 | Tony Award | Best Actress in a Featured Role in a Musical | Kate Baldwin | Nominated |
| 2017 | Tony Award | Best Direction of a Musical | Jerry Zaks | Nominated |
| 2017 | Tony Award | Best Scenic Design of a Musical | Santo Loquasto | Nominated |
| 2017 | Tony Award | Best Costume Design of a Musical | Santo Loquasto | Won |
| 2017 | Tony Award | Best Lighting Design of a Musical | Natasha Katz | Nominated |
| 2017 | Tony Award | Best Orchestrations | Larry Hochman | Nominated |
| 2017 | Drama Desk Award | Outstanding Revival of a Musical | | Won |
| 2017 | Drama Desk Award | Outstanding Actress in a Musical | Bette Midler | Won |
| 2017 | Drama Desk Award | Outstanding Featured Actor in a Musical | Gavin Creel | Won |
| 2017 | Drama Desk Award | Outstanding Featured Actress in a Musical | Kate Baldwin | Nominated |
| 2017 | Drama Desk Award | Outstanding Director of a Musical | Jerry Zaks | Nominated |
| 2017 | Drama Desk Award | Outstanding Choreographer | Warren Carlyle | Nominated |
| 2017 | Drama Desk Award | Outstanding Set Design | Santo Loquasto | Nominated |
| 2017 | Drama Desk Award | Outstanding Costume Design | Santo Loquasto | Nominated |
| 2017 | Drama Desk Award | Outstanding Sound Design | Scott Lehrer | Nominated |
| 2017 | Drama Desk Award | Outstanding Wig and Hair Design | Campbell Young Associates | Nominated |
| 2017 | Drama League Award | Outstanding Revival of a Broadway or Off-Broadway Musical | | Won |
| 2017 | Drama League Award | Distinguished Performance | David Hyde Pierce | Nominated |
| 2017 | Outer Critics Circle Award | Outstanding Revival of a Broadway Musical | | Won |
| 2017 | Outer Critics Circle Award | Outstanding Actor in a Musical | David Hyde Pierce | Nominated |
| 2017 | Outer Critics Circle Award | Outstanding Actress in a Musical | Bette Midler | Won |
| 2017 | Outer Critics Circle Award | Outstanding Featured Actor in a Musical | Gavin Creel | Won |
| 2017 | Outer Critics Circle Award | Outstanding Featured Actress in a Musical | Kate Baldwin | Nominated |
| 2017 | Outer Critics Circle Award | Outstanding Director of a Musical | Jerry Zaks | Nominated |
| 2017 | Outer Critics Circle Award | Outstanding Choreographer | Warren Carlyle | Won |
| 2017 | Outer Critics Circle Award | Outstanding Costume Design | Santo Loquasto | Nominated |
| 2017 | Outer Critics Circle Award | Outstanding Lighting Design | Natasha Katz | Nominated |
| 2017 | Outer Critics Circle Award | Outstanding Orchestrations | Larry Hochman | Won |
| 2017 | Chita Rivera Awards | Outstanding Ensemble in a Broadway Show | | Nominated |
| 2017 | Chita Rivera Awards | Outstanding Choreography in a Broadway Show | Warren Carlyle | Nominated |
| 2018 | Grammy Awards | Best Musical Theater Album | Bette Midler (principal soloist); Steven Epstein (producer) | Nominated |

=== 2024 West End revival ===
| Year | Award | Category | Nominee | Result |
|---|---|---|---|---|
| 2025 | Laurence Olivier Award | Best Musical Revival | | Nominated |
| 2025 | Laurence Olivier Award | Best Actress in a Musical | Imelda Staunton | Won |
| 2025 | Laurence Olivier Award | Best Actor in a Supporting Role | Andy Nyman | Nominated |

== Recordings ==
The RCA Victor cast recording of the original Broadway production was released in 1964. It was the number-one album on the Billboard pop albums chart for seven weeks, the top album of the year on the Year-End chart and won a Grammy Award for Best Musical Theater Album. In 1965, a recording of the original London production was released. In 1967, RCA Victor released a recording of the all-black Broadway replacement cast, featuring Pearl Bailey, who also starred in the unrecorded 1975 revival.

The movie soundtrack was released in 1969. On November 15, 1994, the 1994 revival cast recording was released.

The 2017 Broadway Revival cast recording was released on May 12, 2017, featuring the songs now sung by Bette Midler, David Hyde Pierce, Kate Baldwin, and Gavin Creel.

== Cultural influence ==
- Armstrong's 1964 recording of the song "Hello, Dolly!" rose to the top of the Billboard pop chart.
- The title song was sung in the 1999 film Dick by actor Dan Hedaya, playing President Richard Nixon.
- Following the thirtieth anniversary tour of the show, the Smithsonian accepted a donation from Channing and theatrical producer Manny Kladitis of the red satin, sequin-bedecked costume designed by Freddy Wittop. Worn by Channing during the climactic title song at the Harmonia Gardens, the red gown has been displayed at the National Museum of American History. The remainder of the original Wittop costumes are part of the Broadway Collection at Costume World, a theatrical museum located in Pompano Beach, Florida.
