= List of Pakistani films of 1992 =

List of Pakistani films by year 1992

This article contains a list films produced in Pakistan in the year 1992 and in the Urdu language:

== 1992 ==
Title	Director	Cast	Genre	Notes
Mr. 420	Umer Sharif	Umer Sharif, Madiha Shah, Roobi Niazi, Shakeela Qureshi, Khalid Zafar	Comedy	The film was released on June 12, 1992
Shehzada	Pervez Malik	Nadeem, Reema Khan, Babra Sharif	Drama	
Pabandi		Kaveeta, Nadeem, Samina		
Pamila		Neeli, Javed Sheikh		
Aur Choorian Toot Gein		Shakeel Khan, Sapna, Nawaz, Shaista		
Raaz		Babra, Mohsin, Moin Akhtar		
Jeena Chahti Hun		Madiha Shah, Ismael Shah		
Aaj Ka Dour		Rubi, Arshad Mehmood		
Zindgi		Shahida Minni, Sultan Rahi		
Godfather		Nadra, Sultan Rahi		
Haseeno Ki Barat		Anjuman, Sultan Rahi, Javed		
Abdullah The Great	Hassan Askari	Neeli, Nadeem, Saima, Izhar Qazi, Sonia, Albela, Rangeela	Action	The film was released on April 5, 1992
Naila	Hasnain	Madiha Shah, Shaan, Abid Ali, Tariq Shah	Music	The film was released on January 31, 1992
Chahat	Hasnain	Nadeem, Mustafa Qureshi, Reema Khan	Music, Romance	The film was released on July 24, 1992
Mehbooba	Hasnain	Nadeem, Reema Khan, Anjuman, Nadira	Drama	

== See also ==
- 1992 in Pakistan
