= Shahlar Huseynov =

Armenian soldier

- Born: November 26, 1968; Hankavan village, Armenia SSR
- Died: April 10, 1992 (aged 23); Tartar District, Azerbaijan
- Military career
- Allegiance: Republic of Azerbaijan
- Conflicts: First Nagorno-Karabakh War
- Awards: National Hero of Azerbaijan; 1992

Shahlar Isa oglu Huseynov (Azerbaijani: Şahlar Hüseynov; 26 November 1968, in Hankavan village, Armenia SSR – 10 April 1992, in Tartar District, Azerbaijan) was the National Hero of Azerbaijan, and soldier during the First Nagorno-Karabakh War in the early 1990s.

== Early life and education ==
Huseynov was born on 26 November 1968 in Hankavan village of Armenia SSR. In 1985, he completed his secondary education at Hankavan village secondary school. From 1986 through 1988, Huseynov served in the Soviet Armed Forces.

=== Personal life ===
He was single.

== First Nagorno-Karabakh War ==
When Khojaly was captured by ethnic Armenian forces on 26 February 1992 during the First Nagorno-Karabakh War, Huseynov voluntarily joined The Ganja Battalion and went to the front-line. Since Huseynov was able to speak Armenian language fluently, he was always sent to the intelligence operations to collect information about military plans. On April 10, 1992, the attack of the Armenian soldiers to Shikharkh village was prevented, and Huseynov was killed in that battle.

== Honors ==
Shahlar Isa oglu Huseynov was posthumously awarded the title of the "National Hero of Azerbaijan" by Presidential Decree No. 833 dated 7 June 1992.

He was buried at a Martyrs' Lane cemetery in Ganja, Azerbaijan. A street in Ganja was named after him.

== See also ==
- First Nagorno-Karabakh War
- National Hero of Azerbaijan
- Ganja Battalion

== Sources ==
- Vugar Asgarov. Azərbaycanın Milli Qəhrəmanları (Yenidən işlənmiş II nəşr). Bakı: "Dərələyəz-M", 2010, səh. 127.
