= Seymour Mamedov =

National Hero of Azerbaijan

- Born: September 18, 1971; Füzuli, Azerbaijan SSR
- Died: April 1, 1992 (aged 20); Melikcanlı, Khojavend District, Azerbaijan
- Military career
- Allegiance: Republic of Azerbaijan
- Conflicts: First Nagorno-Karabakh War
- Awards: National Hero of Azerbaijan; 1992

Seymour Gahraman oglu Mamedov (Azerbaijani: Seymur Məmmədov) (18 September 1971, Füzuli, Azerbaijan SSR - 1 April 1992, Melikcanlı, Khojavend District, Azerbaijan) was the National Hero of Azerbaijan and warrior during the First Nagorno-Karabakh War.

== Early life and education ==
Mamedov was born on September 18, 1971, in Füzuli raion of Azerbaijan SSR. In 1988, he completed his secondary education at the Secondary School No 2. In 1988, he entered Azerbaijan Technical University. In 1991, he was drafted to the military service. He served in Germany and Ukraine.

=== Personal life ===
Mamedov was single.

== First Nagorno-Karabakh War ==
Seymour Mamedov voluntarily joined the self-defense battalion as he was discharged from the army. He participated in releasing several villages, taking back hostages from Armenian Armed Forces. On April 1, 1992, he was killed in a heavy battle around the village of Melikcanlı.

== Honors ==
Seymour Gahraman oglu Mamedov was posthumously awarded the title of the "National Hero of Azerbaijan" by Presidential Decree No. 131 dated 11 August 1992.

He was buried at a Martyrs' Lane cemetery in Baku. A school where he studied was named after him.

== See also ==
- First Nagorno-Karabakh War
- List of National Heroes of Azerbaijan

== Sources ==
- Vugar Asgarov. Azərbaycanın Milli Qəhrəmanları (Yenidən işlənmiş II nəşr). Bakı: "Dərələyəz-M", 2010, səh. 206.
