= Boys from the Bush =

- Genre: Comedy drama
- Created by: Douglas Livingstone
- Written by: Douglas Livingstone
- Directed by: Shirley Barrett & Robert Marchand
- Starring: Tim Healy; Chris Haywood; Mark Haddigan; Nadine Garner; Pat Thomson; Kirsty Child; Kris McQuade; Rob Steele; Noah Taylor
- Theme music composer: Brian Lang
- Country of origin: United Kingdom
- Original language: English
- No. of series: 2
- No. of episodes: 20

Production
- Executive producer: Peter Beilby
- Producer: Verity Lambert
- Cinematography: Martin McGrath
- Running time: 50 mins

Original release
- Network: BBC1
- Release: 25 January 1991 – 14 July 1992

Boys from the Bush is a British television series produced by the BBC. It was created and written by Douglas Livingstone. Two series, each of ten 50-minute episodes, were made between 25 January 1991 and 14 July 1992. Although never achieving mainstream success, the series has since gathered a dedicated cult following.

== Plot ==
The series deals with the life of Reg Toomer (Tim Healy), an Englishman from Shepherd's Bush living in Australia and running Melbourne Confidential, a failing private detective agency with his shifty business partner Dennis Tontine (Chris Haywood). His estranged young cousin Leslie (Mark Haddigan), also from Shepherd's Bush, hence one sense of the punning title, arrives in Melbourne from the UK after a painful divorce. He has been promised fun and excitement in the new world, instead finds himself used as a drudge for Melbourne Confidential.

Each episode focuses on a particular job undertaken by Melbourne Confidential, each one more elaborate and of more dubious legality than the last. Subplots involve Reg's lovelorn wife Doris (Pat Thomson), assertive daughter Arlene (Nadine Garner), Dennis' ex-wife Corrie (Kirsty Child) and kindly madam Delilah (Kris McQuade).

Produced by Verity Productions and Seven Network, the first series (only) was screened in Australia in late 1993.

== Cast ==
=== Main / regular ===
- Tim Healy as Reg Toomer
- Chris Haywood as Dennis Tontine
- Mark Haddigan as Leslie
- Pat Thomson as Doris Toomer
- Nadine Garner as Arlene Toomer
- Kirsty Child as Corrie
- Kris McQuade as Delilah

=== Guests ===
- Alison Whyte as Eva (1 episode)
- Anna Volska as Joan (1 episode)
- Anne Phelan as Betty (1 episode)
- Arna-Maria Winchester as Gloria Goodson (1 episode)
- Bert Newton as Talk Show Host (1 episode)
- Bruce Barry as Basil (1 episode)
- Bud Tingwell as Graham (1 episode)
- Cliff Ellen as Toddy (1 episode)
- Dennis Miller as Gabby (1 episode)
- Frank Gallacher as Gavin (1 episode)
- Frank Lloyd as Ralph (1 episode)
- Frankie J. Holden as Danno (1 episode)
- Gerard Kennedy as Jokey Jones (1 episode)
- Gerda Nicolson as Betty (1 episode)
- Gia Carides as Maria (2 episodes)
- Greg Evans as Compère (1 episode)
- Greg Stone as Sydney (1 episode)
- Heather Mitchell as Joyce (1 episode)
- James Condon as John (1 episode)
- Jeremy Kewley as Frank Morris (2 episodes)
- Jo Kennedy as Melissa (3 episodes)
- John Ewart (1 episode)
- John Frawley as Alec (1 episode)
- John Orcsik as Vangelis (1 episode)
- Judi Farr as Phyllis (1 episode)
- June Salter as Sarah (1 episode)
- Khym Lam as Malee (1 episode)
- Leila Hayes as Daphne (1 episode)
- Max Cullen as Ted (1 episode)
- Mike Bishop as Bruce (1 episode)
- Monica Maughan as Alice (1 episode)
- Neil Melville as Ted (2 episodes)
- Noah Taylor as Vince (1 episode)
- Pat Bishop as Grace (1 episode)
- Peter Fisher as Greg (1 episode)
- Peter Hosking as Rick (1 episode)
- Reg Evans as Stewie (1 episode)
- Reg Gorman as Carl (1 episode)
- Ritchie Singer as Carlo (1 episode)
- Roger Ward as Rocko (1 episode)
- Steve Bisley as Bill (1 episode)
- Sue Jones as Daphne (1 episode)
- Terry Gill as Jacko (2 episodes)
- Tim Robertson as Bobby (1 episode)
- Tiriel Mora as Mel (1 episode)
- Tommy Dysart as Nick (1 episode)
- Tony Rickards as Brian (1 episode)
- Tracy Mann as Lucinda (1 episode)
- Wynn Roberts as Harry (1 episode)

== The author ==
Douglas Livingstone (1934–2021) also wrote the screenplay for The Day of the Triffids (1981), the BBC adaptation of the John Wyndham novel, and wrote or co-wrote screenplays for several in the BBC 1985–1998 series Screen Two: Run for the Lifeboat, The Impossible Spy, and Return to Blood River. He adapted several short stories ("Maigret Sets a Trap", "Maigret and the Night Club Dancer", and "Maigret and the Maid") by Georges Simenon for the 12-episode 1992 BBC series Maigret starring Michael Gambon. He wrote the 1996 TV comedy Heavy Weather for the BBC and WGBH-TV, Boston, based on the P. G. Wodehouse novel. He wrote the original six-episode drama series The Cazalets (2001) for BBC-TV, and three full-length comedies in the series The Quest (2002–2004) for Yorkshire Television.
