= Bob Allen (Australian footballer) =

Australian rules footballer (1908–1992)

Personal information
- Full name: Robert Allen
- Born: 22 December 1908
- Died: 8 April 1992 (aged 83)

Playing career^{1}
Years	Club	Games (Goals)
1926	Fitzroy	2 (1)
- ^{1} Playing statistics correct to the end of 1926.

Robert Allen (22 December 1908 – 8 April 1992) was an Australian rules footballer who played with Fitzroy in the Victorian Football League (VFL).
