= Aghvorik =

Village in Shirak, Armenia

Aghvorik Աղվորիկ
- Location within Armenia Location within Shirak
- Coordinates: 41°04′33″N 43°45′18″E
- Country: Armenia
- Province: Shirak
- Municipality: Amasia
- Elevation: 2,050 m (6,730 ft)

Population (2011)
  - Total: 89
- Time zone: UTC+4
  - Summer (DST): UTC+5
- Climate: Dfb

Aghvorik (Armenian: Աղվորիկ) is a village in the Amasia Municipality of the Shirak Province of Armenia.

== History ==
Some of the ancestors of the village population emigrated from Western Armenia in 1828–1830. The village was mostly populated by Azerbaijanis. In 1988-1989, during the Nagorno-Karabakh conflict, local Azeris moved to Azerbaijan, and Armenian families resettled in the village.

== Demographics ==
Historical population
Year	Pop.	±% p.a.
1896	285	—
1897	406	+42.46%
1926	457	+0.41%
1939	595	+2.05%
1959	703	+0.84%
1970	1,072	+3.91%
1979	1,091	+0.20%
1989	45	−27.30%
2001	90	+5.95%
2011	89	−0.11%
2013	142	+26.31%
