= Mark Haddigan =

British actor

Mark Haddigan is an actor based in England.

He is known for playing the part of Les in the 1991 BBC sitcom Boys from the Bush as well as PC Timothy Able in the long-running ITV drama The Bill, and has guest starred in Shameless. His only film role was in 101 Dalmatians. As of 2000, Haddigan owned a hotel called Northover Manor in Ilchester, Somerset.
