= Too Chee Chew =

Yang Berbahagia Tan Sri Dr. Too Chee Chew MBE JMN PSM
- C. C. Too was awarded the Panglima Setia Mahkota, which carries the title of Tan Sri, in 1986 for his work in psychological warfare.
- Born: 31 March 1920
- Died: 19 April 1992 (aged 72)
- Military career
- Allegiance: Malaysia
- Service years: 1951–1983
- Rank: Head of the Psychological Warfare Section
- Nickname: C. C. Too
- Awards: Member of the Order of the British Empire; Panglima Setia Mahkota

Too Chee Chew

Chinese name
- Traditional Chinese: 杜志超
- Simplified Chinese: 杜志超
- Hanyu Pinyin: Dù Zhìchāo
- Jyutping: Dou6 Zi3 Ciu1
- Hokkien POJ: Tō͘ Chì-chhiau
- Tâi-lô: Tōo Tsì-tshiau

Too Chee Chew (杜志超 M.B.E. (31 March 1920 – 19 April 1992), better known as C. C. Too, was a major exponent of psychological warfare in Malaysia.

Too was the first local to head the Psychological Warfare Section, from 1956 till his retirement in 1983. Too was responsible for crafting British and Malayan policy during negotiations with Malayan Communist Party (MCP) leaders and encouraging the support of controversial government policies such as the Briggs Plan during the Malayan Emergency.

== Early life ==
Too was born in Kuala Lumpur to Too Choo Sun. The elder Too's father, Too Nam, was involved in the Chinese revolutionary movement, and had tutored Sun Yat Sen.

Too's early education was mainly in the Chinese stream, but he later attended Methodist Boys School in Kuala Lumpur. In 1938, he was the top candidate in Kuala Lumpur for the Cambridge School Certificate Examination, scoring six A1s and two B2s. He then attended a science course at the Victoria Institution, before being awarded the Federated Malay States scholarship to Raffles College in Singapore. Too attended Raffles College from 1939 to 1941, when he was elected President of the student body. That same year, the Japanese began their invasion of Southeast Asia, disrupting Too's studies. He never completed his course at Raffles College, but was awarded a war diploma in science (equivalent to a BSc) after the end of the Second World War, in 1947.

In the course of his studies, Too befriended Eu Chooi Yip (余柱业). They parted ways after the Japanese invasion, and Too did not hear of Eu again until he participated in the planning of Operation Coldstore, when it emerged that Eu had joined the communists.

During the war, Too spent his time at the Kuala Lumpur book club, where he read all the books available. He also took up photography; his father had given him a new camera in 1945, just before the end of the war, apparently anticipating that the Japanese currency in use at the time would soon be worthless. It was also during the war and its aftermath that the communists attempted to persuade Too to join them. Several leaders of the Malayan People's Anti-Japanese Army (MPAJA) – an organisation which would later form the bulk of the communist forces – were introduced to Too, who was even invited to join the MPAJA when they flew to London for the victory parade. Too, anticipating that this would result in his being branded as a communist, declined. Despite this, they pressed on, even introducing Too to Chin Peng, later the Secretary-General of the Malayan Communist Party.

== Post-war work ==
After the war, Too acted as a liaison between the communist leaders of the MPAJA and some American officers of the OSS – it was these officers who gave Too the name "C. C. Too", which would stick with him for the rest of his life. It was in this role that Too had his first encounter with psychological warfare, when he successfully encouraged a minor communist leader to defect.

In April 1946, Too began work as a secretary to the Consulate of the Republic of China. He was later promoted to secretary to the Consul General. Too's employment at the consulate ended when Britain recognised the People's Republic of China instead in 1950.

== The early Emergency ==
In early 1951, Too joined the Emergency Information Service (EIS) as a research assistant. He was soon promoted to Chinese Assistant to the Head of the EIS, where he became frustrated by a lack of documents for analysis. Purporting to be doing so in the name of the Head of the EIS, he issued a directive requiring every scrap of paper recovered from enemy communist combatants in the ongoing Malayan Emergency be forwarded to headquarters.

Around 1952, it was the opinion of the EIS that the communists were on the verge of giving up their insurgency. However, Too's analysis of the situation indicated that the communists were only narrowing the focus and scope of their activities in certain areas, while actually expanding them in others. Too relied on certain documents classified as "Top Secret" – a classification that would typically limit access only to expatriate British officers – that he had been shown by the head of the EIS, who then endorsed Too's report.

That same year, a new Director General of Information, A. D. C. ("Alec") Peterson, was appointed by Gerald Templar. Peterson was seen by Too as being less co-operative with locals, and Too resigned in "utter disgust" in 1953 at his perceived interference with his work. Too, who had been involved in the authoring and distribution of propaganda leaflets, went as far as to complain to a General that the interference of the British was as if a civilian had been deploying the army's soldiers. In Too's view, the British were unacquainted with the realities on the ground of preparing propaganda, a view he believed found validation after Peterson left Malaya in 1955. An alternative view of Peterson's role, and relationship with Too, can be found in other studies of the period, such as Kumar Ramakrishna's: Emergency Propaganda: The Winning of Malayan Hearts and Minds, 1948–1958 (Richmond, Surrey: Curzon, 2002). Before leaving, Peterson warned the new Head of the Psychological Warfare Section, O. W. Wolters, about Too, whose "Tooism" was in Peterson's view more threatening than communism. Nevertheless, Wolters soon made contact with Too, and invited him to rejoin the government in 1955. Too would serve in the Psychological Warfare Section on a contract to be renewed every two years. A caveat of this was that because he was not considered a "permanent" public servant, Too would be ineligible for a pension. The following year, Too replaced Wolters, becoming the first Malayan Head of the Psychological Warfare Section.

As part of his work in the Psychological Warfare Section, Too crafted a campaign to turn public opinion against the communists. The communists mainly drew on support from Malaysian Chinese, who in Too's view would not be swayed by traditional government appeals along the lines of "Look chaps: The government is going to collapse and the communists are going to win." Too argued that the Chinese would think: "Fine. Thanks for the information. We will go to the winning side." Instead, Too's proposal was to tell the Chinese that "These communists are very bad. They come and rob you of your money, of this, of that. You don't like it, surely?" To win support for the controversial Briggs Plan, which relocated the dispersed Chinese villagers to fenced and guarded "New Villages", Too presented the New Villages as a way to give Chinese villagers an excuse to refuse aid to the communists. When communists asked for supplies, Chinese villagers could express support for the communists but insist they could not smuggle supplies out because of the guards.

Too also adopted the communist tactic of sending "eyes and ears" to monitor the opinions of villagers, giving him a direct and unfiltered view of public opinion. Too's propaganda strategy emphasised the common man, rather than the insurgents; he believed it was more important to gain the support of the public than to convince the communist guerillas to defect. Nevertheless, he was heavily involved in developing the leaflets used to convince communist defections. Amongst Too's innovations was the usage of inconspicuously coloured instead of brightly coloured paper for leaflets, so that the communist rank-and-file would not be noticed by their superiors when they picked up the leaflets. Too avoided a "preachy" approach in drafting the leaflets; his style was described as: "Don't preach. Don't theorize. Never say 'I told you so.' No propaganda based on hatred." Too also focused on a factual approach in his propaganda leaflets, which often comprised information such as the names of recently surrendered communist soldiers, lists of mistresses of party leaders (a privilege resented by many rank and file), and photos of communist casualties.

== Baling peace talks ==
In 1955, the Malayan Communist Party (MCP) called for peace talks with the government of the autonomous Federation of Malaya, led by Tunku Abdul Rahman. The prevailing view in British intelligence was that this was a sign that the communists were nearly defeated, and on the verge of giving up. Too disagreed, insisting that certain documents had been mistranslated by the British, while others had been ignored. He predicted that if the preliminary overtures of the MCP found public acceptance, the MCP would go further and start dictating terms, such as insisting that the British be excluded from the negotiations. This later proved to be correct.

It was later agreed that the Tunku and other senior government officials would meet with Chin Peng and a few other elite leaders of the MCP in the town of Baling, Kedah. To prepare for the talks, the British held a private "dress rehearsal" to anticipate what moves Chin Peng might make; Too played the part of Chin Peng. Too correctly predicted that Chin Peng would use the negotiations as a means to communicate with the general Malayan populace. Instead of speaking to the Tunku, he would choose his words to appeal to the Malayan people and humiliate the government of the Federation – his remarks throughout the negotiations would be released in full to the press. Too's predictions were conveyed to the Tunku, who was thus able to neutralise the effect of Chin Peng's actions during the talks.

As a result of his successful efforts at psychological warfare, Too was promoted to Head of the Psychological Warfare Section, a post he would hold until his retirement in 1983. In January 1957, Sir Donald MacGillivray, the outgoing British High Commissioner, awarded Too his medal as an Honorary Member of the Order of the British Empire. On 31 August 1957, the date of Malaya's independence, Too was among the first recipients of the Johan Mangku Negara (Champion of the Defence of the Realm) by the first Yang di-Pertuan Agong. The Emergency was officially declared as over in 1960.

== The Singapore mission ==
In 1962, Malaya was preparing to merge with the British colonies of Singapore, Sabah, and Sarawak to form Malaysia. Singapore was a hotbed of communist radicals at the time, with communists dominating the rank and file of the governing People's Action Party (PAP) as well as the opposition Socialist Front. The communists strongly opposed the merger, because they would be unable to manipulate a Malaysian government based in Kuala Lumpur and led by the anti-communist Barisan Nasional (National Front). To gain the appearance of public support, the PAP announced a non-binding referendum on merger to be held on 1 September 1962.

The head of the Singaporean government, Lee Kuan Yew, asked for assistance from the Tunku in carrying out a propaganda campaign to win support for merger. The Tunku acquiesced, sending Too on a secret mission to Singapore, where he would advise Lee. Too's analysis of the situation suggested that support for the PAP was waning because the communist-infiltrated campaign personnel of the PAP made promises to voters that the government could not keep. Too also blamed "Lee's personal arrogance" for worsening affairs.

Too suggested that the PAP cast the referendum as a choice between a communist government and a PAP government of Singapore as a state in Malaysia, painting the choice of communism as one of disaster. He also favoured gaining the support of the Chinese majority of the electorate through persuasion of leaders of the Chinese Chamber of Commerce to support merger. Eventually, the referendum succeeded, with over 70% of the votes cast supporting merger.

While in Singapore, Too was also influential in affecting the timing of Operation Coldstore. The Malayan, Singaporean and British governments all favoured a massive crackdown on the communist leadership in Singapore. However, the Singaporeans and British wanted the crackdown to occur after merger had been effected, so they could claim it had been the doing of the federal government in Kuala Lumpur. However, Too noted that the governments of Indonesia and the Philippines were both opposing merger, citing as one ground the ostensibly "Malay Government" of Malaya, which led to fears that the federal government might oppress the non-Malay minorities in Malaysia. (See ketuanan Melayu.) Operation Coldstore, if carried out after merger, would thus create a propaganda victory for the Indonesians and Filipinos. Too expressed his views to both Tun Abdul Razak, the Deputy Prime Minister of Malaya, and the Tunku himself. Both men agreed, and as a result Operation Coldstore took place in February 1963, seven months before the formation of Malaysia.

== Later work ==
=== National Operations Council ===
In 1963, as a result of Malaysia's formation, Indonesia announced a policy of "confrontation" with Malaysia. At this time, Too took the initiative of proposing a National Operations Council (NOC) modelled on the National Emergency Council that had been in place during the Emergency. The NOC could consist of senior members of the Cabinet, and the chiefs of the Armed Forces and the Police. Too, as Head of Psychological Warfare, was also included. The NOC would play an influential role in the governing of the country after the May 13 Incident in 1969, when the constitutional government was suspended. When Parliament was restored in 1971, the NOC was dissolved.

=== Second Emergency ===
The communists launched a second insurrection in 1968. This second emergency ended in 1978, when the remaining MCP insurgents fled to Thailand. However, the communists continued to press for negotiations, proposing a "Democratic Coalition Government" with the Malaysian government. Too cautioned the government against paying this offer any heed, as the communists had nothing to bargain with.

=== Foreign service ===
In 1962, Too acted as a consultant to the United States military, lecturing on Psychological Warfare and Counter-Insurgency" at the US Army Command and General Staff College, Ft. Leavenworth, Kansas, and advising the US during the Vietnam War. He also was involved with South Korea.

== Retirement ==
Too retired from the Psychological Warfare Section in 1983. In 1986, he was awarded the Panglima Setia Mahkota (Knight Commander of the Order of the Crown) by the Yang di-Pertuan Agong, an award entitling Too to the title of Tan Sri. Too was critical of the government's monitoring of communist propaganda broadcasts after his retirement, at one point spending the whole night listening to communist broadcasts to prove his point. He was also an opponent of the government's peace accord with the MCP inked in 1989. In his view, the communists had become a negligible force without any bargaining power, and as such the government had nothing to gain from the treaty. Too died in 1992.

== Honours ==
- Malaya
  - Companion of the Order of the Defender of the Realm (JMN) (1958)
- Malaysia
  - Commander of the Order of Loyalty to the Crown of Malaysia (PSM) – Tan Sri (1986)

=== Commonwealth Honours ===
- United Kingdom
  - Honorary Member of the Order of British Empire (MBE) (1957)
