= Lance Dobson =

Australian rules footballer

Personal information
- Full name: Lance Dobson
- Born: 26 February 1921
- Died: 13 April 1992 (aged 71)
- Original team: Port Melbourne
- Height: 173 cm (5 ft 8 in)
- Weight: 78 kg (172 lb)

Playing career^{1}
Years	Club	Games (Goals)
1943–44	North Melbourne	21 (6)
- ^{1} Playing statistics correct to the end of 1944.

Lance Dobson (26 February 1921 – 13 April 1992) was an Australian rules footballer who played with North Melbourne in the Victorian Football League (VFL).
