= Ganja Battalion =

Gəncə yarım könüllü batalyonu
- Active: 1992-Present
- Country: Azerbaijan
- Allegiance: Armed Forces of Azerbaijan
- Branch: Azerbaijani Land Forces
- Type: Infantry
- Size: 200 over the course of the war
- Engagements: First Nagorno-Karabakh War

Commanders
- Commander: Mehman Alakbarov

The Ganja Volunteer Battalion (Azerbaijani: Gəncə yarım könüllü batalyonu) was a battalion of volunteers made up of active and reserve Azerbaijani military personnel sent to the Nagorno-Karabakh region as part of the Armed Forces of Azerbaijan force fighting in the first Nagorno-Karabakh War. It was financed by Surat Huseynov.

== See also ==
- Military history of Azerbaijan
