= Məlikcanlı =

Malikjanly / Melikashen Məlikcanlı / Մելիքաշեն
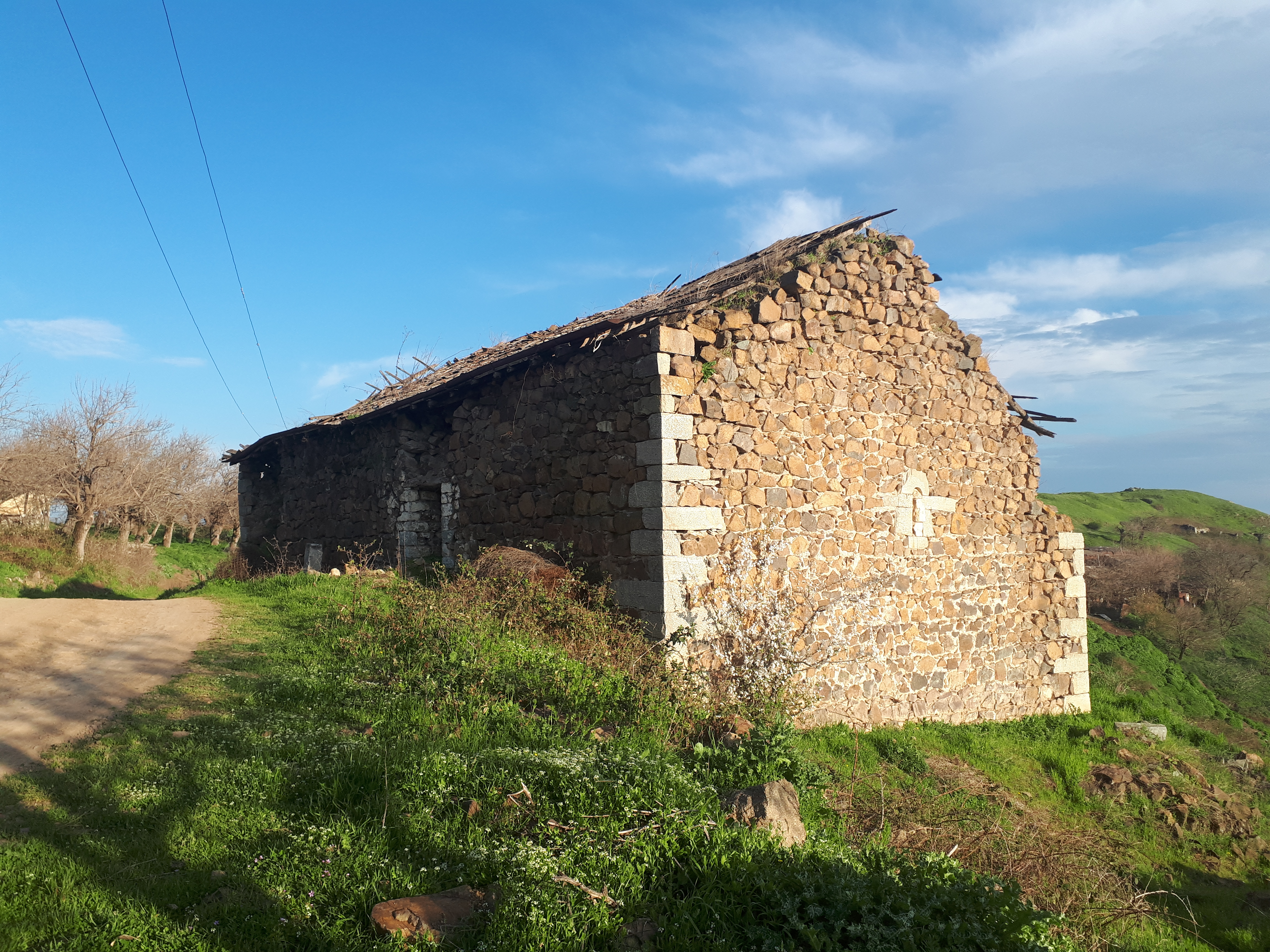
- The Holy Resurrection Church from 1889

- Location within Azerbaijan
- Coordinates: 39°31′35″N 47°04′47″E
- Country: Azerbaijan
- District: Khojavend

Population (2015)
  - Total: 11
- Time zone: UTC+4 (AZT)

Malikjanly (Azerbaijani: Məlikcanlı) or Melikashen (Armenian: Մելիքաշեն) is a village in the Khojavend District of Azerbaijan, in the region of Nagorno-Karabakh.

== History ==
During the Soviet period, the village was part of the Hadrut District of the Nagorno-Karabakh Autonomous Oblast. After the First Nagorno-Karabakh War, the village was administrated as part of the Hadrut Province of the breakaway Republic of Artsakh. The village came under the control of Azerbaijan on 14 October 2020, during the 2020 Nagorno-Karabakh war under the cease fire agreement.

== Historical heritage sites ==
Historical heritage sites in and around the village include an 18th/19th-century cemetery, and the Holy Resurrection Church (Armenian: Սուրբ Հարություն եկեղեցի, romanized: Surb Harutyun Yekeghetsi) built in 1889.

== Demographics ==
The village had an ethnic Armenian-majority population in 1989. Prior to the 2020 Nagorno-Karabakh war, it also had an Armenian majority with 14 inhabitants in 2005, and 11 inhabitants in 2015.

== Gallery ==
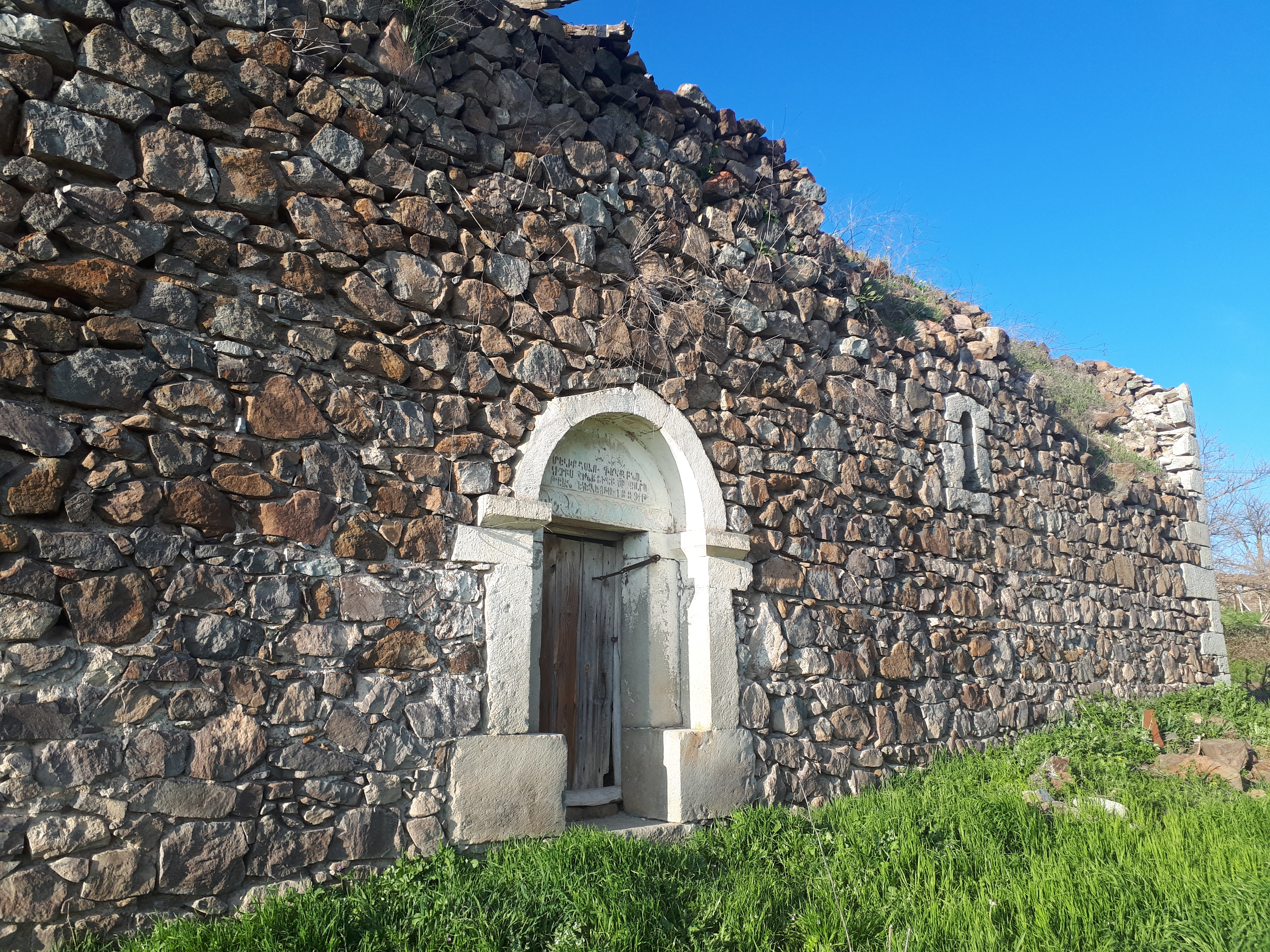
Door of the Holy Resurrection Church
