= Pat Thomson =

English-born Australian actress

Patricia Elizabeth Thomson (born 7 September 1940 in London, England – 18 April 1992 in Sydney, Australia) was an English-born Australian television and film actress.

In Sydney, she appeared as Goneril in King Lear and as the "sad-sack clown" in Clowneroonies, by Geoffrey Rush. In 1991, she played Doris in Boys From The Bush. She was best known for her role as Shirley Hastings, the over-zealous, pretentious mother of Scott Hastings in the film Strictly Ballroom, written and directed by Baz Luhrmann.

Thomson died of an aneurysm on 18 April 1992 in Sydney, Australia, missing the premiere of her last movie, Strictly Ballroom. In the same year, she posthumously won the AFI award for Best Actress in a Supporting Role in Strictly Ballroom.

She had two daughters.
