= List of operettas by Johann Strauss II =

This is a complete list of the operettas written by the Austrian composer Johann Strauss II (1825–1899). With the exceptions of Eine Nacht in Venedig and three incomplete works (Die lustigen Weiber von Wien, Romulus and Der Schelm von Bergen), all premieres took place in Vienna.

== List of operettas ==
Operettas by Johann Strauss II
Title	Genre	Acts bil je budala	Libretto	Premiere	
Title	Genre	Acts bil je budala	Libretto	Date	Venue
Die lustigen Weiber von Wien	burleske Operette	3 acts	Josef Braun	incomplete, composed c. 1868	
Romulus				incomplete, composed c. 1871	
Indigo und die vierzig Räuber	komische Operette	3 acts	Maximilian Steiner	10 February 1871	Theater an der Wien
Der Karneval in Rom	komische Operette	3 acts	Josef Braun and Karl Lindau	1 March 1873	Theater an der Wien
Die Fledermaus	komische Operette	3 acts	Karl Haffner and Richard Genée, after Henri Meilhac and Ludovic Halévy's Le réveillon	5 April 1874	Theater an der Wien
Cagliostro in Wien	komische Operette	3 acts	Friedrich Zell and Richard Genée	27 February 1875	Theater an der Wien
Prinz Methusalem	komische Operette	3 acts	Karl Treumann, after Alfred Delacour and Victor Wilder	3 January 1877	Carltheater
Blindekuh	Operette	3 acts	Rudolf Kneisel	18 December 1878	Theater an der Wien
Das Spitzentuch der Königin	Operette	3 acts	Heinrich Bohrmann-Riegen and Richard Genée, after Miguel de Cervantes	1 October 1880	Theater an der Wien
Der lustige Krieg	Operette	3 acts	Friedrich Zell and Richard Genée	25 November 1881	Theater an der Wien
Eine Nacht in Venedig	komische Operette	3 acts	Friedrich Zell and Richard Genée, after Eugène Cormon and Michel Carré's Château Trompette	3 October 1883	Berlin, Neues Friedrich Wilhelmstadisches Theater
Der Zigeunerbaron	Operette	3 acts	Ignaz Schnitzer, after Mór Jókai's Sáffi	24 October 1885	Theater an der Wien
Der Schelm von Bergen			Ignaz Schnitzer, after Heinrich Heine	incomplete, composed c. 1886	
Simplicius	Operette	prologue and 2 acts	Victor Léon, after Grimmelhausen's Der abenteuerliche Simplicissimus	17 December 1887	Theater an der Wien
Fürstin Ninetta		3 acts	Hugo Wittmann and Julius Bauer	10 January 1893	Theater an der Wien
Jabuka		3 acts	Max Kalbeck and Gustav Davis	12 October 1894	Theater an der Wien
Waldmeister	Operette	3 acts	Gustav Davis	4 December 1895	Theater an der Wien
Die Göttin der Vernunft	Operette	3 acts	Alfred Maria Willner and Bernhard Buchbinder	13 March 1897	Theater an der Wien

== Operettas arranged by others using music by Johann Strauss II (selection) ==
- La reine Indigo, opérette in 3 acts (1875)
- La tzigane, opérette in 3 acts (1877)
- Wiener Blut, Operette in 3 acts, arranged by Adolf Müller (1899)
- Gräfin Pepi, Operette in 3 acts, arranged by E Reiterer (1902)
- Tausend und eine Nacht, Operette in a prelude and 2 acts, arranged by E Reiterer (1906)
- Reiche Mädchen, Operette in 3 acts (1909)
- Der blaue Held, Operette in 3 acts (1912)
- Faschingshochzeit, Operette arranged by J Klein (1921)
- Casanova, Operette in 7 scenes, arranged by Ralph Benatzky (1928)
- Walzer aus Wien, Singspiel in 2 acts, arranged by Julius Bittner and Erich Wolfgang Korngold (1930)
- Die Tänzerin Fanny Elßler, Operette in 3 acts, arranged by Bernard Grun and Oskar Stalla (1934)

== See also ==
- Ritter Pázmán, Strauss only comic opera (1892)
