= Josef Pfundheller =

Austrian author

Josef Pfundheller (22 May 1813 – 26 February 1889) was an Austrian writer and journalist, who also appeared as a playwright of the Alt-Wiener Volkstheater.

== Life ==
Born in Vienna, Pfundheller joined the Catholic literary movement in Austria at an early stage, and from 1840 onwards he worked as a journalist for various major Viennese newspapers, such as the Österreichische Morgenblatt. From 1872 he worked as an editor at the Wiener Gemeinde-Zeitung, and in 1886/87 he was publisher and chief editor of the Österreichischen Reichsboten.

Since 1848, Pfundheller published book editions of his literary works, which often referred to historical themes. He also wrote several stage plays as theatre poet.

Pfundheller died in Vienna at the age of 75.

== Work ==
=== Plays ===
Title	Genre	Date of first performance	Venue of first performance	Music	Acts	Notes
Bankier und Maler	Biography	20.11.1847	Theater in der Josefstadt in Wien	Adolf Müller senior	3	
Ein vergilbtes Blatt	?	??.??.1847	Vienna	?	?	After a work by Johann Baptist von Alxinger.
Severin von Jaroszynski oder Der Blaumantel vom Trattnerhof	Genrebild mit Gesang und Tanz	??.??.1862	?	Anton M. Storch	4	Together with Karl Haffner Date of book release, first performance probably earlier.
Ein Spuk in der Faschingsnacht, oder: Die beiden Nachtwächter [auch umgekehrt betitelt]	Posse with Gesang und Tanz	??.??.1862	Carltheater in Wien	Johann Baptist Klerr	3	Together with Karl Haffner. Freely based on a novella by Heinrich Zschokke. Date of book release, first performance probably earlier.
Englische Industrie und österreichisches Herz	Charakterbild mit Gesang und Tanz	??.??.1863	Theater an der Wien	?	3	Together with Karl Swiedack. Date of book release, first performance probably earlier.
Der Leyrer-Jörg	Lebensbild mit Gesang und Tanz	??.??.1863	?	?	3	Together with Karl Swiedack. Publication date, first performance probably earlier.
Die Greißlerin von Hungelbrunn	Character picture	??.??.1865	Vienna	Adolf Müller senior	3	Play about Theresia Kandl (see also under Kandlkapelle). Together with Karl Haffner.

=== Publications ===
- Ein Gang durch die Vorzeit, historische Novellen, Verlag J.J. Busch, Vienna 1846
- Novellen und Erzählungen, zwei Bände, Verlag Pichler, Vienna 1848
- Der Preßproceß: "Presse contra Kirchenzeitung", Verlag C. Wendelin, Vienna 1859
- Der österreichische Angelfischer oder die Kunst des Angelns, Verlag Manz, Vienna 1861
- Die schwarze Bibliothek – eine Sammlung interessanter Criminalgeschichten mit Benützung authentischer Quellen, five volumes, Verlag Bamarski & Dittmarsch, Vienna 1861–1863
- Die Kinder des Fluchs, Roman aus dem Wiener Leben, self-published by the author, Vienna 1873
- Der Blumenkaiser – Oesterreichisches Zeit- und Culturbild, Verlag Manz, Vienna 1881
- Spaziergänge mit der Angel an der "obern" Donau, self-published by the author, Vienna 1882
- Aus dem Oesterreicher-Urlande, subtitle: Zur Erinnerung an den Sommeraufenthalt in Ardagger 1883, Vienna 1883
- Französisch-Oesterreichisch – geschichtliches Zeitbild, Biography, Verlag J. Koblischek, Vienna 1888
- Letzte Justifizierung einer weiblichen Person bei der Spinnerin am Kreuz am Wienerberge, self-published by the author, Vienna 1898 (posthum)

=== Lieder ===
- Sehnsucht. Wanderlust, together with Carl Binder and Johann Nepomuk Vogl, year unknown
