= Wenzel Scholz =

Austrian actor

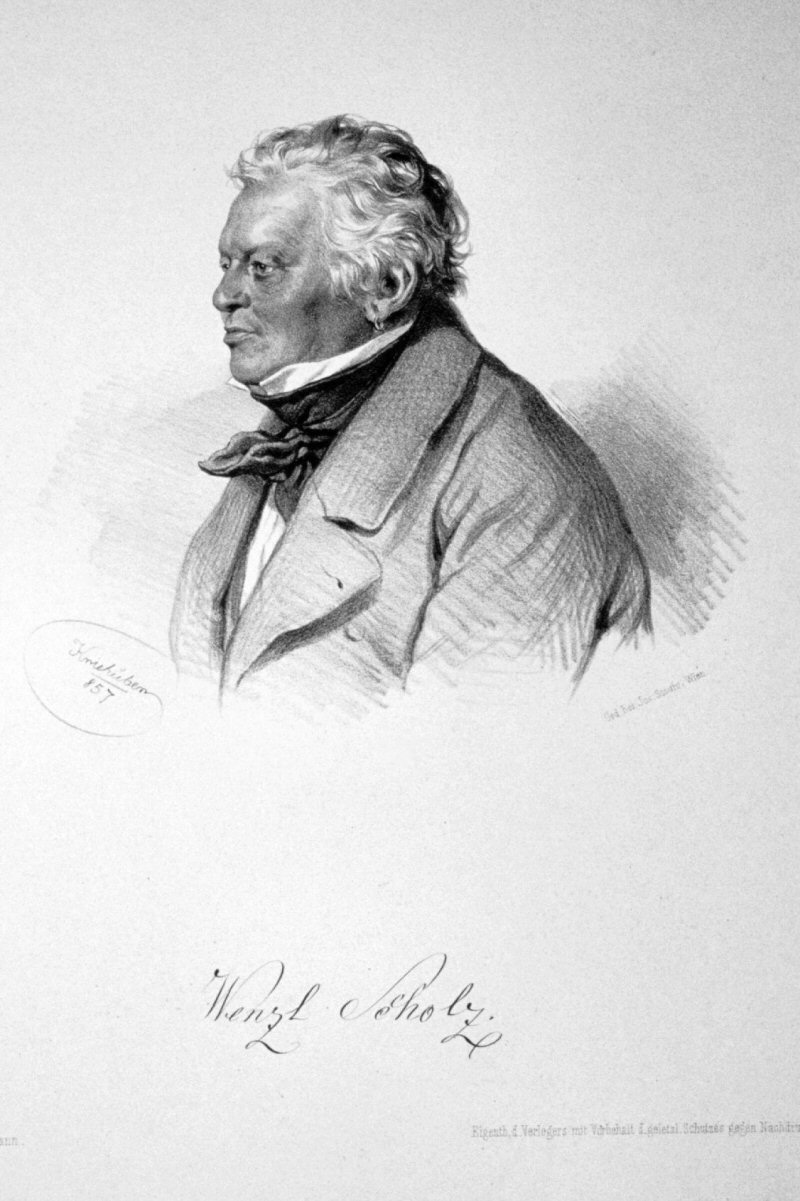
Wenzel Scholz, lithography by Joseph Kriehuber, 1857

Wenzel Johann Scholz (28 March 1787 – 5 October 1857) was an Austrian actor in Laibach, Klagenfurt, Graz and in Vienna, above all at the Alt-Wiener Volkstheater, who became known as the partner of Johann Nestroy in his Possen and Lustspiel comedies.

== Origin ==
He was born in Innsbruck, although some sources give the location as Brixen. In many biographies, Maximilian Scholz (1744–1834) is mentioned as his father. It was actually the actor Leopold Scholz (1748–1826), who was possibly a brother or close relative of Maximilian. The error may have resulted from the fact that both men were married to women with the maiden name Tilly.

== Debut ==
Scholz was the child of an actor; he showed early theatrical talent and resisted his forced apprenticeship as a merchant.

He made his debut in 1811 at the age of 24 in his mother's theatre troupe in the role of Harlequin in Friedrich Schiller's Turandot, Prinzessin von China and then appeared predominantly in Laibach and Klagenfurt. In March 1815 he was engaged for several weeks at the Hofburgtheater in Vienna, his debut was as Traugott in August von Kotzebue's play Bruderzwist oder die Versöhnung. Because his abilities went unrecognized and he "soon felt the oppressiveness of the noble atmosphere," his father forced him to perform as Kasperle as a punishment. When Scholz realized that he was destined to be a comedian in the local business, he left the Burgtheater in September 1815 and gave a guest performance at the Theater in der Leopoldstadt. Since he was not engaged there despite good reviews, he returned to Klagenfurt, where he worked until 1819 mainly in supporting and episodic roles and as a young comedian, but great success already gave him some of his later Viennese shining roles. Scholz spent the next years with various theater troupes with whom he played in the Austrian provinces of Styria and Carinthia. In 1819 he succeeded in becoming an ensemble member at the theater in Graz for seven years, where he appeared as a comedian in Kasperle, Thaddädl, and Staberl roles.

In 1826 Scholz went to Vienna again at the age of 39 to fulfill an engagement at the Theater in der Josefstadt where his first role was Truffaldino in Goldoni's The Servant of Two Masters. From May 1827 he appeared at the Theater an der Wien and pleased audiences and critics as Staberl in Bäuerle's Die Bürger in Wien. In 1826 Scholz achieved the final breakthrough to the popular folk comedian in the role of Klapperle in Karl Meisl's Die schwarze Frau, a parody, in which he brought the audience to frenzy with a grotesquely drastic appearance with a bloated neck and "no voice." According to contemporary witnesses, after performing a nonsense Wiener Couplet, he was called back to the stage up to ten times. His popularity "soon increased to worship" (Alexander von Weilen, Allgemeine Deutsche Biographie 1891).

== Scholz and Nestroy ==
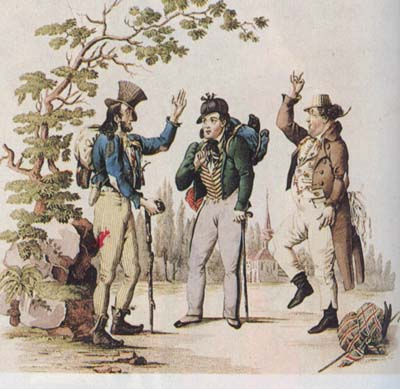
Johann Nestroy with Carl Carl and Wenzel Scholz in Der wöse Geist Lumpacivagabundus (1834)

Theatre director Carl Carl transferred Scholz to the Theater an der Wien, where he became the partner of Johann Nestroy from 1831. From 1832 to 1852 Scholz played at the Theater in der Leopoldstadt (from 1847 Carltheater). The many great successes of the famous duo came about because Nestroy wrote many roles for himself and his partner Scholz. Scholz's outward appearance, a stocky figure, a round, mostly motionless face with nimble, lively eyes and his mostly phlegmatic temperament, which stood in contrast to Nestroy, mainly contributed to the comic effect of his play. The combination Scholz/Nestroy can be compared with the famous double acts like Arlecchino and Pantalone in the Commedia dell'arte and later Karl Valentin and Liesl Karlstadt and also Laurel and Hardy.

The interplay of Scholz and Nestroy became famous in Der wöse Geist Lumpacivagabundus (1833) with Scholz as Schneider Zwirn, director Carl Carl as Tischler Leim and Nestroy as Schuster Knieriem as a "dissolute craftsman trio" (liederliches Handwerker-Kleeblatt), but also in Nestroy's Eulenspiegel adaptation (1835), in Hutmacher und Strumpfwirker (1837), as lord of Lips and locksmith Gluthammer in Der Zerrissene (1844), as servant Johann and clothes dealer Damian in Zu ebener Erde und erster Stock (1835), as hairdresser slim and clothes cleaner Hutzibutz in Das Haus der Temperamente (1837), as father and son Pfrim in Höllenangst, in Unverhofft (1845), Der Unbedeutende (1846, role of the intrigant Puffmann), Der Schützling (1847), as Holofernes in Judith und Holofernes (1849) and as the barber surgeon Gabriel Brunner in Kampl (1852).

In Nestroy's dialog drafts, the main characters are usually marked with N. and Sch, the initials of Nestroy and Scholz.

Especially for the roles of stupid, foolish servant, Scholz was made as a phlegmatic gardener's assistant in Nestroy's Der Talisman (1840) or as a domestic servant "Melchior" (a role that Nestroy had written for Scholz) in Einen Jux will er sich machen (1842), who simple-mindedly repeats the phrase: "Das is' klassisch!" In a review on 14 July 1842 of a guest performance of this play in Prague, it was said:

Nestroy's long-standing partner Wenzel Scholz performs Melchior. The role of the fat, sluggish, stupid servant, who moves across the stage like a snail, maintains a straight face and finds everything 'classical', is written especially for him. A larger contrast to the fast, hectic Nestroy is hardly conceivable, the comedy results not least from this circumstance."

Especially besides Nestroy's cutting irony, Scholz's original harmlessness was indispensable, he opposed the Karl Treumann's mercurial technique with his good-natured calm. "Johann Nestroy and Wenzel Scholz seemed to have divided themselves into the legacy of the Hanswurst: all sharpness and mobility fell to Nestroy, all width and comfort came to Scholz. Nestroy always had to achieve his success, Scholz had already won when he appeared. Scholz was a representative of the responsible, tolerating, Nestroy a representative of the active, the attacking comedy" (Speidel).

The play Eulenspiegel oder Schabernack über Schabernack was written by Nestroy in 1835 for his friend Scholz. It is remarkable that Nestroy did not play the title role himself, but chose a "fat one" for Eulenspiegel. He reserved to himself the role of the seemingly simple-minded boy Natzi, who was a forerunner of Willibald in Die schlimmen Buben in der Schule.

A humorous painting from 1848 shows Scholz and Nestroy as an "unequal 4848" National Guard pair, a militia set up by the revolutionaries in Vienna at the beginning of the 1848 Revolution. The picture was an allusion to the political intermezzo of Nestroy during the Revolution, which was reflected in his farce with the song Freiheit in Krähwinkel, which had the events of the March Revolution as background and in which Nestroy and Scholz appeared together.

Nestroy's farce in one act Die Fahrt mit dem Dampfwagen was premiered on 5 December 1834 at the Theater an der Wien for the benefit of his friend Scholz.

== Vis Comica ==
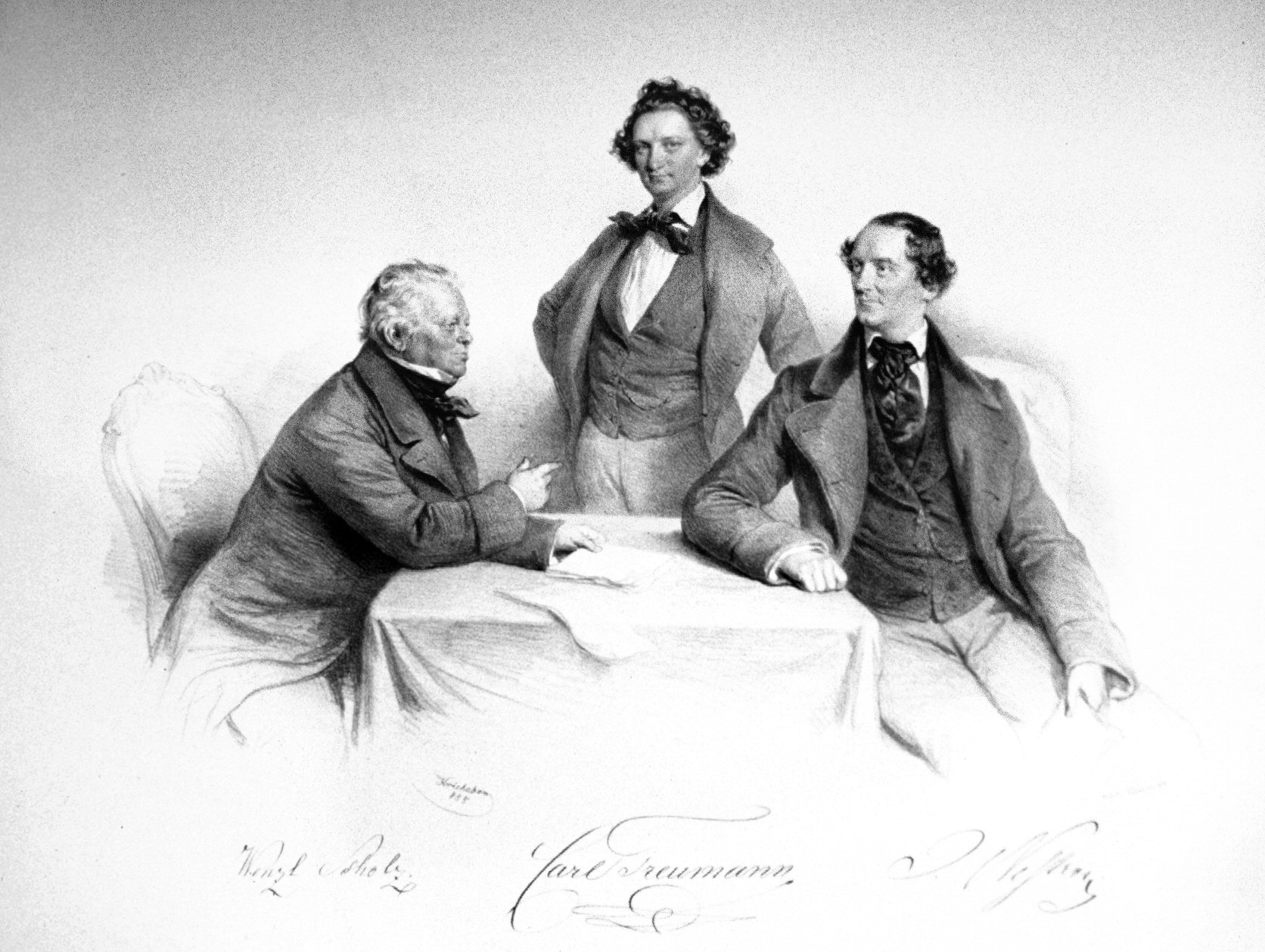
Karl Treumann with Wenzel Scholz and Johann Nestroy, lithography by Josef Kriehuber, 1855

In his comedy, Scholz was the last representative of a naive burlesque comedy in the tradition of Hanswurst. It was not until Scholz's late period that the drastic comic means were reduced in favor of a stronger internalization and psychological deepening, as in the role of the idealistic country doctor Gabriel Brunner in Nestroy's late work Kampl (1852), who wants to bring matters of love and inheritance from the high nobility to the locksmith into balance with brilliant one-line jokes, metaphors and raisonnements and as an ordering authority fights on the side of loyalty and good character.

Despite his obesity, Scholz had a high degree of agility at his disposal. Contemporaries report of a daring leap, a pirouette, which Scholz still performed at an advanced age in Nestroy's farce Der Unbedeutende and which prompted the audience to ovations and applause.

The Viennese court actor Karl Ludwig Costenoble wrote about Scholz: "The man has an unspeakable power! He can repeat the blandest things three or four times—they never get boring; on the contrary, he recites one and the same idea or remark so differently in his varying tones that the laughter is always increased." In his genre Scholz was unequalled until an equal successor was found in Josef Matras.

On 28 March 1856 the anonymous one-act play Wenzel Scholz und Die chinesische Prinzessin was performed in the Carl-Theater on the occasion of his 70th birthday. Scholz searched in vain for an author to write a play for him and received a package containing only empty sheets. With the help of a few bottles of wine to "inspire" him, he decided to write the play himself and fell asleep over it. The dream led him to China, where he was to marry a princess and, exposed as a comedian, lose his life. Just in time he woke up and had the material he was looking for.

This one-act play is testimony to the collaboration of the famous comedian quartet Johann Nestroy, Wenzel Scholz, Karl Treumann and Alois Grois at the Carltheater at a turning point from the comedy of the farcical Alt-Wiener Volkstheater, which ended with Scholz, to the 'new' comedy after 1850 on the way to operette.

Karl Haffner made Scholz the hero of a drama (Wenzel Scholz, a genre picture from the life of an artist with song and dance in three acts, 1858) and a folk novel.

== Personal life ==
Scholz was married twice. His first marriage was to Antonia Rupp, the daughter of a printer. The couple had four children: two sons—Eduard (who died in 1844 at the age of 34) and Anton (who died by suicide in 1846)—and two daughters—Josephine Leeb and Karoline von Franck (married to Alfred Ritter von Franck). Both daughters pursued modest acting careers, though without notable success. The marriage was reportedly unhappy, with contemporary accounts suggesting that Antonia was financially irresponsible.

Following Antonia's death in 1844, Scholz remarried six years later. His second wife was Therese Miller. This marriage, which took place later in Scholz's life, remained childless. Scholz is also known to have had one illegitimate child, though details are scarce.

Privately, Scholz was known to be serious and taciturn. He took particular pleasure in tobacco and card games—pastimes he indulged in regularly, despite often losing, which reportedly led to significant financial hardship. Director Carl Carl aware of Scholz's monetary difficulties, frequently offered him support in the form of advances, loans, and by purchasing the rights to benefit performances. It was only under Johann Nestroy's management that Scholz began to receive compensation that matched his popularity and artistic merit.

Scholz was the only actor named in Carl Carl's will, receiving a generous pension. However, Carl Carl denied him the opportunity to join the k.k. Burgtheater, at the time considered the pinnacle of an Austrian actor's career.

Scholz died in Vienna at the age of 70, following a brief illness. His funeral reportedly drew immense public attention, with tens of thousands of Viennese attending the procession to the old cemetery in Dornbach. Hundreds of theatre personnel followed the coffin. His longtime friend and stage partner, Johann Nestroy, did not attend the funeral, claiming he could not bear the thought of death.

In 1900, at the request of his granddaughter, Scholz's remains were exhumed and reinterred in Traunkirchen.

Scholz is commemorated on the safety curtain of the Theater an der Wien, depicted alongside Johann Nestroy, Ferdinand Raimund, and Mozart's The Magic Flute.

== Bibliography ==
- Carl Haffner, Adolf Müller (Music): Wenzl Scholz. Skizzen aus dem Künstlerleben mit Gesang in drei Akten. Sommer (Druck), Wien 1859. – Read online.
- Karl Haffner: Scholz und Nestroy. Roman aus dem Künstlerleben. Drei Bände. Markgraf, Wien 1866 (Digitalisat volume 1, volume 2, volume 3)
- Constantin von Wurzbach: Scholz, Wenzel. In Biographisches Lexikon des Kaiserthums Oesterreich. 31. Theil. Kaiserlich-königliche Hof- und Staatsdruckerei, Wien 1876, p. 212–230
- Alexander von Weilen (1891). "Scholz, Wenzel" . Allgemeine Deutsche Biographie (in German). Vol. 32. Leipzig: Duncker & Humblot. pp. 230–231.
- J. Seyfried: Wenzel Scholz. In: Paul Wertheimer (publisher): Alt-Wiener Theater. Schilderungen von Zeitgenossen. Knepler, Wien 1920, p. 226 ff.
- Carl Haffner: Nestroy und Scholz. Zwei von Humor. Ein Stück Wiener Theatergeschichte um Nestroy und Scholz. Göth, Wien 1946.
- Ursula Deck: Wenzel Scholz und das Alt-Wiener Volkstheater. Ein Beitrag zur Geschichte der Wiener Volkskomik. Dissertation. Universität Wien, Wien 1968.
- E(dgar) Marktl: "Scholz Wenzel (Wenzislaus Johann)". In: Österreichisches Biographisches Lexikon 1815–1950 (ÖBL). Vol. 11, Austrian Academy of Sciences, Vienna 1999, ISBN 3-7001-2803-7, p. 132–134. (Direct links to "p. 132", "p. 133", "p. 134")
- Jürgen Hein (publisher): Wenzel Scholz und Die chinesische Prinzessin. Quodlibet, volume 5, ZDB-ID 2266183-9. Lehner, Wien 2003, ISBN 3-901749-34-9.
- Ralph-Günther Patocka (2007). "Scholz, Wenzel Johann". Neue Deutsche Biographie (in German). Vol. 23. Berlin: Duncker & Humblot. pp. 462–463. (full text online).
- Vlasta Reittererová: Wenzel Scholz (1797–1857) – ein Wiener Komiker in Prag, ISBN 978-80-7008-355-0.
