= Karl Haffner =

German actor and librettist (1804-1876)

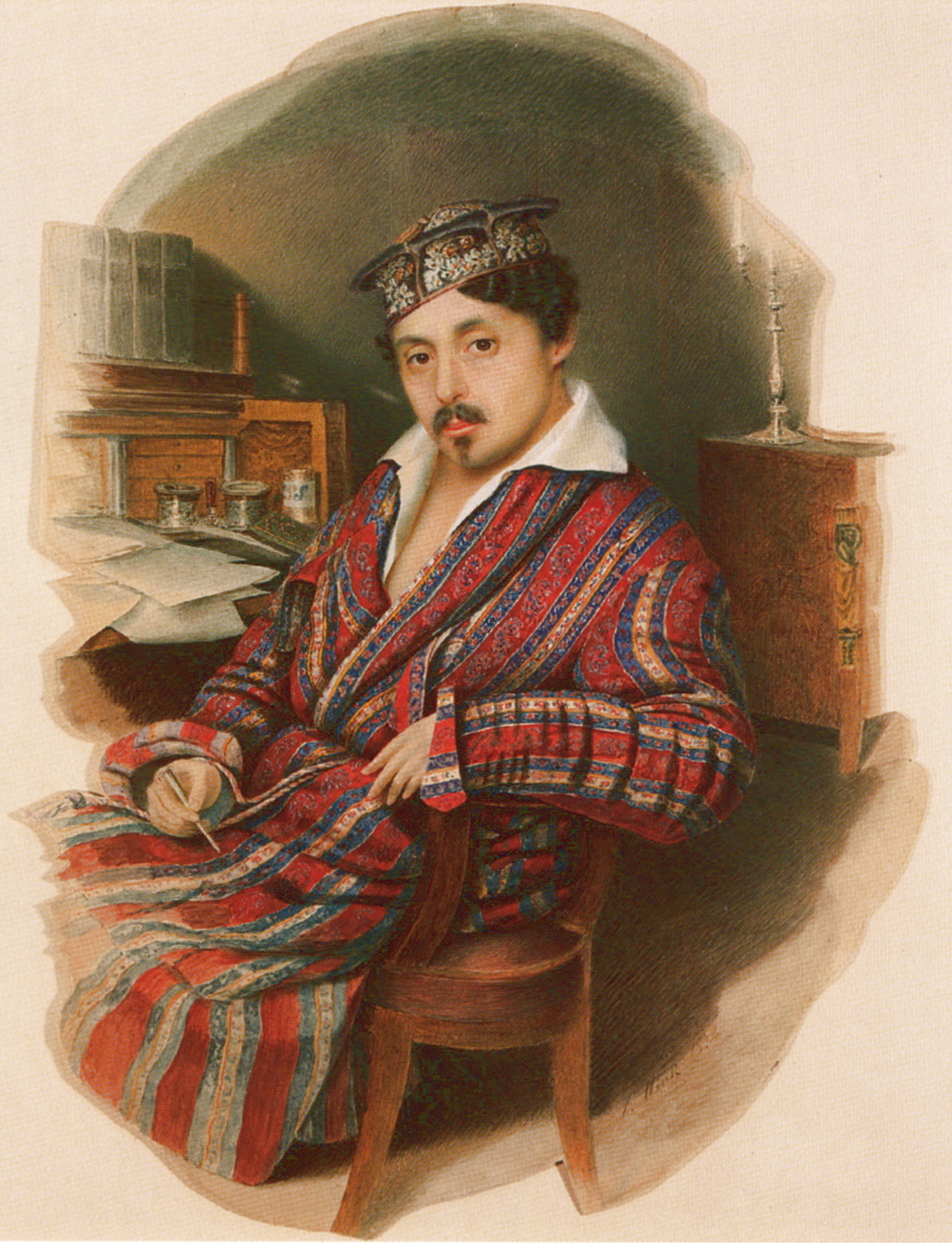
Haffner in 1842

Karl Haffner (pseudonym), real name Karl Schlechter, (8 November 1804 – 29 February 1876) was a German dramaturge.

== Life and work ==
Born in Königsberg, Haffner attended the Collegium Fridericianum. Already at the age of 16 he joined a travelling troupe and as a travelling comedian he passed through Prussia, Saxony, Silesia, Austria and Hungary. After ten years he became a dramatist and playwright at the Pest Theater with Feodor Grimm, after he had already made some dramatic attempts before.

In Pest he wrote tragedies like The robbery shooters, The curl of the decapitated, Blocks of the grave, Schwarzenberg and Palffy and Batorys Tod, which received the stormy applause of the audience. The well-known theatre director Carl Carl in Vienna strangely recognized Haffner's talent for the local posse in this work and engaged him for nine years for the Theater an der Wien as a theatre poet. Haffner had to commit himself to the delivery of eleven plays per year and he kept this contract. Later he turned to the Theater in der Josefstadt and edited the satirical weekly Böse Zungen.

Haffner achieved his first major success with the romantic-comical folk tale Das Marmor-Herz, which won a second prize in 1841 and was premiered on 21 April that year at the Theater an der Wien. Permanently his three-act genre picture Therese Krones has been preserved, in which he brought the Raimund circle onto the stage. Besides dramas Haffner also wrote more than 30 volumes of novels. One of them, Scholz and Nestroy (1864 to 1866, 3 volumes), contains various things about the history of his life.

Together with Richard Genée he wrote the libretto of the Operetta Die Fledermaus (music: Johann Strauss II)

Critics have treated Haffner with little encouragement and leniency, although humour and skilful character drawing cannot be denied in his plays.

Haffner, during his last years of life incapable of working due to illness and pensioner of the Presseclub Concordia, left a large family in misery and distress; he was buried in the Wiener Zentralfriedhof (3-4-41) in a dedicated grave of the city of Vienna. In 1955, in Vienna Donaustadt (22nd district of Vienna), the Haffnergasse was named after him.

== Work ==
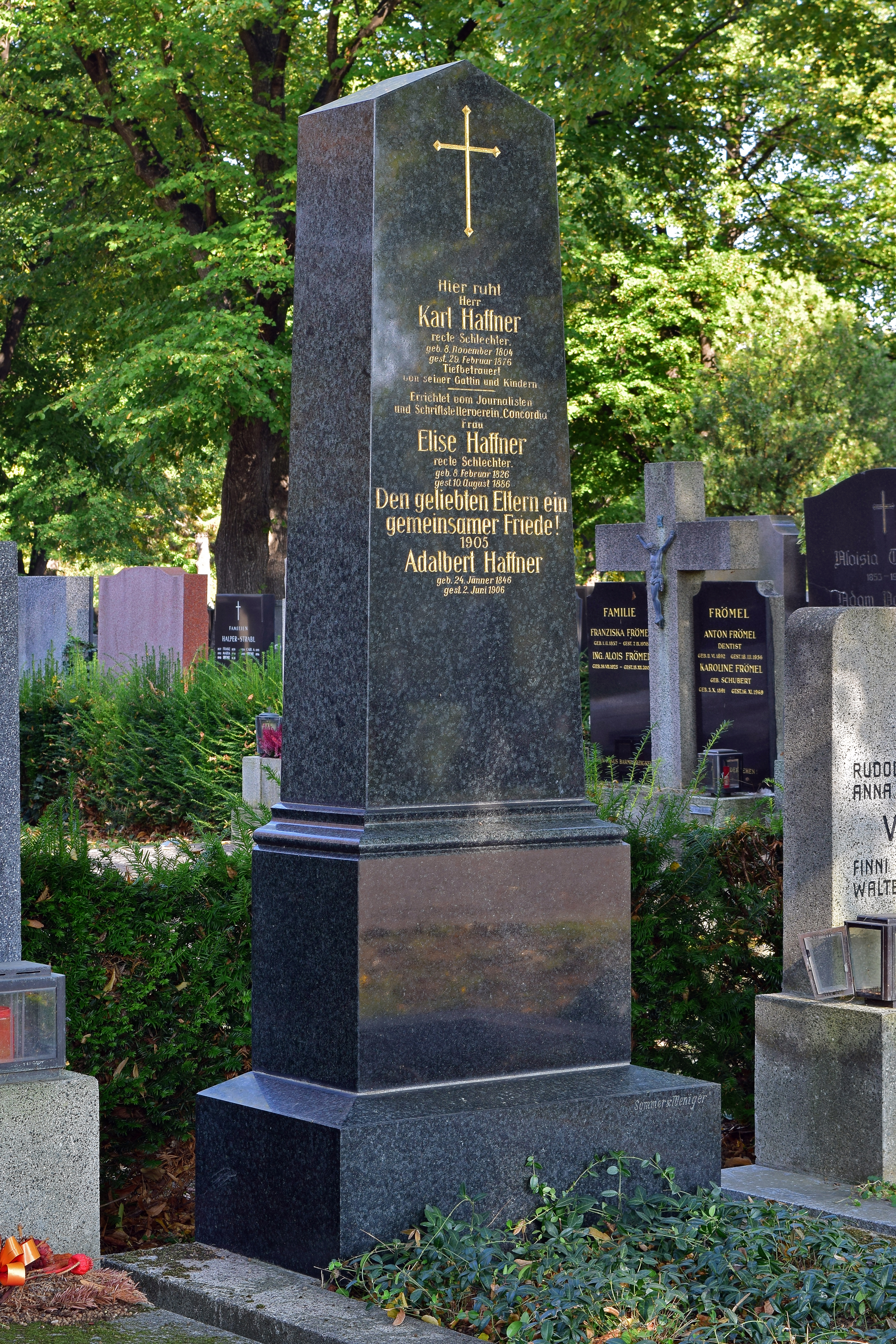
Tomb of Karl Haffner

- Oesterreichisches Volks-Theater. Reclam, Leipzig 1845. Volume 1/3:
  - Das Marmor-Herz. Romantisch-komisches Volks-Mährchen mit Gesang, in drei Aufzügen. Music by Adolf Müller. (world premiere 1841). pp. 5–98– Online,
  - Der wilde Jäger oder: Das rothe Häuschen. Charakter-Skizze mit Gesang in drei Aufzügen. Music by Michael Hebenstreit. (world premiere 1841). pp. 99–164– Online,
  - Der Tod und der Wunder-Doctor. Komisches Volks-Mährchen mit Gesang in drei Aufzügen. Music by Michael Hebenstreit. (world premiere 1841). pp. 165–240– Online.
- Oesterreichisches Volks-Theater. Reclam, Leipzig 1846. Volume 2/3:
  - Die Thränenquelle. Romantisch-komisches Mährchen mit Gesang in zwei Aufzügen. Nebst einem damit verbundenen Vorspiele. Musik von Adolf Müller. (world premiere 1842). pp. 1–68. – Online,
  - Die Wiener Stubenmädchen oder: Der Ball in der Schuster-Werkstatt. Posse mit Gesang in zwei Aufzügen. Musik von Michael Hebenstreit. (world premiere 1840). pp. 69–132– Online,
  - Der Stock im Eisen oder: Das schwarze Weib im Wiener-Walde. Romantisch-komisches Volks-Mährchen mit Gesang in vier Aufzügen. Musik von Adolf Müller. (world premiere 1839). pp. 133–196– Online.
- Oesterreichisches Volks-Theater. Reclam, Leipzig 1846. Volume 3/3:
  - Peter Kranau oder: Der Räuber und sein Kind. Drama mit Gesang und Tanz in zwei Aufzügen. Musik von Carl Binder. (world premiere 1843). pp. 1–68– Online,
  - Asmodus, der hinkende Teufel oder: Eine Promenade durch drei Jahrhunderte. Komischer Bilderkasten mit Gesang und Tanz in drei Abtheilungen. Musik von Adolf Müller. (world premiere 1839). pp. 69–142– Online,
  - Der Zeitgeist oder: Ein Besuch aus der Vorzeit. Komisches Phantasie-Gemäldemit Gesang in drei Aufzügen. Musik von Adolf Müller. (world premiere 1841). pp. 143–224– Online.
- —, Adolf Müller senior (music): Das Reserl am Krippenstein. Posse mit Gesang in drei Abtheilungen, aufgeführt auf der k. k. priv. Josefstädter-Bühne in Wien. Manuscript, Vienna 1850. – Online.
- —, Adolf Müller (music): Wenzl Scholz. Skizzen aus dem Künstlerleben mit Gesang in drei Akten. Sommer, Vienna 1859. – Online.
- —, Adolf Müller (music): Die Studenten von Rummelstadt. Genrebild mit Gesang und Tanz in drei Akten. Manuscript, Vienna 1861. – Online.
- —, Josef Pfundheller, Johann Baptist Klerr (music): Die beiden Nachtwächter oder Ein Spuk in der Faschingsnacht. Posse mit Gesang und Tanz in drei Acten, frei nach einer Novelle von H(einrich) Zschokke. Wallishausser, Vienna 1862. – Online.
- —, Josef Pfundheller, Anton M. Storch (music): Severin von Jaroszynski oder Der Blaumantel vom Trattnerhof. Genrebild mit Gesang und Tanz in vier Acten als Seitenstück zu Therese Krones. Wallishausser, Vienna 1862. – Online.
- —, Adolf Müller (music): Therese Krones. Genrebild mit Gesang und Tanz in drei Acten. Manuscript, Vienna 1862. – Online.
- —, Julius Hopp (music): Die lange Nase. Posse mit Gesang in einem Acte. Libretto. Manuskript, Vienna 1863. – Online.
- —, Adolf Müller (music): Die Sternenjungfrau. Romantisch-komisches Märchen mit Gesang und Tanz in drei Abtheilungen. Manuscript, Vienna 1863. – Online.
- Louis Napoleon und die Pfarrerstochter. Original-Roman. Albert Last, Vienna 1866. – Volume 1/3 online; Volume 2/3 online; Volume 3/3 online.
- Scholz und Nestroy. Roman aus dem Künstlerleben. Hermann Markgraf, Vienna 1866. – Volume 1/3 online; Volume 2/3 online; Volume 3/3 online.
- Nonne und Maitresse. Roman aus dem Wiener Leben. Albert Last, Vienna 1867. – Volume 1/3 online; Band 2/3 online; Volume 3/3 online.
- Die schönen Weiber von Wien. Humoristischer Roman aus dem Wiener-Volksleben. Albert Last, Vienna 1867. – Volume 1/2 online; Volume 2/2 online.
- Jungfernblut. Original-Roman. Edwin Müller, Vienna 1869. – Volume 1/3 online; Volume 2/3 online; Volume 3/3 online.
- Was sich die Kammerzofen erzählen. Roman. Edwin Müller, Vienna 1870. – Volume 1/3 online; Volume 2/3 online; Volume 3/3 online.
- Der verkaufte Schlaf. Romantisch-komisches Märchen mit Gesang und Tanz in drei Aufzügen nach Moritz Gottlieb Saphir's Gedicht gleichen Namens. In den K. K. pr. Theatern an der Wien und in der Josefstadt mit großem Beifall aufgeführt. Reclam, Leipzig 1870. – Online.
- Die Kinder von Neudorf. Roman. J. Neidl, Wien 1871. – Online.
- Der Mann ohne Herz. Roman. J. Neidl, Wien 1871. – Online.
- Johann Strauss, —, Richard Genée: Arien & Gesänge aus: Die Fledermaus, komische Operette in drei Acten after (Henri) Meilhac and (Ludovic) Halévy. Lewy, Vienna ca. 1874. – Online.
- Bekannte und unbekannte Grössen. Skizzen und Novelletten aus der Kunst- und Theaterwelt von Carl Haffner. Vienna: Selbstverlag der Witwe des Verfassers Frau Elise Haffner: In Commission bei H. Engel, 1884. books.google.
