= Therese Braunecker-Schäfer =

Austrian opera singer

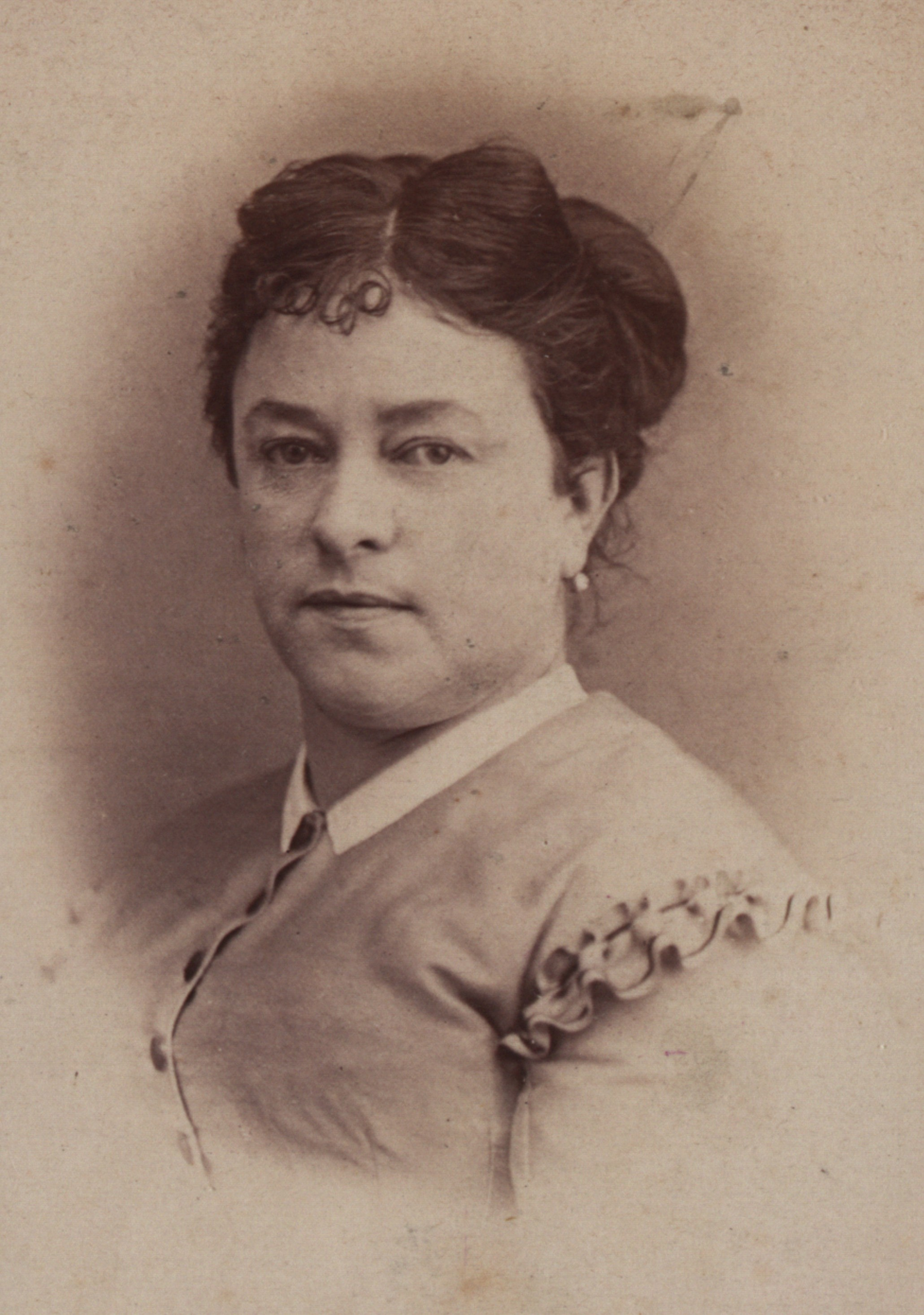
Photograph of Braunecker-Schäfer by Friedrich Wendling, c. 1870

Therese von Braunecker-Schäfer (3 April 1825 – 8 March 1888) was an Austrian theatre actress, soprano, and dancer.

== Life ==
Born in Vienna, she showed talent for theatre at an early age and was engaged at the Deutsche Theater in Pest in 1850.

There she attracted attention by her lively character, and already after one year of activity, she was chosen by director Johann Hoffmann for the State Opera in Prague. She appeared on June 3 in Das Versprechen hinterm Herd and in Family Fliedermüller and struck with her strongly parodistic coarseness, her almost trivial, but fresh and powerful playing. Her engagement was regarded as the event of 1851 in the field of the burlesque under Hoffmann's direction and as the greatest act during his last years as director in Prague. When Stöger took over the direction, he was first and foremost concerned with preserving this Austrian local singer, who was already excellent at that time, for his institute. The time of her Prague artistic activity (1851 to 1855) remained unforgotten for a long time.

She caused a special sensation as a "false Pepita", because she danced the Madrilena with such perfect grace that she aroused enthusiastic rejoicing with her performances.

With the Madrilena she decided on 25 March 1855 to end her artistic activity at the Prague Landestheater. She came to Vienna at the Karltheater. There she worked as one of the most outstanding and most popular members beside Wenzel Scholz, Johann Nestroy and Karl Treumann, with whom she also changed to the Quaitheater. With the exception of the year 1869, in which she was active at the Lemberger Stadttheater, she also remained faithful to her hometown.

Under Anton Ascher and Franz von Jauner she entered the field of the comical elderly. On 1 October 1880 she appeared in the operetta Das Spitzentuch der Königin for the first time in the Theater an der Wien, on which stage she remained until her retirement.

For the last time before her illness, she appeared before her numerous admirers at the Theater auf der Wieden on November 18, 1886. Then she retired to her relatives in Jihlava, where she died on March 8, 1888

== Bibliography ==
- Ludwig Eisenberg: Großes biographisches Lexikon der Deutschen Bühne im XIX. Jahrhundert. Edited by Paul List, Leipzig 1903, p. 122.
- Therese Braunecker-Schäfer on Operissimo from the Großes Sängerlexikon
