= Leonhard Kohl von Kohlenegg =

Austrian journalist and author (1834–1875)

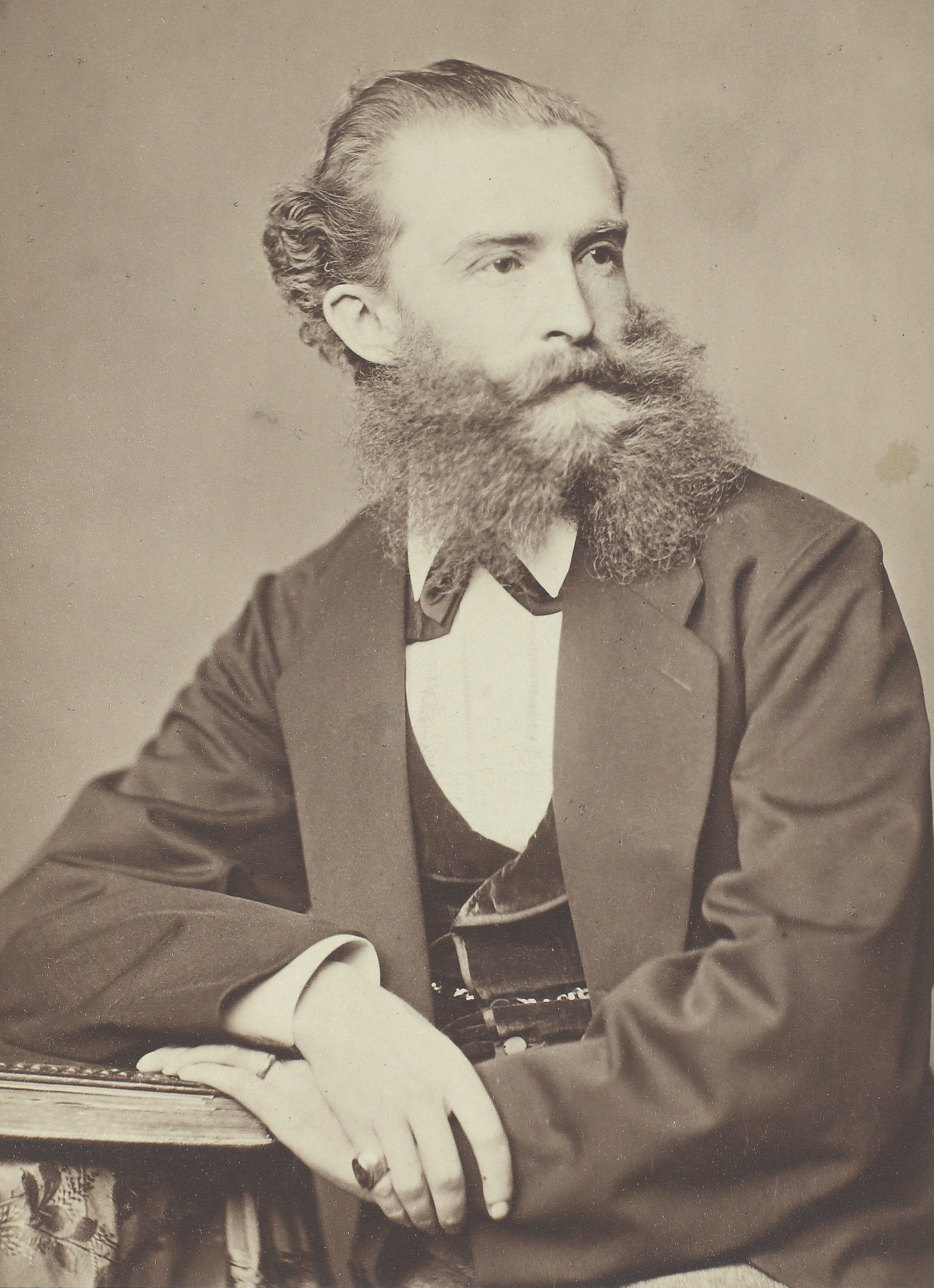
Kohl von Kohlenegg, photograph by Franz Hanfstaengl, c. 1870

Leonhard Kohl von Kohlenegg, also Karl Leopold Kohl von Kohlenegg, better known by his pseudonym Henrion Poly, (13 December 1834 – 1 May 1875) was an Austrian writer and actor.

== Life ==
Born in Vienna, the son of the painter Lorenz Kohl von Kohlenegg, he was to pursue a military career, but could assert himself in the family and was allowed to go to the theatre. In 1848 he made his debut as an actor at a theater in Vienna, according to the ÖBL.

According to Eisenberg, however, he was first an officer in Austrian service, who left the army unit after the Peace of Villafranca and then went to Paris and later to Hamburg in order to make his debut under the pseudonym Henrion after a short period of preparation.

In 1860, at the age of 26, he got an engagement at the Thaliatheater in Hamburg, and in 1861 he went for one year to the Hoftheater in Stuttgart. In 1862 he entered the city theater in Mainz not only as an actor but also as a theatre director. From 1867, Kohlenegg made many tours, among others to Frankfurt, Prague, Vienna and Königsberg. On these tours his first own plays could already be played successfully.

In his hometown Vienna, to which Kohl von Kohlenegg liked to return again and again, he was mainly active as a writer. He often used the pseudonym Henrion Poly. (Note: In Eisenberg's encyclopedia, Henrion Poly is printed in bold, so it can be assumed that Henrion Poly is a two-part surname pseudonym and Poly is not a first name. When looking at Eisenberg's side, this immediately catches the eye: the actors in front are Henneberg A n n a and Hennig A d o l f and the actors behind are Hensel' H e i n r i c h and Hensel W i l h e l m. This spelling is valid for the entire encyclopedia.)

For a short time he was editor of the Dresdener Presse in 1872, and from 1873 also its editor.

Kohl von Kohlenegg is the father of Viktor von Kohlenegg.

On 1 May 1875 Kohl von Kohlenegg died in Saalfeld (Thuringia).

== Works ==
- Die Königin ist verliebt (1857)
- In der Bastille (1862)
- Meine Memoiren (1862)
- Kammerwahlen im Carneval (1863)
- Ein unschuldiger Diplomat (1864)
- Geheirathet (1865)
- Die schöne Galathée (libretto) (1865)
- Brididi (1870)
- Für nervöse Frauen (1870)
- Moderne Sirenen (1871)
- Kleine Indiscretionen über große Leute (1872)
- Die Liebesdiplomaten (1880)

== Bibliography ==
- Ludwig Eisenberg: Großes biographisches Lexikon der Deutschen Bühne im XIX. Jahrhundert. Edition by Paul List, Leipzig 1903, p. 418.
- Hanus: "Kohl von Kohlenegg Leonhard". In: Österreichisches Biographisches Lexikon 1815–1950 (ÖBL). Vol. 4, Austrian Academy of Sciences, Vienna 1969, p. 60 f. (Direct links to "p. 60", "p. 61")
