= Die schöne Galathée =

1865 operetta by Franz von Suppé

- Operetta by Franz von Suppé
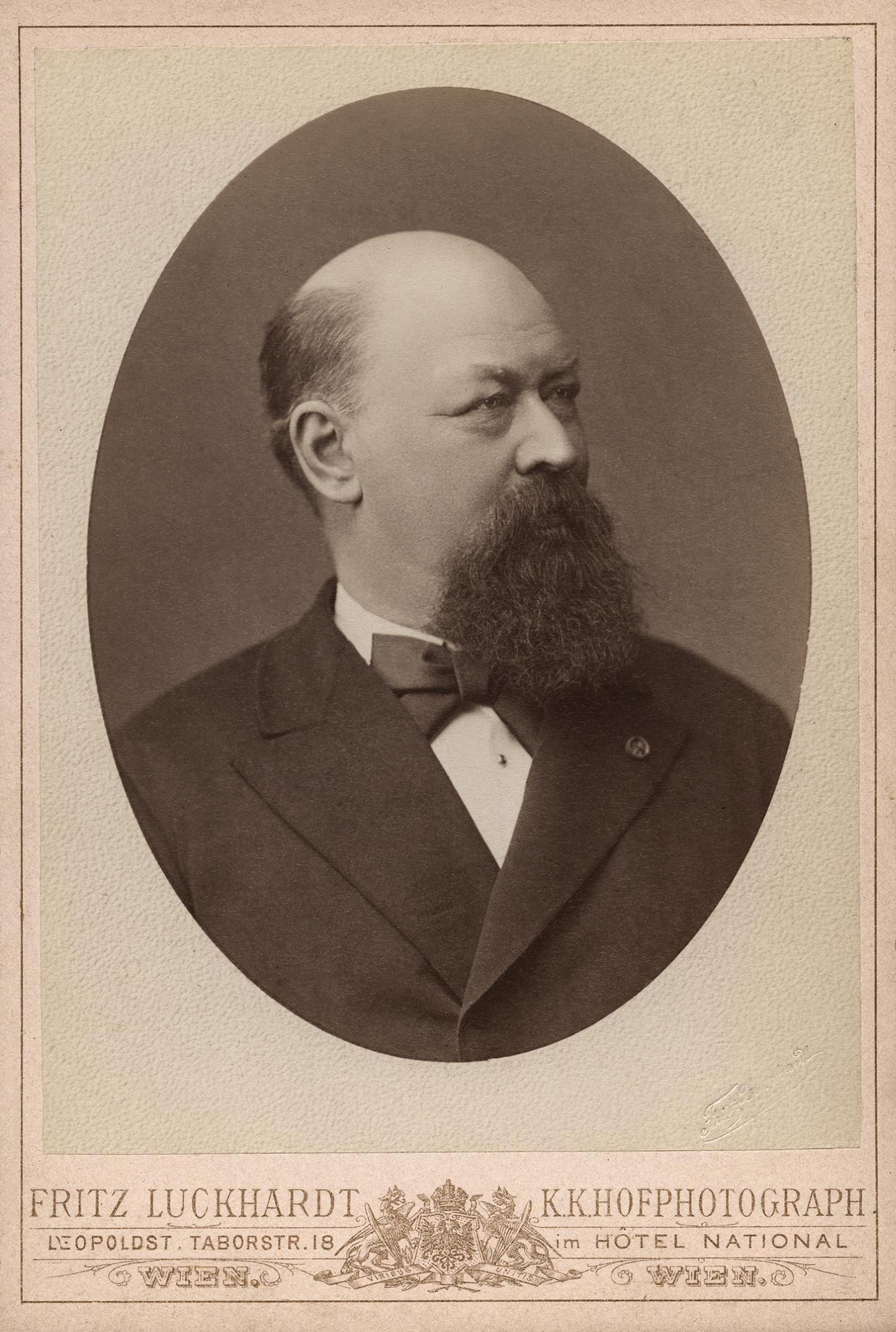
- The composer of the operetta, c. 1885
- Translation: The Beautiful Galatea
- Librettist: Franz von Suppé; Leonhard Kohl von Kohlenegg
- Language: German
- Based on: Myth of Galatea
- Premiere: 30 June 1865; Woltersdorff-Theater, Berlin

Die schöne Galathée (The Beautiful Galatea) is an operetta in one act by Franz von Suppé to a German libretto by the composer and 'Poly Henrion' (the pseudonym of Leonhard Kohl von Kohlenegg).

In the early 1860s, French operettas by Jacques Offenbach were first presented in Vienna. Franz von Suppé was obliged to compete with them by taking the time-honored traditions of Vienna and combining it with the new style of Offenbach. Die schöne Galathée was Franz von Suppé's first critical success.

== Performance history ==
The first performance was at the Meysels-Theater in Berlin on 30 June 1865, with Anna Grobecker of the Vienna Carltheater as a guest star singing the role of Ganymed. It was given in London at the Opera Comique, on 6 November 1871, and in New York at the Stadt Theater on 6 September 1867.

== Roles and role creators ==
- Galathée (Galatea) (soprano) Ämilie Kraft
- Ganymed (Ganymede) (mezzo-soprano) Anna Grobecker
- Mydas (Midas) (baritone) Karl Treumann
- Pygmalion (tenor) Telek

== Synopsis ==
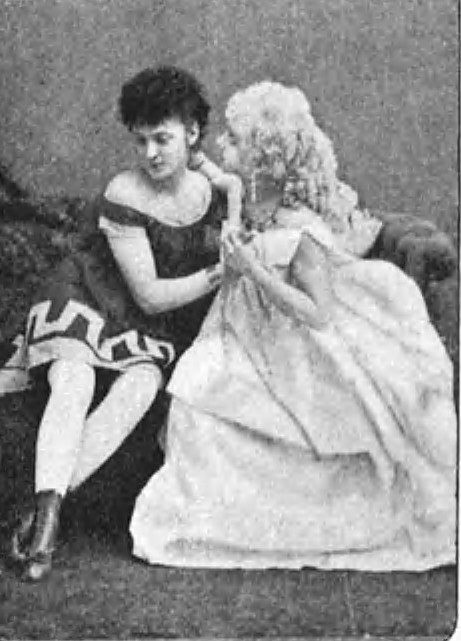
Ganymed and Galathée as played by the actresses Kathinka Hoppé and Marie Le Seur

The sculptor Pygmalion has fallen madly in love with his statue of Galathée and accordingly does not want to sell it to Mydas, a patron of the arts. Instead he prays to Venus, the goddess of the love, that the statue be brought to life. The wish is granted but Galathée turns out to be a very independent-minded creature. She is unfaithful to Pygmalion with his servant Ganymed (because he is much more pleasing to her than Pygmalion) and does not reject Mydas, who offers her jewelry. When Pygmalion catches Galathée in a compromising situation, he successfully implores Venus to turn her back into stone. The jewelry offered by Mydas is also turned into stone, but the whole statue is sold to him.
