= Anna Grobecker =

German opera singer

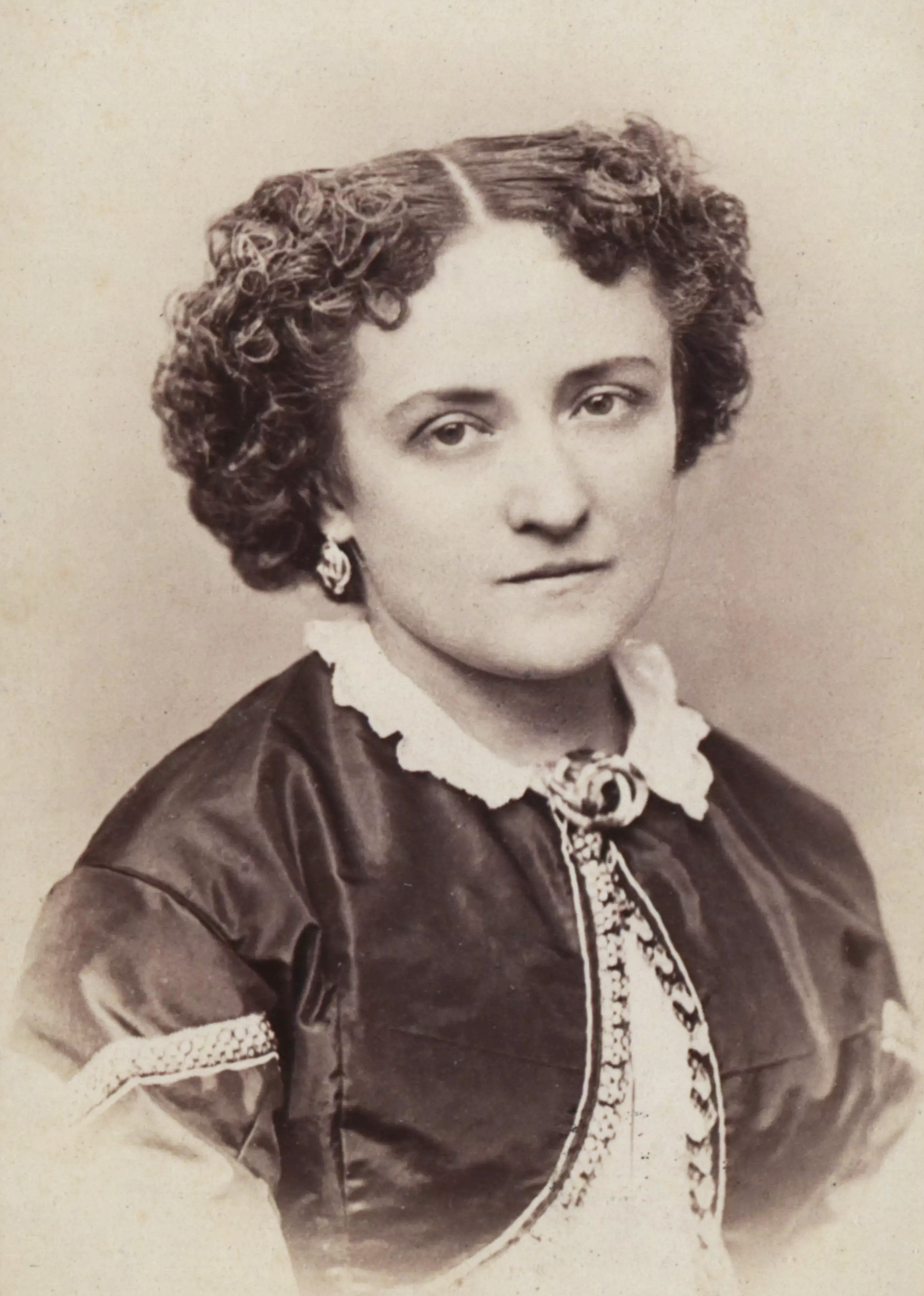
Photograph of Grobecker, c. 1865

Anna Grobecker, sometimes referred to by her maiden name Anna Mejo or as Anna Grobecker-Mejo, (27 July 1829 – 27 September 1908) was a German mezzo-soprano who appeared in many operas and operettas. She was a skilled comic actress and was most popular in "trousers roles".

== Life and career ==
Anna Mejo was born in Breslau, Kingdom of Prussia on 27 July 1829. She was the daughter of opera singers Franz Mejo and Rosa Mejo-Straub, one of their seven children, all of whom had stage careers. Her sister was the operatic soprano Jenny Mejo. She began her career on the stage as a child; making her first appearance at a very young age in Breslau in a production of Der Rattenfänger von Hameln (English: Pied Piper of Hamelin) that was directed by her father.

After working for several years as a child performer at the Hoftheater Braunschweig, Mejo performed her first adult role at the age of 15 in Magdeburg in 1844. In 1848 she appeared in a stage play in Leipzig in which she performed two songs. Her singing in this production drew the attention of the Berlin theatre director Carl who subsequently had Grobecker trained as a soubrette. In 1850 she married the actor Philipp Grobecker, and was thereafter known by the name Anna Grobecker.

Grobecker performed in Berlin as a soubrette from 1850 - 1858. In 1858, during a guest appearance in Budapest, she was seen by Johann Nestroy, who brought her to Vienna. There she appeared at the Carltheater in operettas, especially in the works of Jacques Offenbach and Franz von Suppé, until 1871.

Anna Grobecker was the first operetta singer to be invited to perform for the Imperial Court in Vienna, in 1861. In 1865, she made a guest appearance at the Meysels-Theater, Berlin, creating the trousers part of Ganymed in Suppe's Die schöne Galathée. In 1869, she made guest appearances in Paris, by the arrangement of Offenbach, and was known as "the Queen of the trousers roles". She was married to actor Phillip Grobecker between 1856 and 1860.

She retired in 1874 and divided her time between Italy and Austria. She died on 27 September 1908 in Althofen, Austria.
