= Richard Groner =

Austrian historian and journalist

Richard Groner (3 October 1853 – 15 June 1931, idem) was an Austrian local historian and journalist.

== Life ==
Born in Vienna, the son of a civil servant, Groner entered the service of the later Imperial Royal Austrian State Railways in 1871, but found time for journalistic activities at the Familienjournal (from 1875) and Das interessante Blatt (from 1881). Together with Ludwig Eisenberg he founded the biographical yearbook Das geistige Wien, which was published annually from 1889 onwards.

He became famous through his Vienna encyclopaedia Wien wie es war, which appeared in its first edition in 1919 and only dealt with the time up to the Congress of Vienna. The third, extended edition was edited after Groner's death by Otto Erich Deutsch (1934); the sixth edition was published in 1966. In 1974, Felix Czeike and his collaborators published the Große Groner Wien Lexikon, which still had Groner's name in its title, but was based only in its topographical part on Groner's work.

Auguste Groner, Groner's wife (néé Kopallik; 1850-1929) was also active as a writer.

He was buried in an honorary grave at the Hietzing Cemetery (group 4, number 88).

== Publications ==
- Parts with Ludwig Eisenberg: Das geistige Wien. Künstler- und Schriftsteller-Lexikon. Daberkow u. a., Vienna 1889–1893, ZDB-ID 1308834-8.
- Wien wie es war. Ein Auskunftsbuch über Alt-Wiener Baulichkeiten, Hausschilder, Plätze und Straßen, sowie über allerlei sonst Wissenswertes aus der Vergangenheit der Stadt. Waldheim-Eberle, Wien 1919.

== Sources ==
- Felix Czeike: Historisches Lexikon Wien. Volume 2: De–Gy. Kremayr & Scheriau, Vienna 1993, ISBN 3-218-00544-2, p. 608.
- "Groner, Richard". In: Österreichisches Biographisches Lexikon 1815–1950 (ÖBL). Vol. 2, Austrian Academy of Sciences, Vienna 1959, p. 72.
