= The Big Chance (1934 film) =

1934 film

- German film poster
- German: Die große Chance
- Directed by: Victor Janson
- Written by: Alfred Möller (play); Hans Lorenz (play); Peter Francke
- Produced by: Max G. Hüske
- Starring: Hansi Niese; Hans Söhnker; Jakob Tiedtke
- Cinematography: Bruno Timm
- Edited by: Roger von Norman
- Music by: Will Meisel
- Production company: Terra Film
- Distributed by: Terra Film
- Release date: 31 March 1934
- Running time: 85 minutes
- Country: Germany
- Language: German

The Big Chance (German: Die große Chance) is a 1934 German musical comedy film directed by Victor Janson and starring Hansi Niese, Hans Söhnker and Jakob Tiedtke. It is part of the tradition of operetta films.

The film's sets were designed by the art directors Robert A. Dietrich and Bruno Lutz.

== Cast ==
- Hansi Niese as Lenchen Menzel
- Hans Söhnker as Thomas, his son
- Jakob Tiedtke as Oskar Borke, retired border guard
- Walter Steinbeck as Ullmann, general manager
- Camilla Horn as Helga, their daughter
- Trude Hesterberg as Renate Rodenbeck
- Hubert von Meyerinck as Georg, ihr Sohn
- Alfred Haase as Max Wellhagen, employee at Ullmann-Werke
- Werner Schott as Hans Raschdorf, chief engineer
- Paul Henckels as Otto Meckeritz, office manager
- Hans Nerking as C.P. Engelmann, Frackverleiher

== Bibliography ==
- Bock, Hans-Michael; Bergfelder, Tim, eds. (2009). The Concise Cinegraph: Encyclopaedia of German Cinema. New York: Berghahn Books. ISBN 978-1-57181-655-9.
