= Margarethe Carl =

German opera singer

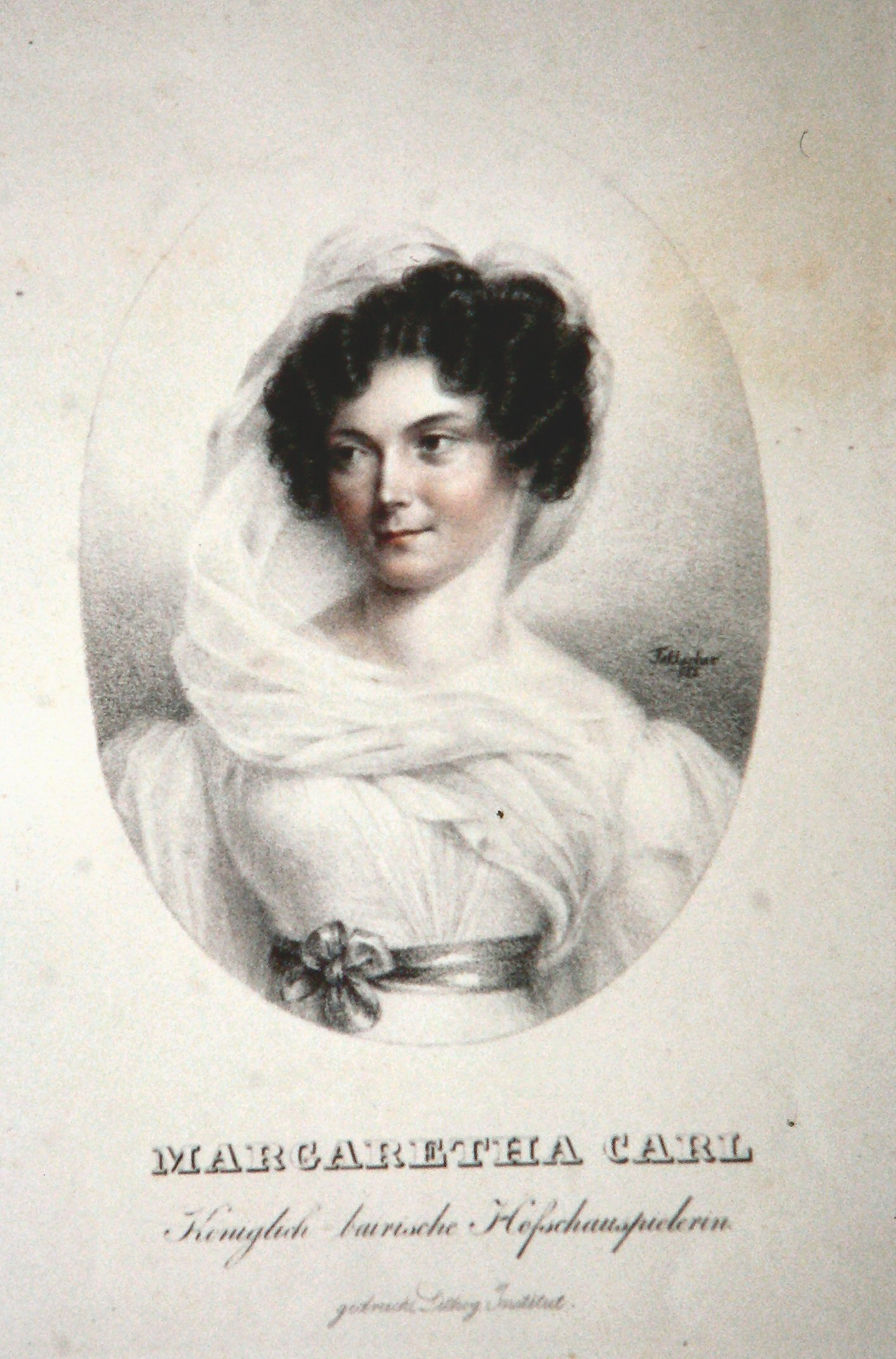
- Lithography by Josef Eduard Teltscher, 1826
- Born: Margarethe Lang; 10 September 1788; Munich, Electorate of Bavaria
- Died: 16 July 1861 (aged 72); Bad Ischl
- Other names: Margarethe Bernbrunn
- Occupations: Operatic soprano; Actress

Margarethe Carl was the stage name of Margarethe Bernbrunn (10 September 1788 – 16 July 1861), a German soprano and actress.

== Life ==
Born Margarethe Lang in Munich, in the Electorate of Bavaria, she was the daughter of horn player Martin Lang (1755–1819) and actress and opera singer Marianne Lang. She was trained as a soprano by Franz Danzi and was regarded as his best student. She made her debut in Munich in 1805 as Elvira in Peter von Winter's opera Das unterbrochene Opferfest. She moved in 1807 to the Staatstheater Stuttgart.

She met Carl Maria von Weber in 1809, who fell in love with her. She later appeared in Munich where she became a singer of the court opera. In 1824, she married actor and theatre director Karl Andreas Bernbrunn, who appeared on stage as Carl Carl. She died in Bad Ischl aged 72.

== Family ==
Her siblings were the violinist Theobald Lang (1783-1839), the bassoonist Franz Xaver Lang (1791-1862) and Josefa Lang (1791-1862). Her brother-in-law was the dancer and comedian Karl Flerx.

== Works ==
- Palmerin oder der Ritterschlag (Romantisches Schauspiel in 3 Akten, frei nach dem Französischen; 1825)
- Das Irrenhaus zu Dijon, oder: Wahnsinn und Verbrechen (Schauspiel in 3 Akten, frei nach dem Französischen; 1831)
- Die rächende Maske (Schauspiel in 4 Akten; 1832)
- Der Bergkönig, oder: Hopsa, der Retter aus Zauberbanden (Zaubermärchen in 2 Akten mit Musik; 1832)
- Das Spielhaus zu Langenschwalbach, oder: Der Demant-Ring (Romantisches Schauspiel in 4 Akten; 1836)
- Der Reisewagen des Flüchtlings (Schauspiel in 4 Akten; 1837)
- Das Abenteuer in Venedig, oder: Der Teutsche in Moskau (Romantisches Schauspiel in 4 Akten, frei nach dem Französischen; 1838)
- Herr und Diener, oder: Das geheimnisvolle Haus (Schauspiel in 5 Akten, frei nach dem Französischen; 1839)
- Die drei gefahrvollen Nächte, oder: Der Sklavenmarkt in Saint-Pierre (Schauspiel in 6 Abteilungen, frei nach dem Französischen; 1840)
- Die Gabe, für sich einzunehmen, oder: Artour de Montpensier (Vaudeville in 3 Akten, frei nach dem Französischen; 1843)

== Literature ==
- Elisabeth Friedrichs: Die deutschsprachigen Schriftstellerinnen des 18. und 19. Jahrhunderts. Metzler. Ein Lexikon. Metzler, Stuttgart 1981, ISBN 3-476-00456-2, p 23.
- Susanne Kord: Ein Blick hinter die Kulissen. Deutschsprachige Dramatikerinnen im 18. und 19. Jahrhundert. Metzler, Stuttgart 1992, ISBN 3-476-00835-5, p 333f.
- Joseph Kürschner (1883). "Lang, Ferdinand". Allgemeine Deutsche Biographie (in German). Vol. 17. Leipzig: Duncker & Humblot. pp. 596–598.
- W. Edgar Yates: Briefe des Theaterdirektors Carl Carl und seiner Frau Margarethe Carl an Charlotte Birch-Pfeiffer, 2004)
- W. Edgar Yates: "Die talentvolle Gattin des Directors". Margarethe Carl zwischen Hugo und Vaudeville. Mit einem unveröffentlichten Brief Margaretha Carls. In Nestroyana. Blätter der Internationalen Nestroy-Gesellschaft 28, 2008, 3/4, ISSN 1027-3921, .
