= Hansi Niese =

Austrian actress (1875–1934)

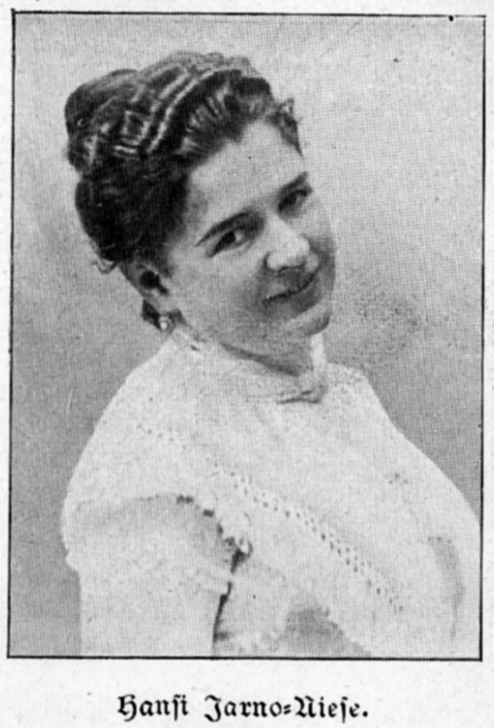
- Hansi Niese, around 1900
- Born: Johanna Niese; 10 November 1875; Vienna, Austria-Hungary (now Austria)
- Died: 4 April 1934 (aged 58); Vienna, Austria
- Burial place: Vienna Central Cemetery
- Other name: Johanna Jarno-Niese
- Occupations: Actress, singer
- Years active: 1886–1932
- Spouse: Josef Jarno (1899–1932)

Johanna Jarno-Niese (10 November 1875 in Vienna – 4 April 1934; née Johanna Niese), commonly known as Hansi Niese, was an Austrian actress and operetta singer (soprano).

== Career ==
Hansi Niese made her debut on stage for the first time in 1886 in a bar in Speising, near Vienna. At the age of 18 in 1891, she appeared in the South Moravian town of Znojmo at the local theater. In her youth, Niese worked alongside actress Berta Türk. Her success story began in 1893 at the Vienna Raimund Theater, where she appeared in the series for six years as a soubrette. In 1899, she moved to the theater an der Josefstadt. Soon after, she married Josef Jarno, the director of this theater.

Not only at the various stages of Vienna, but also on tour in Berlin Niese has starred in numerous plays by including Ludwig Anzengruber, Gerhart Hauptmann, Ferenc Molnár, Johann Nestroy, Ferdinand Raimund and Arthur Schnitzler. She also appeared in several farces and operettas (around 1907 as "Försterchristl" in the eponymous operetta with her brother Georg Jarno) and often as a partner of Alexander Girardi.

In the thirties, Niese starred in several films, including 1931 in "An Affair" and 1932 in "Hussars love."

== Personal life ==
She was married to actor Josef Jarno. After his death in 1932, she was saddled with his debts and, as a result, took on a more frugal lifestyle.

== Death and legacy ==
Niese died on 4 April 1934 in Vienna.

At Vienna's Central Cemetery (group 14 C, number 4), the popular actress has a dedicated memorial grave. In 1935, in Vienna in the 19th Döbling the Hansi Niese Alley and in 1955, in the 13 District of Vienna named the Hansi Niese-way to her. There is a statue of her outside the Volkstheater, Vienna.

== Filmography ==
- Frau Gertraud Namenlos (1914)
- Grandstand for General Staff (1926)
- Storm in a Water Glass (1931)
- Purpur und Waschblau (1931)
- Die große Liebe (1931)
- Ein süßes Geheimnis (1932)
- Mrs. Lehmann's Daughters (1932)
- Husarenliebe (1932)
- Hochzeit am Wolfgangsee (1933)
- The Emperor's Waltz (1933)
- Our Emperor (1933)
- Police Report (1934)
- The Big Chance (1934)
- Die Töchter ihrer Exzellenz (1934)
