= Karl Treumann =

Austrian opera singer

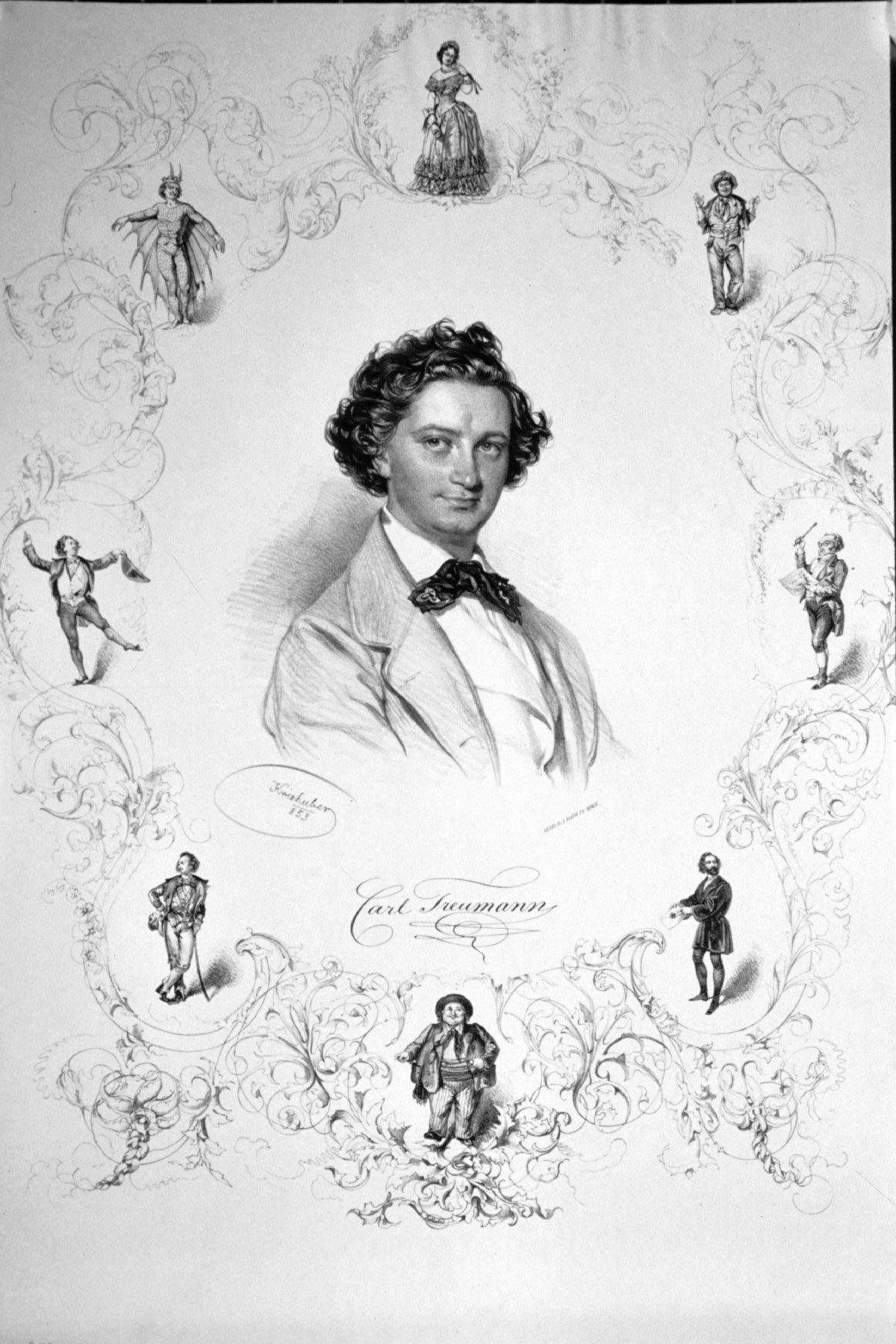
Karl Treumann, lithography by Josef Kriehuber, 1853

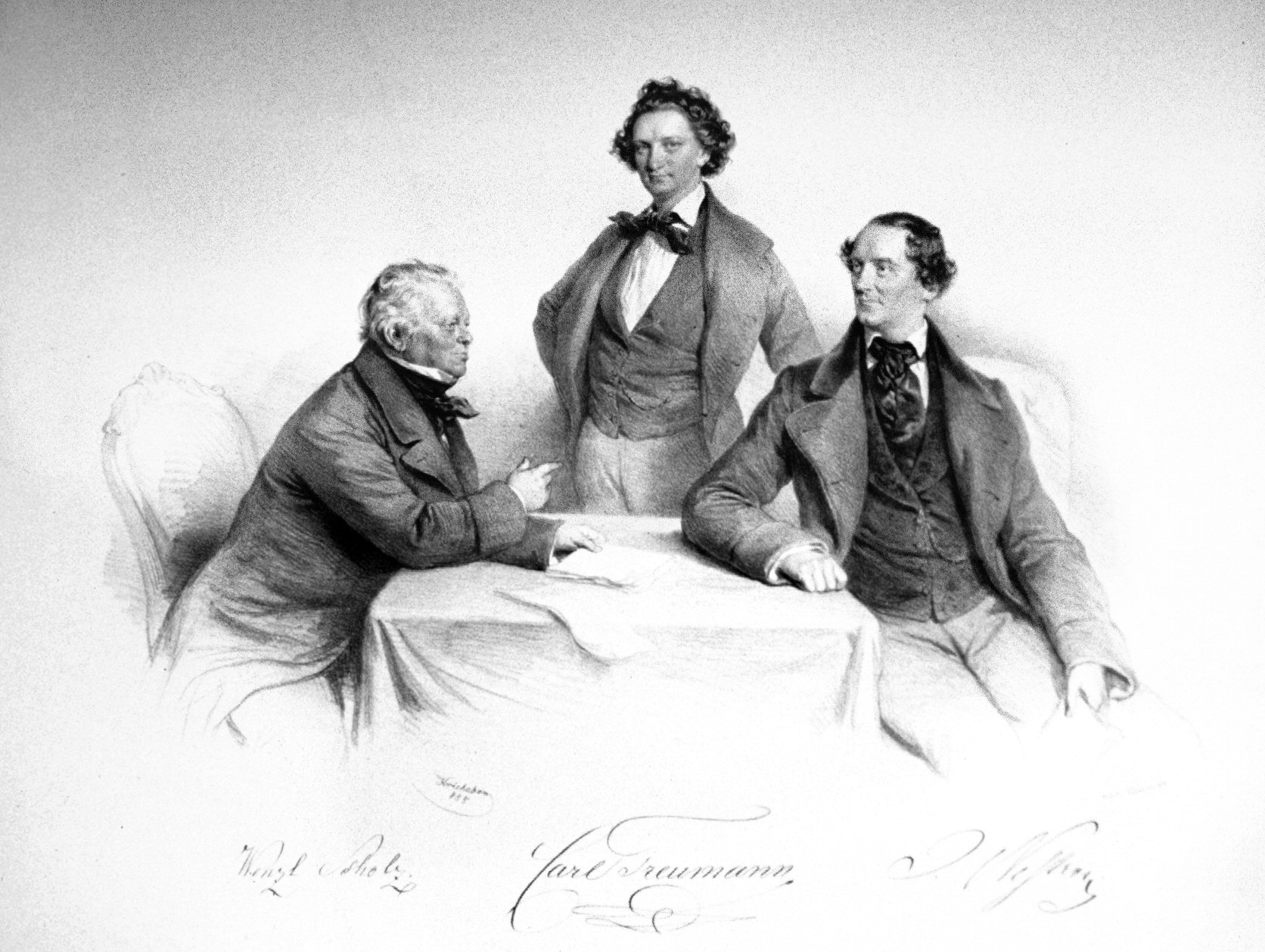
Karl Treumann with Wenzel Scholz and Johann Nestroy, Lithography by Josef Kriehuber, 1855

Matthias Karl Ludwig Treumann (27 July 1823 – 18 April 1877) was an Austrian actor, operetta singer (tenor), theatre director and writer.

== Life ==
After an apprenticeship as a printer in his native Hamburg in 1841, he went to the German Theatre in Pest, where his brothers were already active. In order to avoid conscription for military service in Hamburg, he joined a touring theatre troupe in Transylvania. From 1843 to 1845 he worked again in Pest. 1847 he was engaged on the recommendation of Franz von Suppé for the Theater an der Wien.

In 1852 he moved to the Carltheater in Vienna, which was under the direction of Carl Carl, where he appeared with Johann Nestroy and Wenzel Scholz. At first Nestroy was displeased by the engagement of Treumann, because he saw his position endangered by him. But soon there was an excellent understanding between Nestroy, Treumann and Scholz. Treumann was known for his talent for mimicry.

In 1860 he took over the management of the Carltheater. The triumphal success of Offenbach's Orpheus in the Underworld, in his adaptation with Nestroy as Jupiter laid the foundation for the development of the Viennese operetta. In order to escape the high lease of the new owners of the Carltheater, at which Nestroy had already failed as director, in 1860 Treumann founded the Theater am Franz-Josefs-Kai ("Kaitheater" or "Treumann-Theater"), which he managed until its destruction by a fire in 1863. From 1863 to 1866 he was director of the Carltheater again.

Treumann undertook many tours to Hamburg, Berlin, Prague, Lemberg, Budapest and Brno, and in this way acquired a significant fortune. He also gained a reputation as a translator of operetta texts (for works by Offenbach). He also wrote the libretto for the operetta Prinz Methusalem for Johann Strauss II.

Treumann, whose wife Maria had died in 1862, died of a stroke in the morning hours of 18 April 1877 in Baden bei Wien.

== Bibliography ==
- Ludwig Eisenberg: Großes biographisches Lexikon der Deutschen Bühne im XIX. Jahrhundert. Edition by Paul List, Leipzig 1903, p. 1048 f.
- Hermann Arthur Lier [in German] (1894). "Treumann, Karl" . Allgemeine Deutsche Biographie (in German). Vol. 38. Leipzig: Duncker & Humblot. pp. 584–585.
- Constantin von Wurzbach: Treumann, Karl. In: Biographisches Lexikon des Kaiserthums Oesterreich. 47. Theil. Kaiserlich-königliche Hof- und Staatsdruckerei, Wien 1883, p. 172–178
- Christian Fastl: Treumann, Karl. In: Oesterreichisches Musiklexikon. Online-Ausgabe, Vienna 2002 ff., ISBN 3-7001-3077-5; Druckausgabe: volume 5, edition of the Austrian Academy of Sciences, Vienna 2006, ISBN 3-7001-3067-8
