= Das Spitzentuch der Königin =

1880 operetta by Johann Strauss II

Illustration of the operetta in the Austrian magazine Die Bombe (1880)

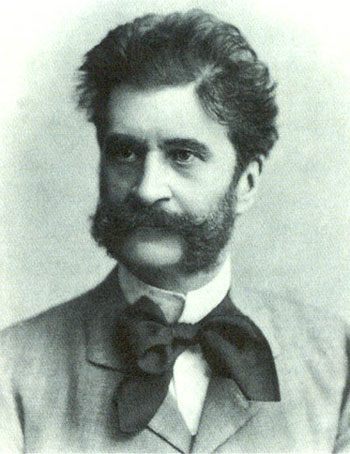
Johann Strauss II

Das Spitzentuch der Königin (The Queen's Lace Handkerchief) is an operetta by Johann Strauss II. The libretto was by Heinrich Bohrmann-Riegen and Richard Genée and is about the Spanish writer Cervantes. Although the operetta is supposedly based on a fictitious incident in the court of Portugal in the 1500s, in fact "it's a send-up of the court of the Austro-Hungarian Emperor Franz Joseph I, with the young king in the story representing Crown Prince Rudolf, 19 years of age at the time, whose death nine years later was one of the big Habsburg family tragedies".

== Performance history ==
It was first performed on 1 October 1880 in Vienna at the Theater an der Wien under the composer's direction by Therese Braunecker-Schäfer, Alexander Girardi, Eugenie Erdösy, Karoline Tellheim, Hermine Meyerhoff, Felix Schweighofer and Ferdinand Schütz. The piece was adapted for Broadway in 1882, with some additional songs by Solomon and Stephens, and (once the new Casino Theatre solved its mechanical problems) ran successfully for 130 performances.

The work is rather obscure nowadays, but the waltz "Rosen aus dem Süden" (Roses from the South), which incorporates melodies from the operetta, is well known. A revised version by Erich Wolfgang Korngold under the title Das Lied der Liebe (The Song of Love) was premiered in Berlin on 23 December 1931 with Richard Tauber and Anny Ahlers in leading roles.

There was a revival at the Theater an der Wien in January 2025 to mark the start of Strauss's 200th birth anniversary year, with Diana Haller as the King, Maximilian Mayer as Cervantes and Michael Laurenz as Villalobos, conducted by Martynas Stakionis.

== Roles ==
Role	Voice type	Premiere cast, 1 October 1880 Conductor: Johann Strauss II
Cervantes	baritone	Felix Schweighofer
The King of Portugal	mezzo-soprano	Therese Braunecker-Schäfer
The Queen	soprano	Eugenie Erdösy
Don Sancho d'Avellaneday Villapinquedones	tenor	Alexander Girardi
Donna Irene, confidant of the Queen	soprano	
Count Villalobos y Rodriguez	bass	
Marquis de la Mancha y Villareal	baritone	
Chorus

== Plot summary ==
It is 1580 and the king of Portugal is unable to govern, too busy with extramarital flirting and the attractions of fine food and wine, relying instead on the powerful count Villalobos. When Cervantes makes fun of the count in a song, he is arrested. However, the king has him released because his wife likes his writing. The queen has fallen in love with the poet and sends him a lace handkerchief with the compromising phrase "The Queen loves you, but you are not the King".

When Villalobos finds the handkerchief, fallen from the poet's pocket, he hurries to the king, who instantly believes that the queen is having an affair. He forbids Cervantes to be near his wife and further, sends her to a convent. Cervantes later finds himself in a tavern near the convent. When he hears all that has occurred, he plans to get the royal couple back together, and with friends disguised as thieves, abducts the queen back to the palace. They find the king at ease, and dressed as a servant-girl, the queen takes him his favourite dish. He recognizes her; Cervantes tells the king a story to make him forgive his wife, and all ends with rejoicing.

== Recordings ==
2008: Nadja Stefanoff, Jessica Glatte, Elke Kottmair, Ralf Simon, Markus Liske, Hary Brachmann, Gritt Gnauck; Staatsoperette Dresden, conductor Ernst Theis; cpo 777 406-2
