= Prinz Methusalem =

1877 operetta written by Johann Strauss II

Illustration from the 1877 premiere (Die Bombe magazine)

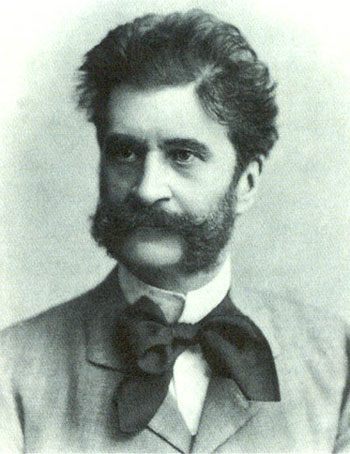
Johann Strauss II

Prinz Methusalem (Prince Methusalem) is an operetta written by Johann Strauss II to a libretto by Karl Treumann, after Victor Wilder and Alfred Delacour. It was first performed on January 3, 1877 in Vienna at the Carltheater. It achieved a run of eighty performances. The pot-pourri overture incorporates themes from the operetta, as well as other material that might have sometime been part of the planned score.

== Roles ==
Role	Voice type	Premiere cast, 3 January 1877 (Conductor: Johann Strauss II)
Herzog von Rikarak	bass	Josef Matras
Prinz Methusalem	mezzo-soprano / tenor-baritone	Antonie Link
Pulcinella	soprano	Caroline Finaly
Sigismund	baritone	Wilhelm Knaack
Sophistica	mezzo-soprano	Therese Braunecker-Schäfer
