= Auguste Groner =

19th-century Austrian mystery and detective writer

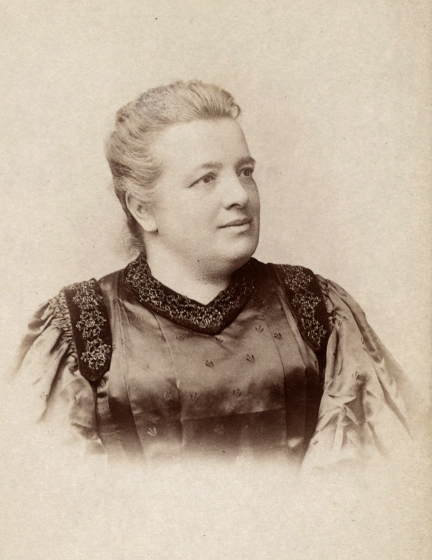
- Auguste Groner
- Born: Auguste Kopallik; 16 April 1850; Vienna, Austria
- Died: 7 March 1929 (aged 78); Vienna, Austria
- Occupations: Novelist, short story writer
- Writing career
- Pen name: Olaf Björnson, A. of the Paura, Renorga, Metis
- Genres: Murder mystery, crime fiction, detective

Auguste Groner (née Kopallik; 16 April 1850 − 7 March 1929), was an Austrian writer internationally notable for detective fiction. She also published under the pseudonyms Olaf Björnson, A. of the Paura, Renorga, and Metis.

== Life ==
Auguste Groner was born in Vienna in 1850, the daughter of an accountant. One of her brothers was the painter Franz Kopallik, and another was the theologian Josef Kopallik. She was educated in Vienna, both at the painting school at the Museum of Applied Arts, Vienna and at the Vienna woman's teacher training institute. From 1876 to 1905 she worked as a primary school teacher in Vienna. In 1879 she married Richard Groner, a journalist and lexicographer. Around 1882 she began writing, initially juvenile fiction and historical fiction. Around 1890, she turned to crime fiction, creating the first serial police detective in German crime literature, Joseph Müller, who appears for the first time in the novella The Case of the Pocket Diary Found in the Snow, which was published in 1890. Outside of Austria, she is most known for her crime stories.

== Selected works ==
- Joseph Müller novels and stories:
  - The Secret of New Year's Eve (novella) 1890, (Translated also as The Case of the Pocket Diary Found in the Snow)
  - The Golden Bullet (novella) 1892, (Translated also as The Case of the Golden Bullet)
  - Who is it? (short story) 1894
  - How I Was Murdered (novella) 1895, (Translated also as The Case of the Registered Letter)
  - The Confessional Secret (novella) 1897
  - The old gentleman (novella) 1898
  - Why she extinguished the light (novel) 1899, (Translated also as The Case of the Lamp That Went Out)
  - The Pharaoh's Bracelet (novel) 1900
  - The House in the Shadow (novella) 1902
  - The Blue Lady (novel) 1905, (Translated as The Lady in Blue, 1922)
  - Lush Grass (short story) 1905
  - The man with the many names (novel) 1906
  - The Black Cord (novel) 1908, (Translated as The Man with the Black Cord, 1911)
  - The Red Mercury (novel) 1910
  - The Cross of the Welser (novel) 1912
  - The Secret of the Hermitage (novel) 1916
  - The Pentagram (novella) 1916
  - The Wandering Light (novel) 1922

== Bibliography ==
- Auguste Groner (1959). In Österreichisches Biographisches Lexikon 1815–1950. Volume 2, Verlag der Österreichischen Akademie der Wissenschaften, Wien, page. 72.
- Kramlovsky, Beatrix. (2011). Show Your Face, oh Violence: Crime Fiction as Written by Austrian Women Writers. World Literature Today Vol. 85, No. 3: 13–15.
- Lindenstruth, Gerhard. (1992). Auguste Groner (1850–1929), eine illustrierte Bibliographie, Selbstverlag, Gießen
- Tannert, Mary. (1992). Auguste Groner's Mystery and Detective Fiction. University of Tennessee (doctoral dissertation under the supervision of Henry Kratz).
