= Felix Czeike =

Austrian historian and educator

Felix Czeike (21 August 1926 – 23 April 2006) was an Austrian historian and popular educator. He was an author and partly also editor of numerous publications on the history of Vienna and was the director of the Wiener Stadt- und Landesarchiv. His main work is the six-volume Historische Lexikon Wien.

== Life ==
Czeike, born in Favoriten (10th district of Vienna), studied history, geography, German studies and art history at the University of Vienna and received his doctorate in philosophy in 1950. From 1954 he worked in the Vienna City and State Archives, and in 1976 took over their management, which he held until his retirement in 1989. In 1977 he founded the Vienna branch of the Ludwig Boltzmann Gesellschaft for urban history research, which was integrated into the City and State archives, and which he headed until his death. From 1993 to 2003 he was president of the Verein für Geschichte der Stadt Wien. In 1979 he was appointed associate professor at the University of Vienna, and in 1985 was awarded the title Hofrat by the Federal President.

Even after his retirement, Czeike devoted himself to the history of Vienna. His main work is the six-volume Historische Lexikon Wien published from 1992 to 2004 with about 3,700 pages and 30,000 keywords, which is regarded as the standard work concerning the history of Vienna and is usually simply called der Czeike by experts. The Große Groner Wien Lexikon, published by Czeike in 1974, can be regarded as a preliminary stage. Its topographical part goes back to Richard Groner's "Vienna as it was" (later edited by Otto Erich Deutsch) and Ernestine Krug collaborated on its biographical part. Czeike was supported in the creation of the Historisches Lexikon Wien by the collaboration of his wife Helga, who is also mentioned as co-author in some of his other books. In addition, he called on the human resources of the Vienna City and Provincial Archives and employed a team of experts with whom he had accumulated specialized knowledge about Vienna.

The encyclopedia was made available online in 2014 by the City of Vienna as a digitalised version and at the same time served as a database for the Vienna History Wiki.

On 23 April 2006, Czeike died unexpectedly during a stay in Merano. He is buried in an honorary grave in the Hietzing Cemetery (group 14, number 23).

His life's work includes numerous books and hundreds of other publications dealing mainly with the history of Vienna.

== Awards ==
- 1986: Ehrenzeichen für Verdienste um das Land Wien
- 1990: Austrian Decoration for Science and Art
- 1993: Ehrenzeichen des Landes Oberösterreich
- 1994: Decoration of Honour for Services to the Republic of Austria.
- 1996: Ehrenmedaille der Bundeshauptstadt Wien
- 2002: Preis der Stadt Wien für Volksbildung

== Publications (selection) ==
- Ernestine Krug, Felix Czeike (editor): Das große Groner Wien Lexikon, Molden, Wien 1974, ISBN 3-217-00293-8 (The basis for the topographical part was the work of Richard Groner and Felix Czeike: Wien wie es war, Molden, Vienna1965.)
- Wien und seine Bürgermeister. 7 Jahrhunderte Wiener Stadtgeschichte, Vienna 1974.
- Die Kärntner Straße, Vienna 1975.
- Wien. Kunst- u. Kultur-Lexikon, Munich 1976.
- Unbekanntes Wien. 1870–1920, Lucerne 1979.
- Geschichte der Stadt Wien, Molden, Vienna / Munich / Zürich 1981, 1984, ISBN 3-217-00630-5.
- Das Dorotheum. Vom Versatz- und Fragamt zum modernen Auktionshaus. Jugend und Volk, Vienna / Munich 1982, ISBN 3-224-16009-8 / ISBN 3-224-10450-3.
- Wiener Bezirkskulturführer: I. Innere Stadt. Jugend und Volk, Vienna/Munich 1983, ISBN 3-224-16246-5.
- Wien. Geschichte in Bilddokumenten, Beck, Munich 1984, ISBN 3-406-09584-4.
- Historisches Lexikon Wien. Volume 1–5 [und Ergänzungsband], Kremayr & Scheriau, Vienna 1992–2004, ISBN 3-218-00543-4 / ISBN 3-218-00544-2 / ISBN 3-218-00545-0 / ISBN 3-218-00546-9 / ISBN 3-218-00547-7 / ISBN 978-3-218-00741-2 (additional volume 2004).
  - Historisches Lexikon Wien. 6 volumes, 2., updated and extended edition 2004, ISBN 978-3-218-00740-5. (Online bei Wienbibliothek)
- Wien. Kunst, Kultur und Geschichte der Donaumetropole. DuMont, Cologne 1999, ISBN 3-7701-4348-5.
