= Josef Jarno =

Austrian actor and theatre director (1866–1932)

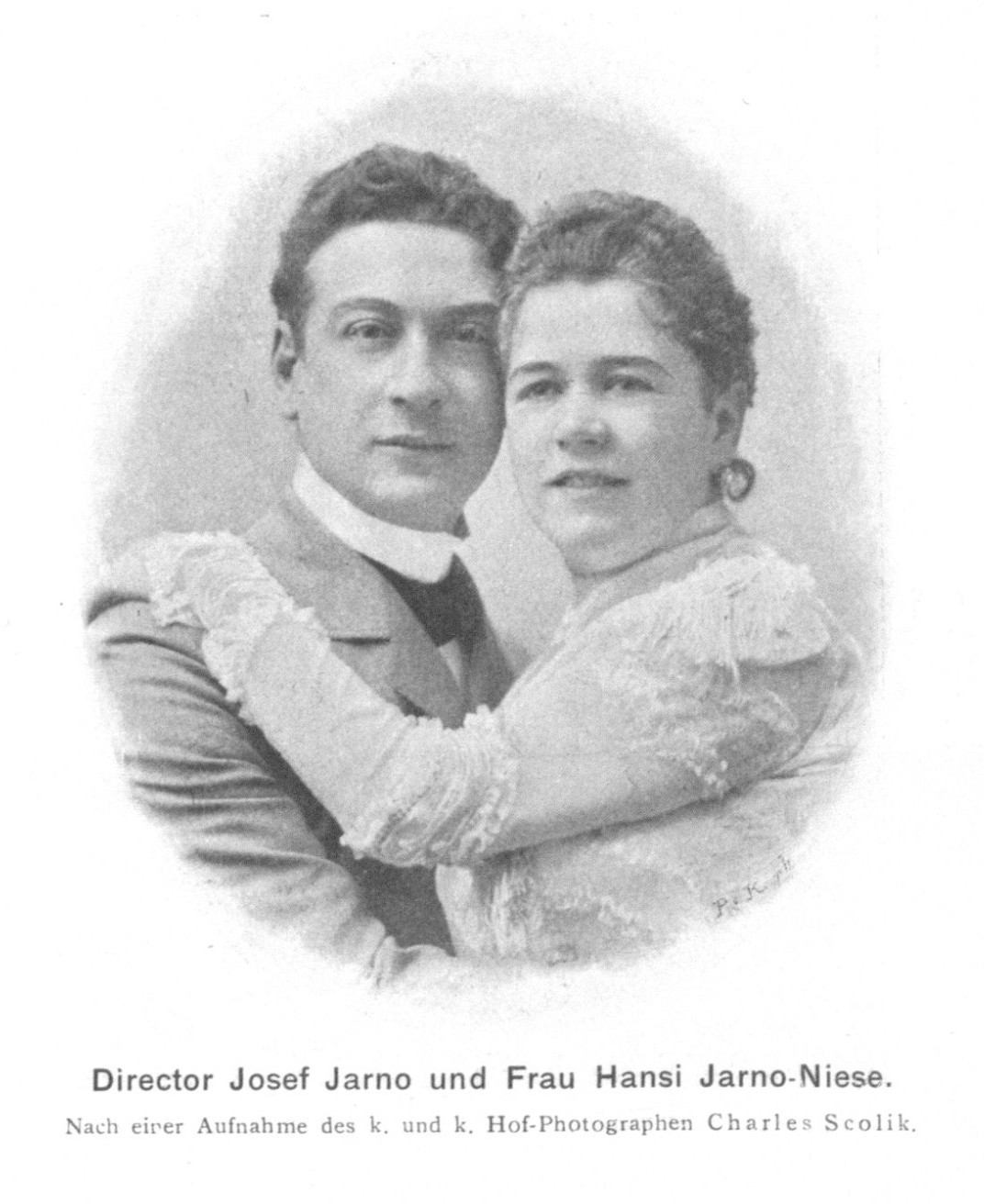
Josef Jarno with his wife Hansi Jarno-Niese, 1900

Josef Jarno (24 August 1866 died 11 January 1932) was an Austrian actor and theatre director. He was the older brother of opera composer Georg Jarno.

== Life ==
Jarno was born in Pest, Hungary, and made his debut in the Lehártheater in Bad Ischl, Upper Austria. He visited the place every summer for the following 14 years.

In 1897 a summer theatre was initiated in Bad Aussee, with Jarno as its first director. Two years later he gave up the job and moved to Vienna to take over as the leader of the Theater in der Josefstadt. In Vienna, Jarno could carry out his ideas about modern drama. He brought plays by Henrik Ibsen, August Strindberg, Arthur Schnitzler and George Bernard Shaw onto the stage. Jarno worked in Vienna until 1923. During this time, he married the actress Johanna Niese.

The German-language premiere of Ferenc Molnár's suburban legend Liliom (1913) featured Jarno in the title role and made the play a worldwide success.

In 1905, Jarno bought the Fürst-Theater and lead it in parallel with the Theater in der Josefstadt. In 1926 he assumed leadership of the Renaissance-Bühne theatre in Vienna.

Jarno died in Vienna and is buried in the Zentralfriedhof.

== Personal life ==
He was married to Hansi Niese.
