= Anton M. Storch =

Austrian composer

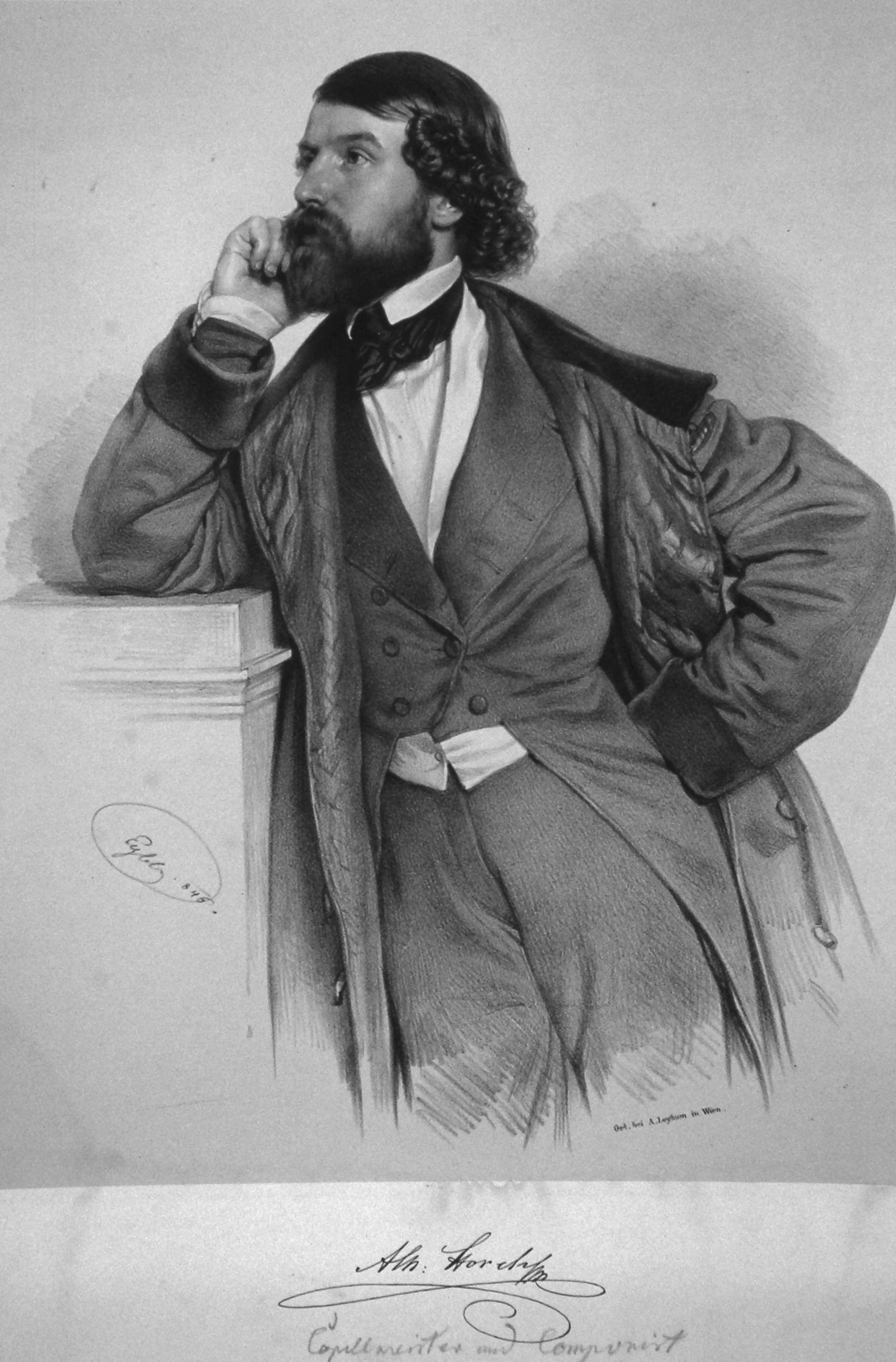
Anton (M.) Storch, lithograph by Franz Eybl, 1846

Anton M. Storch, Anton M. Storch, for/also: Anton Michael Storch or Anton Maria Storch or Anton Monachus Storch or Anton Max Storch or Anton Martin Storch, (baptized 23 December 1813 – 31 December 1887) was an Austrian composer and choral director.

== Life ==
Born in Vienna, Storch received lessons from the music teacher Michael Eckel and studied at the Conservatory of the Society of Friends of Music (today University of Music and Performing Arts Vienna).

Storch was choir director of the Wiener Männergesang-Verein, the Linzer Singakademie and the Niederösterreichischer Sängerbund, as well as orchestra director at the Theater an der Wien and the Theater in der Josefstadt.

His son Anton Storch (25 December 1843 in Vienna – 19 April 1873 idem) followed in his father's footsteps as Kapellmeister and composer.

M. Storch died in Vienna at the age of 74. His Ehrengrab (grave of honour) is located on the Vienna Central Cemetery (Group 0, row 1, number 11).
