= Johann Baptist Klerr =

Austrian kapellmeister and composer

Johann Baptist Klerr (15 July 1830 – 27 September 1875) was an Austrian Kapellmeister and composer.

== Life ==
Born in Baden bei Wien, Klerr was the younger brother of Ludwig Klerr. In 1848 Klerr got an engagement as a musician at the Schauspielhaus Graz and from there he later went to the city theatre in Bratislava in the same function. From 1856 he worked as a conductor at the Sopron theatre and occasionally worked there with his brother Ludwig.

The next stages were Wiener Neustadt, Baden and after a short guest performance in 1858 in Kraków, Klerr was signed on in Budapest. In 1862 he was engaged as Kapellmeister at the Carltheater in Vienna and worked there until 1867 among others also with Franz von Suppé.

In 1867, Klerr moved to the Theater an der Wien, also as Kapellmeister. Between 1868 and 1872 and again from 1874 to 1875 Klerr brought together the venues of Baden and Wiener Neustadt as musical director.

Klerr died at the age of 45 in Baden, where he also found his final resting place.

== Work ==
- Die Nixe, Opera.
- Die schöne Müllerin, Opera.
- Der Gang nach dem Eisenhammer (music to the ballad of the same name by Friedrich Schiller).
- Der kleine Josi : komisches Singspiel in einem Akte.
