= Ernst Theis =

Austrian conductor (born 1961)

Ernst Theis (born 31 July 1961) is an Austrian conductor. From 2003 to 2013 he was chief conductor of the Staatsoperette Dresden.

Theis was born in Sierning, the son of Georg and Gertrude Theis. He took trumpet and drum-like instrument lessons at the University of Music and Performing Arts Vienna under conducting guidance from Otmar Suitner and Peter Keyshing. On 5 January 1989 he made his first public appearance with the Vienna Chamber Orchestra and then conducted with such Austrian orchestras as the Vienna Radio Symphony Orchestra, Vienna Philharmonic and Vienna Symphony. He also was a conductor of German orchestras such as North German Radio Symphony Orchestra and Hamburger Symphoniker as well as various international ones such as Saint Petersburg Symphony Orchestra, and Slovak Philharmonic. On 16 March 2013 he performed Ludwig van Beethoven's Seventh and Eight symphonies with Symphony Orchestra of Tatarstan in Kazan, Russia and the same month received an invitation from the Weill Festival in Dessau.
