= Johann Hoffmann (theatre manager) =

Austrian theatre manager

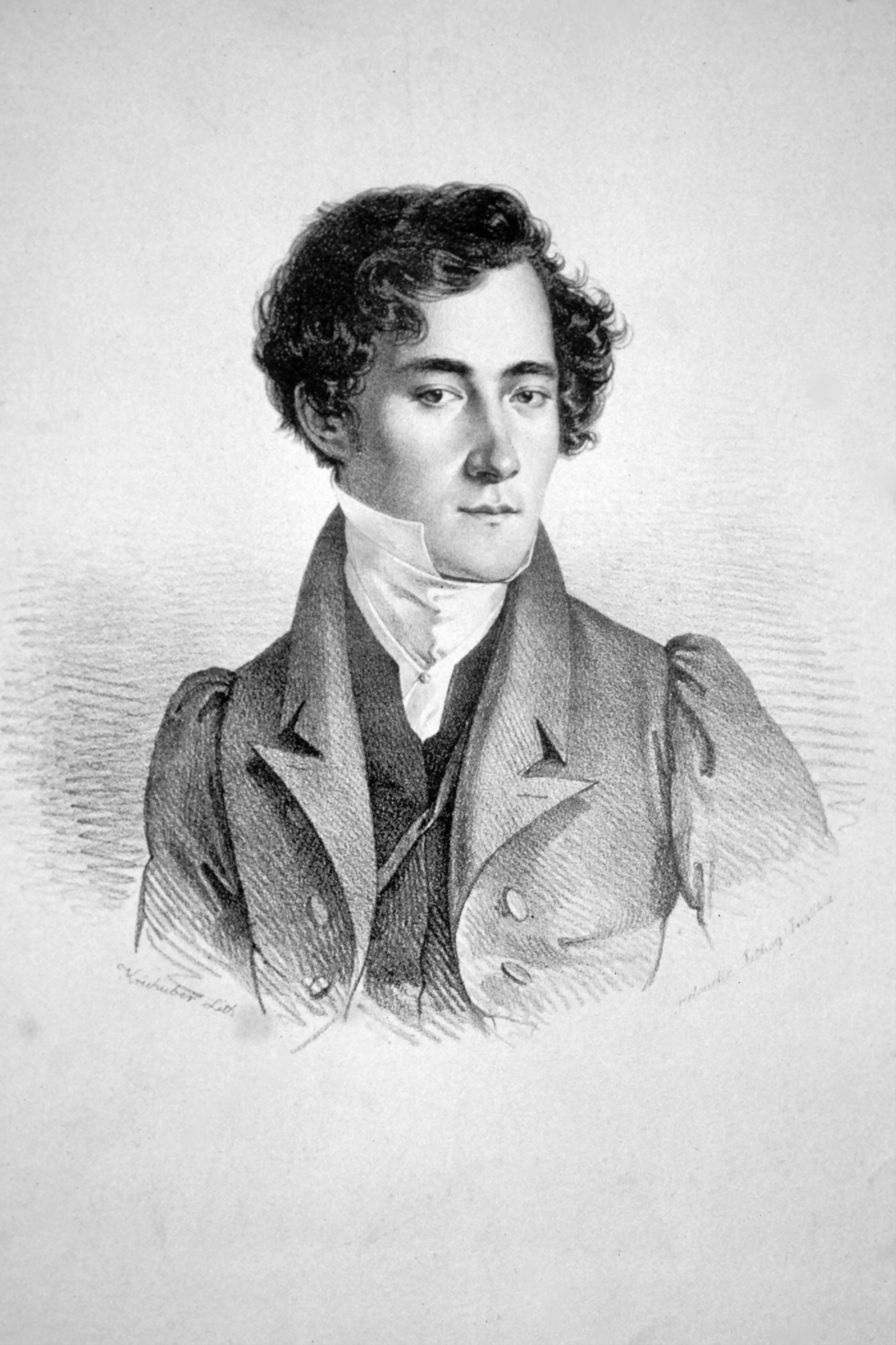
- Lithograph by Josef Kriehuber (1828)
- Born: Vienna
- Died: 13 September 1865 (aged 60); Vienna
- Occupations: operatic tenor; theatre manager
- Parent: Franz Hoffmann

Johann Hoffmann (22 May 1805 – 13 September 1865) was an Austrian operatic tenor and theatre manager. He performed in Vienna, Germany, and elsewhere, and later acquired the Theater in der Josefstadt in Vienna.

== Life ==
He was born in Vienna, his father Franz Hoffmann was a clerk of the lower law court of Erdberg, a city district. From 1820 he was employed by the magistrate of Vienna. His singing talent had meanwhile already been noted, and he took singing lessons from the brother of the dancer Fanny Elssler and also studied with Joseph Weigl and Heinrich Anschütz. In 1826, Louis Duport engaged him at the Vienna Court Opera, where he took the lead role in Der Klausner am wüsten Berge by Caraffa.

During the following years, Hoffmann performed in Germany and elsewhere, sometimes taking over as theatre manager. He appeared in Aachen in 1828, and in 1829 at the Court Opera, Berlin, until 1835. From that year he appeared in St Petersburg, where he was manager from 1836. In 1838 he went to Riga, where from 1839 to 1844 he was manager. From 1846 he was manager in Prague until 1852. From 1852 he was at the state theatre in Frankfurt am Main.

=== Theatre owner in Vienna ===
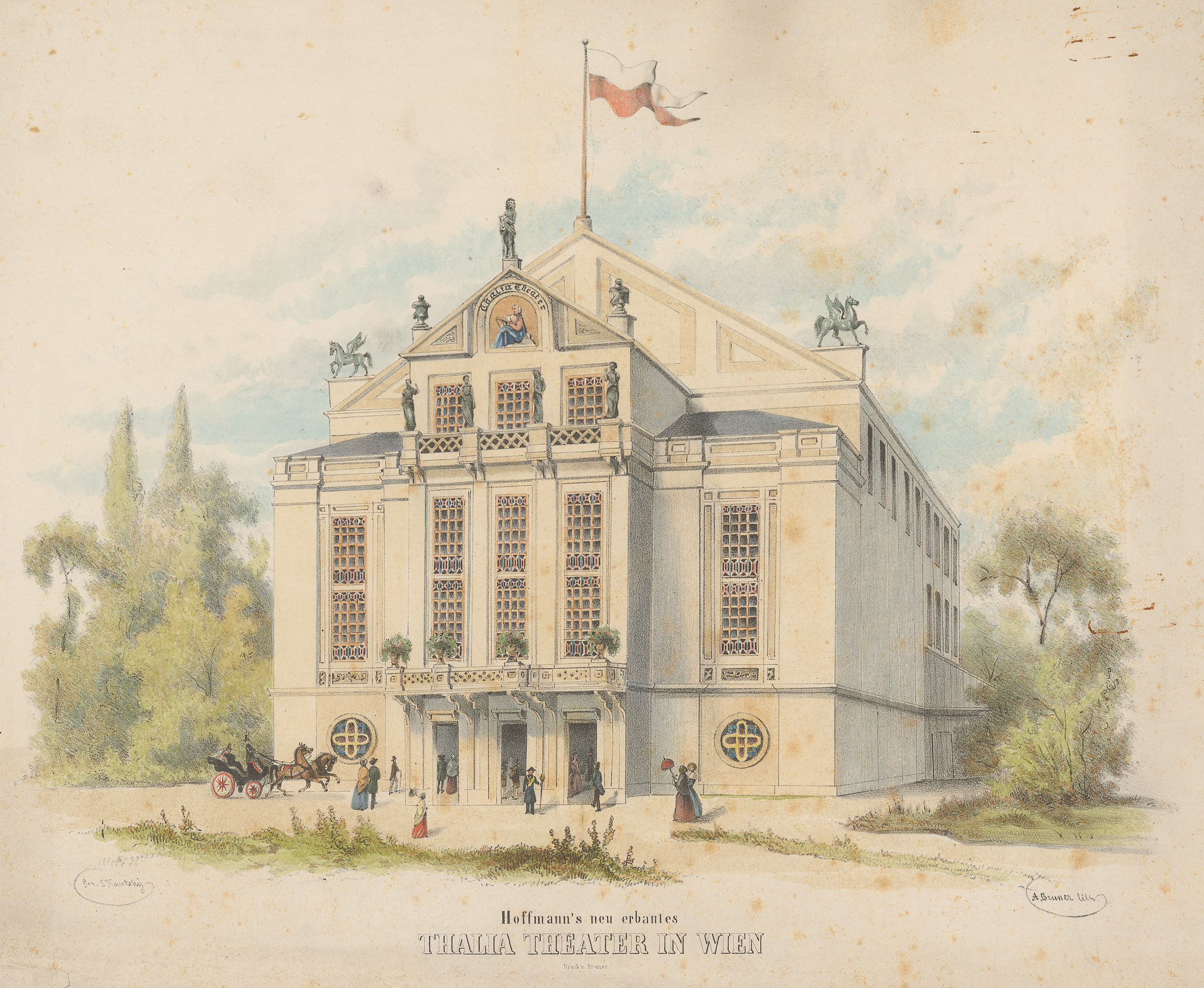
Thalia Theatre in Vienna, built by Hoffmann in 1856

Hoffmann returned to Vienna in 1855, and acquired the Theater in der Josefstadt; the first work staged under his management was the play L'Honneur et l'argent by François Ponsard. Operas, and Volksstücke by Alois Berla and others, were staged. In 1856 he built the Thalia Theatre, which he also managed; the Thalia Theatre staged works including Weber's Der Freischütz and the Zauberspiel Der Verschwender by Ferdinand Raimund. Hoffmann suffered financial losses and withdrew from the management of both theatres in 1865. He died that year in Vienna.

== Singing roles ==
Before entering the stage, he was known for his interpretation of songs by Schubert. Roles on stage included Simeon in Joseph by Étienne Méhul, Jacob in Die Schweizer Familie by Joseph Weigl, the title roles in Mozart's La clemenza di Tito, Weber's Oberon and Rossini's Otello, and Tamino in Mozart's The Magic Flute.

== Family ==
Hoffmann married in 1830 Katharina Krainz (1809–1857), an operatic soprano. She appeared at the Court Theatre in Berlin from 1829; they later appeared together in St Petersburg and Riga. Their daughter Johanna (1833–1877) was a singer. After Katharina's death, he married in Prague Marie Baumeister (1819–1887), sister of the actor Bernhard Baumeister.
