= Ludwig Eisenberg (writer) =

Austrian writer and encyclopedist (1858–1910)

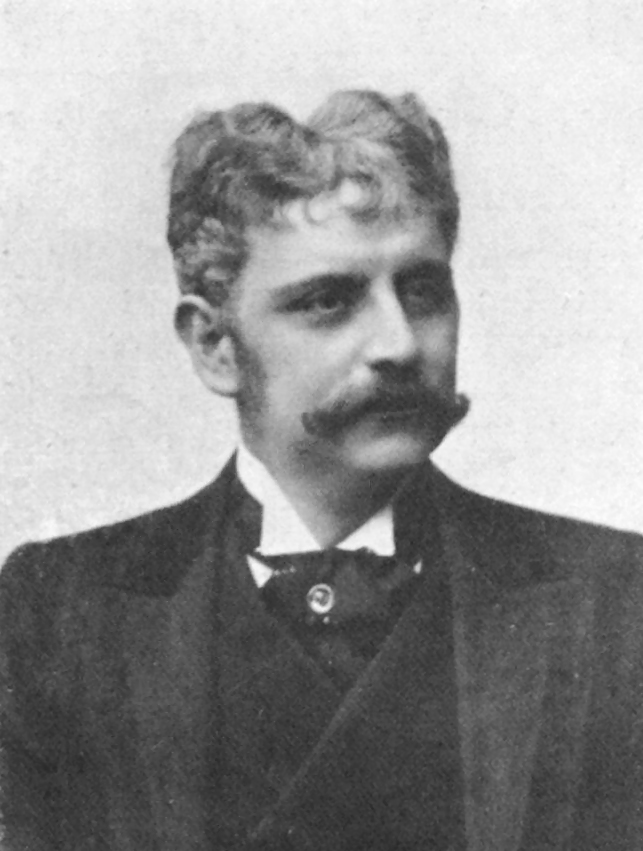
Ludwig Eisenberg

Ludwig Julius Eisenberg (5 March 1858 in Berlin, Kingdom of Prussia – 25 January 1910 in Vienna, Austria-Hungary) was an Austrian writer and encyclopedist. He wrote a lexicon of stage artists, among other publications.

== Publications ==
- Das geistige Wien ZDB-ID 1308834-8
  - (with Richard Groner) Volume 1, 1889 Das geistige Wien. Mittheilungen über die in Wien lebenden Architekten, Bildhauer, Bühnenkünstler, Graphiker, Journalisten, Maler, Musiker und Schriftsteller
  - (with Richard Groner) Volume 2, 1890 Das geistige Wien. Mittheilungen über die in Wien lebenden Architekten, Bildhauer, Bühnenkünstler, Graphiker, Journalisten, Maler, Musiker und Schriftsteller. Künstler- und Schriftsteller Lexikon
  - Volume 3, 1891 Künstler- und Schriftsteller-Lexikon Das geistige Wien. Mittheilungen über Wiener Architekten, Bildhauer, Bühnenkünstler, Graphiker, Journalisten, Maler, Musiker und Schriftsteller
  - Volume 4, 1892 "Supplementband" Künstler- und Schriftsteller-Lexikon Das geistige Wien. Mittheilungen über Wiener Architekten, Bildhauer, Bühnenkünstler, Graphiker, Journalisten, Maler, Musiker und Schriftsteller (Digitalisat)
  - Volume 5, 1893 Das geistige Wien
    - Vol. 1: Belletristisch-künstlerischer Theil. Mittheilungen über die in Wien lebenden Architekten, Bildhauer, Bühnenkünstler, Graphiker, Journalisten, Maler, Musiker und Schriftsteller
    - Vol. 2: Medicinisch-naturwissenschaftlicher Theil. Mittheilungen über Wiener Fachschriftsteller und Gelehrte auf dem Gebiete der Medicin (nebst Thierheilkunde und Pharmacie) und Naturwissenschaften (Digitalisat)
- Von der Strecke. Ernste und heitere Geschichten aus dem Eisenbahnleben. Brockhausen, Wien u. a. 1891.
- Johann Strauss. Ein Lebensbild. Breitkopf & Härtel, Leipzig 1894 (Digitalisat)
- Adolf von Sonnenthal. Eine Künstlerlaufbahn als Beitrag zur modernen Burgtheater-Geschichte. With a foreword by Ludwig Speidel. Pierson, Dresden 1896 (2nd, extended edition as Adolf Sonnenthal. Eine Künstlerlaufbahn. Als Beitrag zur Geschichte des modernen Burgtheaters. ebenda 1900) (Digitalisat)
- Ludwig Eisenberg's Großes Biographisches Lexikon der Deutschen Bühne im XIX. Jahrhundert. Verlag Paul List, Leipzig 1903 (Ludwig Eisenberg's großes biographisches Lexikon der deutschen Bühne im 19. Jahrhundert at the Internet Archive includes about 3.000 artist biographies)

== Sources ==
- Hermann Clemens Kosel (editor): Biographien der Wiener Künstler und Schriftsteller (Deutsch-österreichisches Künstler- und Schriftsteller-Lexikon. vol. 1). Gesellschaft für Graphische Industrie, Vienna 1902.
- N.N.: Ludwig Eisenberg. In Walther Killy (editor): Deutsche Biographische Enzyklopädie (DBE). 1st edition. Vol. 3: Ebinger–Gierke. K.G. Saur, Munich 1996, ISBN 3-598-23163-6.
