= Carl Carl =

Polish actor and theatre director

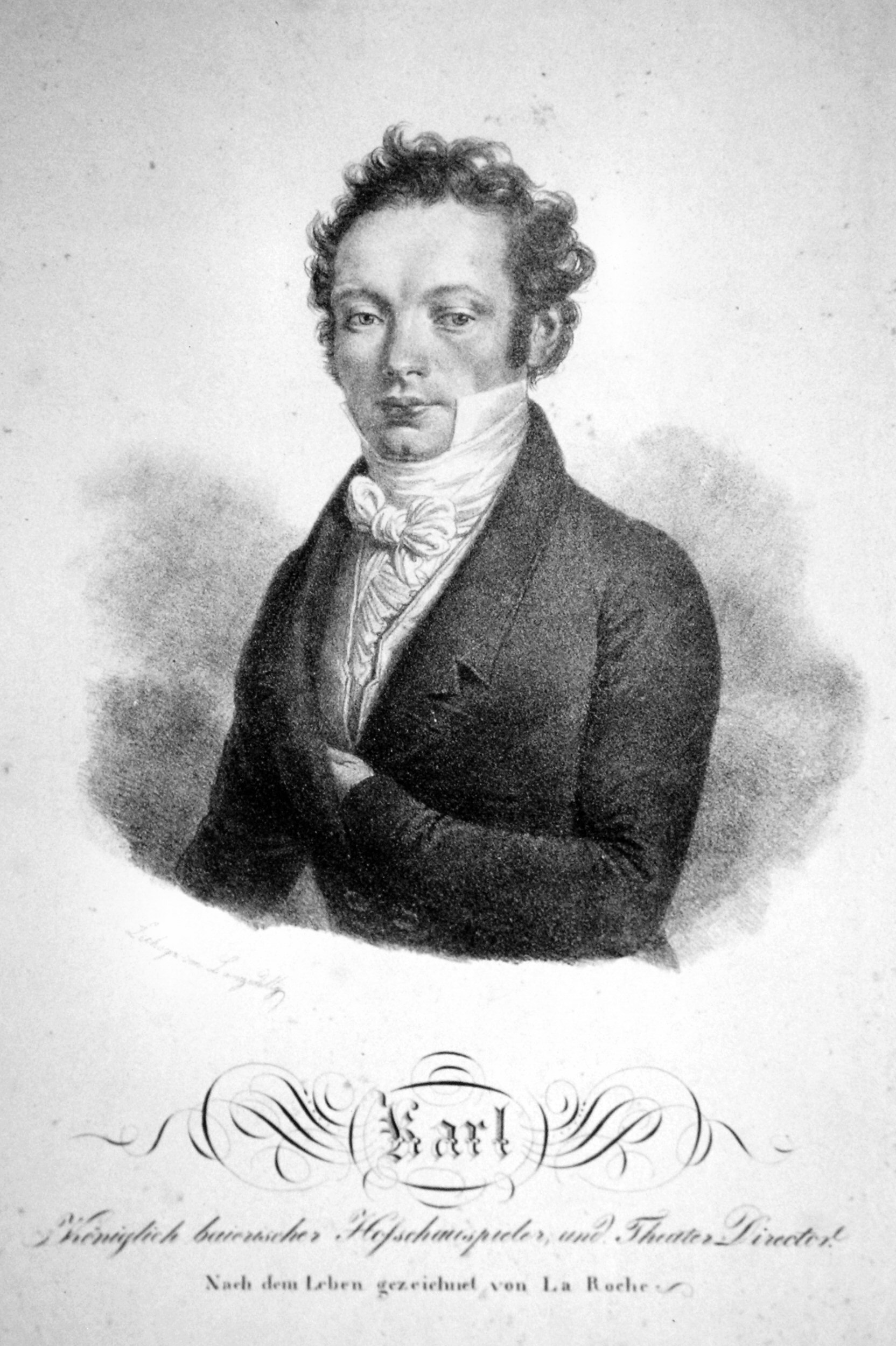
- Lithograph by Joseph Lanzedelly the Elder
- Born: Karl Andreas Bernbrunn; 7 November 1787
- Died: 14 August 1854 (aged 66)
- Spouse: Margarethe Lang

Karl Andreas Bernbrunn (1787–1854), known by the stage name Carl Carl, was a Kraków-born actor and theatre director.

Bernbrunn was born illegitimately on 7 November 1787 to Maria Anna Alxinger and Karl Andrä Bernbrunn. Maria Anna was the wife of the poet Johann Baptist von Alxinger (1755–1797), and daughter of army supplier Abraham Wetzlar, who converted to Catholicism in 1776.

Bernbrunn became an actor in Munich with Carl Weinmüller. In 1822 Bernbrunn became the director of the Isartor Theater in Munich, and in 1826 became the director of the Theater an der Wien in Vienna. In 1838 he bought the Theater in der Leopoldstadt, which he ran in parallel to the Theater an der Wien until 1845. The Theater in der Leopoldstadt was demolished and rebuilt in 1847 under the name Carltheater.

In Munich Bernbrunn married Margarethe Lang.

Bernbrunn died from a recurrent stroke on 14 August 1854 at Bad Ischl.

== See also ==
- Theater in der Josefstadt
