= Theater in der Josefstadt =

Theater in Vienna

Coordinates: 48°12′34″N 16°21′10″E

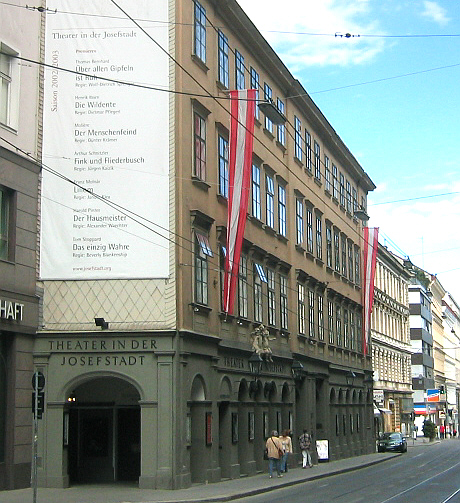
Theater in der Josefstadt

The Theater in der Josefstadt is a theater in Vienna in the eighth district of Josefstadt. It was founded in 1788 and is the oldest still performing theater in Vienna. It is often referred to colloquially as simply Die Josefstadt.

Following remodeling and rebuilding in 1822 — celebrated by the performance of the overture Die Weihe des Hauses ('Consecration of the House') by Beethoven — opera was staged there including Meyerbeer and Wagner. From 1858 onwards the theatre gave up opera and instead concentrated on straight theatre and comedy.

== Major figures in musical and theatrical history connected with the house ==
- Ludwig van Beethoven and Richard Wagner conducted there.
- Johann Nestroy and Ferdinand Raimund were connected to the theater as actors and poets.
- Johann Strauss I performed in the Sträußelsälen.
- In 1814, Ferdinand Raimund had his Vienna debut as Franz Moor in Die Räuber by Friedrich Schiller.
- In 1822, Die Weihe des Hauses was composed and directed by Ludwig van Beethoven.
- In 1829 Johann Nestroy debuted as an actor with the Die Verbannung aus dem Zauberreich oder Dreißig Jahre aus dem Leben eines Lumpen.
- From 1833 to 1836 Conradin Kreutzer was the theater conductor and on 13 January 1834, his romantic opera Das Nachtlager in Granada was first performed in the theater.
- On 20 February 1834, Ferdinand Raimund's Der Verschwender was first performed with the poet in the role of Valentin (with stage music by Kreutzer).
- Between around 1840 and 1860, famous dancers Fanny Elssler and the Spanish Pepita de Oliva performed in the theater.
- Franz von Suppé wrote music for over a hundred productions at the theater.
- The first German-language performance of Ferenc Molnár's Liliom with Josef Jarno in the title role on 28 February 1913 played a key role in the piece's long-lasting appeal.

== Directors (with their years of service) ==
- 1788 – 1812 Karl Felix Mayer
- 1812 – 1822 ?
- 1822 – 1824 Karl Friedrich Hensler
- 1824 – 1828 J. von Scheidlin
- 1828 – 1831 Carl Carl
- 1831 – 1834 Johann August Stöger
- 1834 – 1836 Scheiner
- 1837 – 1848 Franz Pokorny
- 1848 – 1855 ?
- 1855 – 1865 Johann Hoffmann
- 1865 – 1866 Johann Fürst
- 1866 – 1871 ?
- 1871 – 1877 Johann Fürst
- 1877 – 1899 ?
- 1899 – 1923 Josef Jarno
- 1924 – 1926 Max Reinhardt
- 1926 – 1933 Max Reinhardt and Emil Geyer
- 1933 – 1935 Max Reinhardt and Otto Preminger
- 1935 – 1938 Max Reinhardt and Ernst Lothar
- 1938 – 1938 Robert Valberg
- 1938 – 1945 Heinz Hilpert
- 1945 – 1953 Rudolf Steinboeck
- 1953 – 1958 Franz Stoß and Ernst Haeussermann
- 1958 – 1977 Franz Stoß
- 1977 – 1984 Ernst Haeussermann
- 1984 – 1988 Heinrich Kraus (in September 1986 Boy Gobert was to become director, but died only a few months before)
- 1988 – 1997 Otto Schenk and Robert Jungbluth
- 1997 – 1999 Helmuth Lohner and Robert Jungbluth
- 1999 – 2003 Alexander Götz and Robert Jungbluth
- 2003 – 2004 Hans Gratzer
- 2004 – 2006 Helmuth Lohner
- 2006 – 2026 Herbert Föttinger
- 2026 – Marie Rötzer – (TBC)

== Famous ensemble members ==
- Albert Bassermann
- Klaus Maria Brandauer
- Attila Hörbiger
- Curd Jürgens
- Fritz Kortner
- Werner Krauß
- Wolfgang Liebeneiner
- Helmuth Lohner
- Karl Merkatz
- Fritz Muliar
- Johann Nestroy
- Susi Nicoletti
- Ferdinand Raimund
- Otto Schenk
- Hans Thimig
- Paula Wessely
- Bernhard Wicki
