= Carltheater =

Theatre in Vienna, Austria

Coordinates: 48.215°N 16.384°E

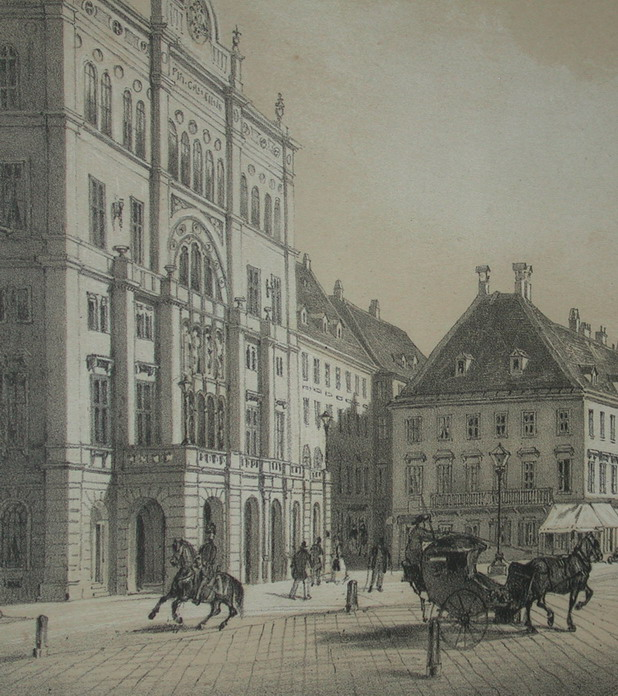
The Carltheater in 1850

The Carltheater was a theatre in Vienna. It was in the suburbs in Leopoldstadt at Praterstraße 31 (at that time called Jägerzeile).

It was the successor to the Leopoldstädter Theater. After a series of financial difficulties, that theater had been sold in 1838 to the director, Carl Carl, who continued to run it in parallel to his Theater an der Wien until 1845. Two years later, the building was partially demolished and rebuilt following the plans of architects August Sicard von Sicardsburg and Eduard van der Nüll, who would later design the Vienna State Opera.

The theatre was opened under the name Carltheater in the same year, 1847. Many Alt-Wiener Volkstheater pieces by Johann Nepomuk Nestroy premiered here; between 1854 and 1860, Nestroy was the director of the theatre. In subsequent years, many well-known Viennese playwrights wrote pieces for the Carltheater and reinforced its reputation as the favoured opera house for Viennese folk-pieces and operettas.

After a rapid changeover of directors in the 20th century, the theatre became unprofitable, and was finally closed in 1929.

In 1944, the auditorium of the theatre was almost entirely destroyed in a bomb attack. The artistically valuable facade was, however, still remarkably intact after the war. In 1951 it was demolished, with neighbouring building which had not been damaged in the war. Nowadays, the site is host to the "Galaxy"-building. A few years ago there was a plaque in Praterstraße, marking the former location of the theatre, but this is gone too now.

== Works which premiered at the Carltheater ==
- Die schlimmen Buben in der Schule, burlesque in one act, by Johann Nestroy, on December 10, 1847.
- Freiheit in Krähwinkel, "farce with song" by Johann Nestroy, on July 1, 1848.
- Judith und Holofernes, "travesty with song" by Johann Nestroy, on March 13, 1849.
- Tannhäuser, opera pastiche by Johann Nestroy, 1857
- Das Corps der Reche, operetta by Franz von Suppé, on March 5, 1864
- Dinorah, oder die Turnerfahrt nach Hütteldorf, opera parody by Franz von Suppé, on May 4, 1865
- Die schöne Galathee, operetta by Franz von Suppé on 9 September 1865
- Leichte Kavallerie, operetta by Franz von Suppé, on March 21, 1866
- Die Freigeister, operetta by Franz von Suppé, on October 23, 1866
- Banditenstreiche, operetta by Franz von Suppé, on April 27, 1867
- Die Frau Meisterin, operetta by Franz von Suppé, on January 20, 1868
- Tantalusqualen, operetta by Franz von Suppé, on October 3, 1868
- Isabella, operetta by Franz von Suppé, on November 5, 1869
- Lohengelb, oder Die Jungfrau von Dragant (Tragant), operetta by Franz von Suppé, on November 30, 1870
- Cannebas, operetta by Franz von Suppé, on November 2, 1872
- Fatinitza, operetta by Franz von Suppé, on January 5, 1876
- Prinz Methusalem, comic operetta by Johann Strauss II, on January 3, 1877
- Der Teufel auf Erden, operetta by Franz von Suppé, on January 5, 1878
- Boccaccio, opera by Franz von Suppé, on February 1, 1879
- Donna Juanita, operetta by Franz von Suppé, on February 21, 1880
- Die Carbonari, operetta by Carl Zeller, on November 27, 1880
- Wiener Kinder, comic operetta by Carl Michael Ziehrer, on February 19, 1881
- Der Gascogner, operetta by Franz von Suppé, on March 22, 1881
- Das Herzblättchen, operetta by Franz von Suppé, on February 4, 1882
- Der Vagabund, operetta by Carl Zeller, on October 30, 1886
- Die Jagd nach dem Glück, operetta by Franz von Suppé, on October 27, 1888
- Ein Deutschmeister, operetta by Carl Michael Ziehrer, on November 30, 1888
- Das Modell, operetta by Franz von Suppé, on October 4, 1895
- Das Neue Ghetto by Theodor Herzl, 1898
- Wiener Blut, operetta by Johann Strauss II, on October 25, 1899
- Die drei Wünsche, operetta by Carl Michael Ziehrer, on March 9, 1901
- Das süße Mädel, operetta by Heinrich Reinhardt, on October 25, 1901
- Der Rastelbinder, operetta by Franz Lehár, on December 20, 1902
- Der Göttergatte, operetta by Franz Lehár, on January 20, 1904
- Die lustigen Nibelungen, burlesque operetta by Oscar Straus, on November 12, 1904
- Der Schätzmeister, operetta by Carl Michael Ziehrer, on December 10, 1904
- Krieg im Frieden, operetta by Heinrich Reinhardt, on January 24, 1906
- Ein Walzertraum, operetta by Oscar Straus, on March 3, 1907
- Die geschiedene Frau, operetta by Leo Fall, on December 23, 1908
- Zigeunerliebe, operetta by Franz Lehár, on January 8, 1910
- Alt-Wien, operetta by Joseph Lanner, on December 23, 1911
- Fürst Casimir, operetta by Carl Michael Ziehrer, on September 13, 1913
- Polenblut, operetta by Oskar Nedbal, 1913
- Die erste Frau, operetta by Heinrich Reinhardt, on October 22, 1915
- Prinzessin Ti-Ti-Pa, operetta by Robert Stolz, 1928

Puccini's opera La rondine was also commissioned by the Carltheater (although its premiere in Vienna was eventually cancelled after the outbreak of the Italo-Austrian war).

== Literature ==
- Franz Hadamowsky: Das Theater in der Leopoldstadt von 1781 bis 1860, (The Theatre in the Leopoldstadt between 1781 and 1860), Höfel, Vienna 1934
- Nora Kirchschlager: Das Carltheater von 1860 bis 1872 (The Carltheater between 1860 and 1872), volume 1: Die Direktionen Brauer, Lehmann, Treumann und Ascher (The directorships of Brauer, Lehmann, Treumann and Ascher); volume 2: Spielplan (Performance schedule), Ungedr. Dipl.-Arb. Vienna, 2002
- Dieter Klein, Martin Kupf, Robert Schediwy: Stadtbildverluste Wien — Ein Rückblick auf fünf Jahrzehnte (Image loss of the city of Vienna: a retrospection through five centuries). LIT, Vienna 2005, ISBN 978-3-8258-7754-5
- Birgit Peter: Nestroytheater: Das Singspiel Johann Nestroy am Wiener Carltheater. In: Julia Danielczyk (Hrsg.): Nestroy — weder Lorbeerbaum noch Bettelstab. Österr. Theatermuseum, Wien 2000, ISBN 3-9501379-0-4, pp. 69–80
- Leopold Rosner: 50 Jahre Carl-Theater (50 years of the Carltheater), Schworella & Heick, Vienna 1897

== Sources ==
Most of the information in this article is taken from the German Wikipedia article.
