= Božidara Turzonovová filmography =

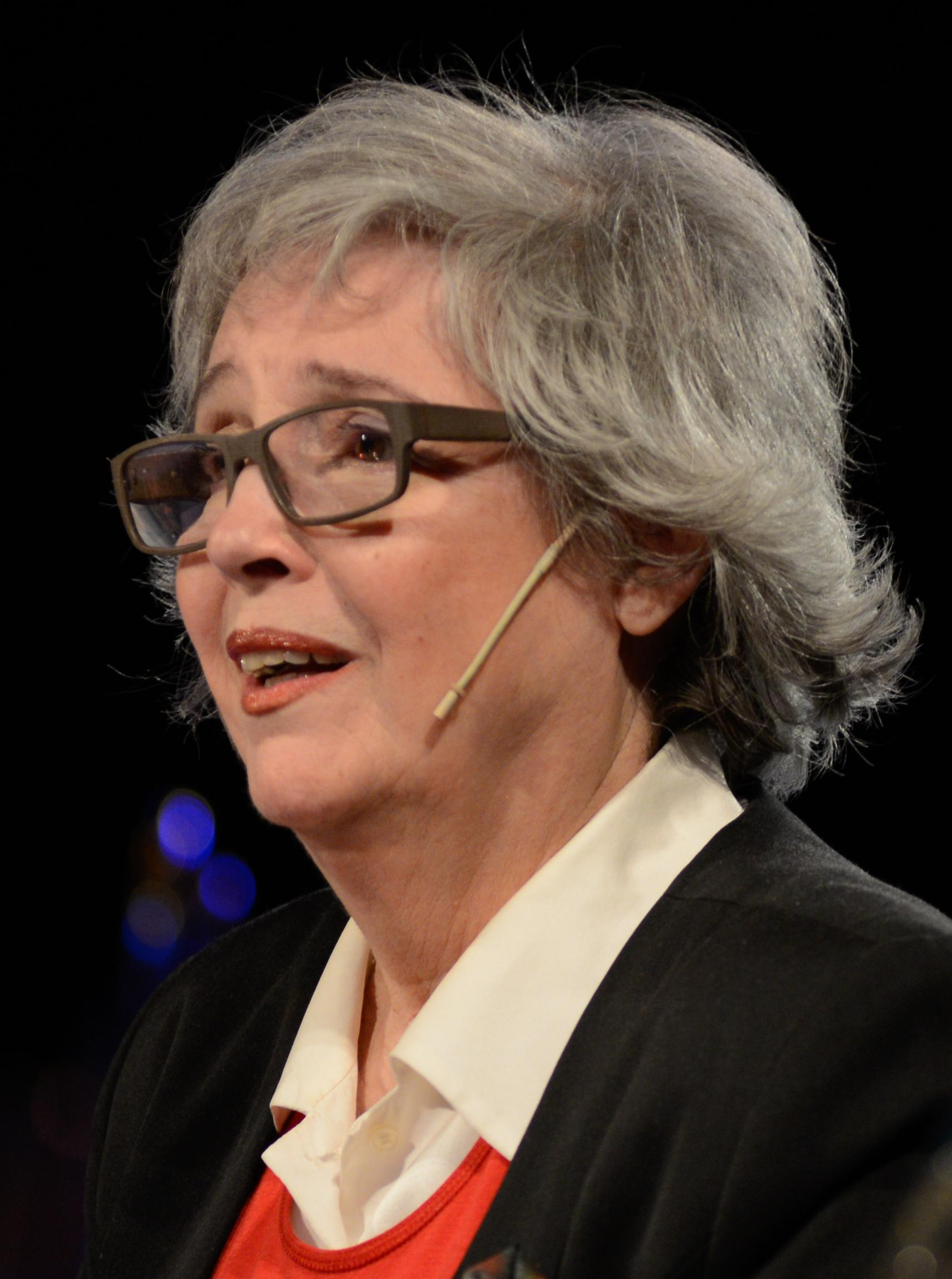
- Photo: Eduard Kudláč
- Occupation: Actress
- Years active: 1961–present

The filmography of Bulgarian-born Slovak actress Božidara Turzonovová chronicles her work through the artist's fifty years as a film, television and stage actress. She entered film industry in 1961, and made her official cinematic debut in the Vladislav Pavlovič's production of Most na tú stranu. Overall, she appeared in one-hundred-seventy-one titles to date, of which thirty-five are feature, and one-hundred-thirty-seven television films or series. While on stage, Turzonovová was cast in one-hundred-eight plays or musicals, eight of which have been also televised.

== Filmography ==
=== Film ===
Year	Title	Role	Notes
1961	Most na tú stranu	Eva	B&W
1964	Senzi mama	Tvrdoňová	B&W
1970	Eden a potom...	Marie-Eve "Mária"	CSSR/FR · voice role (in Slovak version only)
1971	Hry lásky šálivé	Sandra Vergellesi	Pilot sequence: "Arabský kůň" · in Czech
1972	Andrej Sládkovič - básnik mladosti	Featured poet	Documentary · short (Note: Based on the Academy of Motion Picture Arts and Sciences rule, a short film is defined as "an original motion picture that has a running time of not more than 40 minutes including all credits".) · voice role
1973	Javor a Juliana	Anička	Voice role
1973	Akce Bororo	Zuzana · Ori-Ana	In Czech
1973	Podezření	Dr. Born's mistress	B&W · in Czech
1975	Cesta ženy	Anna Dubská	Voice role · uncredited
1976	Bouřlivé víno	Kateřina Mlčochová	Pilot instalment of a three entry film series · in Czech
1976	Krátky život	Mirka "Szarotka"	PL/CSSR · voice role (in Slovak version only)
1976	10% nádeje	Milka Rajterová	
1977	Bludička	Katarína Hornová	B&W · title role
1978	Penelopa	Eva Kamenická	
1978	Příběh lásky a cti	Karolina Světlá	In Czech
1979	Božská Ema	Emmy Destinn	Title role · in Czech
1980	Postav dom, zasaď strom	Helena Šimiaková	Voice role
1980	Odveta	Kučerová	
1981	Zralé víno	Kateřina Janáková	Follow-up instalment of Bouřlivé víno series · in Czech
1983	Kočka	Anna	Voice role · uncredited
1984	Anděl s ďáblem v těle	Mme "Gábi" Stolařová	Musical · pilot instalment of Anděl series · in Czech
1985	Noc smaragdového měsíce	Marie Kysučanová	In Czech
1986	Mladé víno	Kateřina Janáková	Third instalment of Bouřlivé víno series · in Czech
1987	Víkend za milión	Magda Veselá	
1988	Anděl svádí ďábla	Mme "Gábi" Stolařová	Musical · second instalment of Anděl series · in Czech
1989	Právo na minulosť	Věra	CSSR/SSSR · voice role
1990	Marta a já	Róza Kluge	AT/CSSR/FR/DE/IT · in Czech
1996	Suzanne	Deny's mother	CZ/SK
1997	Orbis Pictus	Marta	CZ/SK
1999	Praha očima...	Marta's mother	CZ/FR/NL · sequence: "Obrázky z výletu" · in Czech (Note: Her part performed in Slovak.)
2000	Der Lebensborn: Pramen života	Grétka's mother	CZ
2003	Zostane to medzi nami	Danica's mother	CZ/SK · bilingual film
2007	Vratné lahve	Kvardová	CZ/DN/UK · in Czech
2009	The Lunchbox	Ružena Stoláriková	SK/US · short · also known as Obedár · in Slovak
2013	Kovář z Podlesí	Shopkeeper	CZ/SK · in Czech
The works are listed in order of the dates of their first public performance.

=== Television ===
==== TV movies ====
Year	Title	Role	Notes
1962	Mladé letá	Elenka	Play by Kukučín
1964	Smoliarka	Santina "Tina"	B&W · title role (credited as D. Thurzonovová)
1964	Charleyho teta	Kitty Verdun	Play by Thomas
1968	Dobrodružstvo pri obžinkoch	Miluša	B&W · Play by Palárik
1969	Rozmajrín	Anička, Janík's girlfriend	B&W · Play by Urbánek
1969	Moliér	—	Play by Bulgakov
1969	Volpone	—	B&W · Play by Jonson
1970	Strach z pekla	Bss Adele von Stromberg	Play by Nestroy (Höllenangst)
1970	Psíčci lorda Carletona	Italian, Colonel's escort	B&W · Play by Karvaš in Czech (Note: Her part performed in Italian.)
1970	Don Quijote zvádza boj	Naďa	Play by Korostylov
1971	Hájnikova žena	Hanka Čajková	Play by Hviezdoslav · title role
1971	Básnikova cesta do neba	—	
1971	Bírbal a sprisahanci	—	The second sequel to Básnikova cesta do neba film
1972	Svedectvo	Ethel, Heller's assistant	
1972	Kým kohút nezaspieva	Fanka, Ondrej's girlfriend	B&W · Play by Bukovčan
1972	Othello	Bianca	Play by Shakespeare
1973	Ďalej to ide ako po masle	—	
1974	Rosmersholm	Rebekka Westová	Play by Ibsen
1974	Džbán plný ambrózie	Mária Ivanková	Play by Zelinová · autobiography of Tajovský
1974	Prípad z Amagerskej lúky	—	
1975	Čokoládový hrdina	Raina Petkovová	B&W · Play by G. B. Shaw
1975	Kean	Amy	Play by Dumas
1975	Minúta rozhodnutia	Marta Lacková, major's wife	Play by Niňaj
1976	Nad ránom	Amália	
1976	Prázdniny u starej mamy	Helena Dudášová, Paľo's mom	Play by Gejdoš
1976	Plukovník Chabert	Grófka Ferraudová (Chabertová)	Play by Balzac
1976	Nalaďte srdcia svoje aj hlas	—	Play by I. Shaw
1976	Sen o Krištofovi Kolumbovi	—	
1977	Nestarnúce filmové melódie	—	
1977	Doktor Jorge	Clarissa	Play by Namora
1977	Amok	Dáma	Play by Zweig
1977	Počúvajme slnko	—	
1977	Rusalka	Princess from abroad	Musical based on a Dvořák's opera · GDR · in Czech
1978	Deti	Barbara	
1978	Katka	—	Play by Plachetka
1978	Na vysokej skale...	Anna, Princess of Kraków	TV anthology · episode: "Spišský rebel"
1978	Tosca	—	Opera by Puccini
1978	Listy Juliane	Prestová	Play by James
1979	Poviem mu to sám	Eva	
1979	Sonatína pre páva	Milica	Play by Zahradník
1979	Tretia patetická	—	Play by Pogodin
1979	Vojvodkyňa z Amalfi	Title role (of the Duchess)	Play by Webster
1979	Poetische Betrachtungen in freyen Stunden	—	GDR · musical
1980	Veselé panie z Windsoru	Mrs Fordová	
1980	Šustot suchého listí	—	In Czech
1981	Autoservis	—	Short
1981	Desiaty chlap	Eva Gregorová	
1981	Obyčajné rozmery	Dr Marta Marošová	Play by Gábrišová · leading role
1981	Stratili sme slnko	—	
1981	Zaucho	Surgeon's stepdaughter	
1982	Medzi nami	Pam	Play by Ayckbourn
1982	Hniezdo na ôsmom poschodí	—	
1982	Kronika	—	
1982	Matka	Annie	
1983	Jožko Púčik a jeho kariéra	Mrs Chairwoman	
1983	Medik	—	
1983	Silvestrovské prianie	Alica Benková	Leading role
1983	Nehovor mi starký	Mother	
1983	Bola som z olova	Dáša Jurášková	Play by Gábrišová · leading role
1983	V službách zákona	—	TV anthology · aka Na stope zločinu · episode: "V kruhu"
1984	Poviem jej to sám	Eva	The second sequel to Poviem mu to sám film
1984	Staviteľ Solness	—	
1984	Mat na dvadsať ťahov	Marta Hamarová	
1984	Decko v dome	Mrs Vodová, mother	
1985	On a ona	—	Play by A. Nicolai
1985	Ulička stratených snov	Aunt	
1985	Ideálny manžel	Lady Markby	Play by Wilde
1985	Kamenný chodníček	Verona	
1985	Jeseň vyšetrujúceho sudcu	Mária	
1985	Keď príde september	Deputy head teacher	Short
1986	A čo ja, miláčik?	Margita Pokorná	
1986	Viktória	—	
1986	O siedmich rokoch	Countess	
1986	Smutné radosti	Ružena	
1986	Vynález	Evička Valíková	
1986	Počúvaj tú melódiu	Mrs Galbová, mother	Play by Zahradník
1986	Citové súradnice	Capt. Kamasová	Play by Laco and Nakládal · leading role
1986	Riaditeľ	Katarína Poláková, wife	Play by Sokol
1986	"...to si ty, Anna?"	Psychologist, speech therapist	Play by Sliacky
1987	Predohra	—	
1988	Šesťkrát žena	Lena	Based on stories by Handzová
1988	Lúčenie	Amala	
1988	Exemplárny prípad	Kozúbková	
1988	Letiace tiene	—	
1988	Parazit	Narbonnová	
1989	Kľúč pre dvoch	Mildred	Play by Chapman & Freeman
1990	Garsónka	Mrs Kotrbová	
1991	Tajomstvo alchymistu Storitza	Ms Roderičová	Play by Verne
1992	Romulus Veľký	Júlia	Play by Dürrenmatt
1993	Láskavá účasť	—	
1993	Eros a Psyché	Afrodita	
1993	Mátohy rárohaté	—	
1994	Maťo – Palica	Maťo – Palica's mother	
1994	Zo života dona Juana	Doctor	Written by Puškáš
1994	Duchovo nájomné	Miss Deborah	Play by James
1996	Zlodejka	Martina's grandma	
1997	Alergia	Mother of Ernest	Play by Uličiansky
1997	Germinie	Jupillonová	Play by Goncourt brothers
1997	Blúznenie srdca a rozumu	Mrs de Meilcour (Mélicour)	Play by Crébillon fils
1999	Prstene pre dámu	Constanza	
2000	Čajová šálka lásky	Mother	
2003	O svatební krajce	Queen Grandma	ČT · in Czech
2006	Veľké šťastie	—	Play by Slančíková-Timrava
The works are listed in order of the years of the film production.

==== TV series ====
Year	Title	Role	Notes
1971	Parížski mohykáni	Min	Based on a novel by Dumas · unknown episode(s)
1972	Adam Šangala	Klára Rovnianska	Miniseries based on a Nádaši-Jégé's novel · final episode
1974	Buddenbrookovci	Gerda Buddenbrook	Miniseries · unknown episode(s)
1975	Vivat Beňovský!	Afanázia, governor's daughter	CSFR/HU · 3 episodes (#4–6)
1975	Tridsaťdeväť stupňov v tieni	Helena Kalinková	Based on a play by Zahradník · 2 episodes (Note: However appeared only in 2 episodes, such as "Osedlaný jazdec" and "Café Ibrahim", she is credited in 4 episodes.)
1977	Útek zo zlatej krajiny	Dede "Dida" Mason	Filmed in 1977–79 · 3 episodes (#5–7)
1979	Barbora Rösselová	Katarína von Rostenau	Miniseries based on Zlaté mesto by Horák · 3 episodes
1979	Hrkálka a Korálka	Narrator	Animated short stories by Navrátil · voice role · 7 episodes
1980	...a teraz sa rozhodni	Kučerová, class teacher	Short · unknown episode(s)
1981	Tá dáma	Ana de Mendoza	Miniseries · unknown episode(s)
1982	Život bez konca	Elvíra, "Keresztmama"	Based on a novel by Švantner · pilot
1983	Na návšteve	Narrator	Also animated short stories of twins Hrkálka and Korálka · voice role
1986	Bakalári	Libuša, mother	TV anthology · episode: "Keby to naši vedeli" · sequence #2: "...a mal tri dcéry" (Note: In 1997, re-released as part of Bakalárske návraty anthology.)
1987	Křeček v noční košili	Magda Berková, mother	ČST Praha in collaboration with WDR Köln · written by Macourek · 6 episodes · in Czech
1987	Sachsens Glanz und Preussens Gloria	Css Henriette Amalie Reuß	Fernsehen der DDR miniseries · two-part pilot: "Gräfin Cosel" (as Turzomovova) · in German
1987	Stará tehelňa	—	Short · unknown episode(s)
1988	Mesto Anatol	—	Miniseries · a novel by Kellermann · unknown episode(s)
1989	Reverend	Mrs Klemensová	Miniseries · pilot: "Maliar"
1989	Prebudenie	—	Miniseries · unknown episode(s)
1989	Dnes večer hrám ja	—	TV anthology · 1 episode
1991	Trpký voz nádeje	—	Miniseries · Old Testament stories · unknown episode(s)
1995	Hu-hu bratia	—	Miniseries · unknown episode(s)
1999	Zborovňa	Magda Matulová	STV sitcom · short · unknown episode(s)
1999	Z kapsy rozprávkára	Tavern keeper, "Gazdiná"	Short miniseries based on Dobšinský's tales · episode #2: "Polepšený Ďuro"
2006	Letiště	Anežka Holubcová	Prima soap opera · in Czech (as Anežka) / in Slovak (as Zlata) · 14 episodes (season 1)
2006	Letiště	Zlata Beláhová (1 episode)	Prima soap opera · in Czech (as Anežka) / in Slovak (as Zlata) · 14 episodes (season 1)
2007	Eden	Mrs Konkolyová	ČT · 2 episodes (#2, #4) · in Czech
2007	Ordinácia v ružovej záhrade	Kveta Pokorná	Markíza soap opera · unknown episode(s)
2008	Panelák	Jana Nitschneiderová	TV JOJ soap opera (Note: Originally released as a short TV series, the length of the work was expanded to full starting its 4 season.) · 1226 episodes (2008–2015)
2011	Zlomok sekundy	Darina, Martin's mother	Jednotka · 4 episodes (#2, #4, #13–14) (Note: However credited through all the series, she appeared only in 4 episodes.)
2014	Stopy života	Grandma	TV Barrandov · pilot: "Dívčí sen" · bilingual (Note: Her part performed in Slovak.)
2014	Tajné životy	Eva's mother	RTVS · 5 episodes (#4–5, 10, 12–13)
2015	Svet podľa Evelyn	Shopper	TV JOJ · sitcom · 1 episode
2016	Dovidenia, stará mama	Grandmother	TV JOJ · sitcom · regular cast
2017	Koliba	—	Upcoming series
The works are listed in order of the years of the film production.

=== Stage ===
==== Slovak National Theater ====
Year	Title	Role	Notes
1962	Hamlet nemá pravdu	Lia	Play by Gáspár · as guest
1963	Moriak	Laura	Play by Mrożek · as guest
1964	Koniec maškár	Guiser-Bridegroom	Play by Mahler
1964	Líšky, dobrú noc!	Jana	Play by Rusnák
1964	Plachetnice	Marika Jánošová	Play by Sobota
1964	Po páde	Felice	Play by Miller
1964	Inkognito	Evička	Play by Palárik
1965	Veľká parochňa	Girl	Play by Karvaš · as backup actor
1965	Kto sa bojí Virgínie Woolfovej?	Honey (Zlatka)	Play by Albee
1965	Mlyn	Beautiful blondie	Play by Mahler
1965	Idiot	Aglaya	Play by Dostoyevsky
1965	Stoličky	Olly	Play by R. Kipphardt
1966	Vyrozumenie	Dača	Play by Havel
1966	Hriešnica žaluje tmu	Prisoner	Play by Ťažký
1966	Sen noci svätojánskej	Fairy	Play by Shakespeare
1966	Sen noci svätojánskej	Hermia (1967)	Play by Shakespeare
1966	Salemské bosorky	Susanna Walcott	Play by Miller
1966	Najdúch	Ľudmila	Play by Záborský
1967	Experiment Damokles	Monika	Play by Karvaš
1967	Cyrano z Bergeracu	Sister Marta	Play by Rostand
1967	Tango	Ala	Play by Mrożek
1967	Višňový sad	Anya	Play by Chekhov
1967	Višňový sad	Charlotta Ivanovna (1995)	Play by Chekhov
1968	Strach z pekla	Bss Adele von Stromberg	Play by Nestroy
1968	Marína Havranová	Marka	Play by Stodola
1969	Marína Havranová	Title role (1969)	Play by Stodola
1969	Tanec nad plačom	Adela	Play by Sýkora (alias Peter Zvon)
1969	Kým kohút nezaspieva	Fanka	Play by Bukovčan · reprised (in 1994)
1969	Kým kohút nezaspieva	Mrs Babjak (1994)	Play by Bukovčan · reprised (in 1994)
1970	Henrich IV.	Frida	Play by Pirandello
1970	Kráľ Ján	Lady Faulkonbridge	Play by Dürrenmatt
1970	Maškaráda	Nina	Play by Lermontov
1970	Dobrodružstvo pri obžinkoch	Miluša	Play by Palárik
1971	Matka Guráž a jej deti	Kattrin	Play by Brecht
1971	Dom zlomených sŕdc	Ellie Dunn	Play by G. B. Shaw
1971	Rozlúčka v júni	Táňa	Play by Vampilov
1972	V predvečer	Jelizaveta	Play by Gorky · as backup actor
1972	Prvý deň karnevalu	Maria Iglesia	Play by Bukovčan
1972	Cid	Chimene (Xiména)	Play by Corneille
1972	Búrka	Katerina	Play by Ostrovsky
1973	Čas tvojho žitia	Kitty Duval	Play by Saroyan
1973	Pokojný úsvit	Zhenya Komelkowa	Play by Vasilyev
1974	Na skle maľované	Opening singer	Play by Bryll and Gärtner · made-for-TV (in 1980; reprised in 1981 and 1991)
1975	Miliónový Marco	Princess Kogatin	Play by O'Neill · as backup actor (in 1977)
1975	Miliónový Marco	Prostitute (1977)	Play by O'Neill · as backup actor (in 1977)
1975	Domy pána Sartoria	Blanche Sartorious	Play by G. B. Shaw
1976	Sonatína pre páva	Milica	Play by Zahradník
1976	Poslední	Nadežda	Play by Gorky · TV recording
1976	Krásna neznáma	Hilda	Play by Králik
1976	Živá mŕtvola	Máša	Play by Tolstoy · TV recording (in 1977)
1978	Romeo a Júlia na sklonku jesene	Dr. Helena Pluhařová	Play by Otčenášek and Balík
1978	Kráľ jeleň	Angela	Play by Gozzi
1979	Platonov	Sofia	Play by Chekhov
1979	Kolotoč	Jana	Play by Kočan
1979	My, dolupodpísaní	Alla Šindinová	Play by Geľman
1981	Gadžovia	Helena	Play by Kočan
1981	Nedeľa pre bolesť ako stvorená	Helena	Play by Williams
1982	Meštiaci	Jelena	Play by Gorky
1983	Správa o chirurgii mesta N.	Nurse in charge	Play by Daněk
1983	Mariša	Strouhalka	Play by Alois and Vilém Mrštík · TV recording (in 1984)
1984	Tri sestry	Olga Sergeyevna (Oľga)	Play by Chekhov
1985	Transport	Lavra	Play by Roshchin
1985	Napoleon	Jozefína	Play by Bruckner
1986	Jožko Púčik a jeho kariéra	Mrs Chairwoman	Play by Stodola
1987	Krvavá svadba	The Mother-Death	Play by García Lorca · TV recording (in 1989)
1987	Letní hostia	Kaléria	Play by Gorky
1988	Modrý pavilón	Angela	Play by Hubač
1988	Šopalovičovo kočovné divadlo	Jelisaveta Subotičová	Play by Simović
1990	Divá kačka	Mrs Sørby	Play by Ibsen
1992	Čaj u pána senátora	Slivková	Play by Stodola
1992	Romeo a Júlia	Nurse	Play by Shakespeare
1992	Ľudomil	Marianne de Chepy	Play by Enzensberger
1993	Andreas Búr Majster	Kraviar's mother	Play by Cíger-Hronský
1993	Krajina šíra	Anna Meinhold-Aigner	Play by Schnitzler
1994	Karate Billy sa vracia	Rosita Nickchen	Play by Klaus Pohl
1995	Alergia	Klára	Play by Uličiansky
1996	Keď tancovala...	Mary Desti	Play by Sherman
1996	Mastný hrniec	Mahuliena Babík	Play by Barč-Ivan
1996	Ženský zákon	TV recording (in 2009)	Play by Tajovský
1997	Malá nočná hudba	Mme Armfeldt	Play by Sondheim
1998	Marcus Aurelius pri Hrone	Nana · Hulda	Play by Hudec
1998	Krehká rovnováha	Edna	Play by Albee
1999	Opera za tri groše	Celia Peachum	Play by Brecht and Weill
1999	Liliom	Mrs Muskat	Play by Molnár
2000	Pomocník	Mrs Riečan	Play by Ballek and Šulaj
2002	Krajčírky	Hélēne	L'Atelier by Grumberg
2002	Sekretárky	Performer (unspecified)	Play by Wittenbrink
2003	Krcheň Nesmrteľný	Anča Sojka · Ďuro Marcin	Play by Maliti-Fraňová
2003	Veľké šťastie	Nivská	Play by Slančíková-Timrava and Pavlac
2004	Posledné leto Sarah Bernhardtovej	Sarah Bernhardt	Memoir by Murrell
2007	S mamou	Bea	Play by Kusá
2007	Mrzák z Inishmaanu	Kate Osbourne	Play by McDonagh
2008	Fetišistky	Soňa	Play by Horváthová · alternated role
2008	Kocúr na kolieskových korčuliach	Hermína Holubová	Play by Uličiansky · alternated role
2010	Mobil mŕtveho muža	Gordon's mother	Play by Ruhl
2011	Je úžasná!	Mrs Verindah-Gedge	Glorious! by Quilter
2012	Kvarteto	Jean Horton	Play by Harwood · alternated role
2012	Pohania	Natália	Play by Yablonska
2014	Ako sa Lomidrevo stal kráľom	Lomidrevo's mother	Play by Feldek · alternated role
2014	Ilúzie	Second woman	Play by Vyrypaev
2015	Nevesta hôľ	Shepherd's mother	Play by Švantner and Polák
2016	Tichý bič	Žoška Urbanová	Play by Juráňová
2017	Spievajúci dom	Erzebeth T.	Play by Daubnerová
2018	Antigone	Tiresias	Play by Sophocles
The works are listed in order of the dates of their first public performance as issued by SND.

==== Other appearances ====
Year	Title	Role	Notes
2001	Grék Zorba	Mme Hortenzia, Bubulína	DAB, Nitra · alternated role
2003	Muzikálový koktejl	Performer (unspecified)	NS, Bratislava · DAB, Nitra
2003	Židovská noc v Aréne	Performer (unspecified)	Special program · DA, Bratislava
2004	Kosa	Old Jaw	Play by Nvota · Reduta, Brno, Czech Republic
2004	Jaskynná panna	—	Play by Maliti-Fraňová · Štúdio 12, Bratislava in co-production with ASD and SND
2005	Adam Šangala	Grófka Praskovská	Play by Paštéka, Patejdl and Peteraj · DAB, Nitra · TV recording · alternated role
2006	Ginger a Fred	Ginger	Broadway Theater, Prague, Czech Republic
2009	Vrátila sa raz v noci	Fanny, mother	Play by Rovner · Ján Palárik's Theater, Trnava · TV recording (in 2014)
2014	Obchod na korze	Rozália Lautmanová	Play by Spiro and Nagy · NS, Bratislava · alternated role
The works are listed in order of the dates of their first public performance.

== See also ==
- List of awards and nominations received by Božidara Turzonovová
