= List of awards and nominations received by Božidara Turzonovová =

Božidara Turzonovová awards
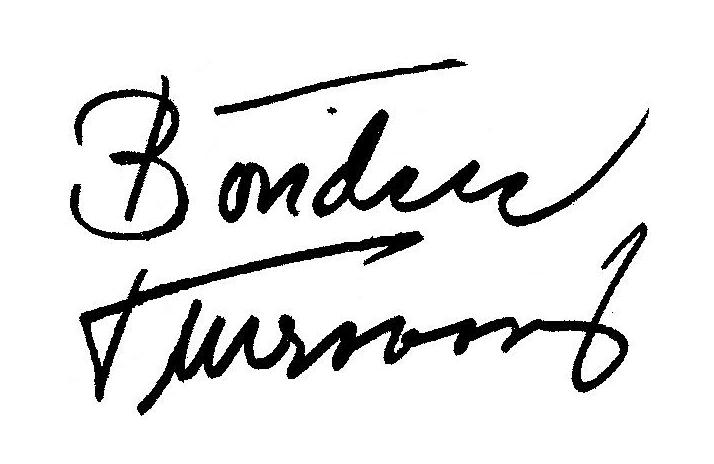
Totals
Award	Wins	Nominations
Czech Lion Awards	0	1
Banská Bystrica Film Festival	1	1
Film a Divadlo Awards	3	3
Golden Croc Awards	1	1
Golden Loop Awards	0	1
Crystal Wing Awards	1	1
DOSKY Awards	1	3
LitFond Awards	6	6
Other honors	11	11
Awards won	24
Nominations	28

Božidara Turzonovová has received a number of awards and accolades in recognition of her success in the film industry. As of March 2017, she has accumulated a total of 24 awards out of 28 nominations.

== Awards and nominations ==
=== Film awards ===
==== Banská Bystrica Film Festival Awards ====
Year	Nominated work	Category	Result	Ref.
1984	Anděl s ďáblem v těle	Best Actress	Won	

==== Czech Lion Awards ====
Year	Nominated work	Category	Result	Ref.
1997	Orbis Pictus	Best Supporting Actress	Nominated	

==== Film a Divadlo Awards ====
Year	Nominated work	Category	Result	Ref.
1977	Penelopa	Best Actress	Won	
1978	Penelopa / Bludička	Most Popular Actress	Won	
1982	Odveta	Most Popular Actress	Won	

=== Television awards ===
==== Golden Croc Awards ====
Year	Nominated work	Category	Result	Ref.
1972	Hájnikova žena	Best Actress	Won	

==== Golden Loop Awards ====
Year	Nominated work	Category	Result	Ref.
2001	Lúčna harfa	Best Female Dubber	Nominated	

=== Stage awards ===
==== Crystal Wing Awards ====
Year	Nominated work	Category	Result	Ref.
1997	Malá nočná hudba	Theater and Audiovisual Art	Won	

==== DOSKY Awards ====
Year	Nominated work	Category	Result	Ref.
2002	Grék Zorba	Best Performance by an Actress	Nominated	
2004	Posledné leto Sarah Bernhardtovej	Best Performance by an Actress	Nominated	
2012	Pohania	Best Performance by an Actress	Won	

==== LitFond Awards ====
Year	Nominated work	Category	Result	Ref.
1996	Alergia	Outstanding Performance	Won	
1998	Malá nočná hudba	Outstanding Performance	Won	
2001	Príbeh bez konca	For the Study of a Play	Won	
2004	Posledné leto Sarah Bernhardtovej	Outstanding Performance	Won	
2008	Mrzák z Inishmaanu	Outstanding Performance	Won	
2009	Vrátila sa raz v noci	Outstanding Performance	Won	

=== Other honors ===
Year	Award	Category	Result	Ref.
1979	Meritorious Artist Title	Lifetime achievement	Honored	
2002	Actor's Mission Award	Lifetime achievement	Honored	
2002	Pribina Cross Award	1st class	Honored	
2007	LitFond Award	Lifetime achievement	Honored	
2008	Pribina Cross Award	2nd class	Honored	
2009	Jozef Kroner Award	Lifetime achievement	Honored	
2010	Thalia Flower Award	Lifetime achievement	Honored	
2012	Slovenka Award	The Woman of the Year Title – Art and Culture	Won	
2012	Slovenka Award	Special achievement	Honored	
2012	Pavol Strauss Award	Lifetime achievement	Honored	
2016	OTO Awards	Hall of Fame	Honored	

== See also ==
- Božidara Turzonovová filmography
