= 2020 in film =

2020 in film is a history of events, which includes the highest-grossing films, award ceremonies, critics' lists of the best films of 2020, festivals, a list of country-specific lists of films released, and notable deaths.

== Evaluation of the year ==
The year was greatly affected by the COVID-19 pandemic, with numerous films originally scheduled for theatrical release postponed or released on video-on-demand or streaming services. However, several film companies stopped reporting box-office numbers during this time due to the COVID-19 pandemic, and several films were still in theaters where guidelines were in place. As a result, film grosses will increase if they are re-released in the future. This was also the first year since 2007 that no film grossed $1 billion. 2020 was the first year in which a non-English-language film became the highest-grossing film of the year worldwide, with Demon Slayer: Kimetsu no Yaiba Mugen Train grossing the most overall.

== Highest-grossing films ==
The top films released in 2020 by worldwide gross are as follows:

Highest-grossing films of 2020
Rank	Title	Distributor	Worldwide gross
1	Demon Slayer: Kimetsu no Yaiba Mugen Train	Toho / Aniplex	$507,127,293
2	The Eight Hundred	CMC Pictures	$461,421,559
3	My People, My Homeland	China Lion	$433,241,288
4	Bad Boys for Life	Sony	$426,505,244
5	Tenet	Warner Bros.	$365,309,519
6	Sonic the Hedgehog	Paramount	$319,715,683
7	Dolittle	Universal	$251,410,631
8	Jiang Ziya	Beijing Enlight	$243,883,429
9	A Little Red Flower	HG Entertainment	$238,600,000
10	Shock Wave 2	Universe Films	$226,400,000

After being re-released in 4K in China, earning $26.4 million, the overall gross for the 2001 film Harry Potter and the Philosopher's Stone increased to over $1.008 billion, becoming the 47th film overall and the second billion-dollar film in the Wizarding World franchise, after Harry Potter and the Deathly Hallows – Part 2, at $1.342 billion.

=== 2020 box office records ===
- China overtook North America as the world's largest box office market for the first time in 2020. China generated $2.7 billion in theatrical revenue compared to North America's $2.3 billion, the lowest for the North American box office in at least 40 years. This has been largely attributed to the COVID-19 pandemic, which has had a greater negative impact in North America than in Asia.
- Because of the relatively smaller impact of the pandemic on Asian film markets, the majority (6) of the top ten highest-grossing films of the year are East Asian (Chinese and Japanese) productions for the first time in history, as the rankings were previously dominated by North American productions.

==== Film records ====
- At the end of 2020, The Eight Hundred became the first Chinese and first non-Hollywood film to top the global box office with more than $450 million in gross. It was later overtaken by Demon Slayer the Movie: Mugen Train in May 2021.
- Demon Slayer: Kimetsu no Yaiba – The Movie: Mugen Train, a Japanese anime film based on the manga series Demon Slayer: Kimetsu no Yaiba, broke a number of box office records.
  - It became the first ever non-Hollywood film production to become the highest-grossing film of the year and the first 2D-animated feature to become the highest grossing movie of the year since Disney's The Lion King in 1994.
  - It set the all-time box office records for the highest-grossing Japanese film, the highest-grossing anime film, and the highest-grossing R-rated animated film.
  - In Japan, Mugen Train set the first-day opening record with ¥1.2 billion ($11.3 million), before breaking the opening weekend record with ¥4.6 billion ($43.8 million) over three days. It went on to have the highest-grossing second weekend and, in ten days, became the fastest film to cross ¥10 billion ($96.7 million), surpassing Spirited Away (2001), which had previously crossed the ¥10 billion milestone in 19 days and held the record for 19 years. Mugen Train also became the fastest film to cross ¥20 billion in Japan, again faster than Spirited Away. It also set the record for the highest-grossing IMAX release in Japan, surpassing the previous record holder, Bohemian Rhapsody (2018). In 59 days, Mugen Train set another record as the fastest film to cross the ¥30 billion milestone, faster than Spirited Away, which took 253 days to reach the same milestone. In 66 days, the film set another record as the first film to top the Japanese box office charts for ten straight weekends (since the charts began publication in 2004). In 73 days, Mugen Train grossed ¥32.48 billion to become the highest-grossing film of all time in Japan, surpassing Spirited Away, which held the record for 19 years.
  - In Taiwan, Mugen Train grossed NT$360 million (US$12.6 million) in 17 days, setting the record for the highest-grossing animated film of all time in Taiwan, surpassing the previous record holders Frozen 2 (2019) and Your Name (2016). In 20 days, Mugen Train became the first animated film to cross NT$400 million in Taiwan, before later crossing the NT$500 million milestone.
  - The film was also the first R-rated film since Die Hard with a Vengeance in 1995 to be the highest-grossing film of the year overall.
  - The film was also the first animated film since The Jungle Book in 1967 to be the highest-grossing film of the year overall and not the highest-grossing animated film of all time at the time.
- Sonic the Hedgehog broke Pokémon: Detective Pikachu's record for the highest opening weekend for a film based on a video game, with $70 million in domestic gross in the United States and Canada. It went on to become the highest-grossing film based on a video game in the United States and Canada, surpassing Detective Pikachu, although it did not beat it in the worldwide box office. Sonic the Hedgehog is also the highest-grossing superhero film of 2020, ending the Marvel Cinematic Universe's decade-long run of having the highest-grossing superhero film of the year (from 2010 to 2019).
- For the first time in box office history, two non-American animated film productions (Asian films), Demon Slayer the Movie: Mugen Train from Japan and Jiang Ziya from China, have become the highest-grossing animated films of the year. This has been partly attributed to the COVID-19 pandemic. It is also the first time since 1987 that a non-American animated film (Japanese anime), Demon Slayer the Movie: Mugen Train, became the highest-grossing animated film of the year, and the first time an anime has made it to the top 10 highest-grossing films of the year worldwide.
- 2020 was the first year since 2007 not to have a film gross $1 billion during its theatrical run, the first year since 2005 not to have a film gross over $900 million, and the first year since 2000 not to have a film gross over $600 million, due to the COVID-19 pandemic.
- 2020 was the first year since 1995 in which no film was among the 20 highest-grossing films of all time at the time due to the COVID-19 pandemic.

== Events ==
- April 28, 2020 - AMC Theaters announced that they will not carry films from Universal Pictures following the premium video on demand release of DreamWorks Animation's Trolls World Tour due to the COVID-19 pandemic, after NBCUniversal CEO Jeff Shell commented in The Wall Street Journal that the studio wanted to release films via premium video-on-demand simultaneously with theatrical releases.
- July 28, 2020 - AMC and Universal resolved their dispute, with AMC agreeing to a shorter theatrical window of 17 days before Universal could release their films via premium VOD, as well as revenue sharing on the premium VOD window.

=== Award ceremonies ===
2020 film awards ceremonies
Date	Event	Host	Location
January 5	77th Golden Globe Awards	Hollywood Foreign Press Association	Beverly Hills, California, U.S.
January 11	25th Forqué Awards	Entidad de Gestión de Derechos de los Productores Audiovisuales	Madrid, Spain
January 12	25th Critics' Choice Awards	Broadcast Film Critics Association	Santa Monica, California, U.S.
January 16	7th Feroz Awards	Asociación de Informadores Cinematográficos de España	Alcobendas, Spain
January 18	31st Producers Guild of America Awards	Producers Guild of America	Hollywood, California, U.S.
January 19	26th Screen Actors Guild Awards	SAG-AFTRA	Los Angeles, California, U.S.
January 20	55th Guldbagge Awards	Swedish Film Institute	Stockholm, Sweden
January 25	34th Goya Awards	Academy of Cinematographic Arts and Sciences of Spain	Málaga, Spain
January 25	47th Annie Awards	ASIFA-Hollywood	Los Angeles, California, U.S.
January 25	72nd Directors Guild of America Awards	Directors Guild of America	Los Angeles, California, U.S.
February 1	10th Magritte Awards	Académie André Delvaux	Brussels, Belgium
February 1	72nd Writers Guild of America Awards	Writers Guild of America, East and Writers Guild of America, West	Beverly Hills, California and New York City, New York
February 2	73rd British Academy Film Awards	British Academy of Film and Television Arts	London, England
February 8	35th Independent Spirit Awards	Independent Spirit Awards	Santa Monica, California, U.S.
February 9	92nd Academy Awards	Academy of Motion Picture Arts and Sciences	Los Angeles, California, U.S.
February 28	45th César Awards	Académie des Arts et Techniques du Cinéma	Paris, France
March 6	43rd Japan Academy Film Prize	Nippon Academy-Sho Association	Tokyo, Japan
March 16	40th Golden Raspberry Awards	Golden Raspberry Awards Foundation	Los Angeles, California, U.S. (Note: The ceremony was cancelled due to the COVID-19 pandemic, winners announced online.)
March 27	66th Filmfare Awards	The Times Group	Mumbai, Maharashtra, India
May 6	39th Hong Kong Film Awards	Hong Kong Film Awards Association Ltd.	Hong Kong (Note: The ceremony was held and broadcast live online due to the COVID-19 pandemic.)
May 8	65th David di Donatello	Accademia del Cinema Italiano	Rome, Italy (Note: The ceremony was held live at RAI Studios and broadcast by Rai 1 while the candidates were connected via video due to the COVID-19 pandemic.)
June 3	56th Grand Bell Awards	Korea Motion Picture Promotion Association	Seoul, South Korea
June 29	7th Platino Awards	Entidad de Gestión de Derechos de los Productores Audiovisuales	Panama City, Panama
September 28	62nd Ariel Awards	Academia Mexicana de Artes y Ciencias Cinematográficas	Mexico
November 21	57th Golden Horse Awards	Motion Picture Development Foundation R.O.C.	Taipei, Taiwan

=== Festivals ===
List of some of the film festivals for 2020 that have been accredited by the International Federation of Film Producers Associations (FIAPF).

2020 film festivals
Date	Event	Host	Location
January 23–February 2	2020 Sundance Film Festival	Sundance Film Festival	Park City, Utah, United States
February 20–March 1	70th Berlin International Film Festival	Berlin International Film Festival	Berlin, Germany
Cancelled	2020 Cannes Film Festival	Cannes Film Festival	Cannes, France
September 2–12	77th Venice International Film Festival	Venice Film Festival	Venice, Italy
September 10–21	2020 Toronto International Film Festival	Toronto International Film Festival	Toronto, Ontario, Canada

== Awards ==
Category/Organization	78th Golden Globe Awards February 28, 2021		26th Critics' Choice Awards March 7, 2021	Producers, Directors, Screen Actors, and Writers Guild Awards March 21-April 10, 2021	74th BAFTA Awards April 11, 2021	93rd Academy Awards April 25, 2021
Category/Organization	Drama	Musical or Comedy	26th Critics' Choice Awards March 7, 2021	Producers, Directors, Screen Actors, and Writers Guild Awards March 21-April 10, 2021	74th BAFTA Awards April 11, 2021	93rd Academy Awards April 25, 2021
Best Picture	Nomadland	Borat Subsequent Moviefilm	Nomadland			
Best Director	Chloé Zhao; Nomadland					
Best Actor	Chadwick Boseman; Ma Rainey's Black Bottom	Sacha Baron Cohen; Borat Subsequent Moviefilm	Chadwick Boseman; Ma Rainey's Black Bottom		Anthony Hopkins; The Father	
Best Actress	Andra Day; The United States vs. Billie Holiday	Rosamund Pike; I Care a Lot	Carey Mulligan; Promising Young Woman	Viola Davis; Ma Rainey's Black Bottom	Frances McDormand; Nomadland	
Best Supporting Actor	Daniel Kaluuya; Judas and the Black Messiah					
Best Supporting Actress	Jodie Foster; The Mauritanian		Maria Bakalova; Borat Subsequent Moviefilm	Youn Yuh-jung; Minari		
Best Screenplay, Adapted	Aaron Sorkin; The Trial of the Chicago 7		Chloé Zhao; Nomadland	Sacha Baron Cohen, Anthony Hines, Dan Swimer, Peter Baynham, Erica Rivinoja, Dan Mazer, Jena Friedman, Lee Kern & Nina Pedrad; Borat Subsequent Moviefilm	Christopher Hampton & Florian Zeller; The Father	
Best Screenplay, Original	Aaron Sorkin; The Trial of the Chicago 7		Emerald Fennell; Promising Young Woman			
Best Animated Film (Note: From 2020 onward, the category was shifted from the Critics' Choice Awards to the ancillary Critics' Choice Super Awards.)	Soul					
Best Original Score	Trent Reznor, Atticus Ross & Jon Batiste; Soul			—N/a	Trent Reznor, Atticus Ross & Jon Batiste; Soul	
Best Original Song	"Io sì (Seen)"; The Life Ahead		"Speak Now"; One Night in Miami...	—N/a	—N/a	"Fight for You"; Judas and the Black Messiah
Best Foreign Language Film	Minari			—N/a	Another Round	
Best Documentary (Note: From 2016 onward, the category was shifted from the Critics' Choice Awards to the ancillary Critics' Choice Documentary Awards.)	—N/a		Dick Johnson Is Dead	My Octopus Teacher		

Palme d'Or (73rd Cannes Film Festival): Not awarded due to the COVID-19 pandemic

Golden Lion (77th Venice International Film Festival):

Nomadland, directed by Chloé Zhao, United States

Golden Bear (70th Berlin International Film Festival):

There Is No Evil (شیطان وجود ندارد), directed by Mohammad Rasoulof, Iran

People's Choice Award (45th Toronto International Film Festival):

Nomadland, directed by Chloé Zhao, United States

== 2020 films ==
=== By country/region ===
- List of American films of 2020
- List of Australian films of 2020
- List of Bangladeshi films of 2020
- List of British films of 2020
- List of Canadian films of 2020
- List of Chinese films of 2020
- List of Filipino films of 2020
- List of Hong Kong films of 2020
- List of Indian films of 2020
- List of Japanese films of 2020
- List of Pakistani films of 2020
- List of Portuguese films of 2020
- List of Russian films of 2020
- List of South Korean films of 2020
- List of Spanish films of 2020

=== By genre/medium ===
- 2020 in science fiction film
- List of animated feature films of 2020
- List of horror films of 2020

== Deaths ==
Month	Date	Name	Age	Country	Profession	Notable films
January	4	Tom Long	51	Australia	Actor	The Dish; The Book of Revelation
January	8	Edd Byrnes	86	US	Actor	Grease; The Secret Invasion
January	8	Buck Henry	89	US	Actor, Screenwriter, Director	The Graduate; The Man Who Fell to Earth
January	9	Ivan Passer	86	Czech Republic	Director, Screenwriter	Born to Win; Cutter's Way
January	10	Neda Arnerić	66	Serbia	Actress	Shaft in Africa; The Sensual Man
January	12	Tony Garnett	83	UK	Producer	Kes; Earth Girls Are Easy
January	14	Jack Kehoe	85	US	Actor	The Sting; The Untouchables
January	17	Derek Fowlds	82	UK	Actor	Frankenstein Created Woman; Hotel Paradiso
January	20	Joe Shishido	86	Japan	Actor	Branded to Kill; Gate of Flesh
January	21	Terry Jones	77	UK	Actor, Director, Screenwriter	Monty Python's Life of Brian; Labyrinth
January	22	John Karlen	86	US	Actor	House of Dark Shadows; Racing with the Moon
January	23	Robert Harper	68	US	Actor	Once Upon a Time in America; The Insider
January	25	Monique van Vooren	92	Belgium	Actress	Flesh for Frankenstein; Tarzan and the She-Devil
January	26	Kobe Bryant	41	US	Actor	Daddy's Home
January	28	Marj Dusay	83	US	Actress	Breezy; MacArthur
January	28	Harriet Frank Jr.	96	US	Screenwriter	Norma Rae; Hud
January	28	Nicholas Parsons	96	UK	Actor	The Long Arm; Eyewitness
January	28	Dyanne Thorne	83	US	Actress	Ilsa, She Wolf of the SS; Point of Terror
January	30	Jörn Donner	86	Finland	Director, Screenwriter, Actor	To Love; A Sunday in September
January	31	Andree Melly	87	UK	Actress	The Brides of Dracula; The Big Day
February	1	Luciano Ricceri	79	Italy	Production Designer	A Special Day; Captain Fracassa's Journey
February	3	Gene Reynolds	96	US	Actor	The Country Girl; Boys Town
February	4	José Luis Cuerda	72	Spain	Director, Screenwriter	El bosque animado; The Blind Sunflowers
February	4	Gianni Minervini	91	Italy	Producer	Mediterraneo; Berlinguer, I Love You
February	5	Kevin Conway	77	US	Actor	F.I.S.T.; Gettysburg
February	5	Kirk Douglas	103	US	Actor, Producer, Director	Spartacus; The Bad and the Beautiful
February	6	Raphaël Coleman	25	UK	Actor	Nanny McPhee; The Fourth Kind
February	7	Orson Bean	91	US	Actor	Anatomy of a Murder; Being John Malkovich
February	7	Ann E. Todd	88	US	Actress	Intermezzo; How Green Was My Valley
February	8	Robert Conrad	84	US	Actor	Wrong Is Right; Jingle All the Way
February	8	Volker Spengler	80	Germany	Actor	The Third Generation; In a Year of 13 Moons
February	8	Grazia Volpi	78	Italy	Producer	Caesar Must Die; Fiorile
February	9	Paula Kelly	77	US	Actress, Singer	The Andromeda Strain; Sweet Charity
February	10	Marge Redmond	95	US	Actress, Singer	The Trouble with Angels; Family Plot
February	11	Joseph Vilsmaier	81	Germany	Director	Stalingrad; Comedian Harmonists
February	14	Lynn Cohen	86	US	Actress	Sex and the City; Munich
February	14	Esther Scott	66	US	Actress	Species; Transformers
February	14	John Shrapnel	77	UK	Actor	Nicholas and Alexandra; Gladiator
February	16	Zoe Caldwell	86	Australia	Actress	Extremely Loud & Incredibly Close; The Purple Rose of Cairo
February	16	Frances Cuka	83	UK	Actress	Scrooge; Oliver Twist
February	16	Jason Davis	35	US	Actor	Recess: School's Out; Rush Hour
February	16	Kellye Nakahara	72	US	Actress	Clue; She's Having a Baby
February	17	Ja'Net DuBois	87	US	Actress, Singer	I'm Gonna Git You Sucka; Charlie's Angels: Full Throttle
February	18	Flavio Bucci	72	Italy	Actor	Suspiria; Il Divo
February	18	Tapas Paul	61	India	Actor	Dadar Kirti; Guru Dakshina
February	19	José Mojica Marins	83	Brazil	Director, Actor	At Midnight I'll Take Your Soul; Coffin Joe
February	20	Claudette Nevins	82	US	Actress	Sleeping with the Enemy; Tuff Turf
February	21	Boris Leskin	97	Russia	Actor	The Falcon and the Snowman; The Package
February	24	Diana Serra Cary	101	US	Actress	Prisoners of the Storm; The Darling of New York
February	24	Ben Cooper	86	US	Actor	The Rose Tattoo; Johnny Guitar
February	27	R. D. Call	70	US	Actor	Last Man Standing; Murder by Numbers
February	27	Burkhard Driest	80	Germany	Actor	Querelle; Cross of Iron
February	27	Eugene Dynarski	86	US	Actor	Earthquake; Close Encounters of the Third Kind
February	29	Dieter Laser	78	Germany	Actor	The Human Centipede; The Ogre
March	3	Božidar Alić	65	Croatia	Actor	Operation Stadium; The Third Key
March	6	David Paul	62	US	Actor	The Barbarians; D.C. Cab
March	8	Max von Sydow	90	Sweden	Actor	The Exorcist; The Seventh Seal
March	12	Gary B. Kibbe	79	US	Cinematographer	Escape from L.A.; They Live
March	12	Tonie Marshall	68	France	Actress, Director, Screenwriter	Venus Beauty Institute; The Missionaries
March	15	Suzy Delair	102	France	Actress, Singer	Quai des Orfèvres; Rocco and His Brothers
March	16	Stuart Whitman	92	US	Actor	The Comancheros; The Longest Day
March	17	Lyle Waggoner	84	US	Actor	Love Me Deadly; Catalina Caper
March	20	Johnny Harris	87	UK	Composer	Man in the Wilderness; Fragment of Fear
March	20	Kenny Rogers	81	US	Actor, Singer	Six Pack; Longshot
March	23	Lucia Bosè	89	Italy	Actress	Story of a Love Affair; Chronicle of a Death Foretold
March	23	David Collings	79	UK	Actor	Scrooge; The Thirty Nine Steps
March	23	Alfio Contini	92	Italy	Cinematographer	Zabriskie Point; The Night Porter
March	24	Stuart Gordon	72	US	Director, Screenwriter	Re-Animator; Fortress
March	24	Terrence McNally	81	US	Screenwriter	Frankie and Johnny; The Ritz
March	24	Gerard Schurmann	96	UK	Composer	The Bedford Incident; The Lost Continent
March	26	Mark Blum	69	US	Actor	Crocodile Dundee; Desperately Seeking Susan
March	28	Barbara Rütting	92	Germany	Actress	Operation Crossbow; Neues vom Hexer
March	29	Krzysztof Penderecki	86	Poland	Composer	The Saragossa Manuscript; The Codes
March	31	Julie Bennett	88	US	Voice Actress	Gay Purr-ee; Hey There, It's Yogi Bear!
March	31	Andrew Jack	76	UK	Dialect Coach	Star Wars: The Force Awakens; The Lord of the Rings
April	1	Adam Schlesinger	52	US	Composer, Songwriter	That Thing You Do!; Music and Lyrics
April	3	Hilary Dwyer	74	UK	Actress	Witchfinder General; Wuthering Heights
April	3	Hans Meyer	94	South Africa	Actor	Red Sonja; Mauvais Sang
April	4	Jay Benedict	68	US	Actor	Victor/Victoria; The Dark Knight Rises
April	4	Carlo Leva	90	Italy	Production Designer	The Cat o' Nine Tails; The Witness
April	5	Shirley Douglas	86	Canada	Actress	Lolita; Dead Ringers
April	5	George Ogilvie	89	Australia	Director, Actor	Mad Max Beyond Thunderdome; The Water Diviner
April	5	Honor Blackman	94	UK	Actress	Goldfinger; Jason and the Argonauts
April	6	Colleen Callaghan	89	US	Makeup Artist	A Beautiful Mind; The Curious Case of Benjamin Button
April	6	James Drury	85	US	Actor	Pollyanna; Ride the High Country
April	7	Allen Garfield	80	US	Actor	The Conversation; Nashville
April	9	Malcolm Dixon	66	UK	Actor	Time Bandits; Return of the Jedi
April	10	Armando Francioli	100	Italy	Actor	Everybody in Jail; La Horse
April	10	Nobuhiko Obayashi	82	Japan	Director, Screenwriter	House; Hanagatami
April	10	Francis Reusser	77	Switzerland	Director	The Big Night; War in the Highlands
April	12	Danny Goldman	80	US	Actor	Young Frankenstein; M*A*S*H
April	15	Allen Daviau	77	US	Cinematographer	E.T. the Extra-Terrestrial; The Color Purple
April	15	Brian Dennehy	81	US	Actor	First Blood; Romeo + Juliet
April	17	Filipe Duarte	46	Portugal	Actor	The Invisible Life; The Death of Louis XIV
April	17	Sergio Fantoni	89	Italy	Actor	Senso; Esther and the King
April	19	Philippe Nahon	81	France	Actor	I Stand Alone; High Tension
April	22	Shirley Knight	83	US	Actress	Sweet Bird of Youth; Juggernaut
April	23	Bruce Allpress	89	New Zealand	Actor	Nate and Hayes; The Lord of the Rings: The Two Towers
April	26	Peter H. Hunt	81	US	Director	1776; Give 'em Hell, Harry!
April	27	Cis Corman	93	US	Casting Director, Producer	The Deer Hunter; Raging Bull
April	29	Irrfan Khan	53	India	Actor	Slumdog Millionaire; Life of Pi
April	29	John Lafia	63	US	Director, Screenwriter	Child's Play; Child's Play 2
April	29	Matty Simmons	91	US	Producer	Animal House; National Lampoon's Vacation
April	30	Rishi Kapoor	67	India	Actor	Kapoor & Sons; Bobby
April	30	Sam Lloyd	56	US	Actor	Galaxy Quest; Flubber
May	2	Jan-Olof Strandberg	93	Sweden	Actor	Faithless; Flight of the Eagle
May	3	John Ericson	93	Germany	Actor	Bad Day at Black Rock; 7 Faces of Dr. Lao
May	4	James Marcus	77	UK	Actor	A Clockwork Orange; McVicar
May	6	Leslie Pope	65	US	Set Decorator	Seabiscuit; Django Unchained
May	7	Daniel Cauchy	90	France	Actor	Bob le flambeur; When You Read This Letter
May	7	Peque Gallaga	76	Filipino	Director, Screenwriter	Shake, Rattle & Roll; Scorpio Nights
May	9	Geno Silva	72	US	Actor	Scarface; Amistad
May	9	Little Richard	87	US	Singer, Actor	Down and Out in Beverly Hills; Why Do Fools Fall in Love
May	11	Jerry Stiller	92	US	Actor	Zoolander; Hairspray
May	12	Michel Piccoli	94	France	Actor	La Grande Bouffe; Contempt
May	15	Ezio Bosso	48	Italy	Composer	The Invisible Boy; I'm Not Scared
May	15	Lynn Shelton	54	US	Director, Screenwriter	Humpday; Laggies
May	15	Fred Willard	86	US	Actor	Best in Show; Silver Streak
May	16	Monique Mercure	89	Canada	Actress	The Red Violin; Naked Lunch
May	16	Pilar Pellicer	82	Mexico	Actress	Day of the Evil Gun; La Choca
May	16	Jon Whiteley	75	UK	Actor	The Kidnappers; Moonfleet
May	19	Pembroke J. Herring	90	US	Film Editor	Tora! Tora! Tora!; Out of Africa
May	22	Denise Cronenberg	81	Canada	Costume Designer	Dead Ringers; Naked Lunch
May	24	Jean-Loup Dabadie	81	France	Screenwriter	Such a Gorgeous Kid Like Me; Parisian Life
May	26	Richard Herd	87	US	Actor	All the President's Men; Get Out
May	26	Irm Hermann	77	Germany	Actress	The Bitter Tears of Petra von Kant; Effi Briest
May	26	Anthony James	77	US	Actor	Unforgiven; High Plains Drifter
May	27	Larry Kramer	84	US	Screenwriter	Women in Love; Lost Horizon
May	27	Peggy Pope	91	US	Actress	9 to 5; The Last Starfighter
May	28	Lennie Niehaus	90	US	Composer	Unforgiven; Bird
May	31	Dan van Husen	75	Germany	Actor	Nosferatu the Vampyre; Salon Kitty
June	2	Mary Pat Gleason	70	US	Actress	Intolerable Cruelty; The Crucible
June	2	Héctor Suárez	81	Mexico	Actor	Las fuerzas vivas; El buscabullas
June	3	Bruce Jay Friedman	90	US	Screenwriter	Splash; Stir Crazy
June	4	Mikhail Kokshenov	83	Russia	Actor	Sportloto-82
June	6	Malcolm Terris	79	US	Actor	The First Great Train Robbery; Chaplin
June	7	Alan Metter	77	US	Director	Girls Just Want to Have Fun; Back to School
June	8	Marion Hänsel	71	Belgium	Director, Screenwriter, Actress	Between the Devil and the Deep Blue Sea; Le Lit
June	11	Rosa María Sardá	78	Spain	Actress	Alegre ma non troppo; My Mother Likes Women
June	11	Mel Winkler	78	US	Actor	Devil in a Blue Dress; Doc Hollywood
June	14	Mohammad-Ali Keshavarz	90	Iran	Actor	Through the Olive Trees; Caravans
June	14	Eva Kristínová	91	Slovakia	Actress	Death Is Called Engelchen; Penelope
June	14	Sushant Singh Rajput	34	India	Actor	M.S. Dhoni: The Untold Story; Chhichhore
June	16	Patrick Poivey	72	FR	French voice actor	The Terminator; Top Gun; Die Hard
June	17	Lewis John Carlino	88	US	Director, Screenwriter	The Great Santini; I Never Promised You a Rose Garden
June	19	Ian Holm	88	UK	Actor	The Lord of the Rings; Alien
June	20	Philip Latham	91	UK	Actor	Dracula: Prince of Darkness; Force 10 from Navarone
June	21	Jürgen Holtz	87	Germany	Actor	Good Bye, Lenin!; Rosa Luxemburg
June	22	Steve Bing	55	US	Screenwriter, Producer	Kangaroo Jack; Missing in Action
June	22	Joel Schumacher	80	US	Director, Costume Designer	The Lost Boys; Falling Down
June	26	Kelly Asbury	60	US	Director	Shrek 2; Gnomeo & Juliet
June	26	Stuart Cornfeld	67	US	Producer	The Fly; Tropic Thunder
June	26	Taryn Power	66	US	Actress	House of Pleasure for Women; Sinbad and the Eye of the Tiger
June	27	Linda Cristal	89	Argentina	Actress	The Perfect Furlough; Mr. Majestyk
June	28	Louis Mahoney	81	Gambia	Actor	Cry Freedom; Omen III: The Final Conflict
June	29	Johnny Mandel	94	US	Composer, Songwriter	M*A*S*H; The Sandpiper
June	29	Carl Reiner	98	US	Actor, Director, Screenwriter	The Jerk; Oh, God!
June	30	Dan Hicks	68	US	Actor	Darkman; Evil Dead II
July	2	Tilo Prückner	79	Germany	Actor	The Magic Mountain; The NeverEnding Story
July	2	Kevin Rafferty	72	US	Documentarian, Cinematographer	The Atomic Cafe; Roger & Me
July	2	Ronald L. Schwary	76	US	Producer	Ordinary People; A Soldier's Story
July	2	Yoon Sam-yook	83	South Korea	Screenwriter, Director	I Will Survive; Suddenly at Midnight
July	3	Earl Cameron	102	Bermuda	Actor	Thunderball; The Interpreter
July	3	Saroj Khan	71	India	Choreographer	Devdas; Jab We Met
July	5	Bettina Gilois	58	US	Screenwriter	McFarland, USA; Glory Road
July	6	Ennio Morricone	91	Italy	Composer	The Good, the Bad and the Ugly; The Mission
July	8	Naya Rivera	33	US	Actress	At the Devil's Door; Mad Families
July	12	Kelly Preston	57	US	Actress	Jerry Maguire; Twins
July	14	Galyn Görg	55	US	Actress	RoboCop 2; America 3000
July	14	Maurice Roëves	83	UK	Actor	The Last of the Mohicans; Ulysses
July	16	Jonathan Oppenheim	67	US	Film Editor	Paris Is Burning; The Oath
July	16	Phyllis Somerville	76	US	Actress	Bringing Out the Dead; Little Children
July	17	Zizi Jeanmaire	96	France	Dancer, Actress	Hans Christian Andersen; Anything Goes
July	18	Haruma Miura	30	Japan	Actor	Attack on Titan; Koizora
July	18	Moonyeenn Lee	76	South Africa	Casting Director	Hotel Rwanda; Eye in the Sky
July	19	Sonia Darrin	96	US	Actress	The Big Sleep; Bury Me Dead
July	21	Annie Ross	89	UK	Actress, Singer	Blue Sky; Superman III
July	23	Sérgio Ricardo	88	Brazil	Director, Composer	Black God, White Devil; The Night of the Scarecrow
July	23	Jacqueline Scott	89	US	Actress	Macabre; Charley Varrick
July	25	John Saxon	83	US	Actor	A Nightmare on Elm Street; Enter the Dragon
July	26	Olivia de Havilland	104	UK	Actress	Gone with the Wind; The Heiress
July	28	Raavi Kondala Rao	88	India	Actor	Preminchi Choodu; Pelli Pustakam
July	30	Djemel Barek	56	FR	Algerian-Ftench actor	Candice Renoir
July	31	Alan Parker	76	UK	Director, Screenwriter	Midnight Express; Mississippi Burning
August	1	Wilford Brimley	85	US	Actor	Cocoon; The Thing
August	1	Tom Pollock	77	US	Producer, Executive	Old School; Up in the Air
August	1	Reni Santoni	81	US	Actor	Dirty Harry; Cobra
August	3	Billy Goldenberg	84	US	Composer	The Last of Sheila; Reuben, Reuben
August	5	Pete Hamill	85	US	Screenwriter, Actor	Doc; Badge 373
August	9	Anna Maria Bottini	104	Italy	Actress	The Leopard; The Law
August	9	Kurt Luedtke	80	US	Screenwriter	Absence of Malice; Out of Africa
August	9	Franca Valeri	100	Italy	Actress	The Shortest Day; Gli onorevoli
August	10	Tetsuya Watari	78	Japan	Actor	Tokyo Drifter; Brother
August	11	Trini Lopez	83	US	Singer, Actor	The Dirty Dozen; Marriage on the Rocks
August	14	Linda Manz	58	US	Actress	Days of Heaven; Gummo
August	16	Nikolai Gubenko	78	Russia	Actor, Director	They Fought for Their Country; I Am Twenty
August	18	Ben Cross	72	UK	Actor	Chariots of Fire; Star Trek
August	22	Allan Rich	94	US	Actor	Quiz Show; Serpico
August	23	Benny Chan	58	Hong Kong	Director, Screenwriter	New Police Story; Rob-B-Hood
August	23	Lori Nelson	87	US	Actress	Pardners; Revenge of the Creature
August	27	David S. Cass Sr.	78	US	Stuntman	Tron; Heaven's Gate
August	28	Chadwick Boseman	43	US	Actor	Black Panther; 42
September	1	Boris Klyuyev	76	Russia	Actor	D'Artagnan and Three Musketeers; Sherlock Holmes and Dr. Watson
September	3	Birol Ünel	59	Turkey	Actor	Soul Kitchen; Head-On
September	4	Annie Cordy	92	Belgium	Actress, Singer	Rider on the Rain; The Breach
September	5	Jiří Menzel	82	Czech Republic	Director, Screenwriter	Closely Watched Trains; My Sweet Little Village
September	6	Kevin Dobson	77	US	Actor	Midway; All Night Long
September	8	Ronald Harwood	85	UK	Screenwriter	The Pianist; The Diving Bell and the Butterfly
September	10	Diana Rigg	82	UK	Actress	On Her Majesty's Secret Service; The Hospital
September	12	Barbara Jefford	90	UK	Actress	The Ninth Gate; Ulysses
September	14	Sei Ashina	36	Japan	Actress	Silk; Kamui Gaiden
September	14	Al Kasha	83	US	Songwriter	The Poseidon Adventure; Pete's Dragon
September	20	Michael Chapman	84	US	Cinematographer	Raging Bull; Taxi Driver
September	20	Alan Tomkins	81	UK	Art Director	The Empire Strikes Back; Die Another Day
September	21	Ron Cobb	83	US	Production Designer	Conan the Barbarian; The Last Starfighter
September	21	Michael Lonsdale	89	France	Actor	Moonraker; The Name of the Rose
September	22	Michael Gwisdek	78	Germany	Actor, Director	The Baader Meinhof Complex; A Coffee in Berlin
September	23	Juliette Gréco	93	France	Actress, Singer	Orpheus; The Sun Also Rises
September	25	S. P. Balasubrahmanyam	74	India	Singer, Actor	Pavitra Bandham; Kadhal Desam
September	25	Goran Paskaljević	73	Serbia	Director, Screenwriter	The Optimists; Cabaret Balkan
September	27	Yūko Takeuchi	40	Japan	Actress	Ring; Creepy
September	28	Gene Corman	93	US	Producer	The Big Red One; Tobruk
September	28	Frédéric Devreese	91	Belgium	Composer	One Night... A Train; Benvenuta
September	29	Helen Reddy	78	Australia	Singer, Actress	Pete's Dragon; Airport 1975
September	29	Mac Davis	78	US	Singer, Songwriter, Actor	North Dallas Forty; The Sting II
September	30	Frank Windsor	92	UK	Actor	Sunday Bloody Sunday; Revolution
October	1	Murray Schisgal	93	US	Screenwriter	The Tiger Makes Out; Tootsie
October	2	Edward S. Feldman	91	US	Producer	Witness; The Truman Show
October	3	Thomas Jefferson Byrd	70	US	Actor	Bamboozled; Clockers
October	3	Armelia McQueen	68	US	Actress	Ghost; Bulworth
October	4	Clark Middleton	63	US	Actor	Sin City; Kill Bill: Volume 2
October	5	Margaret Nolan	76	UK	Actress	Goldfinger; Bikini Paradise
October	6	Tommy Rall	90	US	Actor, Dancer	Kiss Me Kate; Seven Brides for Seven Brothers
October	6	Wladimir Yordanoff	66	France	Actor	Vincent & Theo; An Officer and a Spy
October	8	Camillo Bazzoni	85	Italy	Cinematographer, Director	Suicide Commandos; A Long Ride from Hell
October	10	Kent L. Wakeford	92	US	Cinematographer	Mean Streets; Alice Doesn't Live Here Anymore
October	12	Conchata Ferrell	77	US	Actress	Edward Scissorhands; True Romance
October	13	Marisa de Leza	87	Spain	Actress	Lovers of Toledo; Alexander the Great
October	14	Rhonda Fleming	97	US	Actress	Out of the Past; Gunfight at the O.K. Corral
October	15	Bhanu Athaiya	91	India	Costume Designer	Gandhi; Lagaan
October	16	Anthony Chisholm	77	US	Actor	Premium Rush; Chi-Raq
October	17	Doreen Montalvo	56	US	Actress	In the Heights, West Side Story
October	17	Ryszard Ronczewski	90	Poland	Actor	West; And Along Come Tourists
October	19	Gianni Dei	79	Italy	Actor	Patrick Still Lives; A Girl... and a Million
October	19	Wojciech Pszoniak	78	Poland	Actor	Danton; Korczak
October	21	Marge Champion	101	US	Actress, Dancer	Give a Girl a Break; Show Boat
October	23	Yehuda Barkan	75	Israel	Actor, Director, Screenwriter	The Contract; Charlie Ve'hetzi
October	31	Sean Connery	90	UK	Actor	James Bond; The Untouchables
October	31	Charles Gordon	73	US	Producer	Die Hard; Field of Dreams
November	1	Carol Arthur	85	US	Actress	The Sunshine Boys; Blazing Saddles
November	2	Gigi Proietti	80	Italy	Actor	Febbre da cavallo; A Wedding
November	2	Elsa Raven	91	US	Actress	Back to the Future; The Amityville Horror
November	2	John Sessions	67	UK	Actor	Henry V; Gangs of New York
November	5	Geoffrey Palmer	93	UK	Actor	Mrs Brown; The Madness of King George
November	6	Fernando Solanas	84	Argentina	Director, Screenwriter	Tangos, the Exile of Gardel; Sur
November	7	John Fraser	89	UK	Actor	El Cid; Repulsion
November	10	Sven Wollter	86	Sweden	Actor	The Sacrifice; The 13th Warrior
November	12	Gernot Roll	81	Germany	Cinematographer	Nowhere in Africa; The Last Escape
November	13	Philip Voss	84	UK	Actor	Octopussy; Four Weddings and a Funeral
November	15	Soumitra Chatterjee	85	India	Actor	The World of Apu; Abhijan
November	18	Michel Robin	90	France	Actor	Amélie; The Death of Mario Ricci
November	21	Robert Garland	83	US	Screenwriter	No Way Out; The Electric Horseman
November	21	Malcolm Marmorstein	92	US	Screenwriter	Pete's Dragon; Return from Witch Mountain
November	24	Montserrat Carulla	90	Spain	Actress	The Orphanage; Furrows
November	26	Daria Nicolodi	70	Italy	Actress, Screenwriter	Deep Red; Suspiria
November	28	David Prowse	85	UK	Actor	Star Wars; A Clockwork Orange
December	1	Hugh Keays-Byrne	73	UK	Actor	Mad Max; Mad Max: Fury Road
December	2	Warren Berlinger	83	US	Actor	The Cannonball Run; The Long Goodbye
December	2	Franco Giraldi	89	Italy	Director, Screenwriter	Seven Guns for the MacGregors; Sugar Colt
December	2	Pamela Tiffin	78	US	Actress	One, Two, Three; Harper
December	4	David Lander	73	US	Actor	Used Cars; Who Framed Roger Rabbit
December	4	François Leterrier	91	France	Director, Actor	A Man Escaped; Goodbye Emmanuelle
December	7	Natalie Desselle-Reid	53	US	Actress	B.A.P.S.; Madea's Big Happy Family
December	10	Tom Lister Jr.	62	US	Actor	Friday; The Fifth Element
December	10	Barbara Windsor	83	UK	Actress	Chitty Chitty Bang Bang; Alice in Wonderland
December	11	Kim Ki-duk	59	South Korea	Director, Screenwriter	3-Iron; Pietà
December	12	Ann Reinking	71	US	Actress, Dancer	All That Jazz; Annie
December	15	Caroline Cellier	75	France	Actress	This Man Must Die; Year of the Jellyfish
December	15	George Gibbs	83	UK	Special Effects Artist	Brazil; Indiana Jones and the Temple of Doom
December	17	Jeremy Bulloch	75	UK	Actor	The Empire Strikes Back; Return of the Jedi
December	18	Peter Lamont	91	UK	Production Designer	Titanic; James Bond
December	19	David Giler	77	US	Producer, Screenwriter	Alien; Fun with Dick and Jane
December	19	Rosalind Knight	87	UK	Actress	Tom Jones; About a Boy
December	19	Eileen Pollock	73	Ireland	Actress	Far and Away; Angela's Ashes
December	20	Lee Wallace	90	US	Actor	Batman; Private Benjamin
December	22	Claude Brasseur	84	France	Actor	Bande à part; La Boum
December	28	Paul Heller	93	US	Producer	Enter the Dragon; My Left Foot
December	29	Claude Bolling	90	France	Composer	Borsalino; California Suite
December	29	Adolfo "Shabba Doo" Quiñones	65	US	Actor, Dancer	Breakin'; Lambada
December	30	Dawn Wells	82	US	Actress	The Town That Dreaded Sundown; Winterhawk
December	31	Robert Hossein	93	France	Actor, Director	The Conspirators; Rififi
December	31	Joan Micklin Silver	85	US	Director	Crossing Delancey; Loverboy

== Film debuts ==
- Jon Beavers – The Only One
- Alyla Browne – Children of the Corn
- Gabriel Guevara – Charter
- Alan Kim – Minari
- Jayme Lawson – Farewell Amor
- Jay Lycurgo – Listen
- Talia Ryder – Never Rarely Sometimes Always
- Kiran Sonia Sawar – Mogul Mowgli
- Rachel Sennott – Tahara
- Shelby Simmons – Stargirl
- Milena Smit – Cross the Line
