= List of film festivals in Slovakia =

This is a list of film festivals in Slovakia.

== International film festivals ==
- Bratislava
- Art Film Fest
- Cinematik

== Documentary ==
- Etnofilm
- Hory a film
- ekotopfilm
- Envirofilm
- Festival Horských Filmov
- International Festival of Outdoor Films (IFOF)

== Student film festivals ==
- Early Melons (international)
- Áčko (VSMU)
- Frame (FMK UCM)

== Animation festivals ==
- Fest Anča (international)
- Bienále animácie

== Online film festivals ==
- Azyl
- ArtCinema
