= The Tricky Game of Love =

1971 Czechoslovak comedy film

- Theatrical release poster
- Original title: Hry lásky šálivé
- Directed by: Jiří Krejčík
- Written by: Giovanni Boccaccio; Markéta Navarrská
- Screenplay by: Jiří Krejčík
- Based on: The Decameron; Náušnice
- Produced by: Ladislav Hanuš
- Starring: "Arabský kůň"; Božidara Turzonovová; "Náušnice"; Jiří Sovák
- Cinematography: Jaromír Šofr
- Edited by: Josef Dobřichovský
- Music by: Zdeněk Liška
- Distributed by: Ústřední půjčovna filmů
- Release date: October 22, 1971
- Running time: 108 minutes
- Country: Czechoslovakia
- Language: Czech

The Tricky Game of Love (Czech: Hry lásky šálivé) is a Czech comedy film directed by Jiří Krejčík. It was released in two sequences on October 22, 1971, in Czechoslovakia.

== Cast ==
Giovanni Boccaccio - "Arabský kůň"

- Božidara Turzonovová - Sandra Vergellesi
- Miloš Kopecký - Francesco Vergellesi
- Jozef Adamovič - Ricciardo Minutolo
- Josef Chvalina - nobleman
- Jan Přeučil - messenger
- Oldřich Velen - nobleman
- Jaroslav Blažek - nobleman
- Radko Chromek - jeweler
- Ilona Jirotková - Bianca, chambermaid
- Gustav Opočenský - fashioner
- Jan Trávníček - servant
- Jiří Vašků - nobleman
- Luděk Munzar - narrator (voice role)

Markéta Navarrská - "Náušnice"

- Jiří Sovák - The Count
- Slávka Budínová - The Countess
- Magda Vašáryová - chambermaid
- Pavel Landovský - servant
