= List of accolades received by The Lives of Others =

The Lives of Others, a 2006 German thriller, marks the feature film debut of director and screenwriter Florian Henckel von Donnersmarck and stars Ulrich Mühe. It has received numerous awards and nominations.

Organization	Award	Recipient(s)	Result
Academy of Motion Picture Arts and Sciences	Best Foreign Language Film	The Lives of Others	Won
Argentine Academy of Cinematography Arts and Sciences (Academia de las Artes y Ciencias Cinematográficas de la Argentina)	South Award - Best Foreign Film (Premio Sur; Mejor Película Extranjera)	The Lives of Others (La vida de los otros)	Won
Académie des Arts et Techniques du Cinéma	César Awards - Best Foreign Film (Meilleur Film Étranger)	The Lives of Others (La Vie des autres)	Won
Accademia del Cinema Italiano	David di Donatello Award for Best European Union Film (Premi David di Donatello per il Miglior Film dell'Unione Europea)	The Lives of Others (Le vite degli altri)	Won
AARP The Magazine	Movies for Grown Ups: Best Foreign-Language Film	The Lives of Others	Won
Argentine Film Critics Association (Asociación de Cronistas Cinematrográficos de la Argentina)	Silver Condor - Best Foreign Film, Not in the Spanish Language (Cóndor de Plata - Mejor Película Extranjera)	The Lives of Others (La vida de los otros)	Won
Australian Film Critics Association	Best Overseas Film	The Lives of Others	Nominated
Bavarian State Government	Bavarian Film Awards - Best Actor (Darstellerpreis)	Ulrich Mühe	Won
Bavarian State Government	Bavarian Film Awards - Best Direction (Young Film) (Regiepreis [Nachwuchs])	Florian Henckel von Donnersmarck	Won
Bavarian State Government	Bavarian Film Awards - Best Screenplay (Drehbuchpreis)	Florian Henckel von Donnersmarck	Won
Bavarian State Government	VGF Award (VGF Preis)	Wiedemann & Berg Filmproduktion	Won
BBC Four	BBC Four World Cinema Award	The Lives Of Others	Nominated
Bernhard Wicki Memorial Fund (Bernhard Wicki Gedächtnis Fonds e.V.)	Bernhard Wicki Film Award - The Bridge - German Film Peace Award (Bernhard Wicki Filmpreis - Die Brücke – Der Friedenspreis des Deutschen Films)	Florian Henckel von Donnersmarck and The Lives of Others (Das Leben der Anderen)	Won
Bernhard Wicki Memorial Fund (Bernhard Wicki Gedächtnis Fonds e.V.)	Bernhard Wicki Film Award - The Bridge - German Film Peace Award (Bernhard Wicki Filmpreis - Die Brücke – Der Friedenspreis des Deutschen Films)	Ulrich Mühe	Won
Brazilian Academy of Cinema (Academia Brasileira de Cinema)	Grand Prize: Best Foreign Feature Film (Grande Prêmio: Melhor Longa-Metragem Estrangeiro)	The Lives of Others (A Vida dos Outros)	Won
British Academy of Film and Television Arts	British Academy Film Award for Best Film Not in the English Language	The Lives of Others (Das Leben der Anderen), Quirin Berg, Max Wiedemann, Florian Henckel von Donnersmarck	Won
British Academy of Film and Television Arts	Best Film	The Lives of Others (Das Leben der Anderen), Quirin Berg, Max Wiedemann	Nominated
British Academy of Film and Television Arts	Best Director	Florian Henckel von Donnersmarck	Nominated
British Academy of Film and Television Arts	Best Original Screenplay	Florian Henckel von Donnersmarck	Nominated
British Academy of Film and Television Arts	Best Leading Actor	Ulrich Mühe	Nominated
British Independent Film Awards	Best Foreign Independent Film	The Lives of Others	Won
Bunte and the Deutsche Filmakademie	New Faces Award for Best Director	Florian Henckel von Donnersmarck	Won
Cinema Writers Circle (Círculo de Escritores Cinematográficos)	CEC Award for Best Foreign Film (CEC Premio al Mejor Película Extranjera)	The Lives of Others (La vida de los otros)	Won
Cinereferendum San Fedele	Premio San Fedele	The Lives of Others (Le vite degli altri)	Won
Circle of Dutch Film Journalists (Kring van Nederlandse Filmjournalisten)	Best Film of the Year - International (Beste film van het jaar - Internationaal)	The Lives of Others (Das Leben der Anderen)	Won
Cologne Conference	Screenwriter Award (Autoren Preise)	Florian Henckel von Donnersmarck	Won
Danish Film Academy (Danmarks Film Akademi)	Robert Award - Best Non-American Film (Årets ikke-amerikanske film)	The Lives of Others (De andres liv)	Won
(Danish) National Association of Film Critics (Filmmedarbejderforeningen)	Bodil Awards - Best Non-American Film (Bodil Præmier - Bedste ikke-amerikanske film)	The Lives of Others (De andres liv), Florian Henckel von Donnersmarck	Won
Dante Alighieri Society (Società Dante Alighieri)	Dante Alighieri Society Gold Medal (Medaglia d'oro della Società Dante Alighieri)	Florian Henckel von Donnersmarck	Won
Denver Film Festival	Starz People's Choice Awards for Best Feature	Lives of Others (sic)	Won
Deutsche Film- und Medienbewertung	Rated: Most Valuable (Prädikat besonders wertvoll)	The Lives of Others (Das Leben der Anderen)	Won
Deutsche Filmakademie	German Film Award in Gold for Best Feature Film (Deutscher Filmpreis in Gold für Bester Spielfilm)	The Lives of Others (Das Leben der Anderen)	Won
Deutsche Filmakademie	German Film Award in Gold for Best Director (Deutscher Filmpreis in Gold für Beste Regie)	Florian Henckel von Donnersmarck	Won
Deutsche Filmakademie	German Film Award in Gold for Best Screenplay (Deutscher Filmpreis in Gold für Beste Drehbuch)	Florian Henckel von Donnersmarck	Won
Deutsche Filmakademie	German Film Award in Gold for Best Performance by an Actor in a Leading Role (Deutscher Filmpreis in Gold für Beste darstellerische Leistung - Männliche Hauptrolle)	Ulrich Mühe	Won
Deutsche Filmakademie	German Film Award in Gold for Best Performance by an Actor in a Supporting Role (Deutscher Filmpreis in Gold für Beste darstellerische Leistung - Männliche Nebenrolle)	Ulrich Tukur	Won
Deutsche Filmakademie	German Film Award in Gold for Best Cinematography (Deutscher Filmpreis in Gold für Beste Kamera/Bildgestaltung)	Hagen Bogdanski	Won
Deutsche Filmakademie	German Film Award in Gold for Best Production Design (Deutscher Filmpreis in Gold für Bestes Szenenbild)	Silke Buhr	Won
European Film Academy	European Film Award for Best Film	The Lives of Others (Das Leben der Anderen)	Won
European Film Academy	European Film Award for Best Actor	Ulrich Mühe	Won
European Film Academy	European Film Award for Best Screenwriter	Florian Henckel von Donnersmarck	Won
European Film Academy	European Film Award for Best Director	Florian Henckel von Donnersmarck	Nominated
European Film Academy	European Film Award for Best Actress	Martina Gedeck	Nominated
European Film Academy	European Film Award for Best Composer	Gabriel Yared, Stéphane Moucha	Nominated
Festival du nouveau cinéma	Radio-Canada People's Choice Award	The Lives of Others	Won
Film Critics Circle of Australia	FCCA Award for Best Foreign Language Film	The Lives of Others	Won
Foreign Press Association (L’Associazione della Stampa Estera)	Golden Globe - Best European Film (Globo d'oro - Miglior Film Europeo)	The Lives of Others (Le vite degli altri)	Won
Foreign Press Association (L’Associazione della Stampa Estera)	Golden Globe - Best European Actor (Miglior Attore Europeo)	Sebastian Koch	Won
Foreign Press Association (L’Associazione della Stampa Estera)	Golden Globe - Best Distributor (Miglior Distributore)	01 Distribution	Won
German Film Critics Association (Verband der Deutschen Filmkritik)	German Film Critics Award - Best Feature Film Debut (Preis der deutschen Filmkritik - Bestes Spielfilmdebüt)	The Lives of Others (Das Leben der Anderen)	Won
German Film Critics Association (Verband der Deutschen Filmkritik)	German Film Critics Award - Best Actor (Bester Darstellar)	Ulrich Mühe	Won
German Film Critics Association (Verband der Deutschen Filmkritik)	German Film Critics Award - Best Cinematography (Beste Kamera)	Hagen Bogdanski	Won
German Film Critics Association (Verband der Deutschen Filmkritik)	German Film Critics Award - Best Editing (Bester Schnitt)	Patricia Rommel	Nominated
Goldene Henne	Golden Hen for "Current Film" (Goldene Henne für "Film aktuell")	Ulrich Mühe	Won
High Falls Film Festival	Audience Choice for Best Feature	The Lives of Others	Won
Hollywood Foreign Press Association	Golden Globe Award for Best Foreign Language Film	The Lives of Others	Nominated
Independent Spirit Awards	Best Foreign Film	Florian Henckel von Donnersmarck - Director - The Lives of Others	Won
International Film Festival Cinematik	Award from the President of Slovakia's Trnava Region (Cena predsedu Trnavského samosprávneho kraja)	The Lives of Others (Životy tých druhých)	Won
International Film Festival Cinematik	Audience Award (Cena divákov)	The Lives of Others (Životy tých druhých)	Won
Irish Film & Television Academy	Irish Film & Television Award for Best International Film	The Lives of Others	Won
Irish Film & Television Academy	Irish Film & Television Award for Best International Actor	Ulrich Mühe	Nominated
Italian-German Association (Associazione Italia-Germania)	Capo Circeo Award (Premio Capo Circeo)	Florian Henckel von Donnersmarck	Won
Italian National Syndicate of Film Journalists (Sindacato Nazionale Giornalisti Cinematografici Italiani)	European Silver Ribbon (Nastro d'Argento Europeo)	Martina Gedeck	Won
Locarno International Film Festival	Audience Award (Prix du Public UBS)	The Lives of Others	Won
London Film Critics' Circle	ALFS Award for Best Foreign Language Film of the Year	The Lives of Others	Won
London Film Critics' Circle	ALFS Award for Best Screenwriter of the Year	Florian Henckel von Donnersmarck	Won
London Film Festival	Satyajit Ray Award	Florian Henckel von Donnersmarck	Won
Los Angeles Film Critics Association	Best Foreign-Language Film	The Lives of Others	Won
New York Film Critics Circle	NYFCC Award for Best Foreign Film	The Lives of Others	Won
Online Film Critics Society	Best Foreign Language Film	The Lives of Others	Nominated
Palm Springs International Film Festival	Audience Choice Award - Best Narrative Feature	The Lives of Others	Won
Polish Film Academy	Polish Film Award - Eagle for Best European Film (Orzeł dla Najlepszy Film Europejski)	The Lives of Others (Życie na podsłuchu)	Won
Portland International Film Festival	PIFF 30 Audience Award for Best Feature	The Lives of Others	Won
Portland International Film Festival	PIFF 30 Audience Award for Best New Director	Florian Henckel von Donnersmarck	Won
Rotterdam International Film Festival	UPC Audience Award	The Lives of Others (Das Leben der Anderen)	Won
Sarasota Film Festival	Breakaway Award	Florian Henckel von Donnersmarck	Won
SESC Top Movies Festival (Festival SESC Melhores Filmes)	Best Foreign Film, by audience vote (Melhor Filme Estrangeiro)	The Lives of Others (A Vida Dos Outros)	Won
Seville Film Festival (Sevilla Festival de Cine)	Silver Giraldillo (Giraldillo de Plata)	The Lives of Others	Won
Swedish Film Institute	Guldbagge Award for Best Foreign Film (Svensk Guldbagge För Bästa Utländska Film)	The Lives of Others (De andras liv)	Won
Toronto Film Critics Association	Best Foreign Language Film	The Lives of Others	Nominated
Vancouver International Film Festival	People's Choice Award for Most Popular International Film	The Lives of Others (Das Leben der Anderen)	Won
Verwertungsgesellschaft für Nutzungsrechte an Filmwerken	Young Producers Prize (Nachwuchsproduzentenpreis)	Wiedemann & Berg Filmproduktion GmbH	Won
Vilnius International Film Festival	The Audience Award	The Lives of Others (Das Leben der Anderen)	Won
Warsaw International Film Festival	Audience Award	The Lives of Others	Won
Zagreb Film Festival	Golden Pram for Best Feature Film	The Lives of Others (Das Leben der Anderen)	Won
Zeitschrift Cinema (Cinema Magazine)	Jupiter Award - Best German Actor (Bester deutscher Darsteller)	Ulrich Mühe	Won
