= Iveta Malachovská =

Slovak television presenter and actress (born 1965)

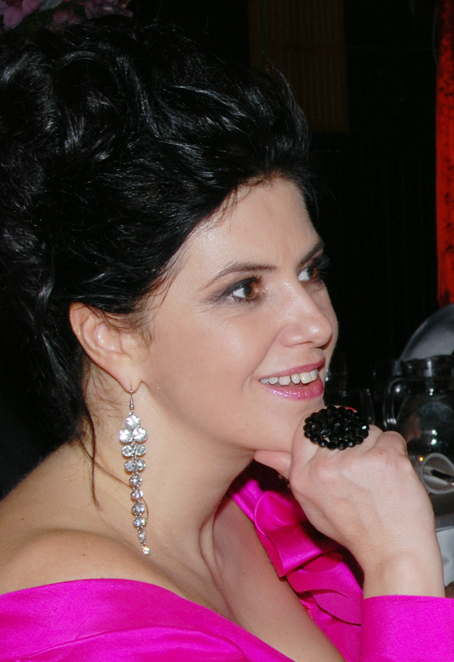
- Malachovská in 2011
- Born: Iveta Pašková; 11 May 1965 (age 59); Bratislava, Czechoslovakia
- Occupation: TV presenter
- Years active: 1989-current

Iveta Malachovská (née Pašková; born 11 May 1965) is a Slovak television presenter and actress. She has presented television programmes on stations including Czechoslovak Television, Slovenská televízia (STV) and Markíza. Malachovská has hosted the Slovak versions of The Biggest Loser and Who Wants to Be a Millionaire?.

== Career ==
Malachovská studied at the Film and TV School of the Academy of Performing Arts in Prague and later worked for Czechoslovak Television and Slovenská televízia. Her presenting debut came in 1989 with the programme Úsmev ako dar. As an actress, she played a role in the 1990 film Island of the Long Ears. She also played a minor role in the 1997 Martin Šulík film Orbis Pictus. Malachovská first presented Slovak Footballer of the Year in 1995, going on to present it a record eight times.

Malachovská joined private television network Markíza in 1996, staying until 2006. During her time at Markíza she presented programmes including Doma s Markízou and Hodina pravdy. She returned to Slovenská televízia in 2006, going on to host the reality show SuperTelo, the Slovak version of The Biggest Loser. She subsequently fronted the Slovak version of Who Wants to Be a Millionaire? between 2007 and its final episode on 29 March 2008.

Malachovská functioned as co-producer on the 2008 Václav Marhoul film Tobruk.

== Personal life ==
Born in Bratislava as Iveta Pašková, she married opera singer Martin Malachovský in 1993. The couple has a daughter together called Kristína. Malachovská has a sister who is two years older.
