= Mojado Power =

1981 film

- Directed by: Alfonso Arau
- Written by: Alfonso Arau; Emilio Carballido
- Starring: Alfonso Arau
- Release date: 4 December 1981
- Running time: 108 minutes
- Country: Mexico
- Language: Spanish

Mojado Power (Spanish: El mojado remojado) is a 1981 Mexican comedy film directed by and starring Alfonso Arau. The film was submitted as the Mexican entry for the Best Foreign Language Film at the 54th Academy Awards, but was not accepted as a nominee.

== Cast ==
- Alfonso Arau as Nato Solís
- Blanca Guerra as Xochitl
- Pedro Damián as Joe
- Priscilla Garcia as Tina
- Nono Arsu as Jacobo
- Socorro Bonilla as Daisy

== See also ==
- List of submissions to the 54th Academy Awards for Best Foreign Language Film
- List of Mexican submissions for the Academy Award for Best Foreign Language Film
