= The Divine Emma =

1979 film

- Theatrical release poster
- Original title: Božská Ema
- Directed by: Jiří Krejčík
- Screenplay by: Zdeněk Mahler
- Produced by: Jan Syrový
- Starring: Božidara Turzonovová
- Cinematography: Miroslav Ondříček
- Edited by: Miroslav Hájek
- Music by: Zdeněk Liška
- Production company: Barrandov Studios
- Release date: 1 December 1979 (Czech Republic)
- Running time: 110 minutes
- Country: Czechoslovakia
- Language: Czech

The Divine Emma (Czech: Božská Ema) is a 1979 Czech drama film directed by Jiří Krejčík. The film was selected as the Czechoslovak entry for the Best Foreign Language Film at the 54th Academy Awards, but was not accepted as a nominee.

== Plot ==
The film is a biographical account of operatic soprano Emmy Destinn's life. The primary focus is on the singer's return from the United States in 1914 and her subsequent involvement in the Czech patriotic resistance against Austria-Hungary during World War I.

== Cast ==
- Božidara Turzonovová – Emmy Destinn (sung by Gabriela Beňačková)
- Juraj Kukura – Victor
- Miloš Kopecký – Samuel
- Jiří Adamíra – Colonel
- Václav Lohniský – Train dispatcher

== See also ==
- List of submissions to the 54th Academy Awards for Best Foreign Language Film
- List of Czechoslovak submissions for the Academy Award for Best Foreign Language Film
