= Jiří Krejčík =

Czech film director (1918–2013)

- Born: 26 June 1918; Prague, Austria-Hungary (now in the Czech Republic)
- Died: 8 August 2013 (aged 95); Prague, Czech Republic
- Occupation(s): Film director, screenwriter, actor

Jiří Krejčík (Czech pronunciation: [ˈjɪr̝iː ˈkrɛjtʃiːk]; 26 June 1918 – 8 August 2013) was a Czech film director, screenwriter and actor.

Born in 1918 in Prague, he began his film career as an extra for Barrandov Studios, during World War II. He then began creating short films and commercials. His first directorial feature film was 1947's A Week in the Quiet House (Týden v tichém domě), in which he wrote the screenplay based on the short stories of Jan Neruda. In 1948, he directed Border Village (Ves v pohraničí) about a coal-mining village on the Czech border after World War II. He also wrote and directed different segments of the 1959 film Of Things Supernatural (O věcech nadpřirozených), which won him Special Mention at the Locarno International Film Festival. His other films of note are The Emperor and the Golem (Císařův pekař a pekařův císař) (1951), from which he was replaced, and Divine Emma (Božská Ema) (1979), which would be considered for the list of submissions to the 54th Academy Awards for Best Foreign Language Film. He would continue writing for film until 2003 and directing until 2010. He also acted in films, such as 1999's Cosy Dens (Pelíšky), as well as in television series.

Krejčík died on 8 August 2013 in a Prague hospital.

== Awards ==
- Won: Locarno International Film Festival Special Mention for Of Things Supernatural (O vecech nadprirozených) (1959)
- Won: Czech Lion Artistic Achievement Award (1999)
- Won: Karlovy Vary International Film Festival Special Prize for Outstanding Contribution to World Cinema (2005)
- Nominated: Jihlava International Documentary Film Festival Best Czech Documentary Award for Graduation in November (Maturita v listopadu) (2000)
