= List of Portuguese films of 2020 =

A list of Portuguese films that were first released in 2020. Due to the COVID-19 pandemic there were significantly less films released than previous years.

Release date	Title	Director	Cast	Genre	Notes	Ref
January 16	Alva	Ico Costa		Crime, drama		
January 23	O Filme do Bruno Aleixo	João Moreira, Pedro Santo		Comedy		
July 2	Faz-me Companhia	Gonçalo Almeida		Horror, mystery, thriller	The big gap in between releases is due to the COVID-19 pandemic.	
July 9	Surdina	Rodrigo Areias		Comedy		
July 9	Cães que Ladram aos Pássaros	Sofia Bost, Mariana Gaivão, Leonor Teles		Short		
July 23	Patrick	Gonçalo Waddington		Drama		
July 30	Zé Pedro Rock'n'Roll	Diogo Varela Silva		Documentary, biography		
August 6	A Impossibilidade de Estar Só	Sérgio Graciano		Drama		
August 13	Golpe de Sol	Vicente Alves do Ó		Drama, romance		
September 10	Ordem Moral	Mário Barroso		Drama		
September 17	Os Conselhos da Noite	José Oliveira		Drama		
September 17	O Fim do Mundo	Basil da Cunha		Action, crime, drama		
October 1	The Year of the Death of Ricardo Reis	João Botelho		Drama		
October 15	Um Animal Amarelo	Filipe Bragança		Drama, fantasy		
October 22	Listen	Ana Rocha de Sousa		Drama		
November 5	Donzela Guerreira	Marta Pessoa		Drama		
November 12	Amor Fati	Cláudia Varejão		Drama		
November 19	O Nosso Cônsul em Havana	Francisco Manso		Drama		
December 10	Sério Fernandes - O Mestre da Escola do Porto	Rui Garrdio		Documentary, biography		

== See also ==
- 2020 in Portugal
