= List of submissions to the 54th Academy Awards for Best Foreign Language Film =

1981 Best Foreign Language Film submissions

Highlights
- Oscar winner: (Hungary) Mephisto
- Submissions: 25
- Debuts: none

This is a list of submissions to the 54th Academy Awards for Best Foreign Language Film. The Academy Award for Best Foreign Language Film was created in 1956 by the Academy of Motion Picture Arts and Sciences to honour non-English-speaking films produced outside the United States. The award is handed out annually, and is accepted by the winning film's director, although it is considered an award for the submitting country as a whole. Countries are invited by the Academy to submit their best films for competition according to strict rules, with only one film being accepted from each country.

For the 54th Academy Awards, twenty-five films were submitted in the category Academy Award for Best Foreign Language Film. The five nominated films came from Italy, Japan, Poland and Switzerland.

Although Pixote was accepted as the Brazilian submission for the Academy Award for Best Foreign Language Film it was later disqualified since it was test marketed in Brazil before the allowable date.

Hungary won for the first time with Mephisto by István Szabó.

== Submissions ==
Submitting country	Film title used in nomination	Original title	Language(s)	Director(s)	Result
Argentina	The Underground Man	El hombre del subsuelo	Spanish	Nicolás Sarquís	Not nominated
Austria	Der Bockerer	Der Bockerer	German	Franz Antel	Not nominated
Belgium	Le Grand Paysage d'Alexis Droeven		French	Jean-Jacques Andrien	Not nominated
Brazil	Pixote	Pixote, a Lei do Mais Fraco	Portuguese	Héctor Babenco	Disqualified
Canada	Les Plouffe		French, English	Gilles Carle	Not nominated
Czechoslovakia	The Divine Emma	Božská Ema	Czech	Jiří Krejčík	Not nominated
Egypt	People on the Top	أهل القمة	Egyptian Arabic	Aly Badrakhan	Not nominated
Finland	Sign of the Beast	Pedon Merkki	Finnish	Jaakko Pakkasvirta	Not nominated
France	Diva		French, English	Jean-Jacques Beineix	Not nominated
West Germany	Lili Marleen		German	Rainer Werner Fassbinder	Not nominated
Greece	The Man with the Carnation	Ο άνθρωπος με το γαρίφαλο	Greek	Nikos Tzimas	Not nominated
Hungary	Mephisto		Hungarian, German, English, Esperanto	István Szabó	Won Academy Award
Iceland	Outlaw: The Saga of Gisli	Útlaginn	Icelandic	Ágúst Guðmundsson	Not nominated
Israel	A Thousand Little Kisses	אלף נשיקות קטנות	Hebrew	Mira Recanati	Not nominated
Italy	Three Brothers	Tre fratelli	Italian	Francesco Rosi	Nominated
Japan	Muddy River	泥の川	Japanese	Kōhei Oguri	Nominated
Mexico	Mojado Power		Spanish	Alfonso Arau	Not nominated
Netherlands	Come-Back!		Dutch	Jonne Severijn	Not nominated
Norway	Julia Julia		Norwegian	Petter Vennerød and Svend Wam	Not nominated
Poland	Man of Iron	Człowiek z żelaza	Polish	Andrzej Wajda	Nominated
Soviet Union	O, Sport, You – the Peace!	О спорт, ты - мир!	Russian	Yuri Ozerov	Not nominated
Spain	National Heritage	Patrimonio nacional	Spanish	Luis García Berlanga	Not nominated
Sweden	Children's Island	Barnens ö	Swedish	Kay Pollak	Not nominated
Switzerland	The Boat Is Full	Das Boot ist Voll	German, Swiss German, French	Markus Imhoof	Nominated
Taiwan	If I Were for Real	假如我是真的	Mandarin	Wang Toon	Not nominated
Yugoslavia	Do You Remember Dolly Bell?	Sjećaš li se Dolly Bell?	Serbo-Croatian	Emir Kusturica	Not nominated

== Sources ==
- Margaret Herrick Library, Academy of Motion Picture Arts and Sciences
