= Peter Karvaš =

Slovak writer and dramaturg

Peter Karvaš (25 April 1920 − 28 November 1999) was a Slovak writer.

== Life ==
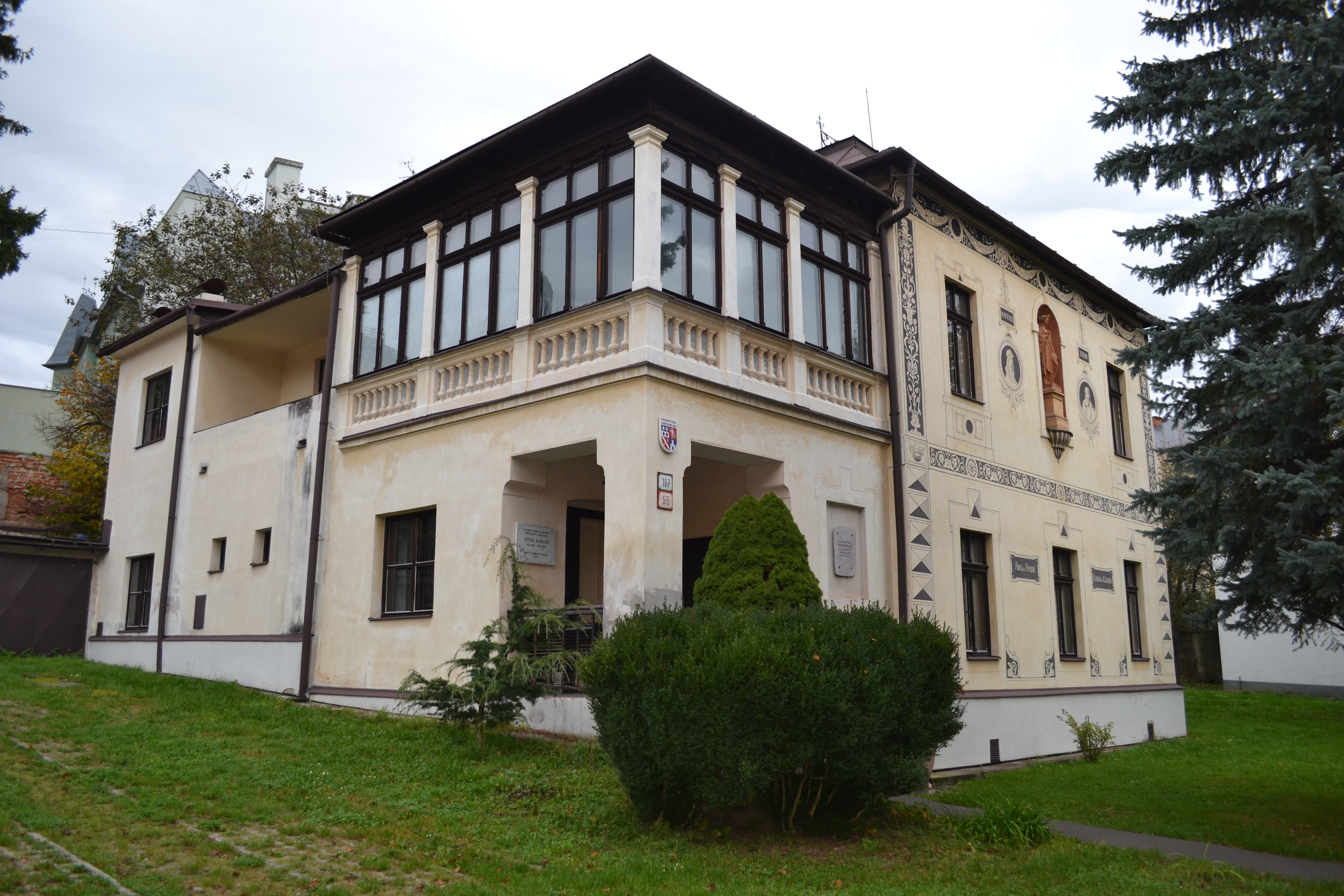
Birthplace of Karvaš

Karvaš was born on 25 April 1920 in Banská Bystrica. He was a philosopher, theatre scholar, dramaturg and diplomat. In 1968 he was banned from publishing as a result of the Prague Spring. Karvaš became known above all for his plays, of which the Mitternachtsmesse (Midnight Mass) was also successfully performed in Germany. In addition, there is an equally remarkable prose work and numerous theoretical works in the field of theatre studies and philosophy.

Karvaš died in 1999 in Bratislava at the age of 79.

== Work ==
=== Theatre plays ===
- Mitternachtsmesse. (Drama with prologue in three acts (five scenes))
- Die grosse Perücke. (Comedy in two parts with epilogue (eleven scenes))
- Antigone und die Anderen, (tragedy in 3 acts and 2 interludes)
- Ein Königreich für einen Mörder, (Comedy)
- Menschen unserer Straße, (play in four scenes)
- Diplomaten, (three-act comedy)
- Patient hundertdreizehn, (five act comedy)
- Meteor, (drama in three acts)
- Sieben Zeugen, (one-act play)
- Die Umfrage, (one-act play)
- Das Verbot, (Play in 2 parts and 6 scenes))
- List of 15 plays in the German National Library.

=== Prose ===
- Tanz der Salome, Apokryphen
- Teufeleien
- Unvollendete für Kinderstimme
