= List of plays by Nestroy =

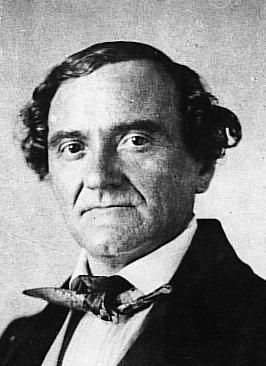
Johann Nestroy in 1862

This is a complete list of the plays of the Austrian singer-actor-playwright Johann Nestroy (1801–1862).

== Genres ==
Out of the 83 recorded works of Nestroy, a total of some 56 were designated as some form of Posse, meaning a farce or 'broad comedy', including 32 Possen mit Gesang (farce with singing). There are eight Parodien, or parodies (two of them also designated as Possen), plus two Burlesken and one 'Travestie'). There are 6 Zauberspiele and 4 Quodlibet, 2 Vorspiele (prologues) and also one each of the following: Dramatisches Gemälde ('dramatic picture'), Historisch-romantisches Drama ('historical-romantic drama'), Intermezzo, Komische Szenenreihe ('comic parade'), Operette, and Schwank ('humorous story').

== List ==
Title	Genre	Subdivisions	Music	Première date	Place, theatre	Notes
Sieben Mädchen in Uniform (Zwölf Mädchen in Uniform)	Posse	1 act		5 December 1827	Graz	
Der Zettelträger Papp	Vorspiel			15 December 1827	Graz	
Dreissig Jahre aus dem Leben eines Lumpen	Lokales Zauberspiel with dance, song and tableaux	2 acts	Adolf Müller and Franz Roser	20 December 1828	Graz	
Der Einsilbige oder Ein dummer Diener seines Herrn	Schwank	1 act		16 January 1829	Graz	
Der Tod am Hochzeitstage oder Mann, Frau, Kind	Zauberspiel	2 acts		18 August 1829	Vienna, Theater in der Josefstadt	
Der unzusammenhängende Zusammenhang	Quodlibet	2 acts		28 January 1830	Graz	
Magische Eilwagenreise durch die Komödienwelt				13 March 1830	Pressburg	
Zwei Schüsseln voll Faschingskrapfen	Quodlibet	2 acts		12 February 1831	Pressburg	
Der gefühlvolle Kerkermeister oder Adelheid die verfolgte Wittib	Gesprochene und gesungene Parodie eines getanzten Dramas	3 acts		7 February 1832	Vienna, Theater an der Wien	
Nagerl und Handschuh	Neue Parodie	3 acts	Adolf Müller	23 March 1832	Vienna, Theater an der Wien	parody of Isouard's Cendrillion and Rossini's Cenerentola
Humoristische Eilwagenreise durch die Theaterwelt	Quodlibet	2 acts		23 May 1832	Vienna, Theater an der Wien	
Zampa der Tagdieb oder die Braut von Gips	Parodie	3 acts	Adolf Müller	22 June 1832	Vienna, Theater an der Wien	parody of Ferdinand Hérold's Zampa
Der konfuse Zauberer	Original Zauberspiel mit Gesang	3 acts	Adolf Müller	26 September 1832	Vienna, Theater an der Wien	
Die Zauberreise in die Ritterzeit	Original Zauberposse	3 acts with a prologue	Adolf Müller	20 October 1832	Vienna, Theater an der Wien	
Genius, Schuster und Marqueur	Zauberposse	3 acts				Written in 1832
Der Feenball	Faschingsposse	3 acts				first version of Der böse Geist Lumpazivagabundus
Der böse Geist Lumpazivagabundus	Zauberposse mit Gesang	3 acts	Adolf Müller	11 April 1833	Vienna, Theater an der Wien	
Robert der Teuxel	Parodierende Zauberposse	2 (3) acts	Adolf Müller	9 October 1833	Vienna, Theater an der Wien	parody of Meyerbeer's Robert le diable
Der Tritschtratsch	Lokalposse mit Gesang	2 acts	Adolf Müller	20 November 1833	Vienna, Theater an der Wien	
Der Zauberer Sulphurelectrimagnetikophosphoratus	Zauberposse mit Gesang	3 acts		17 January 1834	Vienna, Theater an der Wien	parody of Ernst Raupach's Robert der Teufel
Müller, Kohlenbrenner und Sesseltrager	Zauberspiel	3 acts	Adolf Müller	4 April 1834	Vienna, Theater an der Wien	
Das Verlobungsfest im Feenreiche	Zauberposse	3 acts				Written in 1834
Die Gleichheit der Jahre	Lokalposse	4 parts	Adolf Müller	8 October 1834	Vienna, Theater an der Wien	
Die Familien Zwirn, Knieriem und Leim	Zauberspiel	2 acts	Adolf Müller	5 November 1834	Vienna, Theater an der Wien	
Die Fahrt mit dem Dampfwagen	Vorspiel			5 December 1834	Vienna, Theater an der Wien	
Weder Lorbeerbaum noch Bettelstab	Parodierende Posse	3 acts		13 February 1835	Vienna, Theater an der Wien	parody of von Holteis Lorbeerbaum und Bettelstab.
Eulenspiegel	Posse	4 acts	Adolf Müller	22 April 1835	Vienna, Theater an der Wien	
Zu ebener Erde und im ersten Stock	Lokalposse mit Gesang	3 acts	Adolf Müller	24 September 1835	Vienna, Theater an der Wien	
Der Treulose	Dramatisches Gemälde	2 parts (three acts)	Adolf Müller	5 March 1836	Vienna, Theater an der Wien	
Die beiden Nachtwandler	Posse mit Gesang	2 acts	Adolf Müller	6 May 1836	Vienna, Theater an der Wien	
Affe und Bräutigam	Posse mit Gesang	3 acts	Georg Ott	23 July 1836	Vienna, Theater an der Wien	
Eine Wohnung ist zu vermieten in der Stadt	Lokalposse mit Gesang	3 acts	Adolf Müller	17 January 1837	Vienna, Theater an der Wien	
Moppels Abenteuer	Posse	2 acts	Adolf Müller	5 May 1837	Vienna, Theater an der Wien	
Das Haus der Temperamente	Posse	2 acts	Adolf Müller	16 November 1837	Vienna, Theater an der Wien	
Glück, Missbrauch und Rückkehr	Posse	5 acts	Adolf Müller	10 March 1838	Vienna, Theater an der Wien	
Der Kobold	Parodierende Zauberposse mit Gesang	4 acts	Adolf Müller	19 April 1838	Vienna, Theater an der Wien	
Gegen Torheit gibt es kein Mittel	Lustiges Trauerspiel mit Gesang	3 parts	Adolf Müller	3 November 1838	Vienna, Theater an der Wien	
Die verhängnisvolle Faschingsnacht	Lokalposse mit Gesang	3 acts	Adolf Müller	13 April 1839	Vienna, Theater an der Wien	
Der Färber und sein Zwillingsbruder	Posse mit Gesang	3 acts	Adolf Müller	15 January 1840	Vienna, Theater an der Wien	
Der Erbschleicher	Posse mit Gesang	4 acts	Adolf Müller	21 May 1840	Vienna, Theater an der Wien	
Der Talisman	Posse mit Gesang	3 acts	Adolf Müller	16 December 1840	Vienna, Theater an der Wien	
Das Mädl aus der Vorstadt	Posse mit Gesang	3 acts	Adolf Müller	24 November 1841	Vienna, Theater an der Wien	
Prinz Friedrich	Historisch-romantisches Drama	5 acts	Adolf Müller	18 December 1841	Vienna, Theater an der Wien	
Einen Jux will er sich machen	Posse mit Gesang	3 acts	Adolf Müller	10 March 1842	Vienna, Theater an der Wien	
Die Ereignisse im Gasthofe	Komische Szenenreihe	1 act		3 May 1842	Vienna, Theater an der Wien	
Die Papiere des Teufels	Posse mit Gesang	3 acts and a prologue	Adolf Müller	17 November 1842	Vienna, Theater an der Wien	
Liebesgeschichten und Heiratssachen	Posse mit Gesang	3 acts	Michael Hebenstreit	23 March 1843	Vienna, Theater an der Wien	
Das Quodlibet verschiedener Jahrhunderte	Scenen- und Personen-Durcheinander aus mehreren Stücken.	3 parts, together with a prologue in 1 act: Die dramatischen Zimmerherrn		12 May 1843	Vienna, Theater an der Wien	
Nur Ruhe!	Posse mit Gesang	3 acts	Adolf Müller	17 November 1843	Vienna, Theater an der Wien	
Eisenbahnheiraten	Posse mit Gesang	3 acts	Andreas Skutta	3 January 1844	Vienna, Theater an der Wien	
Hinüber Herüber	Intermezzo			16 March 1844	Vienna, Theater an der Wien	
Der Zerrissene	Posse mit Gesang	3 acts	Adolf Müller	9 April 1844	Vienna, Theater an der Wien	
Die beiden Herren Söhne	Posse mit Gesang	4 acts	Adolf Müller	16 January 1845	Vienna, Theater an der Wien	
Das Gewürzkrämerkleeblatt	Posse mit Gesang	3 acts	Adolf Müller	26 February 1845	Vienna, Theater an der Wien	
Unverhofft	Posse mit Gesang	3 acts	Adolf Müller	23 April 1845	Vienna, Theater an der Wien	
Der Unbedeutende	Posse mit Gesang	3 acts	Adolf Müller	2 May 1846	Vienna, Theater an der Wien	
Zwei ewige Juden und Keiner	Burleske	2 acts	Adolf Müller	4 August 1846	Vienna, Theater in der Leopoldstadt	
Der Schützling	Posse mit Gesang	4 acts	Adolf Müller	9 April 1847	Vienna, Theater in der Leopoldstadt	
Die schlimmen Buben in der Schule	Burleske mit Gesang	1 act	Michael Hebenstreit	10 December 1847	Vienna, Carltheater	
Martha oder Die Mischmonder Markt-Mägde-Mietung	Parodierende Posse mit Gesang	3 acts	Michael Hebenstreit	25 January 1848	Vienna, Carltheater	parody of Friedrich von Flotow's Martha
Die Anverwandten	Posse mit Gesang	5 acts	Michael Hebenstreit	25 May 1848	Vienna, Carltheater	
Freiheit in Krähwinkel	Posse mit Gesang	2 parts (three acts)	Michael Hebenstreit	1 July 1848	Vienna, Carltheater	
Lady und Schneider	Posse mit Gesang	2 acts	Michael Hebenstreit	6 February 1849	Vienna, Carltheater	
Judith und Holofernes	Travestie	1 act	Michael Hebenstreit	13 March 1849	Vienna, Carltheater	
Höllenangst	Posse mit Gesang	3 acts	Michael Hebenstreit	17 November 1849	Vienna, Carltheater	Music by Hanns Eisler written in 1948
Sie sollen ihn nicht haben, oder Der holländische Bauer	Faschingsposse mit Gesang	2 acts	Michael Hebenstreit	12 January 1850	Vienna, Carltheater	
Karikaturen-Charivari mit Heiratszweck	Posse mit Gesang	3 acts	Michael Hebenstreit	1 April 1850	Vienna, Carltheater	
Alles will den Propheten sehen	Posse mit Gesang	3 acts	Carl Franz Stenzel	4 May 1850	Vienna, Carltheater	
Verwickelte Geschichte	Posse mit Gesang	2 acts	Carl Franz Stenzel	22 June 1850	Vienna, Carltheater	
Mein Freund	Posse mit Gesang	3 acts and a prologue	Carl Franz Stenzel	4 April 1851	Vienna, Carltheater	
Der gemütliche Teufel	Zauberspiel mit Gesang und Tanz	1 act	Karl Binder	20 December 1851	Vienna, Carltheater	
Kampl	Posse mit Gesang	3 acts	Karl Binder	29 March 1852	Vienna, Carltheater	
Heimliches Geld, heimliche Liebe	Posse mit Gesang	3 acts	Karl Binder	16 March 1853	Vienna, Carltheater	
Theaterg’schichten durch Liebe, Intrige, Geld und Dummheit	Posse mit Gesang	2 acts	Karl Binder	1 February 1854	Vienna, Carltheater	
Umsonst	Posse mit Gesang und Tanz	3 acts	Karl Binder	7 March 1857	Vienna, Carltheater	
Tannhäuser	Zukunftsposse	3 acts	Karl Binder	31 October 1857	Vienna, Carltheater	parody on Wagner's opera
Ein gebildeter Hausknecht	Posse	1 act		11 September 1858	Vienna, Carltheater	
Lohengrin	Musikalisch-Dramatische Parodie	4 scenes	Karl Binder	31 March 1859	Vienna, Carltheater	parody on Wagner's opera
Frühere Verhältnisse	Posse mit Gesang	1 act	Anton M. Storch	7 January 1862	Vienna, Quai-Theater	
Häuptling Abendwind	Operetta	1 act	Offenbach	1 February 1862	Vienna, Quai-Theater	adaptation of Philippe Gille's text for Offenbach's 1859 Vent du soir
Der alte Mann mit der jungen Frau	Posse mit Gesang	4 acts	Michael Hebenstreit	24 October 1890	Vienna, Deutsches Volkstheater	Written in 1849
Nur keck!	Posse mit Gesang	3 acts		2 July 1943	Vienna, Burgtheater	Written in 1856
Zeitvertreib	Posse	1 act				Written in 1858
