= Eva Kristínová =

Slovak actress (1928–2020)

- Born: 5 August 1928; Trenčín, Czechoslovakia
- Died: 14 June 2020 (aged 91); Bratislava, Slovakia
- Years active: 1950–1985
- Children: 1

Eva Kristinová (5 August 1928 – 14 June 2020) was a Slovak actress and antifascist fighter.

== Early life ==
She was born on 5 August 1928 in Trenčín. Her father Jozef Martin Kristín (1897 – 1970), a former member of the Czechoslovak Legion, was the head of the Trenčín military garrison. He was sentenced to death by the German military court for refusing to surrender military equipment to Wehrmacht, rehabilitated and promoted to the rank of brigadier general after the war and fired from the army and jailed following his refusal to join the Communist Party of Czechoslovakia after the 1948 Czechoslovak coup d'état.

Following the example of her father, Eva Kristinová herself joined the anti-fascist resistance at the age of 16, she served as a courier for the rebel forces in the Slovak National Uprising.

== Career ==
After the end of the war, due to the political persecution of her father, Eva Kristinová was not able to fulfill her plans to study acting abroad. Instead she took acting classes at the Bratislava conservatory and joined the Slovak National Theatre in 1950, where she spent her entire career spanning over nearly 40 years. She retired in 1985.

In addition to theatre, she acted in a number of movies, including Death Is Called Engelchen (1963) and Penelope (1978). She also sang chansons and recited poetry.

== Retirement and death ==
In her final years, Kristinová gradually embraced nationalism. She was the chair of Bratislava Old Town branch of Matica slovenská, a staunch supporter of the independence of Slovakia and the autocratic rule of Vladimír Mečiar. In the late 2000s, she outright supported the far-right movement Slovak Togetherness, which was later banned. She also recited poetry at a mass dedicated to Jozef Tiso, the president of the World War II-era Slovak Republic and convicted war criminal, against whom Kristinová and her father fought in her youth.

Kristinová spent her final years alone. Her only son lived abroad. She died on 14 June 2020 at the retirement home in Bratislava.

== Awards ==
Kristinová was awarded the Order of the Slovak National Uprising, 2nd class for her role in the antifascist resistance. In 2008, the president Ivan Gašparovič awarded her the Order of Ľudovít Štúr, 1st class. This award was controversial because she was a well-known far right supporter at the time.

== Personal life ==
Kristinová was briefly married and had a son, but divorced her husband when their child was just three years old, over his disagreement with her acting career.
