= Božidara Turzonovová =

Slovak actress

Prof. M.A. Božidara Turzonovová PhD.
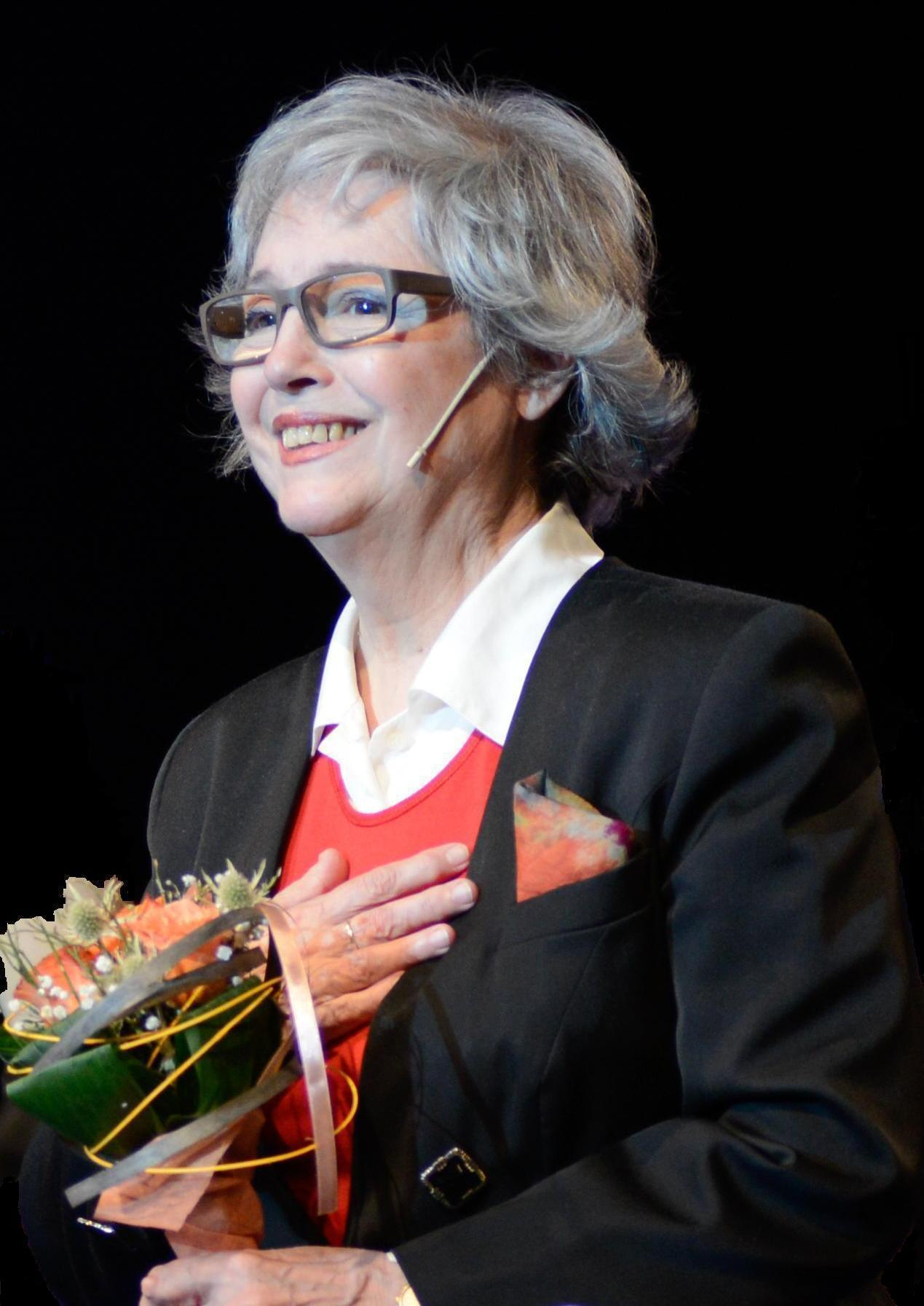
- Photo: Eduard Kudláč
- Born: May 28, 1942 (age 84); Sofia, Kingdom of Bulgaria
- Education: VŠMU, Bratislava (1959–1963)
- Occupations: Actress; professor; dean
- Years active: 1961–present
- Employer(s): SND, Bratislava (since 1963)
- Organizations: VŠMU, Bratislava (1984–1999); AFF, T.Teplice (1993–2004); AU, B.Bystrica (1999–2002); IFFC, Piešťany (since 2006)
- Spouse: Jozef Adamovič (m. 1962; w. 2013)
- Children: 2 daughters
- Website: Slovak National Theater

Signature
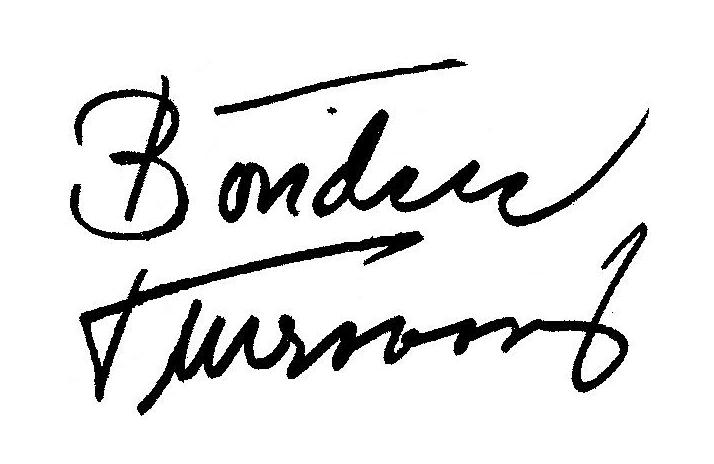

Božidara Turzonovová, (Slovak pronunciation: [ˈbɔʐidara ˈturzɔnɔʋɔvaː]; born on May 28, 1942) is a Slovak film and stage actress of Bulgarian origin, often referred to as The First Lady of Slovak Theater and Film.

The former chairman of the Art Film Fest (AFF) in Trenčianske Teplice, nowadays the president of the International Film Festival Cinematik (IFFC) held in Piešťany (from 2006), Turzonovová is also known as the first dean of the Faculty of Drama at the Academy of Performing Arts in Banská Bystrica (1999–2002), co-established by herself. Since 2009, she occupies the Managing Board of the Academy of Performing Arts in Bratislava and, simultaneously, lectures at the Faculty of Mass Media Communication at the University of Saints Cyril and Methodius in Trnava.

In terms of artistic achievements, the actress is most notable for her portrayal of Emmy Destinn in a Jiří Krejčík's motion picture entitled The Divine Emma (1979). The movie was submitted for the 54th Academy Awards in 1982 in the category Best Foreign Language Film. Most currently, the actress was cast in the Palm Springs International ShortFest-winning film The Lunchbox (2009), which also scored a bronze medal in the narrative category at the 37th Annual Student Academy Awards competition, in 2010.

== Biography ==
=== 1942-60: Early life and education ===
Božidara Turzonovová is a daughter of a female medician from Serbia and a reputable architect with origins in Macedonia (near Thessaloniki). As the oldest of three descendants, she was born in the Kingdom of Bulgaria. After thirteen months spent in Sofia, her mother followed the spouse to Bratislava, where he worked since 1939. From 1943, Turzonovová was therefore raised in Slovakia. According to the actress, she was often called "that Bulgarian" at that time that led her to a state of feeling rather humbled (as she recollected for the Czech Television in 2011). Although she originally planned to study art history at the Palacký University of Olomouc in western part of then-Czechoslovakia, for which she would also apply, Turzonovová continued with drama eventually at the Slovak Academy of Performing Arts. While one of her classmates was Emília Vášáryová, her teacher became Ján Borodáč who taught the Stanislavski's method. However, as the artist later disclosed, she found difficult to couple with partners on the scene, and wanted to abandon the college. In 2012 for SME she said: "For me 'partnering stuff' has always been a problem in acting, especially when I was yet a student."

=== 1961-69: Career beginnings and the National Theater ===
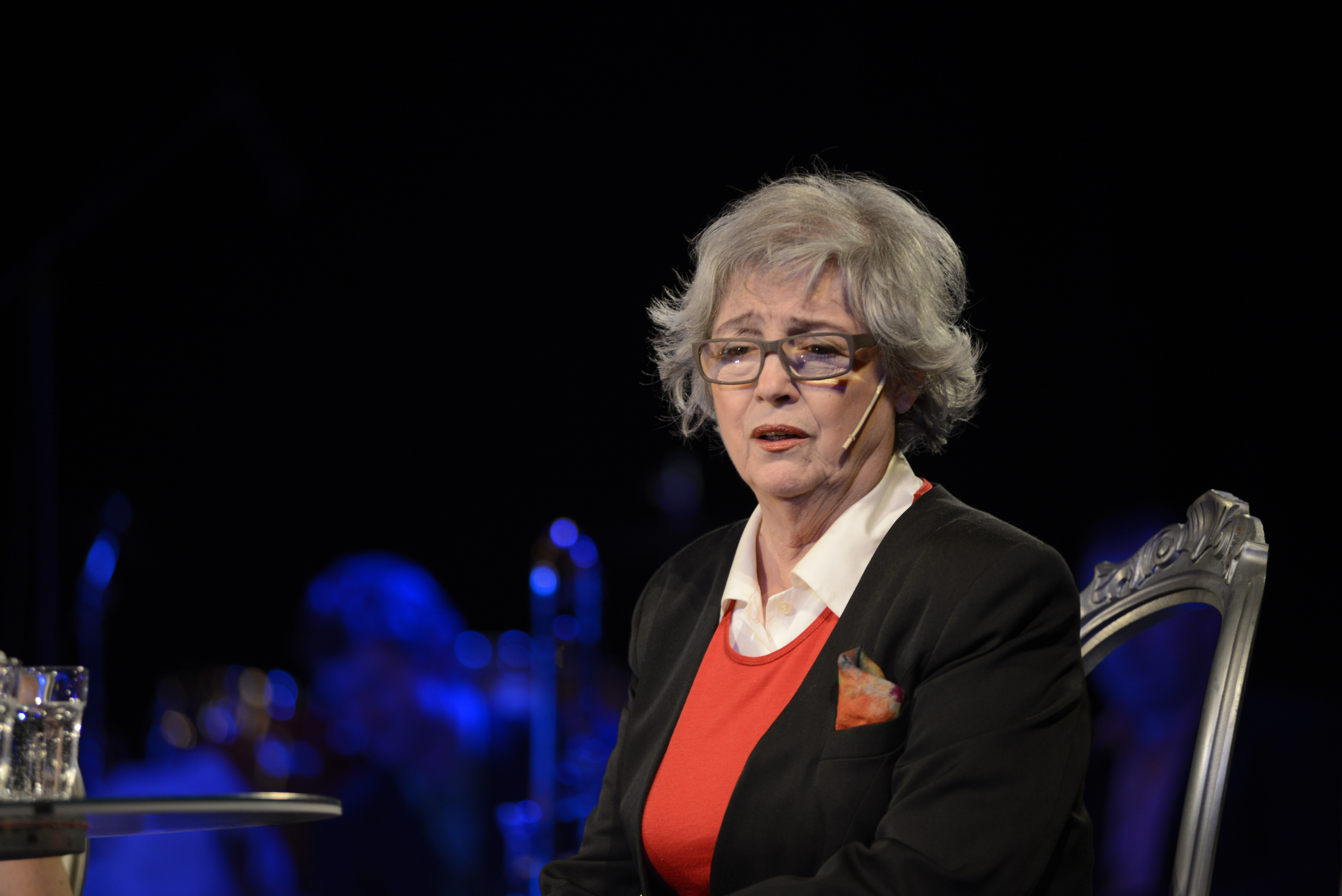
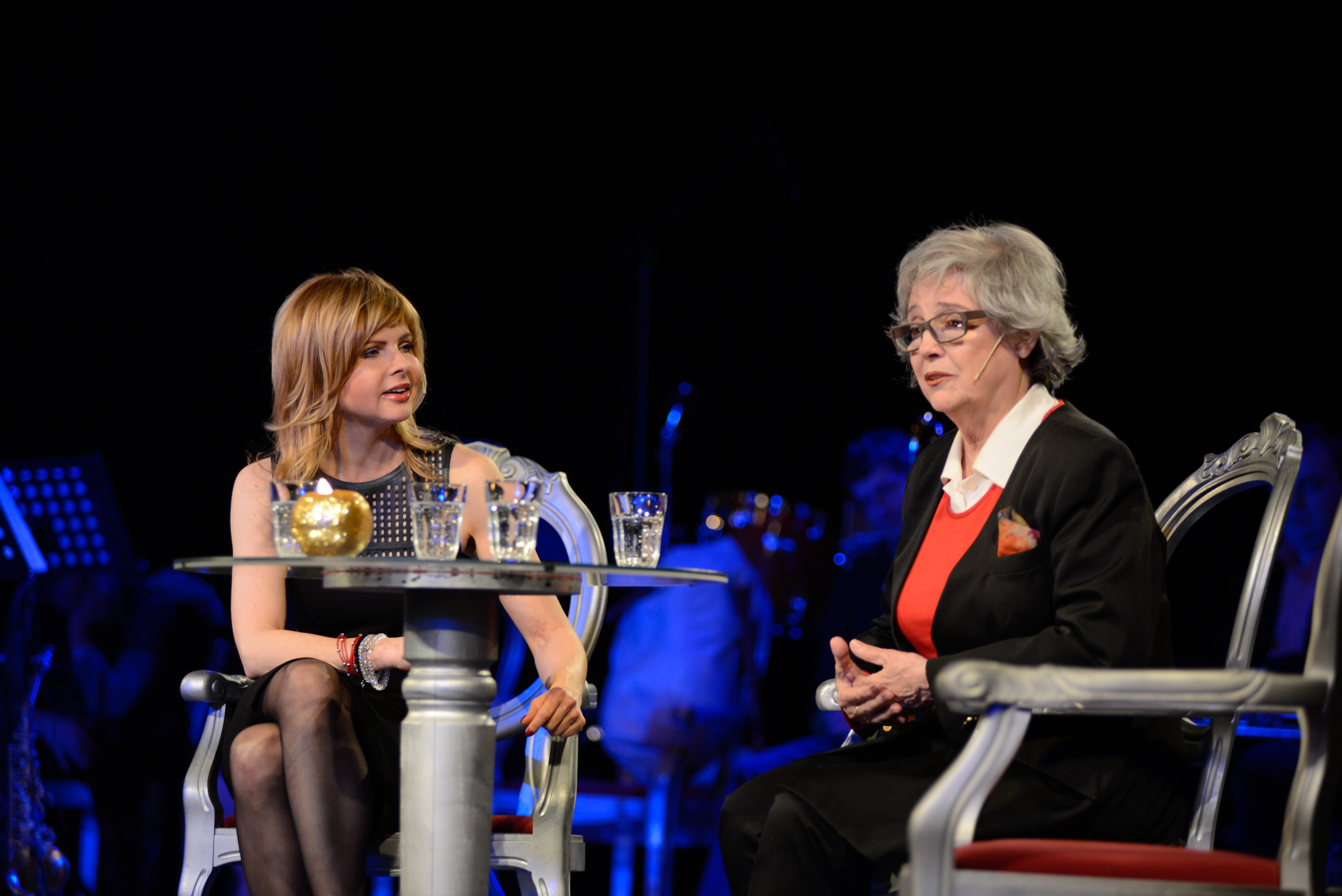
"I don't want to mentor here but even word has a sound content energy, that's all about energies. And when a performance turns out well, if there's my energy, an energy of fellows, an energy of the director who put his effort into it, then there's one great synergy which circulates, and after it circulates backwards. And that's the atmosphere in theater, that's what makes audiences laugh, moves them to tears or completely hushes them up, so they will hold their breath. And those are the moments that I love, and which I will never accomplish on any TV, in any series and in any film – only on stage."

— Actress on her relation with live audience
(Mestské divadlo Žilina; March 16, 2013).
Photo: Eduard Kudláč

The actress made her official debut on the screen in black-and-white movie entitled Most na tú stranu (English: A Bridge to the Other Side) by Vladislav Pavlovič, to be premiered in January the following year. The psychological drama starred Jozef Adamovič; a three years older actor whom Turzonovová would marry. Her initial appearance for television came along with Ján Klimo's Mladé letá (English: Young Ages, 1962), another drama based on an autobiographical novel by Martin Kukučín. While on college, she was cast in two plays at a chamber theatre of the Slovak National Theater, called Malá scéna (English: Small Stage). Following her graduating in September 1963, the actress signed a contract with the professional ensemble while being pregnant. As a result, she was accused of cheating as revealed. After return from parental leave, Turzonovová was cast in the follow-up project by Pavlovič Senzi Mama (English: Smashing Mom, 1964), while for TV productions taking part in comedies (Charlieho teta, Dobrodružstvo pri obžinkoch, Rozmajrín). In 1969, she would join the crew of Volpone, the only directorial attempt of František Dibarbora.

== Filmography ==
The filmography of Turzonovová chronicles her work through the artist's 50 years as a film, television and stage actress. She entered film industry in 1961, and made her official cinematic debut in Vladislav Pavlovič's production of Most na tú stranu. Overall, she appeared in one-hundred-sixty-five films to date, of which thirty-four are feature, and one-hundred-thirty-one television films or series. While on stage, Turzonovová was cast in one-hundred plays or musicals, eight of which have been also televised.

Year	Title	Role	Awards and nominations
1961	Most na tú stranu	Eva	Film debut
1971	Hájnikova žena^{†}	Hanka (title role)	Golden Croc^{[A]} for Best Female Performance in a TV Movie
1977	Penelopa	Eva Kamenická	Film a Divadlo Award^{[B]} for Best Actress
1977	Bludička	Katarína (title role)	Film a Divadlo Award^{[B]} for Most Popular Actress
1979	Božská Ema	Emmy Destinn (title role)	Submitted—Academy Award for Best Foreign Language Film
1980	Odveta	Kučerová	Film a Divadlo Award^{[B]} for Best Actress
1983	Anděl s ďáblem v těle	Mme Gábi Stolařová	Banská Bystrica Film Festival Award for Best Actress
1997	Orbis Pictus	Marta	Nominated—Czech Lion for Best Supporting Actress; Submitted—Academy Award for Best Foreign Language Film
2009	The Lunch Box^{‡} (aka Obedár)	Ružena Stoláriková	ShortFest Award for Best Live Action over 15 Minutes; Student Academy Award for Narrative Film (Bronze medal)
2013	Kovář z Podlesí	Shopkeeper	Last feature film to date
"†" denotes a TV film / "‡" denotes a short film.

Notes

- A The original show ran until 1989. (Simultaneously, a similar pool called Television Bells ran in the Czechoslovakia since 1985. In 1990, the Golden Croc was replaced by I Like; for the only year, eventually. Starting 1991 TýTý Awards is effective in the Czech Republic, while OTO Awards was founded in Slovakia in 2000).
- B The winners of the 77' edition were awarded in 1979.

== Awards ==
- Totals
Awards won	24
Nominations	28

Božidara Turzonovová has received a number of awards and accolades in recognition of her success in the film industry. As of March 2017, she has accumulated a total of 24 awards out of 28 nominations.

== See also ==
- List of Czechoslovak submissions for the Academy Award for Best Foreign Language Film (Božská Ema)
- List of Slovak submissions for the Academy Award for Best Foreign Language Film (Orbis Pictus)
- 35th Berlin International Film Festival (Noc smaragdového měsíce)
- Ljubljana International Film Festival (Vratné lahve)

== Bibliography ==
- Fuchs, Aleš (2000). Intimacies of Božidara Turzonovová (in Czech) (1st ed.). Prague, Czech Republic: Faun. p. 147. ISBN 978-80-86275-08-6.
- Kičiňová, Miriam; Kapráliková, Silvia; Karkalíková, Ingrid; Črep, Martin (2012). Blahová, Elena; Barysz, Zuzana; Brezňanová, Dana (eds.). Božidara Turzonovová - Profile (PDF) (in Slovak) (1st ed.). Bratislava, Slovak Republic: Slovak National Theater. p. 10. Archived from the original (PDF) on 2014-02-21.
