= International Film Festival Cinematik =

- Location: Piešťany, Slovakia
- Founded: 13 September 2006; 20 years ago
- Awards: Meeting Point Europe; Cinematik.doc
- Language: International
- Website: http://www.cinematik.sk

Current: 21st
- 22nd 20th

International Film Festival Cinematik (IFFC) is an international film festival in Piešťany, Slovakia, annually held during second week of September. The 21th edition was held from 8 to 13 September 2026. Festival is focusing primarily on European and Slovak cinematography.

The organizers of the festival are Cinematik, s.r.o. and Festival Cinematik, o.z., backed by the City of Piešťany. The festival takes place at seven locations: the House of Arts, Fontana cinema, Cinema club, the music pavilion, Kursalon, on Spa island by Bažant cinema and bar Žiwell.

== Festival board ==
The honorary director of the festival since its establishment is Slovak actress Božidara Turzonovová. The executive director is Tomáš Klenovský and Slovak director Vladimír Štric is the artistic director.

The main award of the festival is given for the winner in main competitive section – Meeting Point Europe Award (MPE). The award goes to the best European movie made since the previous year of Cinematik and is held under the auspices of the International Federation of Film Critics FIPRESCI.

== Festival editions ==
- 1st IFF Cinematik 2006; MPE Award: Caché (France) (Austria) (Germany) (Italy) (director: Michael Haneke)
- 2nd IFF Cinematik 2007; MPE Award: Taxidermia (Hungary) (Austria) (France) (director: György Pálfi)
- 3rd IFF Cinematik 2008; MPE Award: 4 Months, 3 Weeks and 2 Days (Romania) (director: Cristian Mungiu)
- 4th IFF Cinematik 2009; MPE Award: The Class (France) (director: Laurent Cantet)
- 5th IFF Cinematik 2010; MPE Award: The White Ribbon (Germany) (director: Michael Haneke)
- 6th IFF Cinematik 2011; MPE Award: Another Year (United Kingdom) (director: Mike Leigh)
- 7th IFF Cinematik 2012; MPE Award: The Artist (France) (Belgium) (director: Michel Hazanavicius)
- 8th IFF Cinematik 2013; MPE Award: The Hunt (Denmark) (director: Thomas Vinterberg)
- 9th IFF Cinematik 2014; MPE Award: The Great Beauty (Italy) (France) (director: Paolo Sorrentino)
- 10th IFF Cinematik 2015; MPE Award: The Duke of Burgundy (United Kingdom) (director: Peter Strickland)
- 11th IFF Cinematik 2016; MPE Award: Son of Saul (Hungary) (director: László Nemes)
- 12th IFF Cinematik 2017; MPE Award: Raw (France) (Belgium) (director: Julia Ducournau)
- 13th IFF Cinematik 2018; MPE Award: Cold War (Poland) (France) (United Kingdom) (director: Pawel Pawlikowski)
- 14th IFF Cinematik 2019; MPE Award: The Favourite (Republic of Ireland) (United Kingdom) (United States) (director: Yorgos Lanthimos)
- 15th IFF Cinematik 2020; MPE Award: Beanpole (Russia) (director: Kantemir Balagov)
- 16th IFF Cinematik 2021; MPE Award: Dear Comrades! (Russia) (director: Andrei Konchalovsky)
- 17th IFF Cinematik 2022; MPE Award: Triangle of Sadness (Sweden) (Germany) (France) (United Kingdom) (director: Ruben Östlund)
- 18th IFF Cinematik 2023; MPE Award: Fallen Leaves (Finland) (Germany) (director: Aki Kaurismäki)
- 19th IFF Cinematik 2024; MPE Award: The Substance (France) (United Kingdom) (United States) (director: Coralie Fargeat)
- 20th IFF Cinematik 2025; MPE Award: Sound of Falling (Germany) (director: Mascha Schilinski)
- 21st IFF Cinematik 2026; MPE Award: Fatherland (Poland) (Germany) (Italy) (France) (director: Paweł Pawlikowski)
