= Orbis Pictus (film) =

- Film poster
- Directed by: Martin Šulík
- Screenplay by: Martin Šulík; Marek Leščák; Ondrej Šulaj
- Produced by: Rudolf Biermann
- Starring: Dorota Nvotová; Marián Labuda; Božidara Turzonovová; Július Satinský; Emília Vášáryová; František Kovár
- Cinematography: Martin Štrba
- Edited by: Dušan Milko
- Music by: Vladimír Godár
- Release date: 16 May 1997 (Slovakia)
- Running time: 109 minutes
- Country: Slovakia
- Language: Slovak

Orbis Pictus is a 1997 Slovak film, starring Dorota Nvotová, Marián Labuda, Božidara Turzonovová, Július Satinský, Emília Vášáryová and František Kovár. The film, directed by Martin Šulík, won Special Award of the Jury at the International Filmfestival Mannheim-Heidelberg in Baden-Württemberg, Germany as the Best Film in 1997. The film was selected as the Slovak entry for the Best Foreign Language Film at the 70th Academy Awards, but was not accepted as a nominee.

== Plot ==
After being kicked out of boarding school sixteen-year-old Terezka goes on a fantasy-filled surrealistic journey to find her estranged mother. Along her way to Bratislava, she comes in contact with a mystical and strange cast of characters.

== Cast ==
- Dorota Nvotová as Terezka
- Marián Zednikovič as chauffeur
- Július Satinský as Drusa
- Hana Gregorová as bride
- Anton Šulík as father
- Marián Labuda as Emil
- Božidara Turzonovová as Marta
- Emília Vášáryová as mother
- František Kovár as Tomáš
- Mojmír Caban as railroader
- Ľubica Krkošková as railroader's wife
- Donato Moriconi as Momo
- Jakub Ursíny as groom
- Oľga Vronská as old woman
- Róbert Zimermann as Imriško
- Iveta Malachovská

=== Additional credits ===
- František Lipták - art director
- Milan Čorba - costume designer
- Ivan Seifert - sound
- Anita Hroššová - makeup artist
- Erik Panák - assistant director
- Dalibor Michalčík - assistant camera
- Viktor Fančovič - camera operator
- Jana Liptáková - script editor
- Ján Kittler - assistant sound
- Marek Štryncl - conductor
- Miroslav Hřebejk - sound mix

== Awards ==
| Year | Nomination | Award(s) | Category | Result |
|---|---|---|---|---|
| 1997 | Orbis Pictus | KFN SSN - Critics Award | Best Film | Won |
| 1997 | Božidara Turzonovová | Czech Lions | Best Supporting Actress | Nominated^{[A]} |
| 1997 | Martin Štrba | IGRIC Award | Best Camera | Won |
| 1997 | Martin Šulík | IGRIC Award | Best Director | Won |
| 1998 | Martin Šulík | IFF Mannheim-Heidelberg | Special Award of the Jury | Won |
| 1998 | Orbis Pictus | Alpe Adria Cinema | Peace Award | Won |

Notes

- A Won Klára Issová for her role of Veronika in Nejasná správa o konci sveta by Juraj Jakubisko. The second nominee included Vilma Cibulková (for her role of in Výchova dívek v Čechách by Petr Koliha).

== See also ==
- List of submissions to the 70th Academy Awards for Best Foreign Language Film
- List of Slovak submissions for the Academy Award for Best Foreign Language Film
