= Penelope (1978 film) =

- Theatrical release poster
- Original title: Penelopa
- Directed by: Štefan Uher
- Screenplay by: Alfonz Bednár
- Based on: Za hrsť drobných (series of novels)
- Produced by: Ján Svikruha
- Starring: Božidara Turzonovová; Eva Kristínová; Gustáv Valach; Michal Dočolomanský
- Cinematography: Stanislav Szomolányi
- Edited by: Maximilián Remeň
- Music by: Svetozár Stračina
- Distributed by: Slovenská požičovňa filmov Bratislava
- Release date: January 20, 1978
- Running time: 88 minutes
- Country: Czechoslovakia
- Language: Slovak

Penelope (Slovak: Penelopa) is a Slovak psychological drama film directed by Štefan Uher. Starring Božidara Turzonovová and Eva Kristínová, the movie was released on January 20, 1978.

Similarly as with some of previous works directed by Uher, such as Slnko v sieti (1962), he reunited with screenwriter Alfonz Bednár and cinematographer Stanislav Szomolányi.

== Plot ==
Restorer Eva Kamenická (Božidara Turzonovová) arrives to the village to repair frescoes of the heroines of ancient myths for the local castle. In daily life of the village inhabitants Eva soon finds some elements of ancient tragedy, especially in fate of a lonely old lady named Malovcová (Eva Kristínová). The woman, commonly referred to by locals as "Waitress of Change", awaits the return of her husband and son, who had gone to work in America twenty years ago. Eva sees in her a picture of the devoted and patient "Penelope", whose courage and faith impress young restorer. Experience gained while staying in the country turns into her own life decision. Not long after she becomes close with the Secretary of the Municipal Committee, Viktor (Michal Dočolomanský), she decides to leave her daughter Mima (Jana Čeligová) with selfish husband and start a new life.

== Cast ==
- Božidara Turzonovová - Eva Kamenická, restorer
- Eva Kristínová - Mrs. Malovcová, "Waitress of Change"/"Penelopa"
- Gustáv Valach - Kuzma, Sr.
- Michal Dočolomanský - Viktor Kuzma, Secretary of the Municipal Committee
- Ilja Prachař - Mišo Bajzlík
- Dušan Blaškovič - Vertel
- Milan Kiš - Gracík
- Anton Šulík - Lovčan
- Leopold Haverl - Stanko
- Jaroslav Vrzala - Nemlaha
- Igor Čillík - Ondro
- Jiřina Jelenská - Zora/Zuza
- Jana Nagyová - Verona
- Michal Nesvadba - Fero

Uncredited

- Igor Hrabinský - Miro
- Jana Čeligová - Mima, Eva's daughter
- Elena Volková - Mrs. Kuzmová
- Štefan Mišovic - Blažej
- Ján Géc - publican
- Jozef Mifkovič - publican
- Emília Halamová - Amerikán's wife
- Vladimír Macko - police officer
- Ľubomír Zaťovič - Molčan
- František Desset - Berto Bajzík
- Lenka Kořínková - girl
- Štefan Turňa
- Jaroslav Černík
- Ľudovít Greššo - Mišo Bajzík (voice)
- Hana Kostolanská - Kuzmová (voice)
- Dušan Kaprálik - Fero (voice)
- Katarína Orbánová - Zuza (voice)

== Awards ==
Year	Nominated work	Award	Category	Result
1978	Štefan Uher	Czechoslovak Film Festival České Budějovice	Direction - Special Mention	Won
1979	Božidara Turzonovová	Film a Divadlo Awards	Best Actress	Won
1979	Michal Dočolomanský	Film a Divadlo Awards	Best Actor	Won

== See also ==
- The Sun in a Net (1962s work by the same tandem Uher-Bednár-Szomolányi)
