= Friedrich Hopp =

Austrian stage actor and writer

Friedrich Ernst Hopp (23 August 1789 – 23 June 1869) was an Austrian actor and writer.

== Life ==
Born in Brünn, Hopp was the son of a factory worker. At first he started a commercial career, worked as a traveling salesman and accountant and was active as a layman actor. From 1815 he was engaged at various theaters in Brünn, Graz, Bratislava and Baden bei Wien until he got a position at the Vienna Theater in der Josefstadt in 1822. From 1825 he worked parallel to this at the Theater an der Wien. In Vienna he experienced the height of his acting career and became a darling of the public. In 1833 he played the journeyman carpenter Leim in the world premiere of Johann Nestroy's Posse mit Gesang Der böse Geist Lumpazivagabundus.

Standing in Nestroy's shadow and becoming more and more unsuccessful, Hopp left the Theater in der Josefstadt in 1846 and played at provincial theaters. From 1847 to 1849 he worked at the Carltheater, which he left after a dispute with the director Carl Carl. Only after the death of the latter did he return to Vienna, where he ended his acting career due to illness in 1862 at the Theater am Franz-Josefs-Kai.

Hopp also wrote some farces himself. His first play was written in 1829. He was regarded as a folk poet, who was oriented to the taste of the common people, and as a rival of Karl Haffner and Friedrich Kaiser. His most important works are the plays premiered in 1840 Doktor Fausts Hauskäppchen and Der Pelzpalatin und der Kachelofen. Nestroy played the leading role in Hopp's adaptation of the Der dreißigjährige ABC-Schütz which no longer exists today.

Hopp died in Vienna at age 79. His son Julius was a composer and Kapellmeister at the Theater an der Wien.

== Work ==
- Das schwarze Kind. Singspiel. 1829.
- Der Goldkönig, der Vogelhändler und der Pudelscheerer oder: die Eisenpforte im grauen Thale. Ein romantisch-komisches Zauberspiel in zwei Aufzügen. München 1835. – Volltext online.
- Die Bekanntschaft im Paradiesgarten, die Entführung vom grünen Baum, und die Verlobung in Untersendling. Eine Lokal-Posse mit Gesang in drei Akten. München 1837. – Volltext online.
- Die Bekanntschaft im Paradiesgarten, die Entführung auf dem Himmel, und die Verlobung im Elisium. Local-Posse mit Gesang in drei Aufzügen. Wien 1839. – Volltext online.
- Hutmacher und Strumpfwirker, oder: Die Ahnfrau im Gemeindestadel. Posse mit Gesang in zwei Aufzügen. Auf dem k. k. privil. Theater an der Wien zum ersten Mahle aufgeführt am 7. März 1837. Wien 1839. – Volltext online.
- Das Gut Waldegg, die Husaren und der Kinderstrumpf. Posse mit Gesang in drei Aufzügen, zum ersten Male aufgeführt im k. k. priv. Theater an der Wien, am 16. Mai 1838. Wien 1841. – Volltext online.
- Doctor Faust's Hauskäppchen, oder: Die Herberge im Walde. Posse mit Gesang in drei Aufzügen. Wien 1843. – Volltext online.
- Atlasshawl und Harrasbinde, oder: Das Haus der Confusionen. Posse mit Gesang in zwei Aufzügen. Wien 1849. – Volltext online.
- Lazarus Polkwitzer von Nikolsburg, oder: Die Landparthie nach Baden. Posse mit Gesang in zwei Aufzügen. Wien 1849. – Volltext online.
- Elias Regenwurm oder: Die Verlobung auf der Parforçe-Jagd. Posse mit Gesang in zwei Acten. Wien 1853. – Volltext online.
- Der Pelzpalatin und der Kachelofen, oder: Der Jahrmarkt zu Rautenbrunn. Posse mit Gesang in drei Aufzügen. Wien 1853. – Volltext online.
- Der Herr Bürgermeister und seine Familie. Charakterbild mit Gesang in drei Akten, im Theater am Franz-Josefs-Quai mit großem Beifall gegeben. Wien 1861. – Volltext online.
- Der Billeteur und sein Kind. Lustspiel mit Gesang in drei Akten, am 13. Dezember 1862 zum ersten Mal im k. k. priv. Theater an der Wien mit glängendem (sic!) Erfolg gegeben. Wien 1862. – Volltext online.
- Die fesche Godl. Skizzen aus dem Wiener Volksleben mit Gesang in drei Abtheilungen und sechs Bildern. Wien 1866. – Volltext online.
