= Einen Jux will er sich machen =

Musical play written by Johann Nestroy

- Posse mit Gesang by Adolf Müller
- Translation: He Will Go on a Spree or He'll Have Himself a Good Time
- Librettist: Johann Nestroy
- Language: German
- Based on: A Day Well Spent by John Oxenford
- Premiere: 10 March 1842; Theater an der Wien

Einen Jux will er sich machen (1842) (He Will Go on a Spree or He'll Have Himself a Good Time) is a three-act musical play, designated as a Posse mit Gesang ("farce with singing"), by Austrian playwright Johann Nestroy. It was adapted from John Oxenford's A Day Well Spent (1835), and was first performed at the Theater an der Wien in Vienna on 10 March 1842. The music was composed by Adolf Müller.

Although about half of Nestroy's works have been revived for the modern German-speaking audience and many are part and parcel of today's Viennese repertoire, few have ever been translated into English because Nestroy wrote in a stylized and finely graduated form of Viennese dialect full of multiple puns and local allusions.

Einen Jux will er sich machen is his only work that has become well known to English-speaking theatre-goers. A frequently adapted classic, it was adapted twice by Thornton Wilder, first as The Merchant of Yonkers (1938), then, much more successfully, as The Matchmaker (1955), which later became the musical Hello, Dolly!. It also achieved success as the play On the Razzle, which was adapted by Tom Stoppard in 1981. Stoppard says in his introduction that in most of the dialogues, he did not even attempt to translate what Nestroy wrote.

== Roles ==
- Zangler, spice trader in a small town
- Marie, his niece and ward
- Weinberl, Zangler's apprentice
- Christopherl, Zangler's apprentice
- Kraps, Zangler's servant
- Frau Gertrud, Zangler's housekeeper
- Melchior, a lazy servant
- August Sonders, Marie's impoverished suitor
- Hupfer, a master tailor
- Madame Knorr, milliner in Vienna
- Frau von Fischer, widow
- Fräulein Blumenblatt, Zangler's sister-in-law
- Brunninger, merchant
- Philippine, milliner
- Lisett, Fräulein Blumenblatt's parlour maid
- A landlord
- A coachman
- A guard
- Rab, a crook
- First waiter
- Second waiter

== Synopsis ==
Weinberl and Christopherl go off to Vienna when they should be looking after Zangler's shop, only to run straight into their boss. (See the plot of On the Razzle for more details.)

== Films ==
The 1935 German film Lessons in Love directed by Carl Hoffmann was based on the play. A film entitled Einen Jux will er sich machen was made for television in 1956, directed by Alfred Stöger, with Josef Meinrad as Weinberl, Inge Konradi as Christopherl, Hans Thimig as Kraps, Richard Eybner as Zangerl, Ferdinand Mayerhofer as Melchior, and Gusti Wolf as Marie.
