= John Oxenford =

English dramatist, critic and translator (1812–1877)

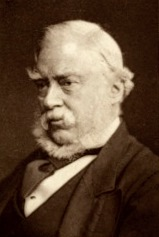
John Oxenford

John Oxenford (12 August 1812 – 21 February 1877) was an English dramatist, critic and translator.

== Life ==
Oxenford was born in Camberwell, London, his father a prosperous merchant. While he was privately educated, it is reported that he was mostly self-taught in Greek, Latin and modern languages. He began his literary career by writing on finance, though later became the author of many translations from German, notably of Goethe's Dichtung und Wahrheit (1846) and Eckermann's Conversations with Goethe (1850).

Oxenford's primary interest was in the theatre and over sixty-eight plays are attributed to him. His first play was My Fellow Clerk, produced at the Lyceum Theatre in 1835. This was followed by a long series of pieces, the most famous of which was perhaps the Porter's Knot (1858) and Twice Killed (1835). He also wrote many operatic libretti, including eight for George Alexander Macfarren, including Robin Hood (1860) and Helvellyn (1864). Oxenford was an acquaintance of Charles Dickens, and he adapted Oliver Twist for the stage in 1868. Later in life he became dramatic critic of The Times and wrote a version of Last Days of Pompeii in 1872.

Bryan Magee, in his The Philosophy of Schopenhauer, described how Oxenford contributed to the promulgation of Schopenhauer's work. Oxenford's anonymous Westminster Review 1853 article, "Iconoclasm in German Philosophy", was written in order to present Schopenhauer as a critic of Hegel. It was translated and published in the Vossische Zeitung, which resulted in German readers showing enthusiastic and enduring interest in Schopenhauer's writings. It also advanced the cause of Richard Wagner in Britain.

He died in Southwark on 21 February 1877.

== Legacy ==
John Oxenford 1835 one-act farce A Day Well Spent was extended into the full-length play Einen Jux will er sich machen (He'll Have Himself a Good Time) by Austrian playwright Johann Nestroy in 1842. In 1938, Thornton Wilder adapted Nestroy's version into the Americanized comedy The Merchant of Yonkers. Fifteen years later, director Tyrone Guthrie expressed interest in a new production of the play, which Wilder extensively rewrote and rechristened The Matchmaker. This version was the basis of the 1964 stage musical Hello, Dolly!. A Day Well Spent was also the basis for the 1891 musical A Trip to Chinatown by Charles H. Hoyt and Percy Gaunt.

Many references to his pieces will be found in The Life and Reminiscences of E. L. Blanchard (ed. C Scott and C Howard, 1891).
