= Dolly Gallagher Levi =

- The Merchant of Yonkers character
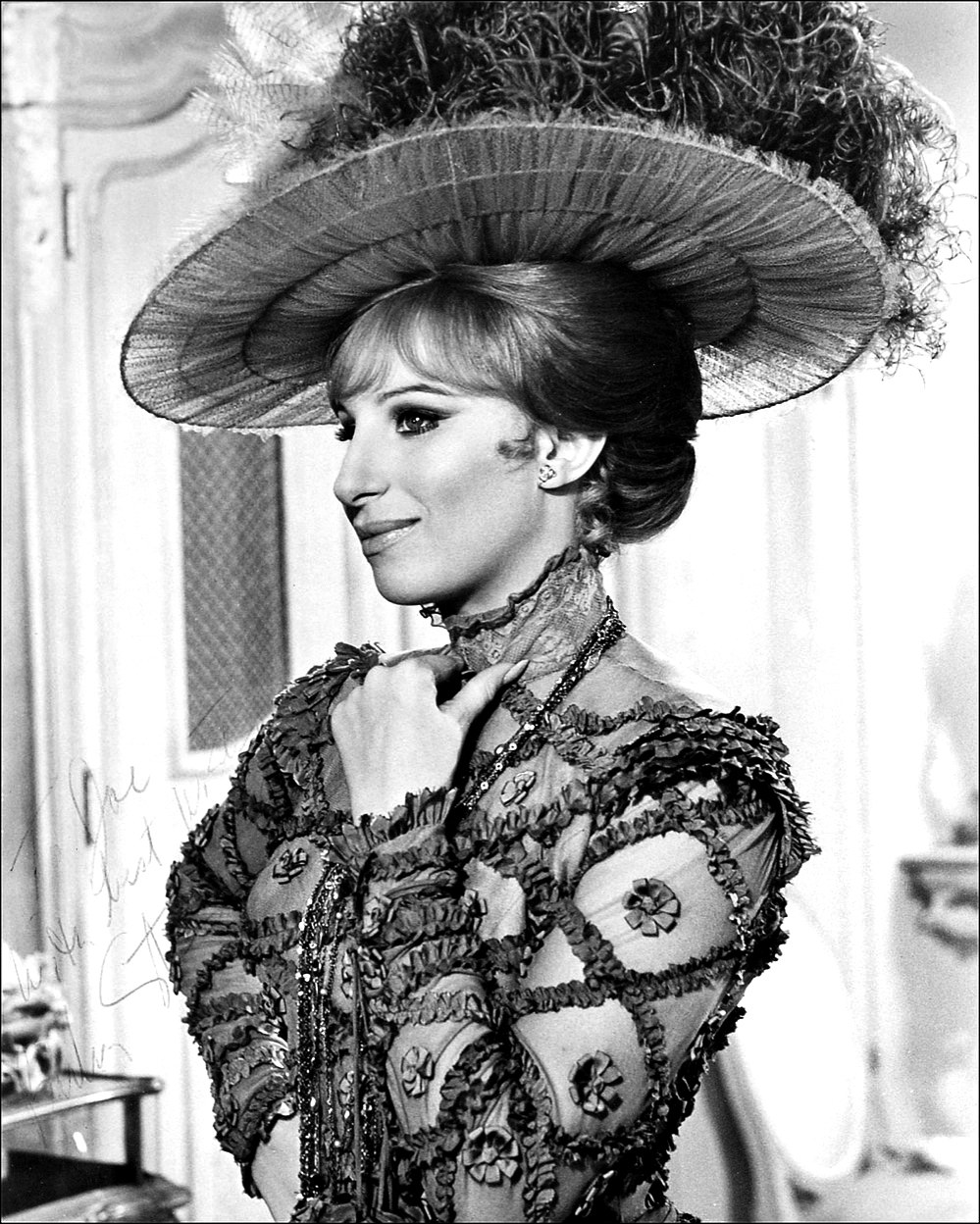
- Barbra Streisand as Dolly Levi in the 1969 musical film Hello, Dolly!
- First appearance: The Merchant of Yonkers
- Created by: Thornton Wilder
- Portrayed by: See below

In-universe information
- Gender: Female
- Occupation: Matchmaker; Businesswoman; Dance instructor; Wedding planner; Mandolin teacher; French teacher; Cheese importer; Roof inspector; Bills collector; Beautician; Chef; Upholsterer; Social listener; Lobbyist; Investor
- Spouse: Ephram Levi (dec.); Horace Vandergelder
- Religion: Catholic
- Home: Yonkers, New York
- Nationality: American

Dolly Gallagher Levi is a fictional character and the protagonist of the 1938 play The Merchant of Yonkers and its multiple adaptations, the most notable being the 1964 musical Hello, Dolly! Levi's main profession is matchmaking in Yonkers, New York. She also begins a romantic involvement with businessman Horace Vandergelder, when she sends his niece on a date with a local town boy.

== Character description ==
=== Plays ===
Dolly Levi is a "widow in her middle years who has decided to begin her life again. She is a matchmaker, meddler, opportunist, and a life-loving woman." She is from Yonkers, New York and was married to Ephram Levi, who dies before the events of the story. She is loud, brassy, and constantly meddling in others' lives. These qualities make her beloved by her hometown. During one of her matchmaking jobs, she meets half-a-millionaire, Horace Vandergelder, who owns a store in downtown Yonkers. During the story, she attempts to make him fall in love with her, though her attempts are mostly unsuccessful. She also constantly quotes her late husband's favorite saying:

Money is like manure. It's no good unless you spread it around.

=== Stage musical ===
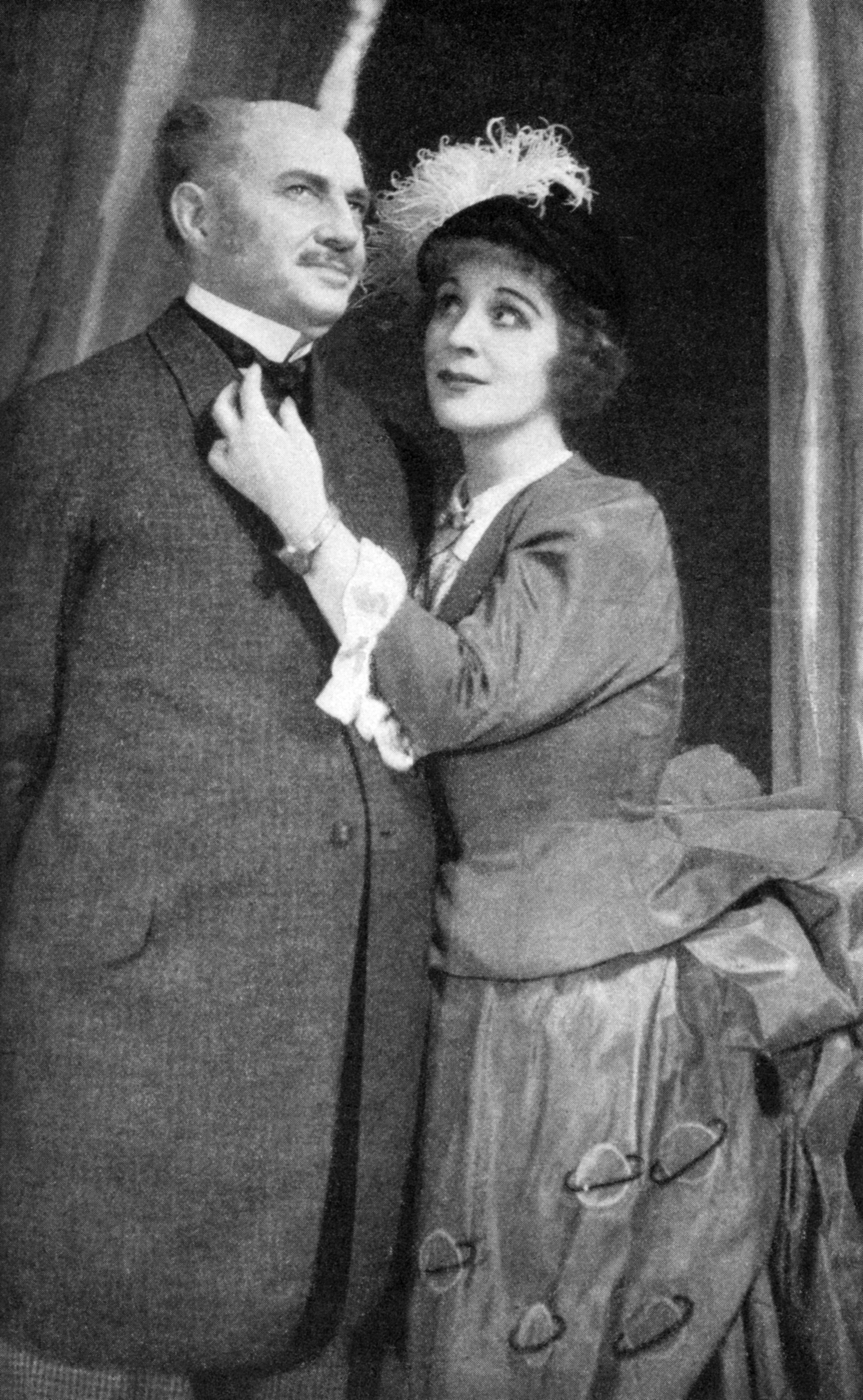
Percy Waram and Jane Cowl as Horace and Dolly, respectively, in the Broadway production of The Merchant of Yonkers (1938)

During the first act of the musical, Dolly is still quite attached to her late husband, Ephram. However, during the act finale, "Before the Parade Passes By," she decides to move on with her life and chase after Horace Vandergelder's affections. In the titular song, Dolly claims to the waiters of the Harmonia Gardens restaurant that she will never leave New York again.

=== Musical film adaptation ===
While many portrayals of Levi in the musical are comedic and loving, Barbra Streisand's concept of the character is more harsh to those around her, especially Horace (who is played by Walter Matthau). This feeling can be seen especially in the penultimate song, "So Long Dearie."

== Notable portrayals ==
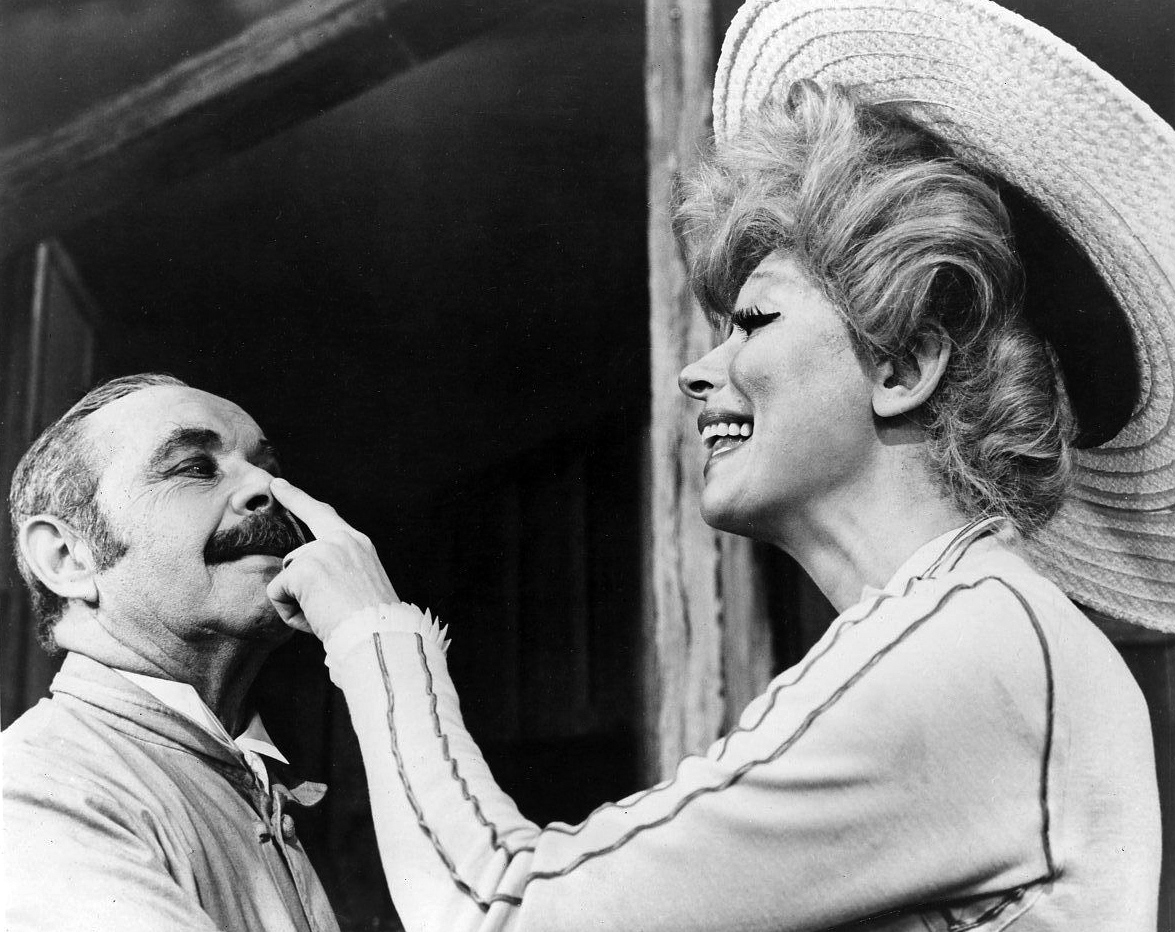
David Burns and Carol Channing as Horace and Dolly, respectively, in the original Broadway cast of Hello Dolly!, 1964

- Jane Cowl in the original Broadway cast of The Merchant of Yonkers
- Ruth Gordon in the original Broadway cast of The Matchmaker
- Shirley Booth in the 1958 film adaptation of the same name

=== Hello Dolly! ===
- Carol Channing in the original, third, and fourth Broadway casts, first West End revival, and second national touring cast
- Thelma Carpenter, Phyllis Diller, Betty Grable, Ethel Merman, Bibi Osterwald, Martha Raye and Ginger Rogers as replacements in the original Broadway cast
- Mary Martin in the original West End and first international touring cast
- Barbra Streisand in the 1969 film of the same name
- Pearl Bailey in the first Broadway revival (Note: Bailey was the first African-American actress to play the role) and as a replacement in the original Broadway cast
- Danny La Rue in the second West End revival (Note: La Rue was the first male actor to play the character in drag)
- Samantha Spiro in the third West End revival
- Sally Struthers in the 50th anniversary tour
- Bette Midler in the fourth Broadway revival
- Bernadette Peters and Donna Murphy (Note: Murphy only played Dolly at certain performances) as replacements in the fourth Broadway revival
- Betty Buckley in the first national touring cast
- Carolee Carmello as a replacement for the first national touring cast
- Imelda Staunton in the fourth West End revival

== Additions ==
Clips from the 1969 musical film were featured in the 2008 animated film WALL-E.
