= On the razzle =

"On the razzle" is a euphemism describing the actions of someone who has drunk, or is about to drink, a considerable amount of alcohol. It is often used by the British press to refer to the actions of a celebrity. A night "on the razzle" does not carry completely negative connotations; it is often only used to describe someone as having enjoyed themselves.

There are several theories as to the origin of the phrase.

- The OED suggests that "on the razzle" is a shortening of "on the razzle-dazzle", which is found at least as early as the 1890s: "I live ever so quietly; I don't drink; I don't bet much; and I never go regularly on the razzle-dazzle as you did when you were my age."
- Another suggestion is that it came about during World War I, when ships were often painted in bright zigzag patterns to confuse German U-boats. Sailors often came back on the supply ships from North America after consuming a large quantity of alcohol, and were said to have been "on the razzle". This derivation seems unlikely given the much earlier (1890s) use of the phrase "on the razzle-dazzle".
- Another theory is that there was a gin parlour notorious for the extreme merriment of its customers in London during the 1750s. Its proprietor, who called himself "Dash Razzall," was an unscrupulous man of Italian descent. It is unclear as to how his name mutated into razzle, but his gin parlour was renowned for the amount of alcohol consumed, and that after he went bankrupt his family moved to Sussex, where they became renowned as being prone to overindulge.

Playwright Tom Stoppard used this phrase as the title of a 1981 farce, On the Razzle, which he adapted from an earlier play by Johann Nestroy.
