= Julius Hopp =

Julius Hopp (18 May 1819 – 28 August 1885) was an Austrian composer, conductor, arranger and translator.

== Life and career ==
Born in Graz, Empire of Austria, the son of the actor and poet Friedrich Hopp, Lucius became known in the 1860s and 1870s through his adaptations of Jacques Offenbach's operettas, which were mainly performed in the Theater an der Wien, where Hopp was Kapellmeister. He composed parodies, antics and folk plays and appeared as a translator of French operas and operettas. In particular Hopp's sparkling adaptations of the operettas of Jacques Offenbach (1819-1880) ensured the success of these works on Viennese soil and brought riches to theatre entrepreneurs whereby Hopp, due to his modesty, but not entirely through his own fault, did not enjoy that shower of gold.

Of Hopp's own works - despite their richness of melody - Das Donauweibchen and Morilla were only moderate successes. "Margaret and Mitten," on the other hand, had countless performances.

As the last of his theatre performances Hopp worked at the Theater in der Josefstadt until 1880. After he had become hard of hearing and unable to work at that time, the days of naked misery came for him. Hopp died at age 66 on 28 August 1885 in the Niederösterreichische Landesirrenanstalt am Brünnlfeld in Vienna Alsergrund; he was buried on 31 August 1885 at Wiener Zentralfriedhof. The costs of the corpse burial were covered by Leopold Friedrich von Hofmann (1822-1885), General Director of the two Viennese court theatres.

== Work ==
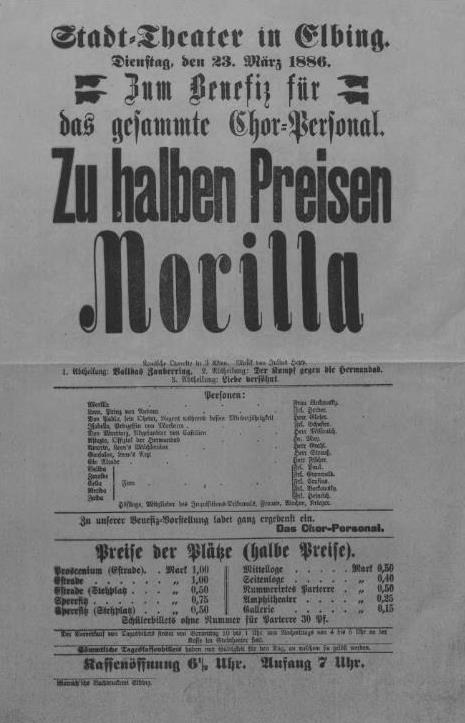
Premiere of the opera Morilla in Elbing, 1886

- Oesterreichs Flüsse (libretto: Carl Paul), allegorical festival, UA 1854
- Der Bräutigam in Hemdärmeln oder Vetter Fritz (libretto: Karl Julius), Posse mit Gesang, UA 1854
- Eine Vorstadt-G'schicht' (libretto: O. F. Berg), Life picture with singing and dancing, UA 1858
- Ein Wiener Kind (libretto: Therese Megerle), Folk play with singing, UA 1858
- Bruder und Brüderln (libretto: Karl Stein), Character portrait with singing and dancing, UA 1858
- Im Dorf (libretto: Therese Megerle), Rural character painting with song and dance, UA 1858
- Ein gebrochenes Wort (Das Erbtheil der Waise) (libretto: Therese Megerle), play with singing and dancing, UA 1859
- Zwei Mann von Heß (libretto: Anton Langer), Original life picture with singing, UA 1860
- Anna die schöne Kellnerin (libretto: H. Riedl), Character portrait with singing and dancing, UA 1860
- Fesche Geister von anno dazumal (Das Kind des Regiments) (libretto: O. F. Berg), popular work with singing, UA 1862
- Margrethl/Margarethl und Fäustling ... (own libretto), parodistic burlesque with music and dance, UA 1862
- Ein Deutschmeister (libretto: Karl Swiedack), operetta, UA 1863
- Auroras Geheimniß (libretto: Julius Megerle), Character painting with singing, dancing and ghostly apparitions, UA 1863
- Eine leichte Person (libretto: O. F. Berg), Posse, UA 1863
- Er nimmt auf seine Frau Geld auf (Libretto: Franz Biringer), Singspiel mit Tanz, UA 1864
- Herr Arthur Gareißl (libretto von A. Bahn), Posse mit Gesang, UA 1864
- Der halbe Mensch (libretto: O. F. Berg), Image of the people's life, UA 1864
- Der Postillion von Langenlois libretto: Julius Bittner), burlesque Posse mit Gesang, UA 1864
- Ein Wiener Findelkind (libretto: Therese Megerle), pictures from popular life mit Gesang, UA 1864
- Die fesche Godel (libretto: Ferdinand Heim), sketches from the folk life with singing, UA 1865
- Das Donauweibchen und der Ritter vom Kahlenberg (libretto: J. Hopp and Paul Krone), romantic-comic operetta, 1866
- Auf einem Vulkan (libretto: Alois Berla), Charakterbild mit Gesang, UA 1867
- Der Freischütz (own libretto), Posse mit Gesang und Tanz, UA 1867
- Morilla (own libretto), Operetta, UA 1868
- Gräfin Pepi oder: Zwei bekannte Persönlichkeiten (libretto after Gräfin Guste by David Kalisch), Posse in one act, UA 1871
- Hamlet (own libretto), comic-parodic operetta, UA 1874
