= On the Razzle (play) =

1981 play by Tom Stoppard

- Poster for the original Royal National Theatre production
- Original language: English
- Written by: Tom Stoppard
- Characters: Herr Zangler, owner of a rural upscale grocery store Mme. Knorr, proprietor of a women's clothing store in Vienna; Weinberl, Zangler's chief clerk Christopher, Zangler's apprentice Frau Fischer, Mme. Knorr's customer Marie, Zangler's niece Sonders, Marie's ne'er-do-well suitor Melchior, Zangler's personal assistant
- Subject: Mistaken identities lead to comedic chaos and romantic entanglements
- Genre: Farce
- Setting: Vienna

Premiere
- Date: 18 September 1981
- Place: Royal National Theatre; London

On the Razzle is a play by Tom Stoppard which premiered at the Royal National Theatre, London in 1981. It is an adaptation of the 1842 Viennese play Einen Jux will er sich machen by Johann Nestroy, which had been adapted twice by Thornton Wilder. The first Wilder version, 1938, entitled The Merchant of Yonkers, was faithful to the original material, but the second Wilder version, 1955, renamed The Matchmaker, expanded the previously secondary role of Dolly Gallagher Levi, who later became the heroine of the Jerry Herman musical hit, Hello, Dolly! Stoppard's adaptation eliminates the Dolly character.

The play's title is a euphemism, often used by the British press, to describe the actions of a celebrity who has drunk, or is about to drink, a considerable amount of alcohol.

== Plot ==
Stoppard's farce consists of two hours of slapstick shenanigans, mistaken identities, misdirected orders, malapropisms, double entendres, and romantic complications.

Herr Zangler, the twisted-tongued proprietor of an upscale grocery store in a small Austrian village, plans to marry Mme. Knorr, the proprietor of a women's clothing shop in Vienna. In preparation for his new life in the big city, he orders a new wardrobe and hires the fast-talking Melchior as a personal assistant. He arranges to send his niece Marie to his sister-in-law in Vienna, Miss Blumenblatt, to protect her from the penniless Sonders who is courting her. As he departs for Vienna, Zangler entrusts the operation of his business to his garrulous head clerk, Weinberl, and his naive apprentice, Christopher, but they decide to go "on the razzle" to Vienna.

Almost immediately, Weinberl and Christopher catch sight of Zangler and disguise themselves as mannequins in the window of Mme. Knorr's House of Fashion. Circumstances propel the two into a fancy restaurant in the company of Mme. Knorr and her customer, Frau Fischer who has been roped into pretending she is Weinberl's new wife, the same restaurant to which Zangler intends to take Mme. Knorr. Several sprinting waiters, a sexually obsessed coachman, and a carefully positioned Chinese screen come into play, and things finally seem to be settling down when the eloping Sonders and Marie enter the scene, and the chaos starts anew. The various characters flee to Miss Blumenblatt's, who mistakes Weinberl and the disguised Christopher as Sonders and Marie. Eventually, all is sorted out, Christopher and Weinberl make it back to the store in time to prevent Zangler from ever knowing they were gone. Everything solves itself: Sonders comes into an inheritance and is allowed to marry Marie, Weinberl and Frau Fischer discover they have been romantic pen pals all along, Christopher is promoted, Zangler and Mme. Knorr finalize their engagement, and life returns to normal after one night "on the razzle".

== Production history ==
On the Razzle opened on September 18, 1981 at the Royal National Theatre in London, with Felicity Kendal switching genders to star as Christopher.

Other cast members included Dinsdale Landen as Herr Zangler, Michael Kitchen as Melchior, Ciaran Madden as Mme. Knorr, Meg Wynne Owen as Frau Fischer, and Alfred Lynch as Weinberl. Peter Wood won the Laurence Olivier Award for Best Director.

The production later was filmed by Terence Donovan in association with Channel 4. The film was released in 1983 and once again starred Kendal as Christopher. It eventually aired on PBS' Great Performances in the United States in January 1986.

The American premiere featured Yeardley Smith and was directed by Douglas C. Wager. It opened at Arena Stage in Washington, D.C. in September 1982. An off-Broadway production was mounted at the Bouwerie Lane Theatre in Greenwich Village in 1999.

Scottish composer Robin Orr created an opera based on the play in 1988.

On the Razzle was performed as part of the Shaw Festival's 2023 summer lineup.
