= St Helena (play) =

Play by R. C. Sherriff

- Original language: English
- Written by: R.C. Sheriff
- Characters: Napoleon Bonaparte
- Subject: Napoleon
- Genre: Biographical
- Setting: Longwood House, St. Helena, 1815

Premiere
- Date: 4 February 1936
- Place: Old Vic London

St Helena: a play in twelve scenes is a play by the English author R. C. Sherriff (notable as the author of the First World War drama Journey's End) and Jeanne de Casalis (who also researched it). It deals with the exile of Napoleon I on Saint Helena. In a production by Henry Cass, it premiered at the Old Vic on 4 February 1936 to poor reviews, but was rescued by a letter to The Times by Winston Churchill, calling it "a remarkable play" and "a work of art of a very high order"; though a West End transfer also proved unsuccessful.

== Original cast ==
- General Count Bertrand - Ion Swinley
- General Count Montholon - Leo Genn
- General Baron Gourgaud - Clement McCallin
- Napoleon - Kenneth Kent
- Admiral Sir George Cockburn - Raymond Huntley
- Captain Nicholls - Robert Craven
- Count Las Cases - Alan Wheatley
- Sir Hudson Lowe - Cecil Trouncer
- Dr. O'Meara - William Devlin
- Dr. Antommarchi, Ship's Carpenter - Alec Clunes
- Marine - Eric Wynn-Owen
- St. Denis - Anthony Quayle
- Marchand - Richard Warner
- Cipriani - Alwyn Whatsley
- French Servants - Phillip Bowen
  Denis Carew
- English Sailors - John Franklyn
  John Jameson
- Novarrez - George Woodbridge
- Officer, Trooper - Guy Haslewood
- Subaltern - John Franklyn
- Napoleon Bertrand - Tony Wickham
- Tristan - Eric Sutton
- Abe Buonavita - Charles Doe
- Abbe Vignali - Christopher Casson
- Chinese Gardeners - Alan Foss
  John Kennedy
  John Jameson
- Countess Montholon - Vivienne Bennett
- Countess Bertrand - Ursula Granville
- Hortense Bertrand - Glynis Johns
- Mulatto Maid - Fredericka Allen

== United States premiere and Broadway production ==
St Helena was first staged in the United States at the National Theatre in Washington, D.C. on September 28, 1936 in a production produced by Max Gordon for the opening the National's 101st season. The production transferred to Broadway's Lyceum Theatre where it opened on October 6, 1936. Staged by Robert B. Sinclair, the production starred Maurice Evans as Napoleon, Reginald Mason as General Count Betrand, Joseph Macaulay as General Baron Gourgaud, Stephen Ker Appleby as General Count Montholon, Kay Strozzi as Countess Montholon, Rosamond Pinchot as Countess Bertrand, Percy Waram as Sir Hudson Lowe, Harry Bellaver as The Abbe Vignali, Edward Fielding as Admiral Sir George Cockburn, and Whitford Kane as Dr. O'Meara. It ran for 63 performances.

== Adaptation ==
St Helena was presented as the February 27, 1949, episode of The Philco Television Playhouse on NBC. The trade publication Variety described Dennis King's portrayal of Napoleon as "an admirable characterization".

== Sources ==
- R. C. Sherriff, No Leading Lady (London: Victor Gollancz Ltd, 1968), pages 297 to 308
- A New Play About Napoleon - The Times, Thursday, Jan 30, 1936; pg. 12;
