= The Big Hangover =

1950 film by Norman Krasna

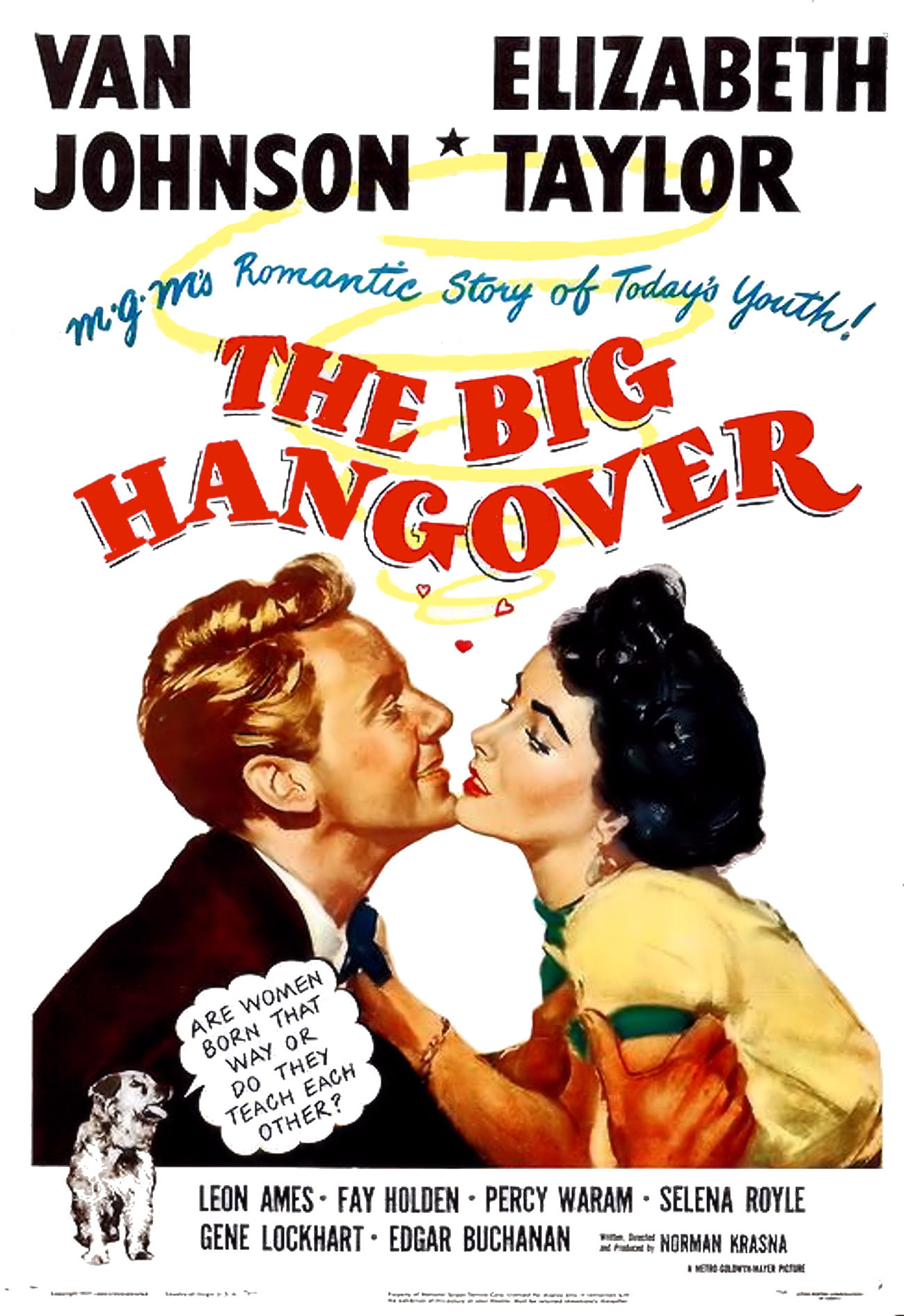
- Theatrical release poster
- Directed by: Norman Krasna
- Written by: Norman Krasna
- Produced by: Norman Krasna
- Starring: Van Johnson; Elizabeth Taylor; Leon Ames; Fay Holden; Percy Waram; Selena Royle; Gene Lockhart; Edgar Buchanan
- Cinematography: George J. Folsey
- Edited by: Fredrick Y. Smith
- Music by: Adolph Deutsch
- Production company: Metro-Goldwyn-Mayer
- Distributed by: Loew's Inc.
- Release date: May 26, 1950
- Running time: 82 minutes
- Country: United States
- Language: English
- Budget: $1,026,000
- Box office: $1,626,000

The Big Hangover is a 1950 American comedy film produced, written, and directed by Norman Krasna. It stars Van Johnson and Elizabeth Taylor, with Leon Ames, Fay Holden, Percy Waram, Selena Royle, Gene Lockhart, and Edgar Buchanan in supporting roles.

The Big Hangover was one of Taylor's first films to feature her in an "adult character" role, the first being the 1949 British thriller Conspirator.

Despite being released with high hopes, The Big Hangover was a critical and box-office disappointment. Home video releases are scarce in any format, as the film remains largely unknown.

== Plot ==
Law school student David Maldon is hired by a prominent law firm. At a birthday party for the senior partner, his erratic behavior causes Belney's beautiful daughter Mary to accuse David of being drunk, but he is not. David suffers from a rare malady called "liquor recoil" that causes him to become intoxicated at the mere taste of alcohol. He hallucinates during these episodes, even imagining a talking dog, and Mary, a psychoanalyst, is fascinated with the phenomenon.

City attorney Carl Bellcap is threatening a lawsuit against the firm over the eviction of a Chinese family from their apartment. David intervenes, saving the day, but firm partner Charles Parkford had been responsible for the eviction and is now livid. Parkford slips wine into David's soup and then enjoys watching David make a public spectacle of himself. David later rebukes Bellcap at the dinner and the others at the table are aghast, but Bellcap admits that he has been wrong and supports David.

At law-school graduation, David surprises his colleagues by submitting his resignation, deciding to work instead for Bellcap and the city for meager pay. Mary hates to see him leave the family firm but respects David's values, and she has fallen in love with him.

== Cast ==
- Van Johnson as David Maldon
- Elizabeth Taylor as Mary Belney
- Percy Waram as John Belney
- Fay Holden as Martha Belney
- Leon Ames as Carl Bellcap
- Edgar Buchanan as Uncle Fred Mahoney
- Selena Royle as Kate Mahoney
- Gene Lockhart as Charles Parkford
- Rosemary DeCamp as Claire Bellcap
- Philip Ahn as Dr. Lee
- Gordon Richards as Williams
- Matt Moore as Mr. Rumlie
- Pierre Watkin as Samuel C. Lang
- Russell Hicks as Steve Hughes

== Production ==
Norman Krasna, who wrote the screenplay, sold it to MGM in March 1949 for more than $100,000. Krasna also produced and directed the film.

In July 1949, June Allyson was announced as the female lead and Montgomery Clift was courted to play her costar. However, by the end of the month, Van Johnson and Elizabeth Taylor were set as the stars.

== Reception ==
In a contemporary review for The New York Times, critic Thomas M. Pryor wrote: "The gag is good for some laughs the first time around, but Norman Krasna ... overworks it to a point of conscious cuteness. However, 'The Big Hangover' is not all fluff, for Mr. Krasna has developed a leading man with a purposeful slant on life. ... 'The Big Hangover,' although it runs an uneven course, still is good for some laughs and is deserving of attention."

Critic John L. Scott of the Los Angeles Times called the film "a light comedy which dips into the 'message' class now and then" wrote: "Story idea isn't too strong but the treatment is 'smart.' ... Mr. Krasna works in commentary on the selfishness of some men and their lack of 'social consciousness.' It is no diatribe and it is embellished with romance ... There is a worth-while moment when the graduating student upholds the practice of law while rehearsing his valedictory speech, and another when the poor but honest city solicitor defends his position after Johnson accuses him of toadying to the corporation attorneys."

According to MGM records, the film earned $1,320,000 in the U.S. and Canada and $306,000 overseas, leading to a profit of $25,000.
