= A Face in the Crowd (film) =

1957 American drama film by Elia Kazan

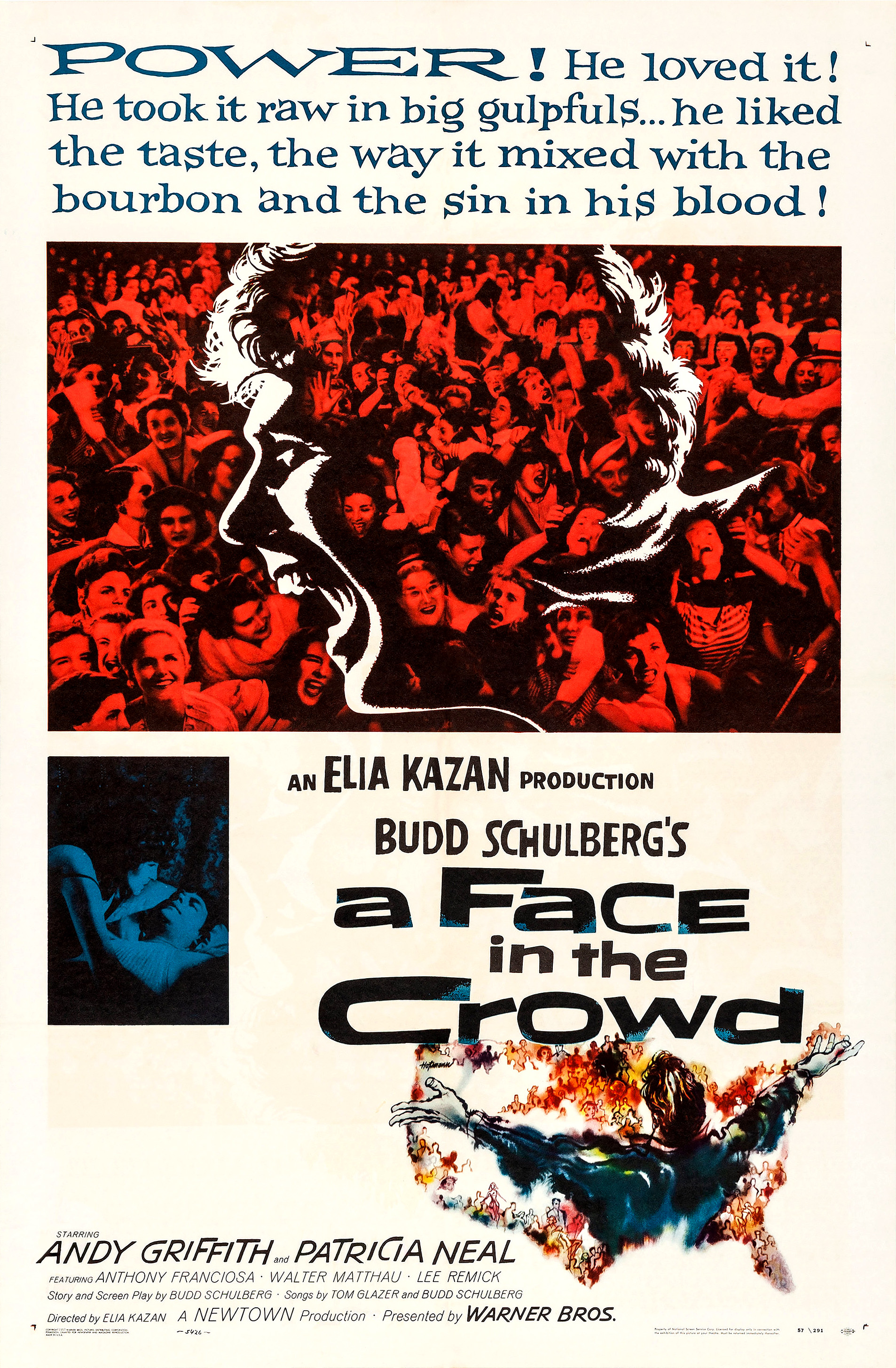
- Theatrical release poster
- Directed by: Elia Kazan
- Screenplay by: Budd Schulberg
- Based on: "Your Arkansas Traveler"; 1953 story by Budd Schulberg
- Produced by: Elia Kazan
- Starring: Andy Griffith; Patricia Neal; Anthony Franciosa; Walter Matthau; Lee Remick
- Cinematography: Gayne Rescher; Harry Stradling
- Edited by: Gene Milford
- Music by: Tom Glazer
- Distributed by: Warner Bros. Pictures
- Release date: May 28, 1957
- Running time: 125 minutes
- Country: United States
- Language: English

A Face in the Crowd is a 1957 American satirical drama film directed by Elia Kazan and starring Andy Griffith (in his film debut), Patricia Neal, and Walter Matthau. The screenplay by Budd Schulberg is based on his short story "Your Arkansas Traveler" from the 1953 collection Some Faces in the Crowd.

The story centers on Larry "Lonesome" Rhodes, a drifter who is discovered by the producer (Neal) of a small-market radio program in rural northeast Arkansas, and who rises to great fame and influence on national television. The character was a composite of various public figures, including Will Rogers, Huey Long, Arthur Godfrey, and Tennessee Ernie Ford.

The film launched Griffith into stardom, but it received mixed reviews on its release. Subsequent reappraisals have been kinder to the film. In 2008, it was selected for preservation in the United States National Film Registry by the Library of Congress as "culturally, historically, or aesthetically significant".

== Plot ==
In late 1950s America, radio journalist Marcia Jeffries encounters drunken drifter Larry Rhodes while recording a segment at a rural Arkansas jail. She invites him to speak to the audience and sing while playing his guitar, and his folksy charm makes him instantly popular. Marcia dubs him "Lonesome" Rhodes and fast-tracks him onto his own local radio program. Enlisting the support of show writer Mel Miller, Marcia witnesses the charismatic Rhodes ad-lib his way to Memphis-area television popularity, effectively criticizing local politicians along the way.

When Rhodes pokes fun at his sponsor's mattress company commercials, the sponsor initially pulls its ads. After Rhodes's adoring audience revolts by burning mattresses in the street, the sponsor discovers the publicity actually increased sales. Rhodes returns to the air with a new awareness of his persuasive power. He begins an affair with Marcia and proposes marriage to her.

Rhodes is offered a deal—put together without his knowledge by Joey, the overambitious assistant to the owner of the mattress company—to star in a new television show in New York. The rising star accepts the offer and signs a contract allowing Joey to manage him. Rhodes becomes the national spokesman for his show's sponsor, selling Vitajex, a faux energy and male enhancement product. His buoyant charisma tremendously increases their sales. As his fame, influence, and ego increase, Rhodes is enlisted to improve the appeal of a presidential hopeful, Senator Worthington Fuller of California, whom he rebrands as an everyman with the folksy nickname "Curly".

In contrast to his friendly onscreen persona, Rhodes has become an egomaniac who berates his staff. Marcia's hopes of marrying Rhodes are dashed when a woman claiming to be his legitimate wife demands spousal support. Assuring Marcia that he will obtain a Mexican divorce, Rhodes returns with seventeen-year-old drum majorette Betty Lou, whom he married impulsively. Devastated, Marcia reminds him of her role in his success, and Rhodes and Marcia enter into a profit-sharing agreement. Mel, who loves Marcia, leaves to write an exposé on Rhodes. Catching his young wife in an affair with Joey, Rhodes sends her back to Arkansas. Joey, who owns 51% of the company, remains unapologetic. In need of consolation, Rhodes goes to Marcia's home, telling her about his political ambitions, revealing to Marcia his opportunistic regard for her. While he falls asleep, Marcia leaves.

During the end credits of Rhodes's television show, with microphones turned off, Rhodes contemptuously mocks Fuller and the station's "idiot" viewers. Disgusted with Rhodes's behavior, Marcia activates a live microphone, exposing his disparaging comments to viewers. His popularity and the show's ratings plummet, advertisers cancel their sponsorships, and the audience and public turn against him. When Rhodes reaches his penthouse home, he finds none of the influential guests invited to a ceremonial dinner have attended. Reaching out to Marcia again for consolation, Rhodes phones her, threatening suicide. Fed-up, Marcia goads him, telling him to get out of everyone's lives, especially hers.

Having waited for Marcia to break free from Rhodes's spell, Mel insists Marcia tell Rhodes that she exposed his rant. At Rhodes's home, Mel and Marcia find Rhodes speaking to the empty room, with an applause machine replacing the people whose support he has lost. Marcia tells Rhodes she was responsible for the open-microphone incident and demands that he never call her again.

Before they leave, Mel predicts Rhodes's future: his career is not completely over, and he will likely find further television work soon, but will never again enjoy the same level of popularity and prestige. After leaving the building, Mel and Marcia hear Rhodes screaming from the penthouse for Marcia to return to him, but they ignore him as they depart. Marcia expresses guilt for having elevated Rhodes to power, and Mel replies that a faker like Rhodes may fool people for a while, but "we get wise to him―that's our strength".

== Cast ==
- Andy Griffith as Larry "Lonesome" Rhodes
- Patricia Neal as Marcia Jeffries
- Anthony Franciosa as Joey DePalma
- Walter Matthau as Mel Miller
- Lee Remick as Betty Lou Fleckum
- Percy Waram as Gen. Haynesworth
- Paul McGrath as Macey
- Rod Brasfield as Beanie
- Marshall Neilan as Senator Worthington Fuller
- Alexander Kirkland as Jim Collier
- Charles Irving as Luffler
- Howard Smith as J.B. Jeffries
- Kay Medford as First Mrs. Rhodes
- Big Jeff Bess as Sheriff Big Jeff Bess
- Henry Sharp as Abe Steiner
- Lois Nettleton as Macey's nurse (uncredited)
- Rip Torn as Barry Mills (uncredited)
- Bennett Cerf, Faye Emerson, Betty Furness, Virginia Graham, Burl Ives, Sam Levenson, Mitch Miller, John Cameron Swayze, Mike Wallace, Earl Wilson, and Walter Winchell in cameo appearances as themselves

== Production ==
Andy Griffith with Patricia Neal (right) and Lee Remick (left) on the set of A Face in the Crowd

=== Development ===
The film was produced under the working title of The Arkansas Traveler, which was the name of Budd Schulberg's source short story from his 1953 collection Some Faces in the Crowd. Schulberg had stated that a conversation with friend Will Rogers Jr., son of Will Rogers—who was known for earthy anecdotes and folksy style—had inspired him to create the Lonesome Rhodes story. During their drunken exchange, the younger Rogers had expressed bitterness about his father, stating that the elder Rogers "was so full of shit, because he pretends he's just one of the people, just one of the guys" whereas privately he associated only with high society.

Director Elia Kazan and Schulberg based the character of Lonesome Rhodes on Arthur Godfrey, as well as on Billy Graham and Huey Long. Other inspirations for Rhodes' public persona included performers like Tennessee Ernie Ford, Red Foley and Cliffie Stone.

=== Casting ===
In April 1956, columnist Walter Winchell wrote that Andy Griffith was due to leave the cast of his Broadway show No Time for Sergeants at the end of July, vacation for a month and begin shooting the film. Kazan and Schulberg spent much of July and August in Memphis and in Arkansas. Patricia Neal's involvement was announced by early August.

Griffith, Lee Remick, Charles Irving, Charles Nelson Reilly and uncredited actors Lois Nettleton and Rip Torn all made their film debuts in A Face in the Crowd.

On the set, Griffith faced difficulty generating the intensity of the stage and asked to have discarded chairs available to destroy in order to instigate his rage before filming.

Big Jeff Bess, who portrayed the sheriff under his own name, was a country singer and bandleader in Nashville who led Big Jeff and his Radio Playboys. Cameo appearances in the film include those by Walter Winchell and Mike Wallace.

=== Filming ===
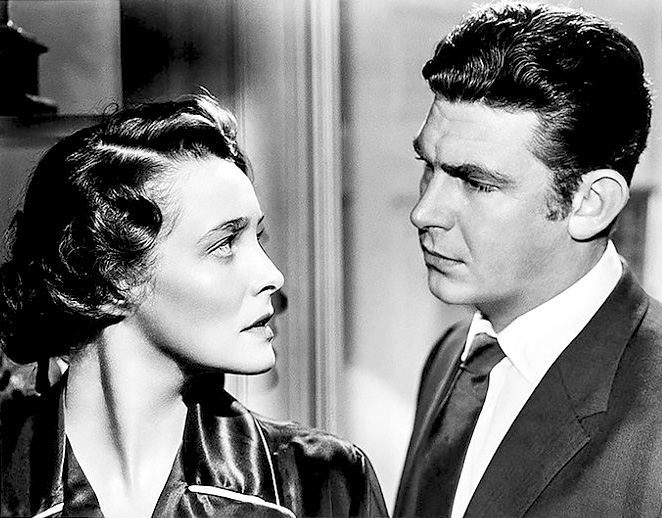
Patricia Neal and Andy Griffith

Location shooting occurred in Memphis, Piggott, Arkansas and Poplar Bluff, Missouri, where the fair and baton-twirling competition scenes were filmed. The Poplar Bluff scenes involved 5,000 extras paid $1 per hour, 380 dogs and baton twirlers and musicians from six high school bands from Arkansas and Missouri. Remick spent two weeks in Piggott with a teenage baton twirler to improve her twirling skill and local accent, although a double was utilized for several baton-twirling scenes.

Shooting in New York included 61 sets at Biograph Studios in the Bronx, as well as some exteriors. The scene of the network headquarters switchboard was NBC at 30 Rockefeller Plaza.

Schulberg remained involved throughout filming. He said, "I went on a trip in 1955 to scout a location in Arkansas, and I've been on the set every day since shooting started in August [1956]."

== Reception ==
In a contemporary review for The New York Times, critic Bosley Crowther called A Face in the Crowd a "sizzling and cynical exposure" and wrote:

Lonesome Rhodes, the two-faced hero, is pretty much the whole show, and what he symbolizes in society is barely hinted—or discreetly overlooked. ... Everyone condescends to him—in the script of Mr. Schulberg, that is—instead of taking positive positions that would better represent reality. ... [A]ll play their roles capably, but they're forced to behave as awed observers, not as flexible factors in the scheme of things. As a consequence, the dominance of the hero and his monstrous momentum, driven home by a vast accumulation of TV detail and Mr. Kazan's staccato style, eventually become a bit monotonous when they are not truly opposed. Reality is proved by inadvertence. We finally get bored with Lonesome Rhodes. Thus the dubious device of having his girl friend switch him on the air when he thinks he is finished with his program (and is scorning his public) is inane. This type would either have become a harmless habit or the public would have been finished with him!

Harrison's Reports wrote: "On a whole, however, it is a fascinating picture, superbly directed and finely acted. Much credit for the film's impact is due [to] Andy Griffith, a newcomer to the screen, for his exceptional performance in the principal role. It is not a sympathetic part, but he plays it with explosive vigor and makes the characterization entirely believable. Worthy of special mention, too, is Patricia Neal for her fine portrayal" as Marcia Jeffries.

Hy Hollinger of Variety praised the film as "provocative and hard-hitting", summarizing that "Kazan once again demonstrates his ability as a director and why major studios are willing to give him carte blanche in selecting his own story material and working under his own conditions".

Edwin Schallert of the Los Angeles Times wrote, "Far and away outstanding in their stellar performances are Griffith, Miss Neal and Matthau, with Franciosa also very capable. They are nearly all at their peaks in their interpretations, even though the actual reading of lines is not too easy to understand at times. Schulberg has, however, written a splendid screenplay, and the picture is by far one of Kazan's most penetrating and incidentally ironic."

In his review for Cahiers du cinéma, critic François Truffaut called it "a great and beautiful work whose importance transcends the dimensions of a cinema review".

Karel Reisz, reviewing the film in Sight & Sound, critiqued more harshly, writing, "If we are to accept its attack on the jungle values of American sponsored television then we must be able to sense a more decent, rational tone in the film which is attacking them. And this becomes more and more difficult as the film goes on. When it comes to the test Kazan and Schulberg seem to have little more respect for their audience than the [t]elevision showmen. Dramatic scenes are all played at full blast, while the more intimate scenes are slurred over."

In a 2015 interview, filmmaker Spike Lee credited the film with inspiring his Bamboozled (2000). Writing in The Washington Post in 2020, Ann Hornaday ranked it at number 14 of her list of the best political movies.

On the review aggregator website Rotten Tomatoes, 95% of 81 critics' reviews are positive. The website's consensus reads: "A raucous Andy Griffith channels the corruptive influence of celebrity in Elia Kazan's A Face in the Crowd, a prescient critique of American media."

== Musical ==
A stage musical version of A Face in the Crowd directed by Kwame Kwei-Armah began a run at the Young Vic in London on September 10, 2024. Its music is composed by Elvis Costello and the script is an adaptation of Budd Schulberg's book by Sarah Ruhl.

== See also ==
- List of American films of 1957
- The Great Man
