= The Merchant of Yonkers =

1938 play by Thornton Wilder

- First edition 1939
- Written by: Thornton Wilder
- Based on: Einen Jux will er sich machen by Johann Nestroy and Adolf Müller Sr.

Premiere
- Date: December 28, 1938
- Place: Guild Theatre, New York City

The Merchant of Yonkers is a 1938 play by Thornton Wilder.

== History ==
The Merchant of Yonkers had its origins in an 1835 one-act farce A Day Well Spent by the English dramatist John Oxenford. In 1842 A Day Well Spent was extended into a full-length play entitled He'll Have Himself a Good Time by Austrian playwright Johann Nestroy with music by Adolf Müller Sr. Wilder adapted this version into an Americanized comedy entitled The Merchant of Yonkers, which revolves around Horace Vandergelder, a wealthy Yonkers, New York businessman in the market for a wife.

== Productions ==
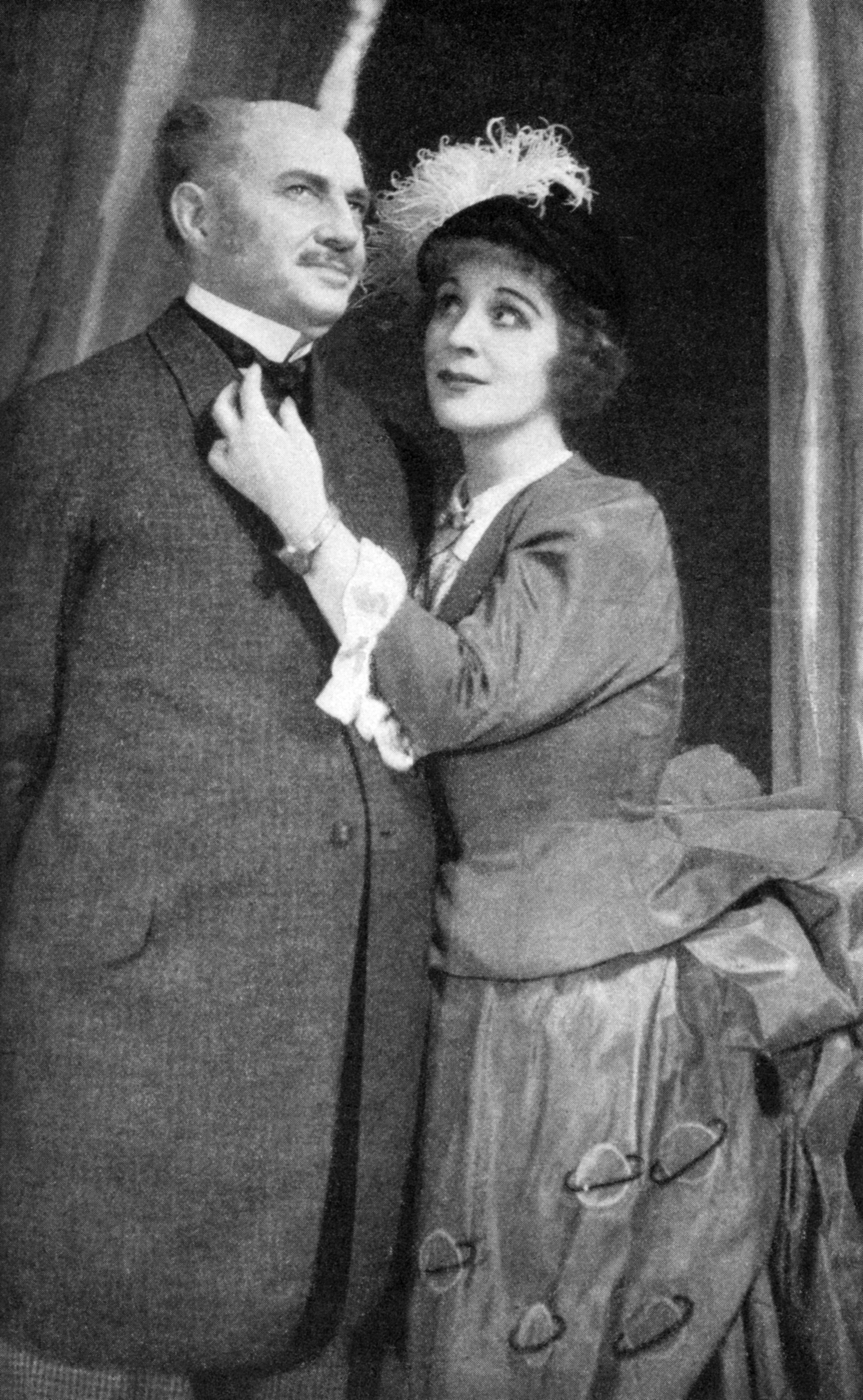
Percy Waram and Jane Cowl in the Broadway production of The Merchant of Yonkers (1938)

Produced by Herman Shumlin and directed by Max Reinhardt, The Merchant of Yonkers opened on Broadway December 28, 1938, at the Guild Theatre. Boris Aronson created the scenic design. The production ran through January 1939, for 39 performances, with the following among the opening night cast:

- Percy Waram as Horace Vandergelder
- Jane Cowl as Dolly Gallagher Levi
- Tom Ewell as Cornelius Hackl
- Philip Coolidge as Joe Scanlon
- Bartlett Robinson as Ambrose Kemper
- Joseph Sweeney as Melchior Stack
- June Walker as Mrs. Molloy
- Nydia Westman as Minnie Fay

== Rewrite ==
In 1954, at the request of Edinburgh Festival director Tyrone Guthrie, Wilder made what he later termed "minor revisions" to his original script and rechristened the piece The Matchmaker, under which title it was presented in Edinburgh, followed by a West End theatre production in London which opened at Theatre Royal Haymarket on November 4, 1954. An American production of the revised play opened on Broadway on December 5, 1955, with Ruth Gordon as Dolly and had a far more successful run of 486 performances, followed by a motion picture version starring Shirley Booth as Dolly. The Matchmaker later served as the basis for Jerry Herman's 1964 musical hit Hello, Dolly!, running for 2,844 performances.
