= Posse mit Gesang =

Form of popular German-language music drama, farce

Posse mit Gesang ("farce with singing", plural: Possen) is a form of popular German-language music drama, that developed in the late 18th and early 19th centuries. Early examples are sometimes called Possenspil or Possenspiel. It is also sometimes referred to simply as Posse (farce).

Associated with Vienna, and also Berlin and Hamburg, the Posse mit Gesang was similar to the Singspiel, but generally had more action and less music than the more operatic form. Viennese examples included Ferdinand Raimund's Der Alpenkönig und der Menschenfeind of 1828 and many of the works of Johann Nestroy. Composers who contributed music for Posse included Wenzel Müller, Conradin Kreutzer, and Philip Jakob Riotte.

Some 20th-century examples of posse written by Walter Kollo were Filmzauber (1912) and Wie einst im Mai (1913).

More specialized examples of the genre were Lokalposse (daily life themes), Zauberposse (magic), Charakterposse (personalities), Situationsposse (situations), and Parodierende Posse (parodies).

== Other examples of Posse mit Gesang ==
- 1820: Die Zwillingsbrüder by Franz Schubert, Vienna, Theater am Kärntnertor
- 1826: Herr Josef und Frau Baberl by Wenzel Müller, Vienna, Theater in der Leopoldstadt
- 1842: Einen Jux will er sich machen by Johann Nestroy (text) and Adolf Müller (music)
- 1889: Wiener Luft by Karl Michael Ziehrer, Vienna, Theater an der Wien
