= The Matchmaker (play) =

Play written by Thornton Wilder

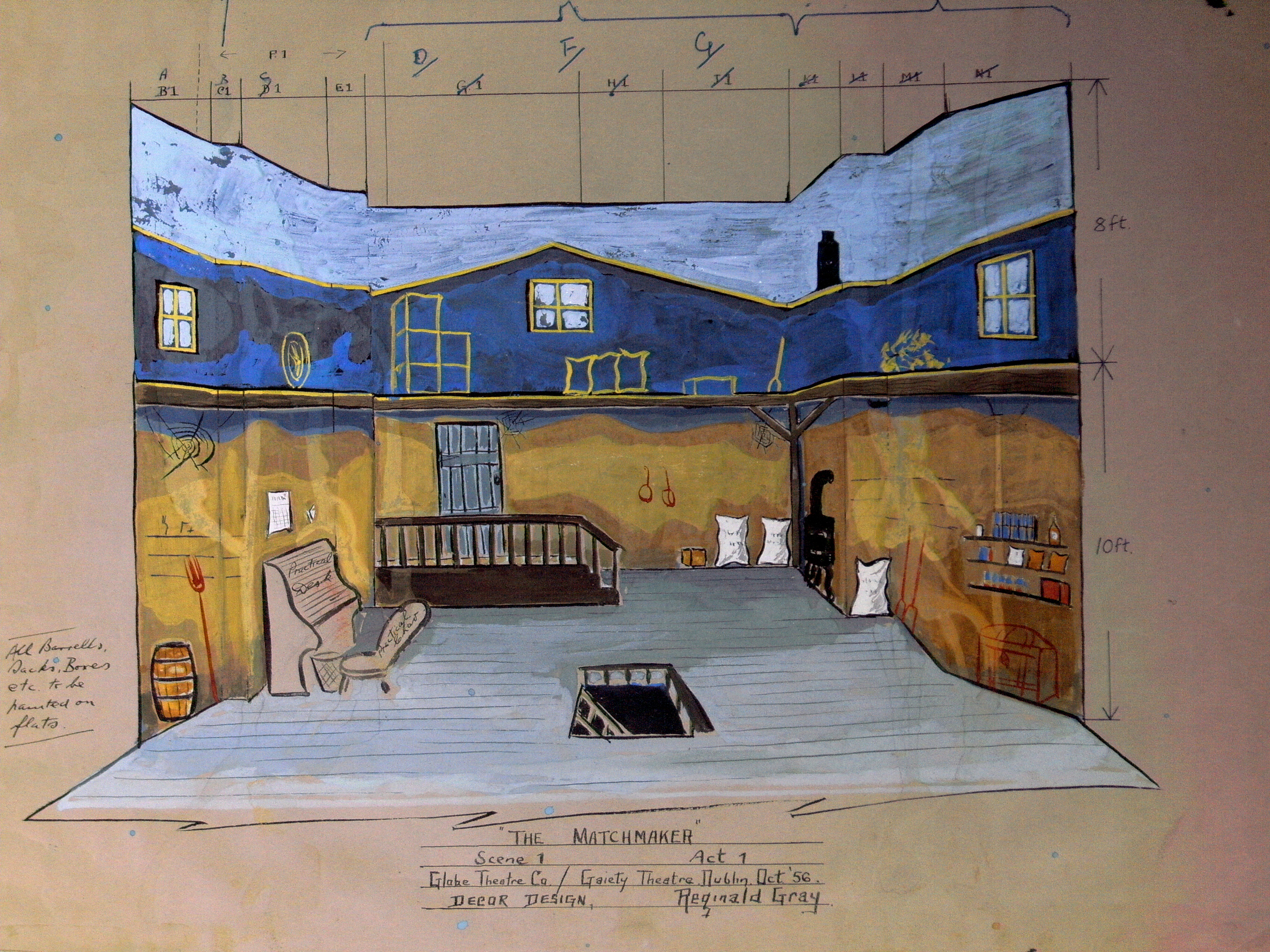
- The Matchmaker theatrical set drawing by Bernard Gray
- Written by: Thornton Wilder
- Characters: Horace Vandergelder; Dolly Gallagher Levi; Irene Molloy; Minnie Fay; Cornelius Hackl; Barnaby Tucker; Ermengarde; Miss Flora Van Husen; Malachi Stack; Ambrose Kemper; Gertrude; Miss Van Husen's Cook; Rudolf; Joe Scanlon; August
- Setting: New York City

Premiere
- Date: 1954
- Place: Broadway

The Matchmaker is a 1954 Broadway play by Thornton Wilder, a rewritten version of his 1938 play The Merchant of Yonkers.

== History ==
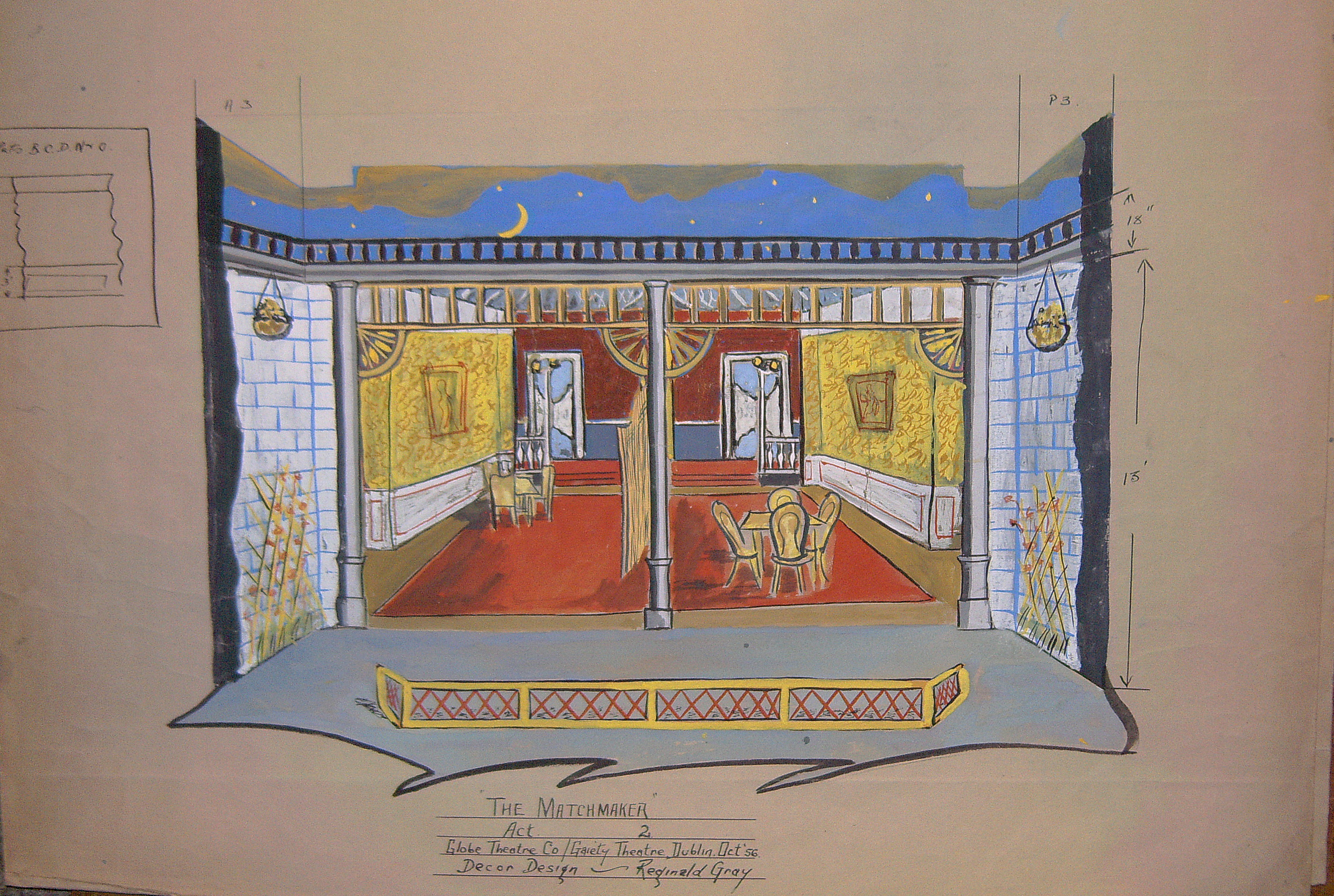
Theatre decor of ACT 2

The play has a long and colorful history. John Oxenford's 1835 one-act farce A Day Well Spent had been extended into the full-length play Einen Jux will er sich machen (He'll Have Himself a Good Time) by Austrian playwright Johann Nestroy in 1842. In 1938, Wilder adapted Nestroy's version into the Americanized comedy The Merchant of Yonkers, which attracted the attention of German director Max Reinhardt, who mounted a Broadway production, which was a flop, running for only 39 performances.

Fifteen years later, director Tyrone Guthrie expressed interest in a new production of the play, which Wilder extensively rewrote and rechristened The Matchmaker. The most significant change was the expansion of a previously minor character named Dolly Gallagher Levi, who became the play's centerpiece. A widow who brokers marriages and other transactions in Yonkers, New York at the turn of the 20th century, she sets her sights on local merchant Horace Vandergelder, who has hired her to find him a wife. After a series of slapstick situations involving mistaken identities, secret rendezvous behind carefully placed screens, separated lovers, and a trip to night court, everyone finds themselves paired with a perfect match.

== Productions ==
The play, starring Ruth Gordon as Dolly and Sam Levene as Horace Vandergelder, debuted at the Edinburgh Festival in Scotland on November 4, 1954; at the Edinburgh Festival, in Berlin—for the troops and at the Theatre Royal Haymarket in London's West End. Due to a salary dispute with Broadway producer David Merrick, Sam Levene left the production after playing the role of Horace Vandergelder for over a year in Europe. Loring Smith replaced Levene as Horace Vandergelder and opened on Broadway December 5, 1955 at the Royale Theatre, later transferring to the Booth to complete its run of 486 performances. Ruth Gordon's performance in the title role earned her a Tony Award nomination as Best Actress; Guthrie won as Best Director.

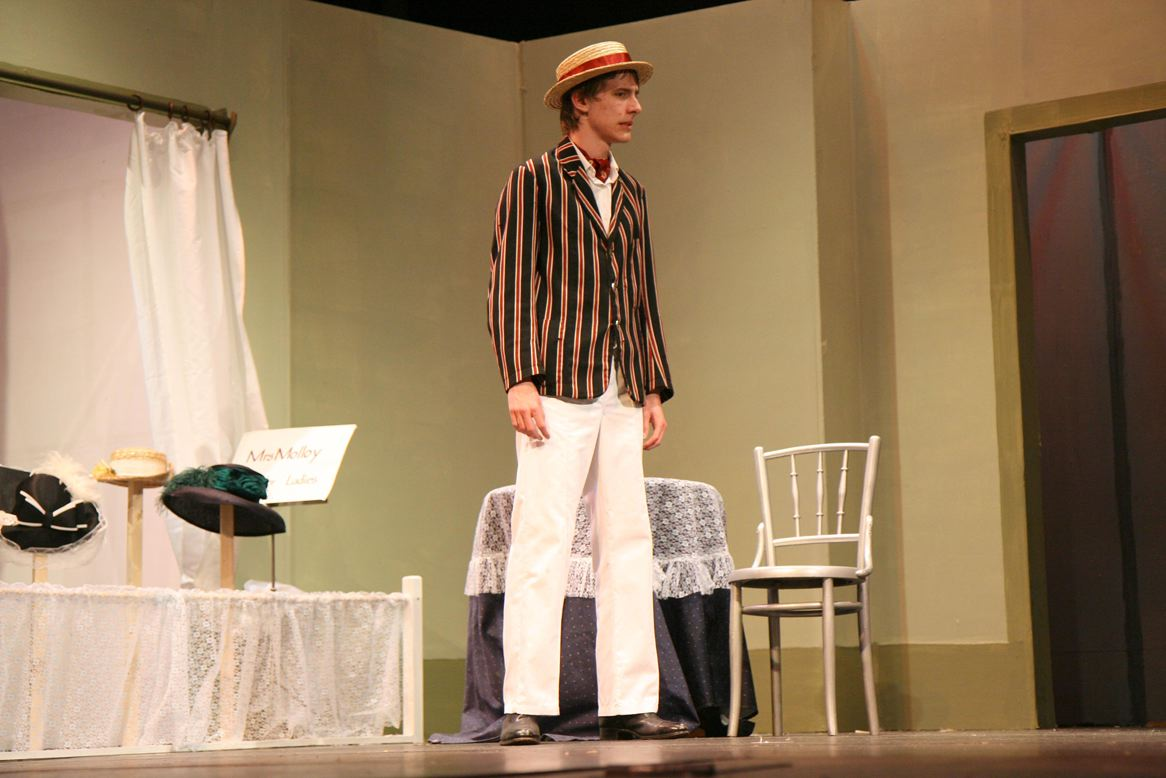
A production of The Matchmaker at the Thwaits Empire Theatre, in Blackburn, England

=== Characters and original Broadway cast ===
The characters and original cast of The Matchmaker are recorded at the Internet Broadway Database.

- Horace Vandergelder, a Merchant of Yonkers – Loring Smith
- Mrs. Dolly Gallagher Levi, a Friend of Vandergelder's Late Wife – Ruth Gordon
- Irene Molloy, a Milliner – Eileen Herlie
- Minnie Fay, Mrs. Molloy's Assistant – Rosamund Greenwood
- Cornelius Hackl, a Clerk in Vandergelder's Store – Arthur Hill
- Barnaby Tucker, an Apprentice in Vandergelder's Store – Robert Morse
- Ermengarde, Mr. Vandergelder's niece, whom Ambrose wants to marry — Prunella Scales
- Miss Flora Van Husen, a Friend of Vandergelder's Late Wife – Esme Church
- Malachi Stack – Patrick McAlinney
- Ambrose Kemper, an Artist – Alexander Davion
- Gertrude, Vandergelder's Housekeeper – Charity Grace
- Miss Van Husen's Cook – Christine Thomas
- Rudolf, a Waiter – William Lanteau
- Joe Scanlon, a Barber – Philip Leeds
- August, a Waiter – John Mulligan

== Adaptations ==
The 1958 film version, adapted by John Michael Hayes and directed by Joseph Anthony, starred Shirley Booth as Dolly, Anthony Perkins as Cornelius, Shirley MacLaine as Irene, Paul Ford as Vandergelder, and Robert Morse reprising his Broadway role as Barnaby.

The story enjoyed yet another incarnation in 1964 when David Merrick, who had produced the 1955 Broadway play, partnered with composer Jerry Herman to mount the hugely successful, Tony Award-winning musical Hello, Dolly! starring Carol Channing.

A film version of Hello, Dolly! was released in 1969 starring Barbra Streisand in the lead role.

== See also ==
- On the Razzle, 1981 farce by Tom Stoppard also based on the 1842 musical Einen Jux will er sich machen
