= Adolf Müller Sr. =

Austrian-Hungarian actor and composer

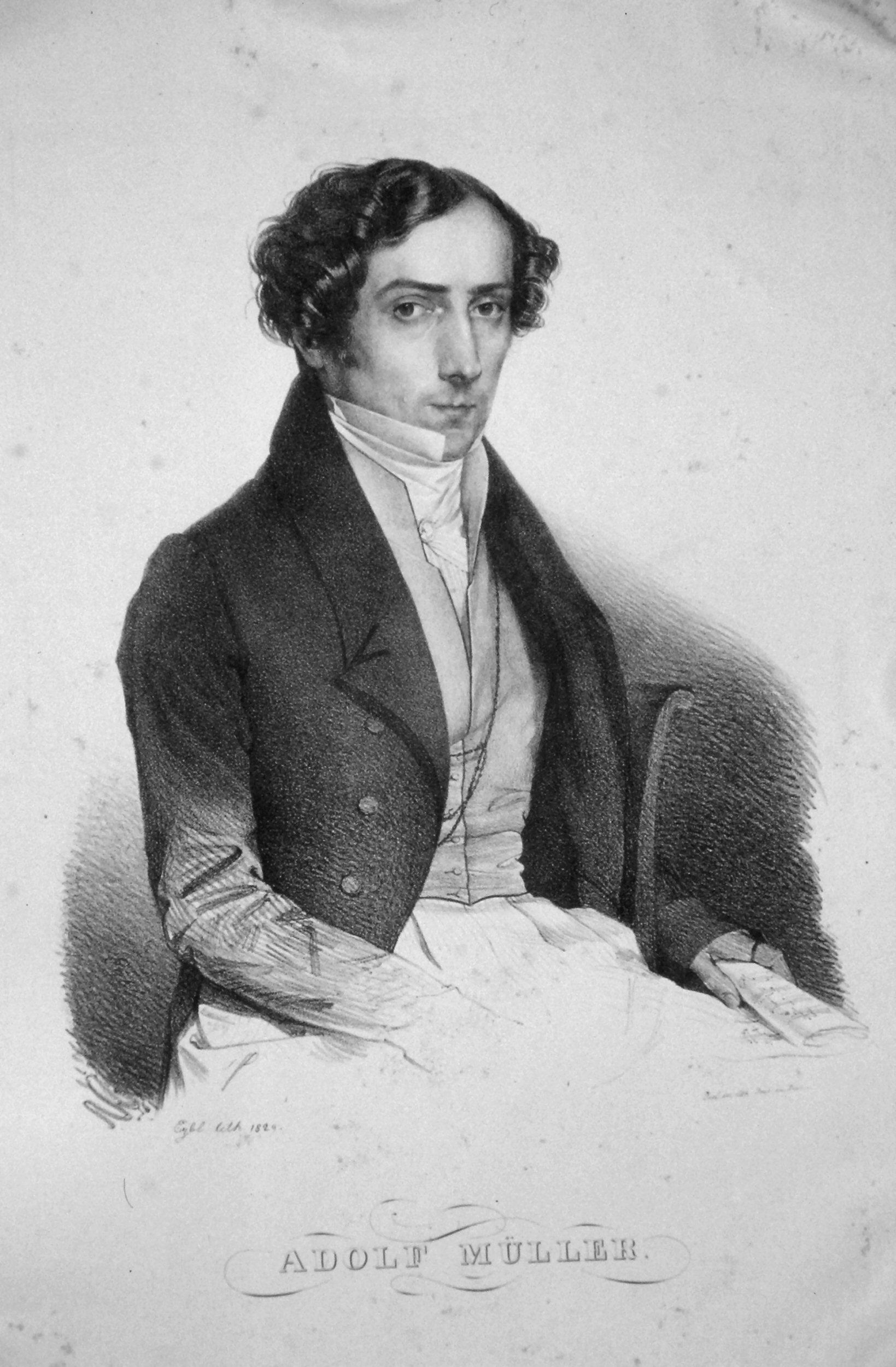
Portrait of Adolf Müller Sr. by Franz Eybl, (1829).

Adolf Müller Sr. (7 October 1801 – 29 July 1886) was a composer from the Austrian Empire and late Austria-Hungary. After an early career as an actor and singer, he composed operettas for theatres in Vienna. His son Adolf Müller Jr. was also a composer.

== Early life and career ==
He was born in Tolna, Kingdom of Hungary, then part of the Habsburg Monarchy and shortly after made part of the Austrian Empire; his original name was Schmid. His parents died when he was young, and he grew up with his aunt and uncle in Brno. His early music lessons were from Joseph Rieger, organist at the Church of St James in Brno. Aged eight he played piano in public concerts; later, helped by his uncle, he appeared in theatres as singer and actor. He was also interested in composition and composed songs and piano pieces.

From 1823 Müller lived in Vienna. There he studied composition with Joseph von Blumenthal. His first operetta Wer andern eine Grube gräbt, fällt selbst hinein ("He who digs a hole for another, falls into it himself") was produced in December 1825 at the Theater in der Josefstadt; in the following year his operetta Die schwarze Frau was produced, and was very successful.

He was engaged in 1826 as a singer in the court opera ensemble at the Theater am Kärntnertor. He composed for this theatre the operetta Die erste Zusammenkunft; as a result he became conductor at the theatre, and a new operetta was commissioned.

In 1827 he was one of the pallbearers at Beethoven's funeral.

== Composer and conductor ==
In 1828 Müller gave up stage performing, and became composer and conductor at the Theater an der Wien, for the theatre manager Carl Carl; during the following years he composed much music. In 1838 Carl Carl bought the Theater in der Leopoldstadt, and Müller also worked for that theatre.

From 1847 he left the Theater in der Leopoldstadt and worked at the Theater an der Wien, which by then was managed by Franz Pokorny. He continued to compose; his works were performed in many theatres in Vienna.

He composed until the 1860s. He wrote a great amount of music for the plays of Johann Nestroy, Ludwig Anzengruber and others; Müller's music was an influence on the development of Viennese operetta. He also wrote a large number of songs with piano accompaniment, and several works for piano and for physharmonica.

== Family ==
His son Adolf Müller Jr. (1839–1901) conducted the opera orchestra in Posen (now Poznań in Poland) in 1864, and later worked in Magdeburg, Düsseldorf, Rotterdam and at the Theater an der Wien in Vienna, where he initially assisted his father. He composed operas, operettas, Singspiele and incidental music to plays. He compiled the music for the operetta Wiener Blut from existing music by Johann Strauss II.
