= Johann Nestroy =

Austrian playwright, actor and singer

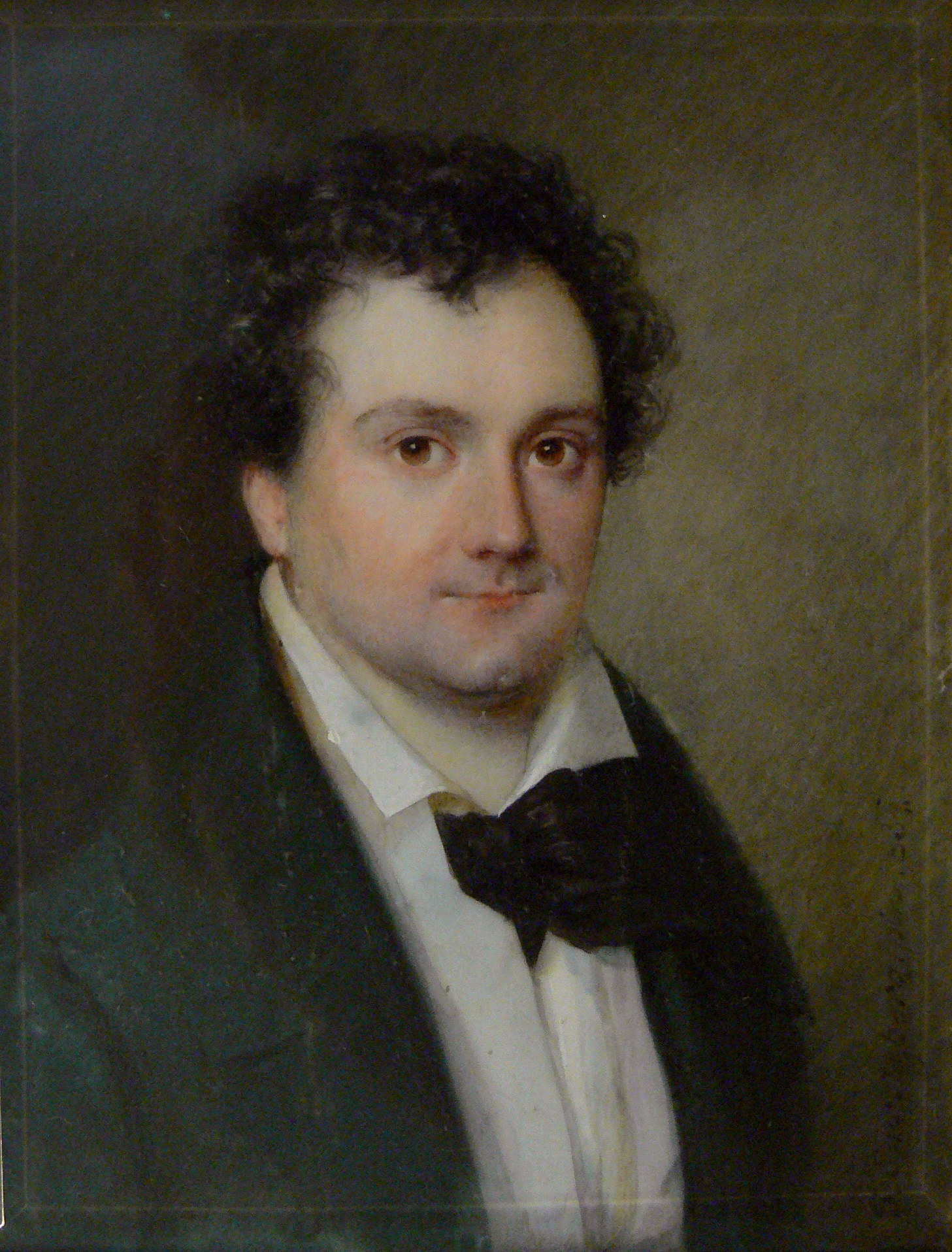
Johann Nestroy by Franz Schrotzberg (1834)

Johann Nepomuk Eduard Ambrosius Nestroy (German: [ˈnɛstrɔɪ̯]; 7 December 1801 – 25 May 1862) was a singer, actor and playwright in the popular Austrian tradition of the Biedermeier period and its immediate aftermath. He participated in the 1848 revolutions and his work reflects the new liberal spirit then spreading throughout Europe.

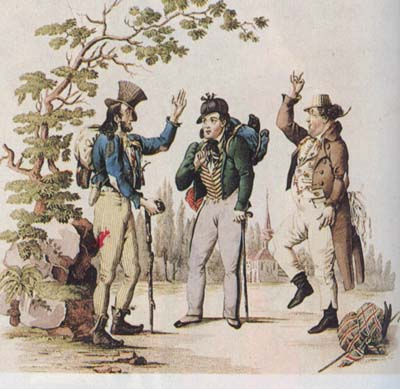
Nestroy with Karl Treumann and Wenzel Scholz in Der böse Geist Lumpazivagabundus (1833)

== Career ==
Nestroy was born in Vienna, where he was a law student from 1817 to 1822, before abandoning his studies to become a singer. He joined the Theater am Kärntnertor, beginning with Sarastro in The Magic Flute on 24 August 1822. He also played Don Fernando in Beethoven’s Fidelio on 3 November 1822. After a year of singing in Vienna, he went to Amsterdam where he appeared in baritone roles for two years at the local German Theatre. From 1825 to 1831 he accepted engagements to sing and act in Brünn (now Brno), Graz, Pressburg (now Bratislava), Klagenfurt, Vienna and Lemberg (now Lviv). He then returned to his native Vienna and started to write and continued to perform.

Nestroy's career as a playwright was an immediate success: his 1833 play Der böse Geist Lumpazivagabundus (The evil spirit Lumpazivagabundus) was a major hit. He soon became a leading figure in Austrian culture and society. Nestroy succeeded Ferdinand Raimund as the leading actor-dramatist on the Volkstheater, the Viennese commercial stage or 'people's theatre'.

Whereas Raimund concentrated on romantic and magical fantasies, Nestroy used comedy for parody and criticism. Working at the time of conservative minister Klemens von Metternich, he had to carefully draft his plays to skirt the strict censorship in place. His interest in word play was legendary, and his characters often mixed Viennese German with less-than-successful attempts at more "educated" speech. Music held an important role in his work, with songs elaborating the theme or helping on with the plot.

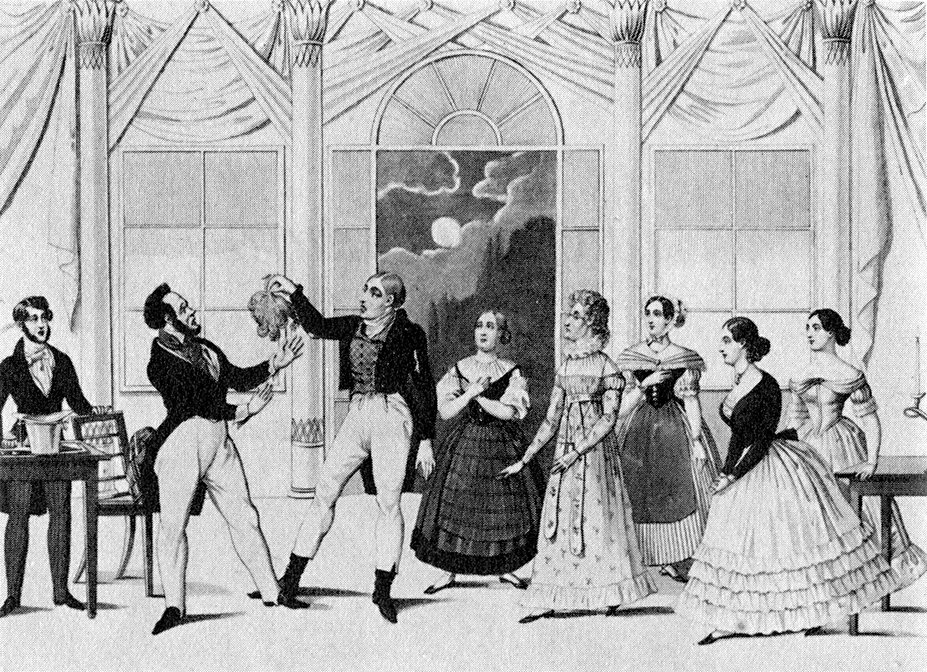
Der Talisman, 1840: climactic scene when the male lead removes his wig to reveal his red hair

Nestroy wrote nearly eighty comedies between the 1830s and the 1850s. Among the most important were Der böse Geist Lumpacivagabundus, Liebesgeschichten und Heurathssachen, Der Talisman (made into the 1939 musical comedy Titus macht Karriere by Edmund Nick), Einen Jux will er sich machen (translated as On the Razzle by Tom Stoppard in 1981) and Der Zerrissene, all of which were marked by social criticism and biting satire. He died in Graz, Austria.

== Works ==
Nestroy remained a singer all his life, and virtually all his plays include music. He worked closely with a relatively small number of composers: Adolf Müller senior, who set 41 of Nestroy's texts between 1832 and 1847, Michael Hebenstreit, who set 10 works from 1843 to 1850, Carl Binder, who set seven from 1851 to 1859, as well as Anton M. Storch, Franz Roser, Carl Franz Stenzel, and Andreas Skutta.

Most of his works were designated as some form of Posse or farce, and of these the majority were Possen mit Gesang (i.e. 'with singing'). He also produced a number of parodies, both of operas (including Cendrillion, La Cenerentola, Lohengrin, Martha, Robert le diable, Tannhäuser and Zampa) and dramas (including Karl von Holtei's Lorbeerbaum und Bettelstab and Raupach's Robert der Teufel). In addition he wrote four Quodlibets, two Burlesken, a Travestie and finally an Operette using music by Jacques Offenbach.

His early works were performed in Graz and Pressburg, then from 1832 to 1846 he worked exclusively at the Theater an der Wien, where 45 of his plays were premiered. After two productions at the Theater in der Leopoldstadt, he moved to the Carltheater from 1847 to 1859, where another 20 were performed.

== Legacy ==
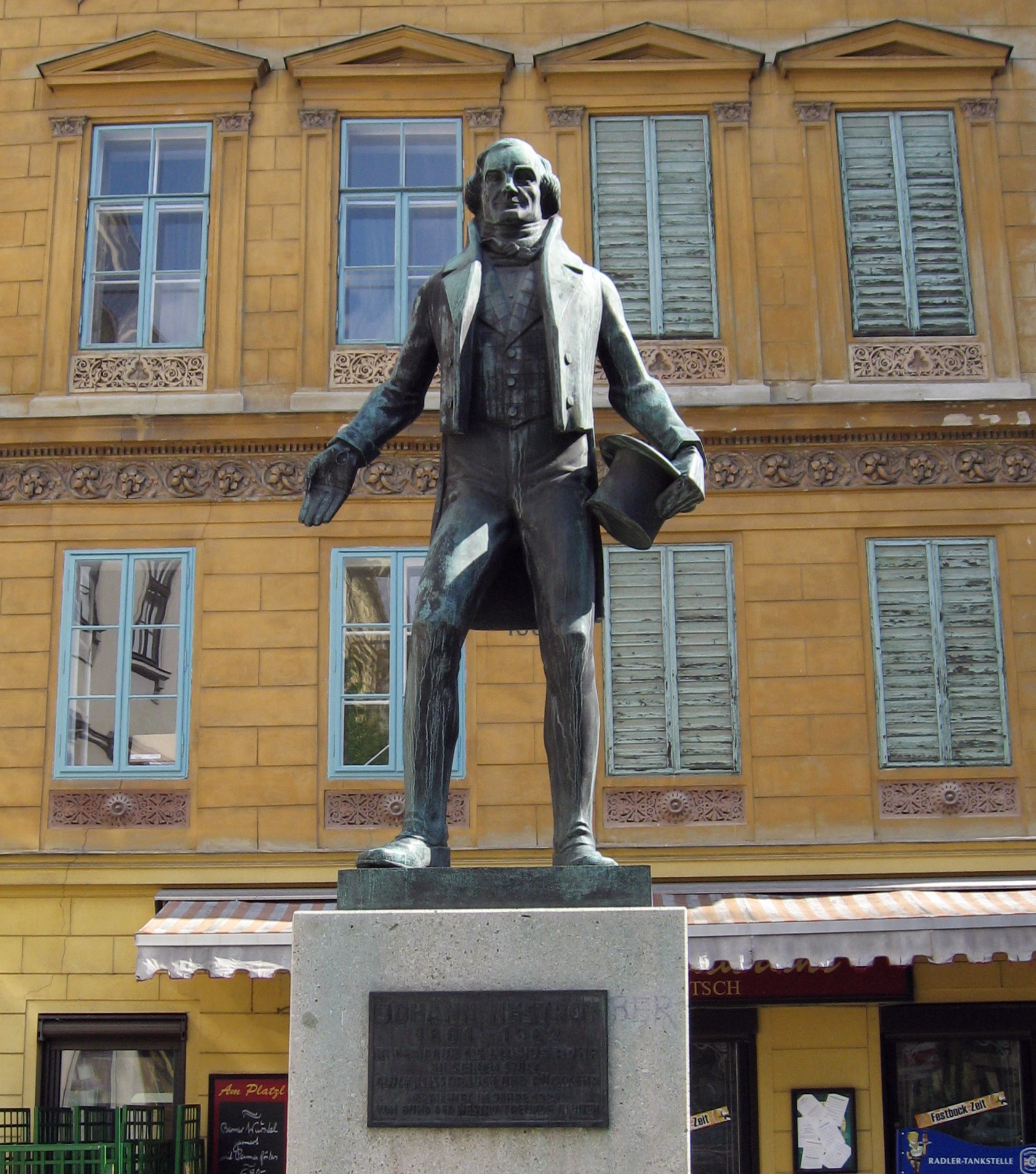
Statue of Nestroy, near Nestroyplatz, Vienna

About half of Nestroy's works have been revived by the modern German-speaking theatres and many are part and parcel of today's Viennese repertoire. However, few have ever been translated into English. Only one, Einen Jux will er sich machen, has become well known to English-speaking theatregoers. It has become a classic more than once. It was first adapted as Thornton Wilder's 1938 play The Merchant of Yonkers, which Wilder rewrote in 1954 as The Matchmaker. That version later became the 1964 musical Hello, Dolly! and 1969 film of the same name. Nestroy's original play later achieved success as the 1981 play On the Razzle, which was translated by Stephen Plaice and adapted by Tom Stoppard.

Nestroy has a square—Nestroyplatz—named after him in Vienna, as well as the station Nestroyplatz on Line 1 of the Vienna U-Bahn, which opened in 1979. When the Reichsbrücke had to be rebuilt after its collapse in 1976, the tender was won by a consortium named Project Johann Nestroy. The official name of the newly built bridge is probably Johann Nestroy Brücke, but that name doesn't seem to have any currency.

One of the most important German speaking theatre awards is named after Nestroy. The Nestroy Theatre Prize is an annual award for primarily Austrian theatre with Oscar-like categories. Its ceremony is held in Vienna and broadcast live on national television.

The Austrian illustrator and painter Reinhard Trinkler adapted Nestroy's play Der Talisman for a graphic novel of the same name.

Austrian philosopher Ludwig Wittgenstein quotes Nestroy's play Der Schützling at the very beginning of his magnum opus, the Philosophical Investigations (1953): "Anyway, the thing about progress is that it looks much greater than it really is."

== See also ==
- List of Austrian writers
