= List of compositions by Paul Hindemith =

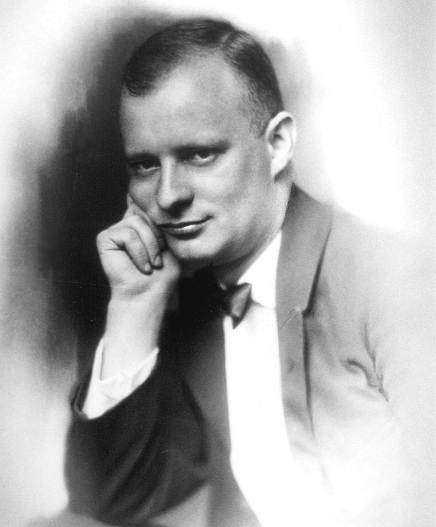
Paul Hindemith aged 28.

This is a list of the works of the German composer Paul Hindemith (1895–1963).

== Operas ==
- Mörder, Hoffnung der Frauen, in one act, on a libretto by Oskar Kokoschka (1919; premiered 1921)
- Das Nusch-Nuschi, in one act, on a libretto by Franz Blei (1920; premiered 1921)
- Sancta Susanna, in one act, on a libretto by August Stramm (1921; premiered 1922)
- Cardillac, in three acts, on a libretto by Ferdinand Lion after E. T. A. Hoffmann's Das Fräulein von Scuderi (premiered 1926; revised version premiered 1952)
- Hin und zurück, an operatic 'sketch' in one scene, on a libretto by Marcellus Schiffer (premiered 1927)
- Neues vom Tage, a comic opera (Lustige Oper), on a libretto by Marcellus Schiffer (premiered 1929; revised version premiered 1954)
- Lehrstück, music to a Lehrstück in seven scenes by Bertolt Brecht (premiered 1929)
- Wir bauen eine Stadt, a Schuloper, on a libretto by Robert Seitz (premiered 1930)
- Mathis der Maler, in 7 scenes, on a libretto by the composer (1935; premiered 1938)
- Die Harmonie der Welt, in 5 acts, on a libretto by the composer (1957; premiered 1957)
- The Long Christmas Dinner, in one act, on a libretto by Thornton Wilder (premiered 1961)

== Oratorio ==
- Das Unaufhörliche (1931)
- When Lilacs Last in the Dooryard Bloom'd: (A Requiem for those we love), for mezzo-soprano and baritone soloists, chorus, and orchestra, based on the poem by Walt Whitman (1946)

== Ballets ==
- Der Dämon, Op. 28 (1922)
- Triadisches Ballett, with Oskar Schlemmer (1923)
- Nobilissima Visione, with Léonide Massine (1938)
- The Four Temperaments (scored for piano and strings) (1940)
- Hérodiade, with Martha Graham (1944)

== Orchestral ==
- Lustige Sinfonietta, Op. 4 (1916)
- Ragtime (wohltemperiert) (1921)
- Concerto for Orchestra, Op. 38 (1925)
- Konzertmusik for wind orchestra, Op. 41 (1926)
- Fünf Stücke für Streichorchester (Five Pieces for String Orchestra) (1927)
- Konzertmusik for brass and string orchestra, Op. 50 (1930)
- Philharmonic Concerto (Variations for Orchestra) (1932)
- Symphony: Mathis der Maler (1933/34)
- Symphonic Dances (1937)
- Nobilissima Visione, suite drawn from the ballet Saint Francis (1938)
- Symphony in E♭ (1940)
- Amor und Psyche (Overture to a ballet) (1943)
- Symphonic Metamorphosis of Themes by Carl Maria von Weber (1943)
- Symphonia Serena (1946)
- Sinfonietta in E major (1949)
- Die Harmonie der Welt Symphony (1951)
- Symphony in B♭ for concert band (1951)
- Pittsburgh Symphony (1958)
- Marsch über den alten "Schweizerton" (1960)

== Concertante ==
- Cello Concerto, Op. 3 (1916)
- Kammermusik (1922–27)
  - Kammermusik No. 1 for 12 instruments, Op. 24/1 (1921)
  - Kammermusik No. 2 for piano and 12 instruments, Op. 36/1 (1925)
  - Kammermusik No. 3 for cello and 10 instruments, Op. 36/2 (1925)
  - Kammermusik No. 4 for violin and large chamber orchestra, Op. 36/3 (1925)
  - Kammermusik No. 5 for viola and large chamber orchestra, Op. 36/4 (1927)
  - Kammermusik No. 6 for viola d'amore and 13 instruments, Op. 46/1 (1927)
  - Kammermusik No. 7 for organ and 15 instruments, Op. 46/2 (1927)
- Klaviermusik mit Orchester for left-hand piano and orchestra, Op. 29 (1923)
- Konzertmusik for viola and large chamber orchestra, Op. 48 (1930)
- Konzertmusik for piano, brass and harps, Op. 49 (1930)
- "Konzert für Trautonium in Begleitung des Streichorchesters" (1931)
- Der Schwanendreher for viola and small orchestra (1935)
- Trauermusik for viola and string orchestra (1936)
- Violin Concerto (1939)
- Cello Concerto (1940)
- Piano Concerto (1945)
- Clarinet Concerto (1947)
- Horn Concerto (1949)
- Concerto for Flute, Oboe, Clarinet, Bassoon, Harp and Orchestra (1949)
- Concerto for Trumpet, Bassoon and Strings (1949)
- Organ Concerto (1962)

== Vocal ==
- Lustige Lieder in Aargauer Mundart (Merry Songs in the Aargau Dialect), Op. 5, for high voice and piano (1914–16)
- Drei Gesänge, Op. 9, for soprano and large orchestra (1917)
- Melancholie, Op. 13, 4 lieder for mezzo-soprano and string quartet, based on poems by Christian Morgenstern (1919)
- Hymns by Walt Whitman (3), for baritone and piano, Op. 14 (1919)
- Acht Gesänge, Op. 18, for soprano voice and piano (1920)
- Des Todes Tod, Op. 23a, three songs, based on poems by Eduard Reinacher, for voice, 2 violas and 2 violoncellos (1922)
- Die junge Magd, Op. 23b, six poems by Georg Trakl, for voice, flute, clarinet and string quartet (1922)
- Tuttifäntchen, Weihnachtsmärchen mit Gesang und Tanz in drei Bildern (Christmas Fairytale with singing and dancing in three scenes)
- Das Marienleben, Op. 27, song cycle for soprano and piano, based on poems by Rainer Maria Rilke, which exists in two versions. (There is also an orchestration by the composer of six of the songs from the cycle, for soprano and orchestra) (1923/48)
- Sing und Spielmusiken für Liebhaber und Musikfreunde, Op. 45 (1928/29)
  1. "Frau Musika", lyrics by Martin Luther
  2. 8 canons for voices with instruments
  3. "Ein Jäger aus Kurpfalz", for strings and woodwinds
  4. "Kleine Klaviermusik", easy pentatonic pieces
  5. "Martinslied", soloist or unison choir
- Hin und zurück, Op. 45a, sketch with music, lyrics: Marcellus Schiffer, (1927)
- Six Chansons, 6 pieces for a cappella choir, settings of French poetry by Rainer Maria Rilke (1939)
  1. "La biche"
  2. "Un cygne"
  3. "Puisque tout passe"
  4. "Printemps"
  5. "En hiver"
  6. "Verger"
- Nine English Songs (1942–43, publ. 1945)
- Apparebit repentina dies, cantata in four movements for mixed choir (SATB) and brass ensemble (4 horns (F), 2 trumpets (B♭), 3 trombones, tuba), (1947)
- Ite, angeli veloces, cantata (1955)
- 12 Fünfstimmige Madrigale for mixed chorus (1958)
- Angelus Domini apparuit, motet for soprano or tenor and piano (1958)
- Mass for mixed chorus (1963)
- ″Die Serenaden″, Op.35 (1924) for soprano voice, oboe, viola, and cello

== Chamber music ==
- String Quartets
  - String Quartet No. 1 in C, Op. 2 (1915)
  - String Quartet No. 2 in F minor, Op. 10 (1918)
  - String Quartet No. 3 in C, Op. 16 (1920)
  - String Quartet No. 4, Op. 22 (1921)
  - String Quartet No. 5, Op. 32 (1923)
  - String Quartet No. 6 in E♭ (1943)
  - String Quartet No. 7 in E♭ (1945)
- Kleine Kammermusik for wind quintet, Op. 24/2 (1922)
- Minimax – Repertorium für Militärmusik for string quartet (1923)
- Ouvertüre zum "Fliegenden Holländer", wie sie eine schlechte Kurkapelle morgens um 7 am Brunnen vom Blatt spielt, for string quartet, c. 1925
- Drei Stücke für 5 Instrumente (three pieces for five instruments) (1925) for clarinet in B♭, trumpet in C, violin, contrabass and piano
- Duet for viola and cello (1934) (also known as Scherzo)
- Vier Stücke für Fagott und Violoncello (1941) (Four Pieces for Bassoon and Cello)
- Eight Pieces for 2 violins, viola, cello and double-bass (1927)
- Octet for clarinet, bassoon, horn, violin, two violas, cello, and double bass (1958)
- Quintet for clarinet and string quartet, Op. 30 (1923, rev. 1954)
- Quartet for clarinet, violin, cello and piano (1938)
- String Trio No. 1, Op. 34 (1924)
- String Trio No. 2 (1933)
- Triosatz [retitled 'Rondo' by editor Siegfried Behrend] for three guitars (1925 or 1930)
- Trio for viola, heckelphone (or tenor saxophone) and piano, Op. 47 (1928)
- Wind Septet for flute, oboe, clarinet, bass-clarinet, bassoon, horn and trumpet (1948)
- Sonata for Four Horns (1952)
- Konzertstück for two alto saxophones (1933)
- Morgenmusik Sonata for trumpet, trombone and tuba (1932)
- Plöner Musiktag (1932): Morgenmusik von Turm zu blasen; Tafelmusik; Mahnung an die Jugend, sich der Musik zu befleissigen (cantata); Abendkonzert (trio for recorders)
- Des kleinen Elektromusikers Lieblinge, 7 pieces for three trautoniums (1930)

== Solo (and chamber music sonatas with piano) ==
- Violin
  - Sonata for Violin and Piano No. 1 in E♭, Op. 11, No. 1 (1918)
  - Sonata for Violin and Piano No. 2 in D, Op. 11, No. 2 (1918)
  - Sonata for Violin and Piano No. 3 in E (1935)
  - Sonata for Violin and Piano No. 4 in C (1939)
  - Sonata for Solo Violin No. 1, Op. 11, No. 6 (1917)
  - Sonata for Solo Violin No. 2, Op. 31, No. 1(1924)
  - Sonata for Solo Violin No. 3, Op. 31, No. 2 (1924)
- Viola
  - Sonata for Viola and Piano in F Major, Op. 11, No. 4 (1919)
  - Sonata for Viola and Piano (No.2), Op. 25 No. 4 (1922)
  - Sonata for Viola and Piano (No.3) in F (1939)
  - Sonata for Solo Viola No. 1, Op. 11, No. 5 (1919)
  - Sonata for Solo Viola No. 2, Op. 25, No. 1 (1922)
  - Sonata for Solo Viola No. 3, Op. 31, No. 4 (1923)
  - Sonata for Solo Viola No. 4 (1937)
- Viola d'Amore
  - Kleine Sonate for Viola d'amore and Piano, Op. 25, No. 2 (1922)
- Cello
  - Variations on "A Frog He Went a Courting" for Cello and Piano (1941)
  - Three Pieces for cello and piano, Op. 8 (1917)
  - Sonata for Cello and Piano No. 1, Op. 11, No. 3 (1919)
  - Sonata for Cello and Piano No. 2 (1948)
  - Kleine Sonate for Cello and Piano (1942)
  - Solo Sonata for Cello, Op. 25, No. 3 (1923)
  - Drei leichte Stücke for Cello and Piano (1938)
- Sonata for Double Bass and piano Sonata (1949)
- Pieces (unaccompanied double bass) (1929)
- Flute
  - Canonic sonatina for two Flutes, Op. 31, No. 3 (1923)
  - Eight Pieces for Solo Flute (1927)
  - Sonata for Flute and Piano (1936)
- Sonata for Oboe and Piano (1938)
- Sonata for English Horn and Piano (1941)
- Sonata for Clarinet and Piano (1939)
- Sonata for Bassoon and Piano (1938)
- Horn
  - Sonata for French Horn and Piano (1939)
  - Sonata for Four Horns (1952)
- Alto Horn Sonata (also for Horn or Alto Saxophone) (1943)
- Sonata for Trumpet and Piano (1939)
- Sonata for Trombone and Piano (1941)
- Sonata for Tuba and Piano (1955)
- Sonata for Harp (1939)

== Solo piano ==
Source.

- Eight Waltzes ("Drei wunderschöne Mädchen im Schwarzwald"), for piano 4 hands, Op. 6 (1916)
- In einer Nacht..., Op. 15 (1917–1919)
- Sonate, Op. 17 (1920)
- Tanzstücke, Op. 19 (1920)
- Suite "1922", Op. 26 (1922)
- Übung in drei Stücken, Op. 37, Part 1 (1924-25)
- Reihe Kleine Stücke, Op. 37, Part 2 (1926)
- Kleine Klaviermusik (1929)
- Wir bauen eine Stadt (1931)
- Piano Sonata No. 1 (1936)
- Piano Sonata No. 2 (1936)
- Piano Sonata No. 3 (1936)
- Variations (1936)
- Piano Sonata (four hands) (1938)
- Sonata for Two Pianos (four hands) (1942)
- Ludus Tonalis (1942)

== Solo organ ==
- Two Pieces for Organ (1918)
- Organ Sonata No. 1 (1937)
- Organ Sonata No. 2 (1937)
- Organ Sonata No. 3 (on ancient folk songs) (1940)

== Other ==
- Soundtrack for Hans Richter's 1928 avant-garde film Ghosts Before Breakfast (Vormittagsspuk), subsequently lost.
