= Ouvertüre zum "Fliegenden Holländer", wie sie eine schlechte Kurkapelle morgens um 7 am Brunnen vom Blatt spielt =

Composition by Paul Hindemith

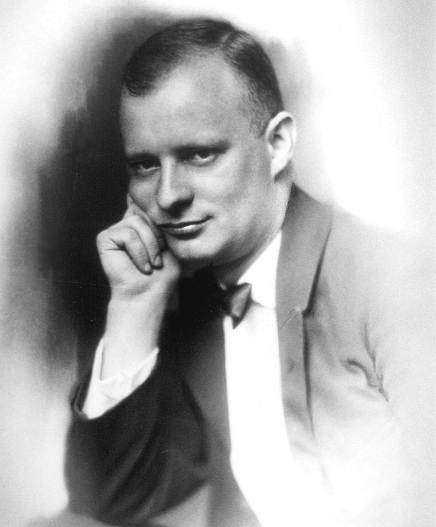
Paul Hindemith in 1923

Ouvertüre zum „Fliegenden Holländer“, wie sie eine schlechte Kurkapelle morgens um 7 am Brunnen vom Blatt spielt (Overture to the Flying Dutchman as Sight-read by a Bad Spa Orchestra at 7 in the Morning by the Well) is a musical parody for string quartet by Paul Hindemith, based on the overture to The Flying Dutchman by Richard Wagner. The piece dates to c. 1925 and in performance lasts approximately eight minutes.

== Background ==
In his youth, Hindemith supplemented the family income by performing at dances, inns, and in cinema, operetta, and spa orchestras. Later, his sense of humour occasioned numerous parody pieces, dramatic, instrumental, and vocal. These include a Gouda-Emmental March (Gouda-Emmental Marsch; 1920; lost); The atonal cabaret (Das atonale cabaret; 1921; lost); Song in the style of Richard Strauss (Lied 'im Stile Richard Strauss'; c. 1925), with text from the journal "Bees and how to keep them"; and The Expiring Frog (Recitative e aria ranatica; 1944), inspired by Encyclopædia Britannica and Charles Dickens. In 1920 he wrote to Schott, his publisher, "Can you make use of foxtrot, Boston, rags and other kitsch? When I can think of no decent music, I write such things." (Note: Können Sie auch Foxtrotts, Bostons, Rags und anderen Kitsch gebrauchen? Wenn mir keine anständige Musik mehr einfällt, schreibe ich immer solche Sachen.) His failure to arrange publication explains the loss of many of these works.

== Music ==
As might be expected from the title, the composition sees Wagner's overture mangled. Yet all the errors, the playing out of tune, rhythmic imprecision, and interpretative deficiencies to which such an ensemble upon such an occasion might be prone are "written out meticulously", demanding great technical proficiency in execution, even if the end result is "pitiful". From bar 261 the piece dissolves into a waltz (part of Les Patineurs by Waldteufel), before returning to Wagner and closing with a shimmering finale. It is not clear whether Hindemith is satirizing Wagner, incompetent performers, "ostentatiously dissonant composers", or the introduction of popular elements into serious music. Regardless, according to the American music scholar Daniel Albright, of all the reworkings of The Flying Dutchman in twentieth-century music, this is "the most explicitly amusing".

== Recordings ==
Recordings include those by the Buchberger Quartett (WER 6197-2); Kocian Quartet (PR 250 093 94); Leipziger Streichquartett (MDG 307 1362-2); and the Solistes de l'Opéra National de Paris (UT3-005). The score and parts are published by Schott (ISMN: 979-0-001-08328-7).

== See also ==
- List of compositions by Paul Hindemith
- Entartete Musik
- Humour
