= Concert music =

Concert music may refer to

- Brass band, music performed by brass ensembles
- Classical music, the art music produced in, or rooted in, the traditions of Western liturgical and secular music, encompassing a broad period from roughly the 9th century to present times
  - Orchestral music, as distinct from chamber music
- Concert band, music performed by wind ensembles
- Light music, 20th Century light orchestral music

== See also ==
- Konzertmusik for Brass and String Orchestra, a composition by Paul Hindemith
