= Willard MacGregor =

American painter

Willard MacGregor (October 15, 1901, in Boston – July 30, 1993, in New York City) was an American classical pianist.

He studied piano in St. Louis with Rudolph Ganz and Leo C. Miller, then in Paris with Isidor Philipp and Nadia Boulanger and finally in Berlin with Artur Schnabel. At the same time he concertized in Paris, Berlin, London, Lausanne and other European cities. On the other hand, in 1931 and 1932 MacGregor studied painting in Wien with Franz Lerch. Back to the USA in 1930s, he played extensively in Kraeuter trio (with Phyllis Kraeuter and Karl Kraeuter), then started solo career. MacGregor is best known as the first performer of Paul Hindemith's Ludus tonalis (1943, Chicago), he also played Hindemith's Sonata for Piano Four Hands together with the author. In 1944 during Igor Stravinsky's American tour MacGregor played his Concerto for Two Pianos together with the composer. His records of 1950s include different pieces by Beethoven, Franz Schubert and Debussy.

MacGregor's painting has been exhibited in New York City, Chicago, Newark and other cities throughout the USA. The Virgin Islands Daily News pointed out that "MacGregor shows the same vigor, warmth and professional technique in his music as he does in his painting".
