= Duet (Hindemith) =

- Scherzo
- by Paul Hindemith
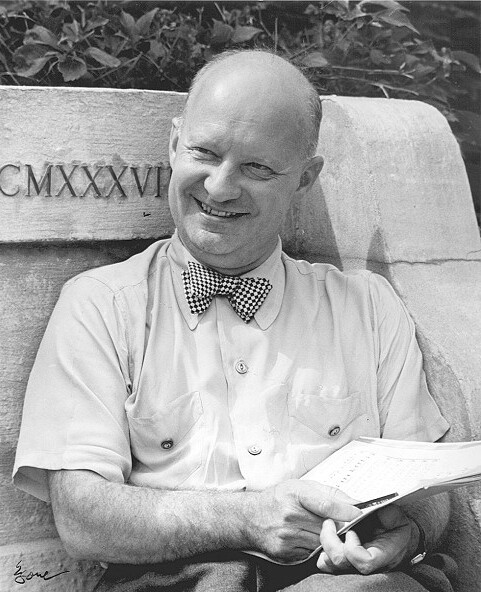
- Hindemith during the 1940s
- Year: 1934
- Occasion: Recording session of Sonata for Solo Viola No. 2
- Published: 1957 — Mainz
- Publisher: B. Schott Söhne
- Recorded: January 23, 1934 — London
- Duration: 3:20 minutes
- Movements: 1
- Scoring: Viola and cello

The Duet for Viola and Cello, initially and alternatively entitled Scherzo, is a short duet by German composer Paul Hindemith. It was written and first recorded in 1934, and its origins are closely connected to the composer's Sonata for Solo Viola No. 2.

== Background ==
This duet was composed because Hindemith needed to fill the final side of a short 78-rpm disc while recording his Sonata for Solo Viola No. 2 (1922). The five-movement sonata occupied five sides of a three-disc set, leaving about four to five minutes unused. To complete the set, Hindemith hastily wrote an additional piece between 5:00 a.m. and 8:20 a.m., which he then recorded later that same day. Both the sonata and the duet were performed and recorded on January 23, 1934, in Abbey Road Studio No. 3, in London. The piece was recorded for Columbia Records' German branch. The piece was released in Germany under the title "Scherzo", as the B-side of the disc under the catalog number LW 12, within a set of three 78-rpm discs. In the United States, the recording was sold separately, and the sonata was released with a blank B-side. Both the composer himself at the viola and cellist Emanuel Feuermann premiered the duet. It was published under the title "Duet" by B. Schott's Söhne in 1957.

== Structure ==
The duet is scored for viola and cello. The recording made by Hindemith has a total approximate duration of 3 minutes and 20 seconds. It consists of six pages of music where no time or key signatures are provided. Since it loosely follows the character and structure of a scherzo, it is very quickly paced, marked "Schnelle Achtel" in the score, and features sixteenth notes prominently.
