= Les Patineurs (waltz) =

Waltz by Émile Waldteufel

"Les Patineurs"
Barrel organ playing

Les Patineurs ("The Ice Skaters", in German "Der Schlittschuhläufer-Walzer"), Op. 183, is a waltz by Émile Waldteufel.

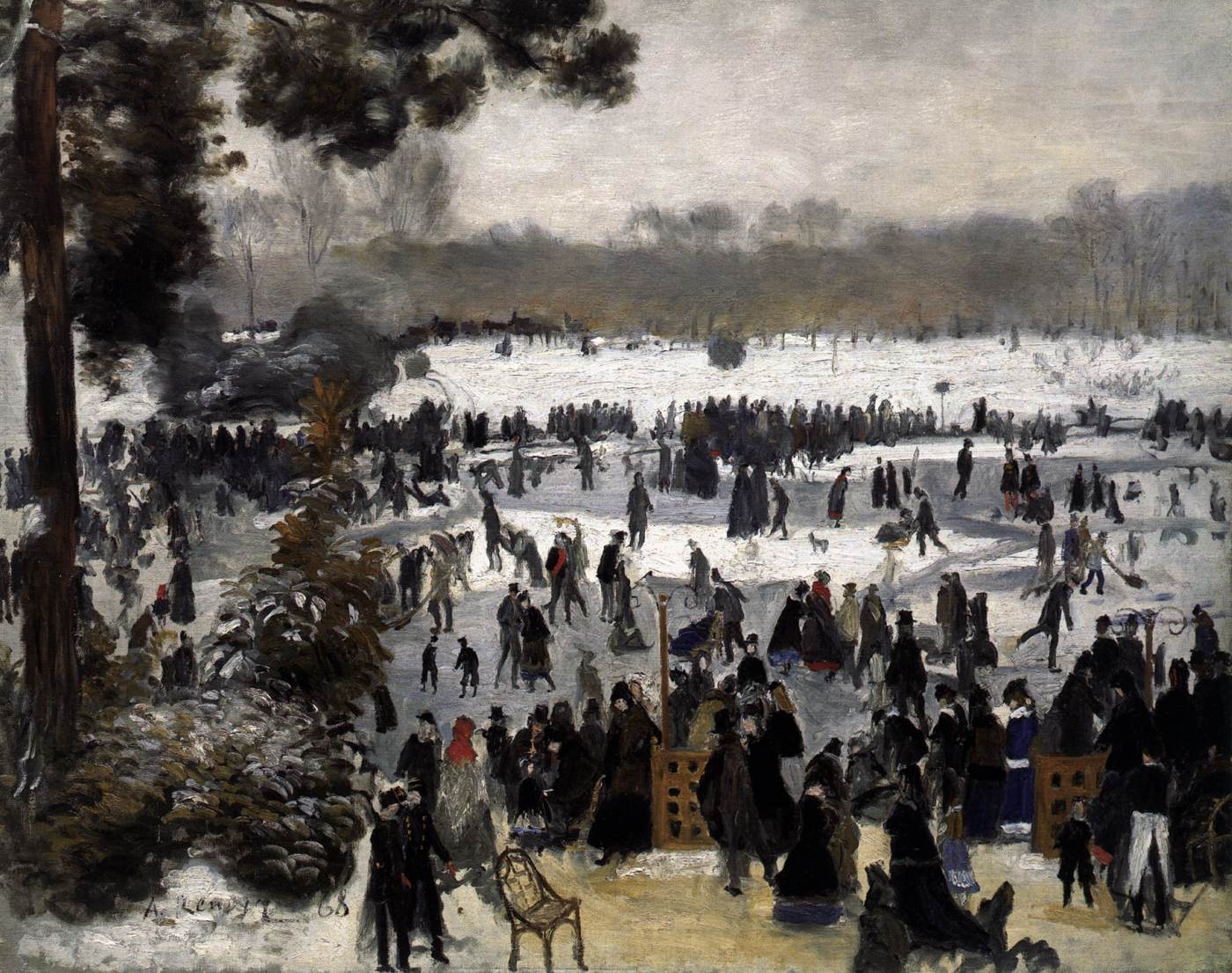
Rink of Skaters at the Bois de Boulogne (painted by Renoir, 1868)

It was composed in 1882, inspired by the cercle des patineurs (rink of skaters) at the Bois de Boulogne in Paris. The introduction to the waltz can be likened to the poise of a skater, and the rapid runs invoke scenes of a wintry atmosphere. Bells were added for good measure to complete the winter scenery.

It was published by Hopwood & Crew and was dedicated to Ernest Coquelin, the younger brother of two celebrated actor brothers of the Comédie-Française.

== Structure ==
Introduction

Waltz 1

Waltz 2

Waltz 3

Waltz 4

Coda

== Use in other media ==
"Les Patineurs" has featured in dozens of films, from the earliest talkies to the present, including The Hollywood Revue of 1929, My Favorite Wife, Chariots of Fire, A Simple Wish, My Beautiful Laundrette, and Wife vs. Secretary. It was also played at Rose's "coming-out" ball in London in the last episode of season 4 of the TV show Downton Abbey, as well as in the episode "Secret Shopper" of the kids' TV show Fanboy & Chum Chum. It was used in the original version of the children's television series Pingu in the third episode, "The New Arrival". It is also on the compilation Andy Williams Christmas Show DVD in a scene from his 1967 Christmas show on television. A music-box version is used in the Japanese film Himizu, the piece is hummed by Rabbit (voiced by Junius Matthews) while he is skating in Winnie the Pooh and Tigger Too. In the 2019 Elton John biopic Rocketman, a young Reggie plays along on the piano as the waltz plays on the wireless, sparking the recognition of his musical talent.

The music is played in every level of the NES game Antarctic Adventure.

A small part of it is played in the TV series Daredevil and its spin-off The Punisher.

"The Skaters' Waltz" is also a music record in Nintendogs + Cats.

This piece was remixed in Nintendo's 2005 video game Dance Dance Revolution Mario Mix, as a song called "Rendezvous on Ice" that plays when Mario is skating away from an avalanche down a mountain.

This piece was shortened in Sega's 2009 Wii video game Mario & Sonic at the Olympic Winter Games.

"The Skaters' Waltz" is used in the 1985 BBC children's television show Galloping Galaxies!.

"The Skaters' Waltz" is used, briefly, towards the end of Paul Hindemith's 1925 parody Ouvertüre zum "Fliegenden Holländer", wie sie eine schlechte Kurkapelle morgens um 7 am Brunnen vom Blatt spielt, a very dissonant spoof of Wagner's overture to Der fliegende Holländer. Waldteufel's music suddenly appears, perfectly consonant, as the players "forget" what they were playing and then they "remember" what they were supposed to be playing and return to the dissonant spoof on Wagner.
