= Grete Stückgold =

German-American opera soprano (1895–1977)

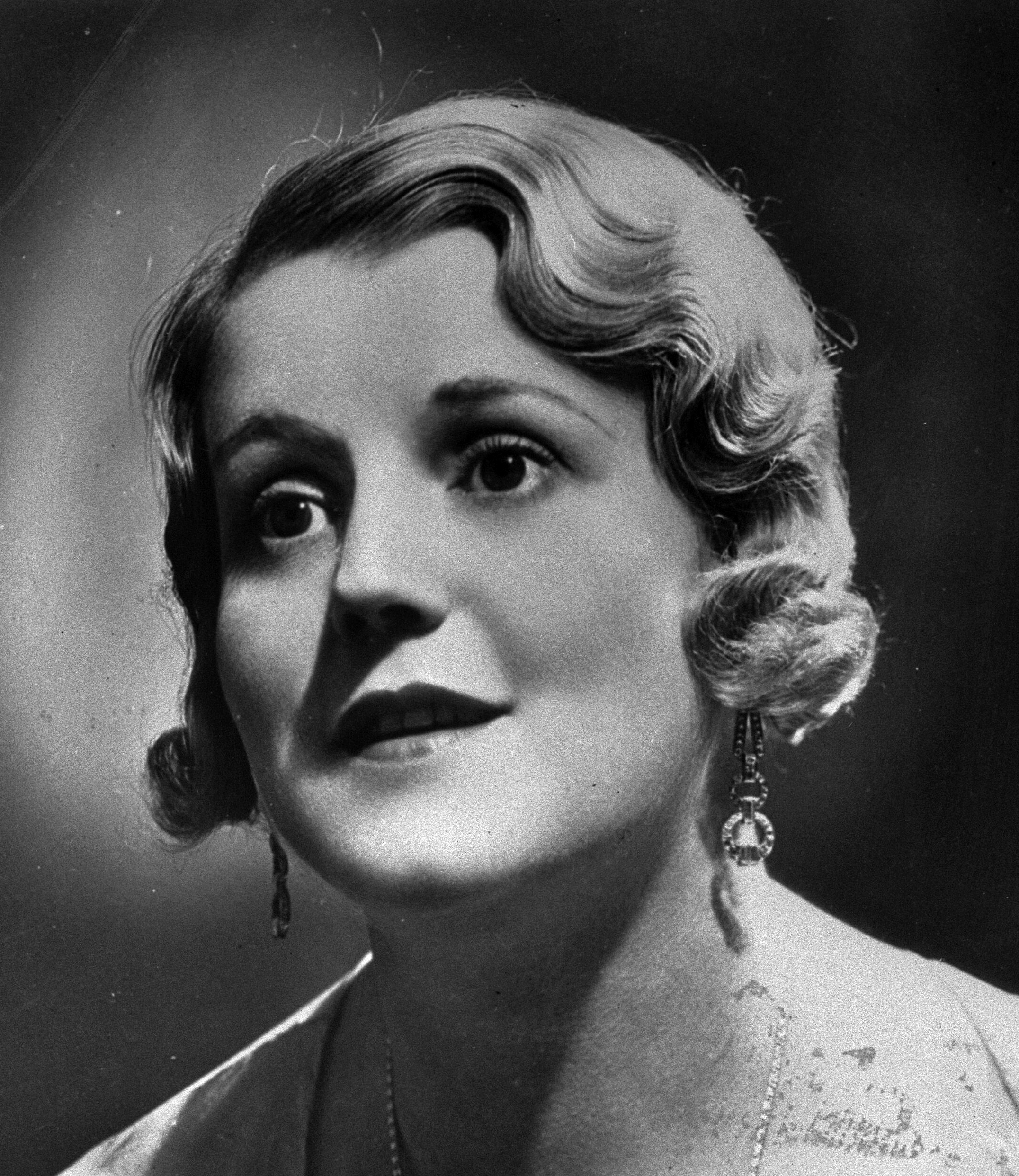
Grete Stückgold, 1936

Grete Stückgold (6 July 1895 – 15 September 1977) was an English-born German and American operatic soprano.

== Life and career ==
Born in London, Stückgold was the daughter of Ludwig Schneidt, a German who worked in Nordenham, England. Her mother was English, and she was a citizen of both England and Germany. She attended schools in Nordenham and London before moving to Germany in 1913. She trained as a soprano with voice teacher Jacques Stückgold (1877–1953) whom she later married. She had a daughter with Jacques before their marriage ended in 1929. Her second marriage was to the baritone Gustav Schützendorf.

Stückgold began her professional career in the mid-1910s as a concert and oratorio soprano. She made her professional opera debut at the Staatstheater Nürnberg in 1917. In 1922 she became a resident artist at the Berlin State Opera. In 1926 she gave a recital tour of the United Kingdom, and in 1927 she made her debut at the Royal Opera House, Covent Garden, in the title role of Giuseppe Verdi's Aida. She made several appearances at the Semperoper from 1926 through 1929 during which time she also appeared in multiple concerts with the Leipzig Gewandhaus Orchestra conducted by Arthur Nikisch. She also performed as a guest artist in Barcelona at the Liceu in 1927. In 1929 she created the lead role of Laura in the premiere of Paul Hindemith's opera Neues vom Tage at the Kroll Opera House.

In 1927 Stückgold became a principal artist the Metropolitan Opera ("the Met") in New York City, and not long after became a naturalized American citizen. She made her debut at the Met on 2 November 1927 in the role of Eva in Die Meistersinger von Nürnberg. She performed in eight seasons at the Met between the years 1927 and 1939; only being absent from the Met stage in the years 1935 and 1936 during that period. Some of the roles she performed at the Met included Aida, Agathe in Der Freischütz, Elisabeth in Tannhäuser, Sieglinde in Die Walküre, and the Marschallin in Der Rosenkavalier.

Stückgold died on 15 September 1977, in Falls Village, Connecticut.
