= Fritz Zohsel =

German gymnast and operatic tenor (1879–1952)

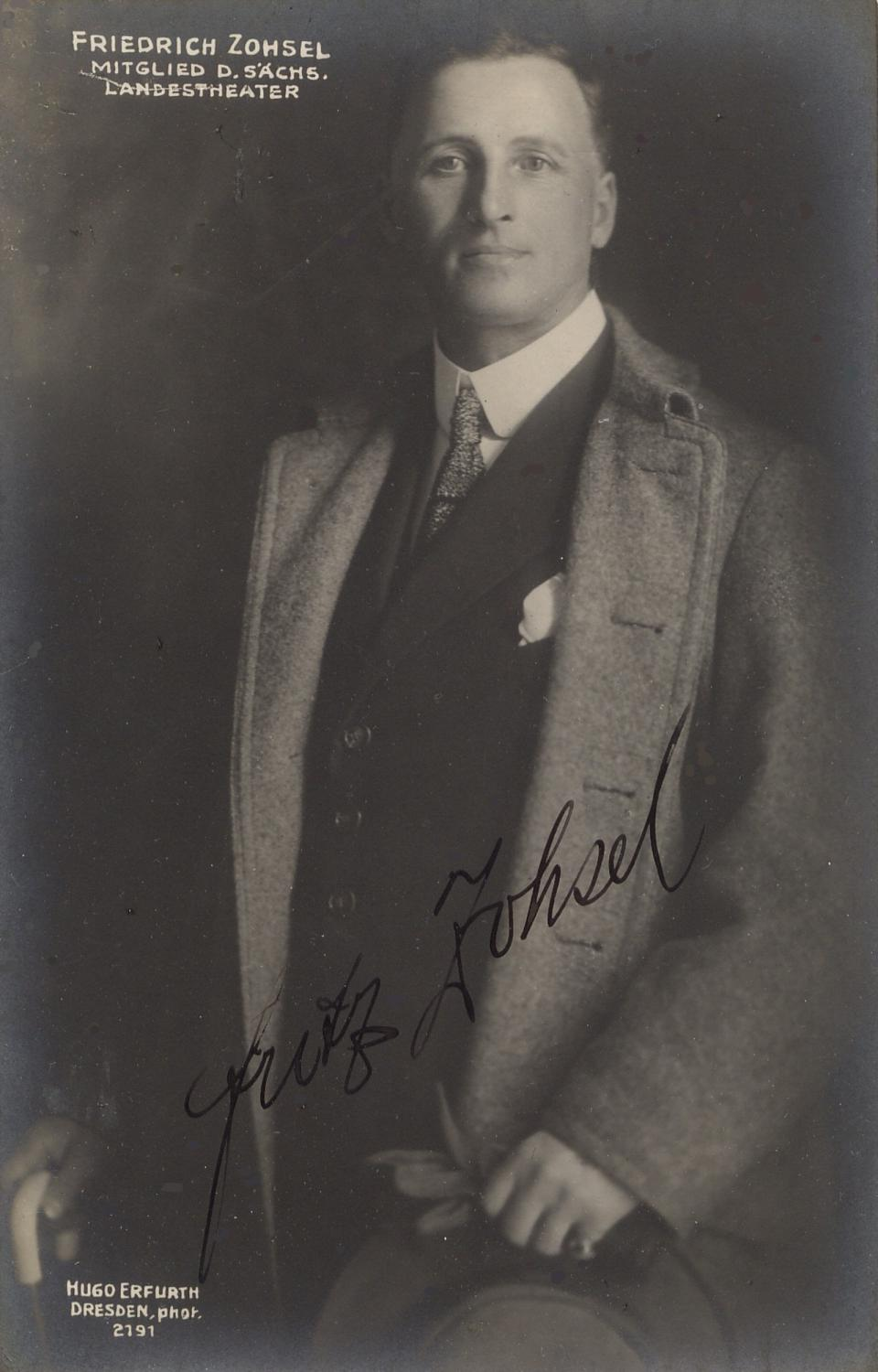
Fritz Zohsel (ca. 1910). Picture by Hugo Erfurth

Friedrich Fritz Zohsel (24 January 1879 – 12 March 1952) was a German gymnast and operatic tenor.

== Life ==
Zohsel was born in Stuttgart in 1879, where his father Joseph Zohsel worked as a "case and Galanteriewaren maker and his mother Marie Zohsel then worked as a language teacher from 1889. The Zohsel family is last recorded in the Stuttgart address book from 1893. In 1900, his mother appears for the first time with an entry as a language teacher in the address book of Munich.

In Munich Zohsel was a member of the MTV München 1879. In 1903 he became the winner of the Deutsches Turnfest at the Deutsches Turnfest in Nuremberg as the winner of the Deutscher Zwölfkampf gymnastics festival.

Zohsel started his career as an accountant at Münchner Trambahn-Aktiengesellschaft (MTAG). In 1905, he was registered with his mother at Fraunhoferstraße 12. During this time, he did his vocal training with Jacques Stückgold, afterwards he continued his studies with Heinrich Knote.

From 1908 to 1911, Zohsel could be found as opera singer in the Munich address books.

He made his debut in 1908 at the Detmold court theatre, then he was engaged in Ulm and then in Basel, 1911/12 in Katowice and 1912/13 in Görlitz. From there, he went to Berlin. When World War I broke out in 1914, he had to go to the front as a soldier and was captured by the Russians, from where he could only return to Germany in 1919. In the 1920s, he signed long-term contracts at opera houses and municipal theatres in Dresden, Chemnitz and Leipzig: He was engaged at the Dresden State Opera from 1919 to 1922, then he changed to the Chemnitz City Theatre and from 1927 to 1930 he had an engagement in Leipzig. After that, followed a period of guest performances, interrupted by engagements in Dortmund 1933/34 and Augsburg 1934/35. From the time in Dresden dates a photo portrait of the singer by Hugo Erfurth.

Zohsel was a chamber singer at the Staatsoper Berlin for 30 years until 1937, before he was active as a stage agent until 1945. Due to the Second World War, he lost all his possessions in Silesia. He died in Berlin in 1952 at the age of 73 as a result of an embolism.

During his time in Chemnitz he could be seen in 1925 in Hassan der Schwärmer by Wilhelm Kienzl. In 1928 he appeared in Hermann Hans Wetzler's Die baskische Venus in Leipzig.
