= Jukka Tiensuu =

Finnish classical musician

Jukka Santeri Tiensuu (born 30 August 1948) is a Finnish contemporary classical composer, harpsichordist, pianist and conductor.

== Career ==
Tiensuu was born in Helsinki. After extensive musical studies (piano, harpsichord, conducting, composing, historically informed performance, electroacoustic and computer music a.o.t.) at the Sibelius Academy, Helsinki (1967–1972), the Juilliard School, New York (1972–1973), Hochschule für Musik Freiburg (1974–1976), IRCAM, Paris (1978–1982) and other institutes Jukka Tiensuu toured three continents giving numerous concerts with a wide repertoire ranging from the Renaissance to the latest avant-garde and performing both classical and free improvisations. He has received numerous prizes for his compositional work as well as for his recordings and performances. In 2020, he won the Wihuri Sibelius Prize. According to the jury report his "compositions emanate a deep spirituality, and his unwavering adherence to artistic goals is impressive".

Along with over a hundred works in the traditional instrumental, vocal and orchestral fields – in various styles, often microtonal and with electronic or computer music parts – Tiensuu's compositional output also includes many curiosities such as works for Chinese orchestra, accordion ensemble, clarinet choir, instrumental theatre, Baroque orchestra, jazz orchestra, kantele, sheng and works for any ensemble. Most of his works have remained in the repertoire and are available on disc.

His compositions have been premiered by major orchestras and ensembles in three continents by conductors such as Susanna Mälkki, Ernest Bour, Sakari Oramo, Jukka-Pekka Saraste, Lorraine Vaillancourt, Diego Masson, Ilan Volkov, Leif Segerstam, Jacek Kaspszyk, John Storgårds, Hannu Lintu, Dima Slobodeniuk, Yan Huichang, Juha Kangas, Jacques Mercier, Stefan Asbury, among others.

In the late 70's, as the president of the ISCM Finnish Section, Tiensuu started the first ever regular contemporary music concert series in Helsinki. He then became a founder and the first artistic director of Helsinki Biennale (now Musica nova Helsinki) as well as the founder and a long-time artistic director of Time of Music contemporary music festival and summer academy in Viitasaari. His other activities include teaching, writing for books and magazines and making evocative radio programs on both baroque music and on music of our time. According to Finnish Music Quarterly (3/2007) Jukka Tiensuu's influence on the contemporary Finnish music scene is virtually beyond compare.

== Awards (selection) ==
- 1973 Koussevitzky Award
- 1978 Léonie Sonning Talent Prize
- 1979 Gaudeamus International Interpreters Award, 2nd prize (as pianist)
- 1987 Record of the Year "The Fantastic Harpsichord" (Finlandia FACD 357)
- 1988 International Rostrum of Composers Winner/Selected work (Tokko)
- 1996 Erik Bergman Prize
- 1999 Janne Award (Best solo album) for "The Frivolous Harpsichord"
- 2003 First prize for oddjob (given by the audience) at Hultgren Solo Cello Works Biennial
- 2004 First prize for Lots in the Aliénor Awards composition competition
- 2004 Teosto Prize for the most original and innovative work in 2004 (Umori)
- 2006 Emma Award (Best Classical Album) for "Minds and Moods" (Alba Records ABCD 224)
- 2008 Emma Award (Best Classical Album) for "Gamba nova" (Musica ambigua on Alba Records ABCD 259)
- 2008 Record of the year for "nemo, Puro, Spiriti" (Alba Records ABCD 258)
- 2008 Pizzicato magazine "Supersonic Award" and Süddeutsche Zeitung "Best Record" (Erz on Hänssler Classic)
- 2010 Emma Award (Best Classical Album) "Tiensuu Plus" (Alba Records ABCD 287)
- 2012 Finnish State Prize
- 2015 Record of the year (Rack on Alba Records ABCD 383)
- 2015 Pro Musica award
- 2019 Coup de cœur des Jeunes Mélomanes (Fondation Prince Pierre de Monaco) for Teoton
- 2020 Wihuri Sibelius Prize

== Discography ==
- Compositions and performances.

== Works (selection) ==
Tiensuu's works are available from his home page www.tiensuu.fi (downloadable) and Musicfinland.fi (printed sheet music)

- 1972 Cadenza (on one note) for flute
- 1972 Ouverture for flute and harpsichord
- 1974 Four Etudes for flute
- 1974 preLUDI, LUDI and postLUDI for guitar
- 1975 Aspro for clarinet, trombone, cello and piano
- 1975 Rubato for any ensemble of melody instruments
- 1976 Prélude non-mesuré for piano
- 1977 Sinistro for accordion and guitar
- 1977 Mxpzkl for orchestra
- 1978–79 Yang for two ensembles
- 1979 Narcissus for oboe and tape
- 1980 Tombeau de Beethoven for oboe or clarinet, cello, piano, and sampler or tape
- 1980 Passage for soprano voice, ensemble and live-electronics
- 1980 M concerto for microtonally tuned harpsichord, percussion and string orchestra
- 1981 /L for piano 4-hands and optional live-electronics
- 1982 P=Pinocchio? for soprano voice, ensemble and computer
- 1984 Fantango for any keyboard instrument
- 1985 Tango lunaire for oboe or flute, clarinet, violin, cello and any keyboard instrument
- 1985 mutta for three accordions
- 1987 Tokko for male choir and tape
- 1988 Manaus for kantele
- 1989 Puro concerto for clarinet and orchestra
- 1990 Grround for piano
- 1990 Tombeau de Mozart for clarinet, violin and piano
- 1990 Arsenic and Old Lace for microtonally tuned harpsichord and string quartet
- 1993 Sound of Life radiophonic piece
- 1993 Halo a symphony for orchestra in three parts
- 1994 Plus V concerto for accordion and string orchestra
- 1994 Ai for 6-track tape
- 1995 Vento for clarinet choir
- 1995 oddjob for violin or viola or cello and live electronics
- 1995–98 Alma: I Himo, II Lumo, III Soma for orchestra and sampler
- 1996 Aion for two accordions
- 1996 Fra Tango for three accordions
- 1997 Padrigal for male choir
- 1997 nemo for ensemble and electronics
- 1997 Beat for clarinet, cello and piano
- 1998 Drang for guitar
- 1998 Musica ambigua for baroque ensemble (recorder, violin, viol, harpsichord)
- 1999 Asteletsa for walking bassoonist or bass clarinetist
- 1999 Mood stereophonic music for orchestra
- 2000 Ember concertino for microtonal flute and ensemble
- 2000 Koi for orchestra
- 2000 Etudes: 1. train 2. drain 3, grain for harpsichord
- 2000 Mind concerto for piano and orchestra
- 2001 Tri for three pianos
- 2002 Zolo for accordion
- 2003 Lots for baroque ensemble (recorder or traverso flute, violin, viol or cello, harpsichord)
- 2004 Umori for jazz orchestra (Big band)
- 2005 Spiriti concerto for accordion and orchestra
- 2005 Aim concerto for guitar and orchestra
- 2005 Balzo for cello
- 2006 Ote for cello and contrabass
- 2006 Tanzikone for recorder, trombone and cello
- 2007 Erz 14 companion pieces for J. S. Bach's Goldberg Variations (for accordion)
- 2007 Missa concerto for clarinet and orchestra
- 2007 Vie concerto for orchestra
- 2007 Hei for four melody instruments (tribute to Paavo Heininen)
- 2008 False Memories I-III Morphoses for orchestra
- 2008 Sun Games for orchestra (tribute to Magnus Lindberg)
- 2008 Doch – Apotheose von Papa Haydn for string quartet
- 2008 Ikisyyt for ensemble
- 2008 Rack for string quartet
- 2009 Blow/Blau fanfares for three wind instrument trios
- 2010 Nous for clarinet, violin, viola, cello and piano
- 2010 bLeuelein for cello (tribute to Anssi Karttunen)
- 2011 Bleu-El for contrabass
- 2011 Sulci for string orchestra
- 2011 Egregore microtonal music for kantele, guitar, accordion and piano
- 2011 Brandi a 2nd movement for J. S. Bach's 3rd Brandenburg concerto
- 2011 Kvagmaa for two string quartets tuned a quarter-tone apart
- 2012 Voice Verser for soprano voice and orchestra
- 2012 Hou concerto for violin and ensemble
- 2012 Mora for tenor voice and baroque or small orchestra
- 2012 Armotta for viola, guitar and cello
- 2012 Kalaasi a theatrical piece for flute, clarinet, trombone and contrabass (tribute to Kaija Saariaho)
- 2013 Egeiro for piano left hand
- 2014 Hehkuu stereophonic music for sheng and ensemble
- 2014 Oire concerto for cello and orchestra
- 2015 Anomal Dances concerto for quarter-tone accordion and orchestra
- 2015 Ihmix for Chinese orchestra
- 2015 Kuuhiomo for any ensemble of melody instruments
- 2015 Teoton concerto for sheng and orchestra
- 2016 Tarinaoopperabaletti concerto for electric cello and ensemble
- 2016 Daydreams for guitar and electronics
- 2017 Sinfoniaviis for orchestra
- 2017 Suuna concerto for trombone and orchestra
- 2017 Appo concerto for recorder and orchestra
- 2017 Innuo for baroque orchestra
- 2018 Collateral three solos as string trio
- 2018 Tuleks a fanfare for ensemble
