= Tuttifäntchen =

Play with music by Paul Hindemith

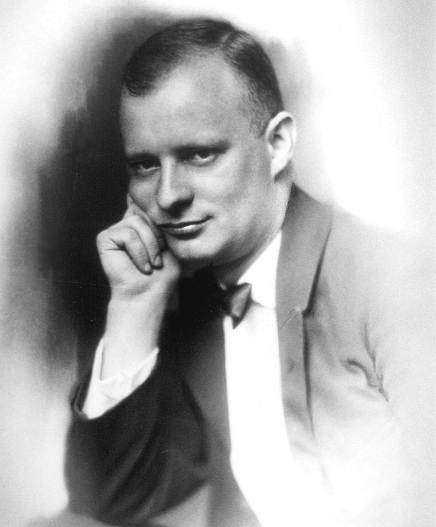
Paul Hindemith in 1923

Tuttifäntchen is a 1922 German musical play, a Christmas fairy tale for children with music by Paul Hindemith. The play itself is subtitled, Weihnachtsmärchen mit Gesang und Tanz in drei Bildern von Hedwig Michel und Franziska Becker.

== Plot ==
The woodcarver Tuttifant is carving a Kaspar (or Punch) puppet when it comes to life. Because Tuttifäntchen has no heart he takes the heart of Tuttifant's daughter Trudel, who while Tuttifäntchen lives continues to live. However, when the puppet falls upon the fir tree from which he was taken and is absorbed back into the tree, Trudel begins to die. Tuttifant's apprentice retrieves Trudel's heart and returns it to her, saving her life. The star of Trudel's dead mother appears above the fir tree. Otto Erhardt recounts that Hindemith started work on the music without having read the full libretto.

== Recordings ==
A recording by soloists, the Berlin Radio Choir and Deutsches SO Berlin under Johannes Zurl was released by CPO in 2013.

A recording of a suite drawn from the full score by the Queensland Symphony Orchestra conducted by Werner Andreas Albert, was released by CPO as well.

"Orquestra Clássica da Madeira", conducted by Roberto Alejandro Pérez, ALMASUD, 1999.

An Italian translation and adaptation was made by the musicologist Quirino Principe in 2008. The narration with the 11 numbers of the "Suite" is recorded on CD Discantica 176 ("La Bottega Discantica", Milan). Symphony Orchestra of Milan "Giuseppe Verdi", conductor Fabrizio Dorsi, narrator Quirino Principe.
