= Symphonia Serena =

Symphony by Paul Hindemith

Symphonia Serena is an orchestral work composed by Paul Hindemith in 1946. It was premiered by the Dallas Symphony Orchestra on 2 February 1947 with Antal Dorati conducting. The work is organized into four movements:

1. Moderately fast
2. Geschwindmarsch by Beethoven, paraphrase
3. Colloquy
4. Finale
