= Heinrich Bötel =

German tenor

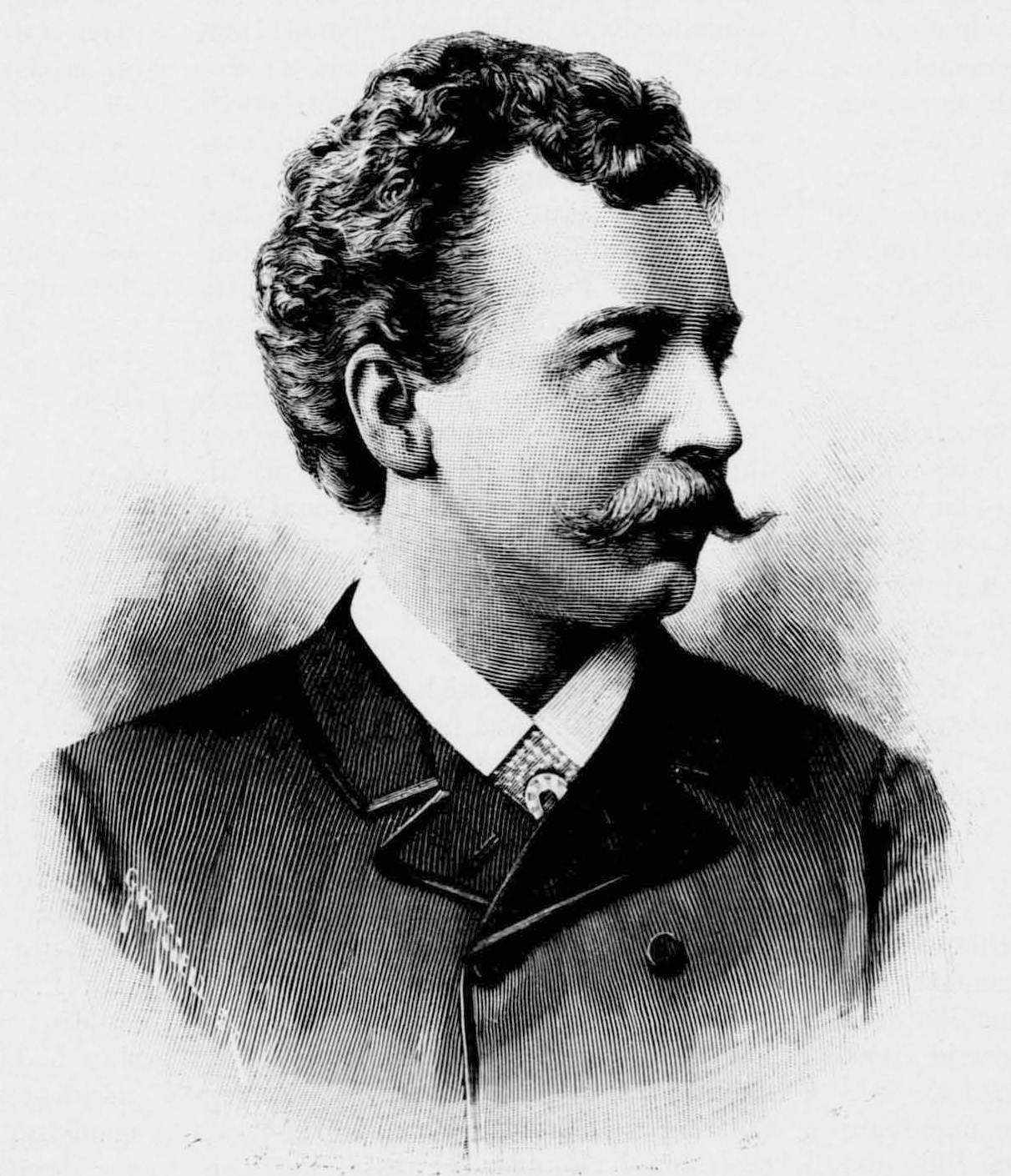
Heinrich Bötel. Xylography in the Svensk musiktidning 1890

Heinrich Friedrich Bötel (6 March 1854 – 5 January 1938) was a German operatic tenor.

== Life ==
Born in Hamburg, Bötel worked in his father's carriage business from the age of 14 to 18. After he had fulfilled his military duty with a hussar regiment, he resumed his civil existence as a coachman in 1876.

His beautiful voice has often been noticed among good friends, but it was not given any further attention. Then Hofrat Bernhard Pollini, director of the Hamburg Stadttheater, heard him and let him audition. At the beginning, when the news spread through Germany that another tenor had been discovered on the Kutschbocke, they did not want to trust this news, they did not believe in a second Theodor Wachtel.

Bötel, who was trained by the composer Hermann Zumpe and the singer Franz Krückl, made his debut as "Manrico" at the Hamburg Stadttheater in 1883.

Whether in Vienna or Berlin, whether in Cologne, Breslau or Stuttgart, wherever he appeared on guest appearances, Bötel's rare voice was always given unreserved recognition.

Ludwig Speidel said occasionally during a guest performance in Vienna: "It is like a bird that only becomes quite comfortable at high altitudes."

In 1900 he left the association of the municipal theater and was still active as a singer until 1911. He died in Hamburg at the age of 83 and was buried in the Ohlsdorf Cemetery, but the grave does not exist anymore. The gravestone can be found today on the family grave in the St.-Marien- und St.-Nikolai-Friedhof I in the Prenzlauer Berg district.

His son Bernhard Bötel (1883-1953) also became an opera singer.
