= Neues vom Tage =

Opera by Paul Hindemith

- Lustige Oper by Paul Hindemith
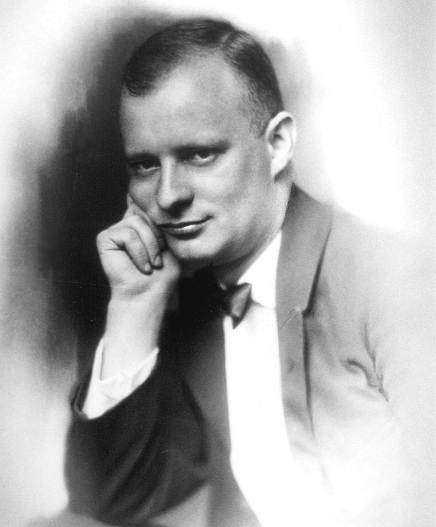
- The composer in 1923
- Translation: News of the Day
- Librettist: Marcellus Schiffer
- Language: German
- Premiere: 8 June 1929; Kroll Opera House, Berlin

Neues vom Tage (English: News of the Day) is a comic opera (Lustige Oper) in three parts by Paul Hindemith, with a German libretto by Marcellus Schiffer.

The opera is a satire of modern life, celebrity and marriage, involving parodies of both Puccini's music and Berlin Kabarett. The opera became notorious for a scene with a naked soprano (Laura) singing in the bath about the wonders of modern plumbing, though Hindemith replaced her with the tenor (Hermann) in the revised version.

The on-stage nudity particularly aroused the ire of Ernst "Putzi" Hanfstängel, Hitler’s musical advisor, and was later indirectly cited by Joseph Goebbels as evidence that the "degenerate art" of "cultural bolshevist" composers should be excluded from Germany.

== Performance history ==
Neues vom Tage was first performed on 8 June 1929, at the Kroll Opera House, Berlin, under the musical direction of Otto Klemperer. Hindemith revised the opera, changing the text and adding a little new music, for the Teatro San Carlo, Naples, on 7 April 1954. The premiere of the work in the United States was at the Santa Fe Opera in 1961.

== Roles ==
Roles, voice types, premiere casts of original and revised versions
Role	Voice type	Premiere cast, 8 June 1929 (Conductor: Otto Klemperer)	Revised version, 7 April 1954 (Conductor: Paul Hindemith)
Laura	soprano	Grete Stückgold	Mercedes Fortunati
Eduard, Laura's husband	baritone	Fritz Krenn	Giuseppe Valdengo
Hermann, a professional co-respondent	tenor	Erik Wirl	Gino Sinimberghi
Herr M.	tenor	Artur Cavara	Alessandro Pellegrini
Frau M.	mezzo-soprano	Sabine Kalter	Adamo
Baron d'Houdoux, an entrepreneur	bass	not in this version	Giuseppe Modesti
Frau Pick, a newspaper reporter	contralto	not in this version	Myriam Pirazzini
Uli	bass	not in this version	Coriolano Jorio
Hotel director	bass	Dezső Ernster	Gerardo Gaudiosi
Room maid	soprano	Dolly Lorenz	
Guide	bass	Otto Freund	Plinio Clabassi
Head waiter	tenor	Alfred Bartolitius	
Registrar	bass	Heinrich Schultz	Giovanni Amodeo
First manager	tenor	Bernhard Bötel	Nino Adami
Second manager	tenor	Albert Peters	Silvio Santarelli
Third manager	tenor	Iso Golland	Gianni Avolanti
Fourth manager	tenor	Walter Beck	Piero De Palma
Fifth manager	bass	Oscar Kalman	Aldo Terrosi
Sixth manager	bass	Denzsö Ernster	

== Recordings ==
Hindemith: Neues vom Tage – WDR Rundfunkorchester Köln

- Conductor: Jan Latham-Koenig
- Principal singers: Elisabeth Werres (Laura), Claudio Nicolai, (Eduard), Ronald Pries (Hermann) / Horst Hiestermann (Herr M), Martina Borst (Frau M), Oscar Garcia de Gracia (Hotel director), Arwed Sandner (registrar) / Celso Antunes (1st manager; head waiter), Wolf Geuer (2nd manager), Thomas Donecker (3rd manager), Christoph Scheeben (4th manager; guide), Dieter Gillessen (5th manager), Heribert Feckler: bass (6th manager), Sabine Bitter (room maid)
- Recording date: 1987
- Label: WERGO – 28 61922 (CD)
