= Jacques Stückgold =

Polish tenor

Jacques Stückgold, also Jakob Stückgold (17 January 1877 – 4 May 1953) was a Polish-German-American tenor and voice teacher.

== Life ==
Born in Warsaw (Russian Empire), Stückgold was the son of the banker Schlama Stückgold and Eva Rotmil. His elder cousin was the engineer and painter Stanislaus Stückgold. He grew up in a middle-class Jewish family interested in music. He studied singing in Warsaw, Milan, Venice and Pesaro, among others with Alessandro Bonci, Ottavio Nouvelli and Felice Coen.

Stückgold became a voice teacher, in 1899 first in Karlsruhe and then in Munich, where he sang at the National Theatre Munich. In 1926, he was appointed professor of singing at the Universität der Künste Berlin.

Stückgold married his singing student Grete Schneidt, who made a great career as soprano. They had a daughter Eva, born in 1919, the marriage was divorced in 1929. Even before the Machtergreifung by the Nazis in 1933, Berlin lecturers such as Max Trapp, Romuald Wikarski and Valeska Burgstaller were removed from the university. Stückgold was subsequently dismissed in autumn 1932 by the rector Georg Schünemann for racist reasons. and had to emigrate to the US, disenfranchised and robbed. From 1933 to 1937 he was still a professor of singing at the City College New York.

Among his students were Marcella Craft, Willi Domgraf-Fassbaender, Zdenka Faßbender, Pál Komáromy, Anny Konetzni, Bruce Low, Zinka Milanov, Nell Rankin, Hans Tänzler, Marcel Wittrisch and Fritz Zohsel.

Stückgold died in New York City at the age of 76.

== Publications ==
- Über Stimmbildungskunst
- Der Bankrott der deutschen Gesangskunst
