= Wihuri Sibelius Prize =

Finnish music award

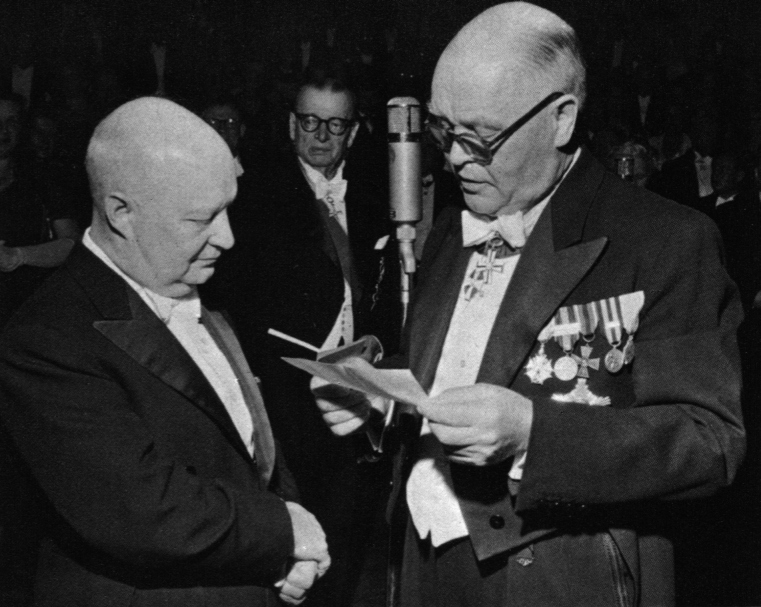
- Antti Wihuri handing over the Wihuri Sibelius Prize to Paul Hindemith in 1955. In the back President Juho Kusti Paasikivi.
- Awarded for: "prominent composers who have become internationally known and acknowledged"
- Sponsored by: Wihuri Foundation for International Prizes
- Location: Helsinki
- Country: Finland
- Reward: €150,000
- First award: 1953
- Website: wihuriprizes.fi

The Wihuri Sibelius Prize is a music prize awarded by the Wihuri Foundation for International Prizes to prominent composers who have become internationally known and acknowledged. The Wihuri Sibelius Prize is one of the biggest and most prestigious music prizes in the world of classical music. The first Sibelius Prize was awarded to Finnish composer Jean Sibelius, whom the prize was named after, in 1953. By 2026, the Wihuri Foundation for International Prizes has awarded altogether 21 Wihuri Sibelius Prizes, the latest award climbing up to €150,000 and awarded to the British composer Rebecca Saunders. The Wihuri Sibelius Prize winner is selected by a five-member committee that consists of experts from Finnish music institutions. The prize may be awarded to private individuals or organizations regardless of nationality.

== Prizewinners ==
Year	Prizewinner		Country	Notes
1953	Jean Sibelius		Finland	
1955	Paul Hindemith		West Germany	
1958	Dmitri Shostakovich		Soviet Union	
1963	Igor Stravinsky	Igor Stravinsky	United States	
1965	Benjamin Britten	Benjamin Britten	United Kingdom	
1965	Erik Bergman	Erik Bergman	Finland	
1965	Usko Meriläinen		Finland	
1965	Einojuhani Rautavaara		Finland	
1971	Olivier Messiaen		France	
1973	Witold Lutosławski		Poland	
1973	Joonas Kokkonen		Finland	
1983	Krzysztof Penderecki		Poland	
1983	Aulis Sallinen		Finland	
2000	György Ligeti		Hungary/Austria	
2003	Magnus Lindberg		Finland	
2006	Per Nørgård		Denmark	
2009	Kaija Saariaho		Finland	
2012	György Kurtág		Hungary	
2015	Harrison Birtwistle	Harrison Birtwistle	United Kingdom	
2017	Unsuk Chin		South Korea	
2020	Jukka Tiensuu		Finland	
2023	Tristan Murail		France	
2026	Rebecca Saunders		United Kingdom	
