= String Quartet No. 4 (Hindemith) =

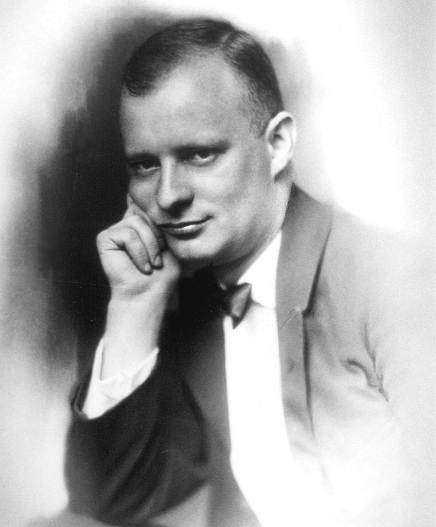
Paul Hindemith in 1923

The String Quartet No. 4, Op. 22 by Paul Hindemith was written in 1921 and published in 1923. A performance of the work takes about 26 minutes.

== Structure ==
The quartet is for two violins, viola and cello and is in five movements:

1. Fugato. Sehr langsame Viertel
2. Schnelle Achtel. Sehr energisch. Presto
3. Ruhige Viertel. Stets fließend
4. Mäßig schnelle Viertel
5. Rondo. Gemächlich und mit Grazie
