= String Trio No. 2 (Hindemith) =

- String trio by Paul Hindemith
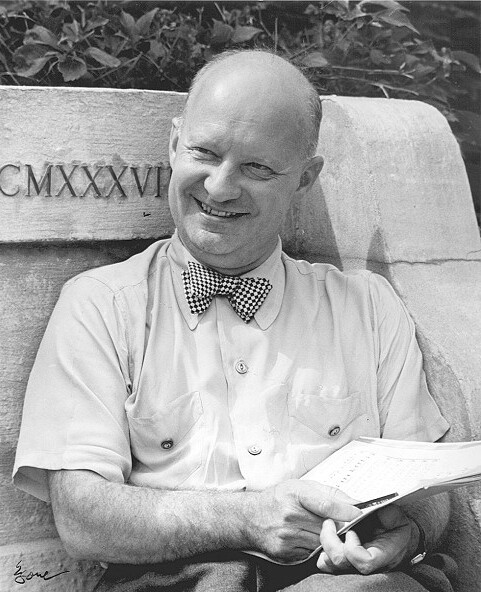
- Hindemith during the 1940s
- Native name: 2. Trio für Geige, Bratsche und Violoncello
- Year: 1933
- Published: 1933 – Mainz
- Publisher: B. Schott's Söhne
- Duration: 24 minutes approx.
- Movements: 3
- Scoring: Violin, viola, and cello

Premiere
- Date: March 17, 1933
- Location: Antwerp, Belgium
- Performers: Szymon Goldberg; Paul Hindemith; Emanuel Feuermann

String Trio No. 2 (German: 2. Trio für Geige, Bratsche und Violoncello) is the last string trio by German composer Paul Hindemith. It was composed in 1933 and recorded by the composer shortly after.

== Background ==
The Trio was composed in early 1933 and premiered on March 17, 1933, in Antwerp with Szymon Goldberg at the violin, Hindemith himself at the viola, and Emanuel Feuermann at the cello. The score was first published on 21 December 1933, followed by the performance parts on 1 February 1934, under B. Schott's Söhne. The extant autograph materials kept at the Hindemith Institute in Frankfurt include a 41-page full score completed between February and March 1933, a 17-page handwritten viola part from the same period, and substantial sketches spread across several notebooks from 1932 to 1933.

== Structure ==
Hindemith's String Trio No. 2 is a 24 minute work cast into three untitled movements:

1. Mäßig schnell
2. Lebhaft
3. Langsam – Schnelle Halbe – Langsam – Schnell, wie vorher – Äußerst lebhaft

It is scored for violin, viola, and cello. As in Hindemith’s earlier trio, the second trio presents dense and tightly woven contrapuntal textures framed by modernist harmonic and melodic features, also present in many other Hindemith works. This would later become more refined in later compositions, including Mathis der Maler.

== Recordings ==
The following is a list of recordings of Hindemith's String Trio No. 2

Recordings of Hindemith's String Trio No. 2
Violin	Viola	Cello	Date of recording	Place of recording	Label
Szymon Goldberg	Paul Hindemith	Emanuel Feuermann	January 1934	Abbey Road Studio 3, London, UK	Columbia / EMI
Frank Peter Zimmermann	Antoine Tamestit	Christian Poltéra	August 2015	Reitstadel, Neumarkt in der Oberpfalz, Germany	BIS Records
