= Marcellus Schiffer =

German writer (1892–1932)

Marcellus Schiffer was the name used by Otto Schiffer (20 June 1892 – 24 August 1932), a German cabaret writer, graphic designer, painter and librettist.

== Life ==
Schiffer was born in Berlin. His father, Siegfried Schiffer (1849–1897), was a Jewish timber merchant who died when the boy was age five. He passed his school final exams (Abitur) and went on to train with Emil Orlík as an artist, including illustrator. He was very soon forced to acknowledge that his true calling lay elsewhere, as a writer of satirical texts. During this part of his career he worked as a writer and illustrator, also producing poetry.

In the early 1920s, Schiffer got to know Marguerite "Margo" Lion, the Constantinople-born French cabaret singer who had come to Berlin in order to study at the city's Russian ballet school. Motivated, some suggest, by morbid jealousy, Schiffer turned his own talents towards the world of cabaret. He developed in Berlin a genre of his own that combined literary revue with cabaret, working between 1922 and 1925 on the shows Wilde Bühne, Rampe Tütü, Größenwahn and Katakombe. In November 1923, Lion made her own performance debut with the song created by Schiffer "The Line of Fashion" ("Die Linie der Mode"). Some years later, in 1928, the two of them were married.

Another defining collaboration involved the Russian-born composer Mischa Spoliansky who at this time as living in Berlin, and whom Schiffer first met in 1925. Together, the two of them devised a new form of sharply humorous musical theatre that combined elements of cabaret and of revue. Their first major production, Es liegt in der Luft (It's in the Air) was an instant hit with German audiences. It can be seen as Germany's first musical. However, the term was not used in Germany at this time, and the work was generally perceived as a revue.

It was a stage breakthrough in other ways, too. Lion starred alongside her younger friend, not yet famous, Marlene Dietrich. One of the highlights was the duet which the two sang together "Wenn die beste Freundin mit der besten Freundin". From now on, Schiffer was much in demand as a writer of musical cuplés in Weimar Germany.

Similarly fruitful was his relationship with the composer Paul Hindemith. This gave rise, in 1929, to the opera News of the Day (Neues vom Tage). He had written the libretto of this short opera for Hindemith a couple of years earlier.

Together with the collaborations highlighted above, Schiffer also wrote libretti for Friedrich Hollaender, Rudolf Nelson, Werner Richard Heymann and Allan Gray.

== Death ==
On 24 August 1932, Schiffer, who seems to have suffered from depression, ended his life by taking an overdose of sleeping tablets.
