= Estudiantina =

The Estudiantina waltz (or Band of Students Waltz) is a musical arrangement, made in 1883, by Émile Waldteufel, his Opus 191, No. 4. Its melody was composed earlier in 1881 by Paul Lacôme, with lyrics by Julien de Lau Lusignan.

Waldteufel first adapted it to a two-piano version, and later to an orchestral version with which classical music audiences are familiar today. The main melody is universally recognized by Americans of a certain age as the Rheingold Beer jingle, with the words "My beer is Rheingold the dry beer. Think of Rheingold whenever you buy beer. It's not bitter, not sweet, it's the extra dry treat—Won't you try extra dry Rheingold beer?". And in Germany the main melody is very popular because of a song called "Spaniens Gitarren" sung by the singers Cindy & Bert in 4/4 time which was a great hit for them in 1974.

The waltz does not have the extended introduction so often favoured by Waldteufel and begins instead with a brief fanfare which announces the waltz's 3/4 time. The refrain is in D major, and is repeated twice. The second section is in G major, with a quiet repetitive note melody followed by a midsection D major part. The third part of the arrangement is in D major, with a contrasting B minor part. The final section is back in G major, this time a quieter part than the previous sections, rounded up by an ebullient chorded phrase. The main introduction is played again, as is the refrain. After a brief reprise of the second section melody in a different key, the refrain is repeated again and the waltz ends on a high-spirited note.
