= Trauermusik =

Suite by Paul Hindemith

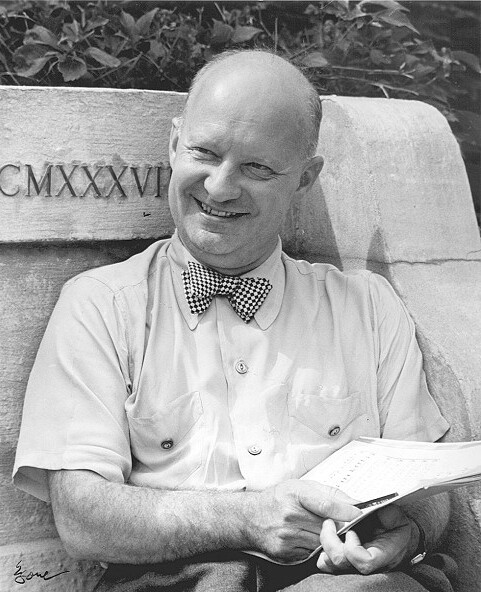
Paul Hindemith in the 1940s

Trauermusik is a suite for viola and string orchestra, written on 21 January 1936 by Paul Hindemith at very short notice in memory of King George V of the United Kingdom, who had died the previous night. The title means "Mourning Music" or "Funeral Music" in English, but the work is always known by its German title.

== Background ==
On 19 January 1936, Paul Hindemith travelled to London, intending to play his viola concerto Der Schwanendreher, with Adrian Boult and the BBC Symphony Orchestra in Queen's Hall, on 22 January. This was to be the British premiere of the work.

However, just before midnight on 20 January, King George V died. The concert was cancelled, but Boult and the BBC music producer Edward Clark still wanted Hindemith's involvement in any music that was broadcast in its place. They debated for hours what might be a suitable piece, but nothing could be found, so it was decided that Hindemith should write something new. The following day, from 11 a.m. to 5 p.m., Hindemith sat in an office made available to him by the BBC and wrote Trauermusik in homage to the late king. It was written for viola and string orchestra (Der Schwanendreher employs a larger complement that includes woodwinds). Trauermusik was performed that evening in a live broadcast from a BBC radio studio, with Boult conducting and the composer as soloist.

== The music ==
Trauermusik consists of four very short movements. The first movement is marked Langsam. The second movement (Ruhig bewegt) is less than a minute in length and the third is only slightly longer.

The last movement is the heart of the work. Hindemith intended to quote the chorale "Vor deinen Thron tret' ich hiermit" ("Here I appear in front of Thy throne"), the words being well known from Johann Sebastian Bach's deathbed composition. Hindemith chose Bach's harmonisation BWV 327, unaware at the time, that the original manuscript of this setting is without text and that the text "Vor deinen Thron" was added only by the editors of the Bach-Gesellschafts-Ausgabe, whereas Bach for "Vor deinen Thron" always used the tune "Wenn wir in höchsten Nöten sein". The tune of BWV 327, on its part, was very familiar in England as the "Old 100th", to the words "All people that on Earth do dwell".

The piece also contains quotations from Symphony: Mathis der Maler and Der Schwanendreher. Trauermusik immediately entered the repertoire of violists, as well as cellists and even violinists.

The Swiss philanthropist and music patron Werner Reinhart, to whom Hindemith had dedicated his Clarinet Quintet in 1923, later told Gertrud Hindemith "there was something Mozartian" about her husband's writing Trauermusik in half a day, and premiering it the same day. "I know no one else today who could do that", he said.
