= Symphonic Metamorphosis of Themes by Carl Maria von Weber =

Orchestral composition by Paul Hindemith

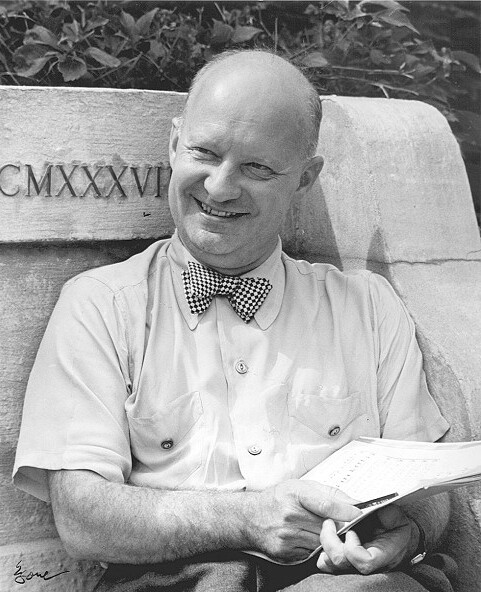
Paul Hindemith in the 1940s

Symphonic Metamorphosis of Themes by Carl Maria von Weber is an orchestral work written by German composer Paul Hindemith in the United States in 1943.

== History ==
The idea of composing a work based on Carl Maria von Weber's music was first put to Hindemith in 1940 by the choreographer and dancer Léonide Massine, who suggested that he should arrange music by Weber for a ballet. When Hindemith made a piano arrangement in March 1940 of the two pieces that would become movements 1 and 3 of the Metamorphosis (which in a letter of April 12, 1940 he described as "lightly coloured and made a bit sharper"), Massine expressed a preference for more strict arrangements of Weber. This was one reason the project fell through. After studying Weber's music, Hindemith watched one of Massine's ballets and disliked it, and so wrote the Symphonic Metamorphosis instead. The Andantino and Marsch were completed on June 8 and June 13, 1943, respectively, and the manuscript of the complete orchestral score is dated August 29, 1943.

Although by its thematic material it belongs squarely in the European tradition, it was composed with the virtuosity of American symphony orchestras in mind, and was titled originally in English. Other lands later translated it variously into German as Symphonische Metamorphose von [über/nach/zu] Themen Carl Maria von Webers; two German editions mistakenly give the title in the plural, Sinfonische Metamorphosen nach Themen von Carl Maria von Weber, and Sinfonische Metamorphosen Carl Maria von Weber’scher Themen, though none of these German titles were sanctioned by Hindemith. They nevertheless have sometimes been back-translated into English as Metamorphoses on Themes by .... The work is also sometimes known in English as Symphonic Variations on (or of) Themes by Carl Maria von Weber but, despite the title's reference to "themes", the work incorporates material more broadly from whole works by Weber.

The Symphonic Metamorphosis is in four movements:

1. Allegro
2. Scherzo (Turandot): Moderato – Lively
3. Andantino
4. Marsch

The Weber themes are taken from incidental music which Weber wrote for a play by Carlo Gozzi, based on the same Turandot legend that later inspired Giacomo Puccini and others. Hindemith and his wife would play Weber's music for piano four-hands, and Hindemith used some of these little-known pieces—Op. 60/4 (no. 253 in the Jähns catalog of Weber's works) (first movement), Op. 37 (J. 75) (second movement), Op. 10/2 (J. 82) (third movement), and Op. 60/7 (J. 265) (fourth movement) for the themes of the other movements. Weber's piano duets were written around 1802–03, 1809, and 1818–19, his Turandot music in 1809.

The work was first performed on January 20, 1944, in New York City, with Artur Rodziński conducting the New York Philharmonic-Symphony Orchestra. The New York Times described the piece as "a novelty ... [which] was one of the most entertaining scores that he has thus far given us, a real jeu d'esprit by a great master of his medium in a singularly happy mood."

== Ballet productions ==
George Balanchine later choreographed the work for the New York City Ballet, under the title Metamorphoses. This ballet version, with costumes by Barbara Karinska and lighting by Jean Rosenthal, was first announced for the week of 17 November, but was postponed and finally premiered on 25 November 1952. The principal dancers were Tanaquil LeClercq, Todd Bolender, and Nicholas Magallanes, and the orchestra was conducted by Léon Barzin. The company revived the production for the 1954 season.

A new choreography to Hindemith's music was devised by Jimmy Gamonet De Los Heros for a 1990 production at Wolf Trap, titled Movilissimanoble, but was pronounced "at best a qualified success as a symphonic abstraction in a neo-Balanchinian mode". A year later, the Tokyo Festival Ballet brought to New York Minoru Suzuki's Henyo: Unknown Symphony, a ballet danced to a recording of Hindemith's music, but it was not well-received: "The choreography kept 16 dancers busy. Yet the work was more notable for its abundance of steps than for its clarity of structure".

== Instrumentation ==
The Metamorphosis is scored for a typical Romantic-sized orchestra.

- Woodwinds: piccolo, 2 flutes, 2 oboes, English horn, 2 clarinets in B♭, bass clarinet, 2 bassoons, contrabassoon.
- Brass: 4 horns in F, 2 trumpets in B♭, 2 tenor trombones, bass trombone, tuba.
- Percussion: timpani, 4 other players playing snare drum, tambourine, triangle, Glockenspiel, bass drum, cymbals, small cymbals, suspended cymbal, tam-tam, tubular bells, tom-tom, small gong, wood block, tenor drum
- Strings: violin I, violin II, violas, violoncellos, double basses
