= Bernhard Bötel =

German opera singer

Bernhard Bötel

Bernhard Bötel (1883 – 1953) was a German operatic tenor and actor who had an active career in Germany and Austria during the first half of the 20th century. He made recordings for several record labels during the early years of the recording industry, including His Master's Voice, Odeon Records, Polydor Records, Tri-Ergon, and Vox Records. On the stage he sang a variety of roles in operas and operettas from leading parts to comprimario roles. His stage repertoire included Belmonte in Wolfgang Amadeus Mozart's Die Entführung aus dem Serail, Chapelou in Adolphe Adam's Le postillon de Lonjumeau, Count Almaviva in Gioachino Rossini's The Barber of Seville, Daniel in Franz Lehár's The Merry Widow, the Duke of Mantua in Giuseppe Verdi's Rigoletto, Gabriel von Eisenstein in Johann Strauss II's Die Fledermaus, Indigo in Strauss' Indigo und die vierzig Räuber, Jeník in Bedřich Smetana's The Bartered Bride, Paolino in Domenico Cimarosa's Il matrimonio segreto, Pâris in Jacques Offenbach's La belle Hélène, Pietro in Franz von Suppé's Boccaccio, and Wilhelm Meister in Ambroise Thomas' Mignon.

Bötel was the son of tenor Heinrich Bötel. He began his voice training with Mathieu Lorent in Hamburg, and later continued his studies with Ernst Grenzebach in Berlin. He made his professional stage debut in 1905 at Theater Aachen as Lancelot in Edmond Audran's La poupée. From 1906 until 1910, he was committed to the Komische Oper Berlin where he was lauded for his portrayal of the title role in Offenbach's The Tales of Hoffmann. From 1909 to 1911, he sang in several operettas at the Theater an der Wien; most notably creating the role of Armand Brissard in the world premiere of Lehár's Der Graf von Luxemburg in November 1909. From 1912 to 1914, he was committed to the Raimund Theater in Vienna, and in 1914–1915 he was a member of the Halle Opera House. He spent the next two decades performing roles from the tenor buffo repertoire at the Berlin State Opera. In 1917, he created the lead tenor role of Hans in the premier of Jugend by Ignatz Waghalter at the Deutsche Opernhaus in Berlin. He also appeared at the Kroll Opera House from 1928 to 1931 and frequently as a leading tenor in operettas in Berlin opposite soprano Fritzi Massary. He retired from the stage in 1935.

Bötel also occasionally worked as a dramatic actor and appeared in three silent films during his career: Martha (1916), Rheinzauber (1920), and Trick-Track (1921).
