= Ludus Tonalis =

Piano work by Paul Hindemith

- by Paul Hindemith
- Incipit and the mirrored final measures of the suite.
- English: Play of Tones
- Composed: August 8–October 9, 1942, New Haven.
- Performed: February 15, 1943. Chicago.
- Movements: 25
- Scoring: Piano

Ludus Tonalis ("Play of Tones"), subtitled Kontrapunktische, tonale, und Klaviertechnische Übungen (Counterpoint, tonal and technical studies for the piano), is a 1942 piano work by Paul Hindemith. It was composed during his stay in the United States and was his last piano piece. The suite of 25 pieces demonstrates Hindemith's ideas about tonality and his mastery of counterpoint.

== Background ==
While Paul Hindemith was teaching at the Yale School of Music, he began writing small three-voice fugues for keyboard. When he decided to base their key sequence on his theoretical writing, the collection expanded. He settled on the title Ludus Tonalis with medieval liturgical dramas as a model. "Play of Tones" most directly reflects Hindemith's meaning, rather than translations of "ludus" as a game.

Ludus Tonalis is the most direct application of Hindemith's theory that the twelve tones of the equally tempered scale all relate to a keynote or tonic. In this system, the major-minor duality is meaningless. The affinity of each note with the keynote is directly related to its position on the harmonic scale.

It was first performed on February 15, 1943 in Chicago by Willard MacGregor. The program included Hindemith's sonatas for flute and two pianos. Hindemith had low commercial expectations for the piece, even though he saw its completion as a moral victory. He harangued Associated Music Publishers to quickly bring out an engraved edition as part of their "responsibility to history". The first printing sold out in three months.

Ludus Tonalis is often compared to Johann Sebastian Bach's The Well-Tempered Clavier. In its abstraction, it might be more akin to The Art of the Fugue. It functions as a kind of catalogue for Hindemith's mature style.

Hindemith created a special edition of the score for his wife's birthday. He called it Ludi leonum, and it features his own drawings on the AMP score. The primary characters are lions, and they often parody the musical architecture. Hindemith accompanies each entrance of the fugue subject with a lion.

== Structure ==
In The Craft of Musical Composition, Paul Hindemith devised the tonal relationships that create the structure for Ludus Tonalis. Instead of proceeding chromatically through all twelve pitches, the suite's tonal centers proceed in what Hindemith called "Serie 1": C–G–F–A–E–E♭–A♭–D–B♭–D♭–B–F♯. Between each three-part fugue, Hindemith composes an interlude that links the preceding and ensuing key. The suite opens with a "Praeludium" which is repeated in retrograde inversion in the "Postludium". The fugues catalog nearly every variety of the form, including double, triple, retrograde, and canonic fugues. The interrelations between the components of each movement consistently reflect their relation to the cycle as a whole.

== Content ==
1. Praeludium. Partly in C (mm. 1–32) and partly in F♯ (mm. 34–47)
2. Fuga prima in C: Triple fugue
3. Interludium: Romantic improvisation
4. Fuga secunda in G: Dance in 5/8 time
5. Interludium: Pastorale
6. Fuga tertia in F: Mirror fugue, where the second half is an exact retrograde of the first, except with voice paddings at their end exits.
7. Interludium: Folk dance (Gavotte)
8. Fuga quarta in A: Double fugue
9. Interludium: Baroque prelude
10. Fuga quinta in E: Gigue
11. Interludium: Romantic miniature (Chopin style)
12. Fuga sexta in E♭: Rococo style
13. Interludium: March - The mirrors of the fugues and interludes pause at the mid-point of the cycle with a straightforward parody of a march.
14. Fuga septima in A♭: Romantic style
15. Interludium: Romantic miniature (Brahms style)
16. Fuga octava in D: Dance in 5/4 time (though notated in 4/4)
17. Interludium: Baroque toccata
18. Fuga nona in B♭: Subject transformation fugue
19. Interludium: Pastorale
20. Fuga decima in D♭: Inversion fugue
21. Interludium: Folk dance (Courante)
22. Fuga undecima in B (canon): Accompanied canon
23. Interludium: Romantic waltz
24. Fuga duodecima in F♯: Stretto fugue
25. Postludium: Retrograde inversion of the Praeludium.
