= Émile Waldteufel =

French composer (1837–1915)

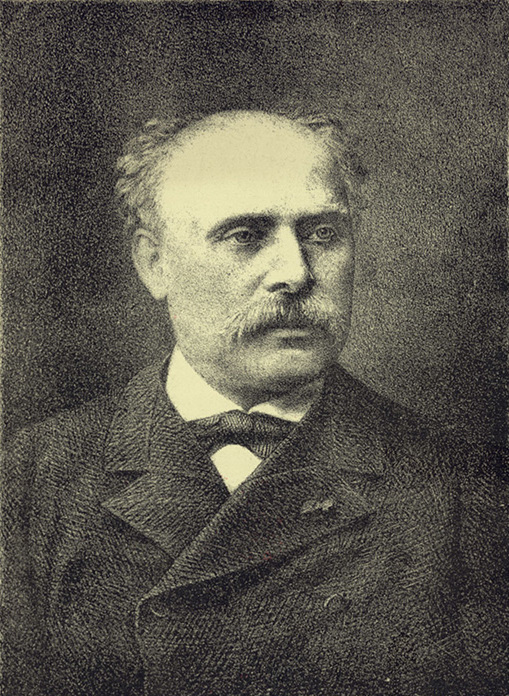
Portrait of Émile Waldteufel

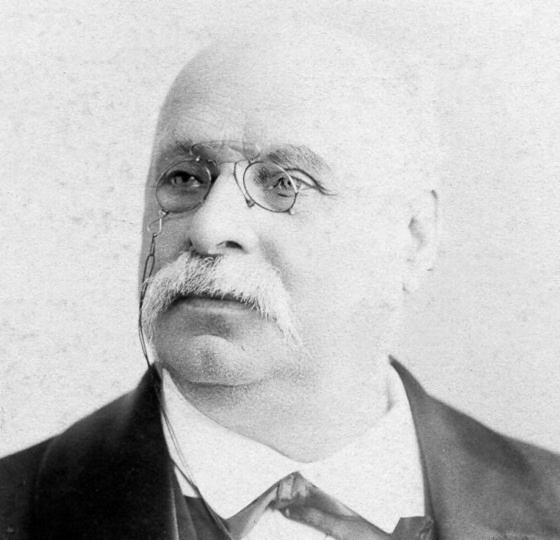
Émile Waldteufel, c. 1900

Charles Émile Waldteufel (né Lévy; French pronunciation: [valtøfɛl]; German: [ˈvalt.tɔɪ̯fl̩]; 9 December 1837 – 12 February 1915) was a French composer, pianist, and conductor known for his numerous popular salon pieces. Among his best known works is "Les Patineurs" (1882), known as "The Skater's Waltz".

== Life ==
Waldteufel was born Charles Émile Lévy at 84 Grand'Rue in the centre of Strasbourg. From a Jewish Alsatian family of musicians, his grandfather, father, and two uncles were all dance musicians who had used the name "Waldteufel" (German for forest devil) professionally. His father, Lazare Levy, led a respected orchestra, and his brother Léon was a successful performer. When Léon won a place to study violin at the Conservatoire de Paris, the family followed him there. Waldteufel's mother Flora Neubauer, originally from Bavaria, had been a student of Hummel and had met Haydn; she was also a keen singer and dancer.

Waldteufel received his first lessons from his father and from the local musician Joseph Heyberger. After his arrival in Paris he could take classes from Laurent at the Conservatoire de Paris, followed by advanced studies under Marmontel. Among his fellow students was Jules Massenet.

The young Émile was obliged to halt his studies and work at the Scholtus piano factory owing to the financial situation of the family, but soon took a room at rue de Bellefond in order to concentrate on composing. During his time at the Conservatory, Louis Waldteufel's orchestra became famous in Paris, and Émile was frequently invited to play at important events.

At the age of 27, Waldteufel became the court pianist of Empress Eugénie. He also led the orchestra at state balls. His appointment by Napoléon III as the musical director of the balls led him to participation in the events in Biarritz and Compiègne; at the latter he met many other musicians and artists and also accompanied the emperor playing the violin.

In 1868, he married Célestine Dufau, a former singer from Toulouse who had appeared at the Opéra-Comique. They had three children, Louis René, Émile René and Berthe.

At the outbreak of the Franco-Prussian War in 1870, Waldteufel enlisted and was stationed in the Basses-Pyrénées. After the defeat of France the Second French Empire was dissolved and his home town became part of Germany for the rest of his life. After the Empire, the orchestra still played at presidential balls at the Élysée. At this time only a few members of French high society knew of Waldteufel; he was nearly 40 before he became better known.

In October 1874, Waldteufel played at an event that was attended by the then Prince of Wales, future King Edward VII of the United Kingdom. The Prince was enthralled by Waldteufel's Manolo waltz, and was prepared to make Waldteufel's music known in Britain. A long-term contract with the London-based publisher Hopwood & Crew followed. Part of the company belonged to Charles Coote, director of the Coote & Tinney's Band, the first dance orchestra in London. Through these means, Waldteufel's music was performed at Buckingham Palace in front of Queen Victoria. Waldteufel was a major force in the music scene of London and became world-famous. During this period he composed his best known works, many of which are still heard today around the world. He became best known for the waltz "Les Patineurs" (The Ice Skaters), composed in 1882.

Waldteufel gave concerts in several European cities including London in 1885, Berlin in 1889 (where he enjoyed a friendly rivalry with Johann Strauss), and the Paris Opéra Balls in 1890 and 1891. He continued his career as conductor and composer of dance music for the presidential balls until retiring in 1899.

Waldteufel died at his home, 37 rue Saint-Georges in Paris, at the age of 77. He and his wife (who had died the year before) were buried in Père Lachaise.

Waldteufel composed at and for the piano (often for performance at court) before orchestrating many of the works. He conducted with a stick rather than the then-customary violin bow. The typical Waldteufel orchestra consisted of strings and a doubled woodwind section, two cornets, four horns, three trombones, and ophicleide or euphonium, along with percussion. Waldteufel's music can be distinguished from Johann Strauss II's waltzes and polkas in that he used subtle harmonies and gentle phrases, unlike Strauss's more robust approach.

A biography of the Waldteufel family by Andrew Lamb (Skaters' Waltz: The Story of the Waldteufels) was published in 1995.

His waltz Dolorès, Op. 170 (1880) was the basis for the Russian romance Honey, do you hear me (Russian: «Милая, ты услышь меня»).

== Works ==
=== (with opus number) ===
- Kamiesch, march, Op. 5
- Myosotis, waltz (Vergissmeinnicht), Op. 101
- Jean qui pleure et Jean qui rit, polka burlesque, Op. 106
- Bella, polka-mazurka, Op. 113 (1867)
- Dans les bois, polka-mazurka, Op. 119
- Les Lointains, waltz, Op. 121
- Mellow Waltz, Op. 123 (1866)
- Carolinen, polka, Op. 124
- Dans les champs, polka-mazurka, Op. 125 (1868)
- Madeleine, waltz, Op. 126
- Desirée, polka-mazurka, Op. 132
- Térésa (also Antoinette), waltz, Op. 133 (1864)
- Joujou-Polka, Op. 135
- Manolo, waltz, Op. 140 (1874?)
- Roses et marguerites, waltz, Op. 141
- Tout à vous, waltz, Op. 142 (1875)
- Bien-aimés Waltz, Op. 143 (1875)
- Entre nous Waltz, Op. 144 (1876)
- Flots de joie, waltz, Op. 145 (1875)
- Grand vitesse, galop, Op. 146 (1876)
- Violettes waltz, Op. 148 (1876)
- Au revoir, waltz, Op.149 (1876)
- A toi, waltz, Op. 150
- Mon rêve, waltz, Op. 151 (1877)
- Prestissimo, galop, Op. 152 (1877)
- Hommage aux dames, waltz, Op. 153
- Les Sirènes, waltz, Op. 154 (1878)
- Pomona Waltz, Op. 155 (1877)
- Toujours ou jamais, waltz, Op. 156 (1877)
- Les Folies, polka, Op. 157 (1878)
- Très jolie, waltz, Op. 159 (1878)
- Pluie de diamants, waltz, Op. 160 (1879)
- La Berceuse, waltz, Op. 161
- Brune ou blonde, waltz, Op. 162 (1878)
- Bonne bouche (also Bella bocca), polka, Op. 163 (1879)
- Gaîté waltz, Op. 164 (1878)
- Ma charmante waltz, Op. 166 (1879)
- Autres fois, waltz, Op. 167
- Minuit, polka, Op. 168
- Toujours fidèle, waltz, Op. 169 (1879)
- Dolores Waltz, Op. 170 (1880)
- Chantilly, waltz, Op. 171 (1880)
- Solitude, waltz, Op. 174 (1881)
- Jeunesse dorée, waltz, Op. 175 (1881)
- Je t'aime, waltz, Op. 177 (1882)
- La Barcarolle, waltz, Op. 178 (1882)
- Naples, waltz, Op. 179
- La Source, waltz, Op. 180 (1882)
- Trictrac, polka, Op. 181
- L'Esprit français, polka, Op. 182 (1882)
- Les Patineurs, waltz, Op. 183 (1882)
- Mariana, waltz, Op. 185
- Les Sourires, waltz, Op. 187 (1883)
- Soirée d'été, waltz, Op. 188 (1883)
- En Garde!, polka militaire, Op. 189
- Les Fleurs, waltz, Op. 190 (1883)
- Estudiantina, waltz, Op. 191 (1883) (arrangement from Paul Lacome's reputed "Duos")
- Près de toi, waltz, Op. 193
- Nid d'amour, waltz, Op. 195
- Jeux d'esprit, polka, Op. 196
- Camarade, polka, Op. 197
- Joie envolée, waltz, Op. 198
- Trésor d'amour, waltz, Op. 199 (1885)
- Tout en rose, waltz, Op. 200 (1885)
- Un premier bouquet, waltz, Op. 201 (1885)
- Rêverie, waltz, Op. 202 (1885)
- Retour des champs, polka, Op. 203 (1885)
- Illusion, waltz, Op. 204
- Ma Voisine, polka, Op. 206 (1886)
- The Grenadiers, waltz militaire, Op. 207
- Dans les nuages, waltz, Op. 208 (1886)
- Idylle, waltz, Op. 209
- Tendres baisers, waltz, Op. 211
- La Cinquantaine, polka, Op. 215 (1886)
- Les Bohémiens, polka, Op. 216 (1887)
- Tendresse, waltz, Op. 217
- Coquetterie, waltz, Op. 218 (1887)
- Tout ou rien, polka, Op. 219 (1887)
- Acclamations, waltz, Op. 223 (1888)
- Papillons bleus, waltz, Op. 224
- Château en Espagne, polka, Op. 225 (1888)
- Dans tes yeux, waltz, Op. 227
- Hébé, waltz, Op. 228 (1888)
- Etincelles, waltz, Op. 229
- Roses de Noël, waltz, Op. 230 (1889)
- Rococo-Polka, Op. 232 (1888)
- Bagatelle, polka, Op. 233
- Sur la plage, waltz, Op. 234
- Vision, waltz, Op. 235 (1888)
- España, waltz, Op. 236 (1886) (after Chabrier)
- L'Étoile polaire, waltz, Op. 238
- Par-ci, par-là, polka, Op. 239 (1883)
- Tout-Paris, waltz, Op. 240 (1889)
- Ange d'amour, waltz, Op. 241 (1889)
- Nuée d'oiseaux, polka, Op. 243 (1890)
- Retour de printemps, waltz, Op. 244
- Invitation à la gavotte, Op. 246 (1891)
- Fontaine lumineuse, waltz, Op. 247 (1891)
- Zig-zag, polka, Op. 248 (1891)
- Sous la voûte étoilée, waltz, Op. 253 (1892)
- Souveraine, mazurka, Op. 255 (1893)

=== (without opus number) ===
- Amour et printemps, waltz (1880)
- Fleurs et baisers, waltz (1904)
- Béobile, pizzicato (1908?)
- La Fauvette du temple, waltz (1885) (after Messager)

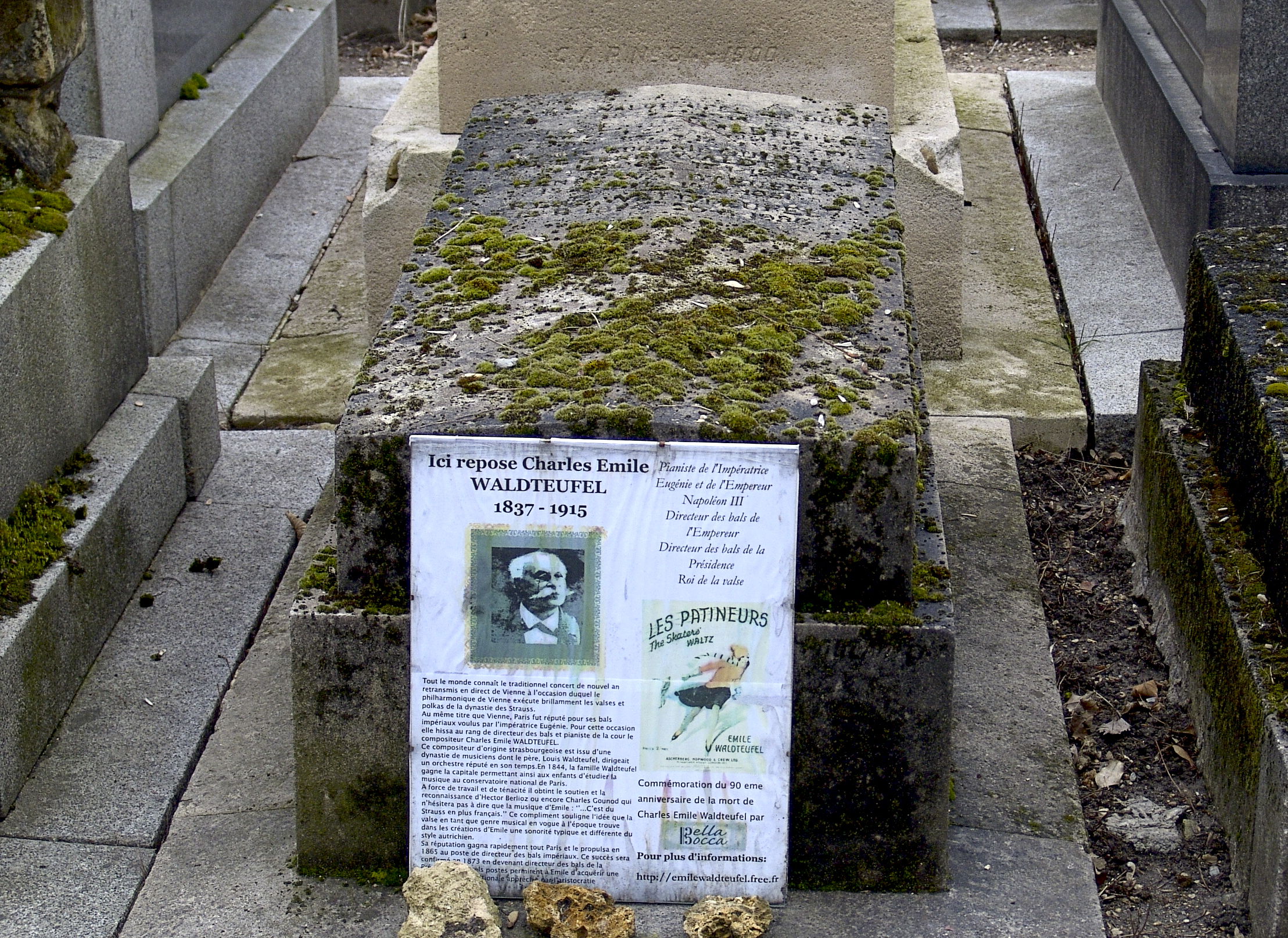
Grave of Émile Waldteufel at Père Lachaise Cemetery

== In popular culture ==
Waldteufel's 1886 waltz España is largely based on Chabrier's España but also includes a section from Chabrier's Une Éducation manquée. Chabrier's rhapsody is also the basis of the melody of the 1956 American popular song "Hot Diggity (Dog Ziggity Boom)" by Al Hoffman and Dick Manning, made popular by Perry Como in 1956.

The Retour de printemps waltz was used as incidental ballroom music during Orson Welles' and the Campbell Playhouse's 1939 adaptation of The Count of Monte Cristo.

A melody from the Estudiantina waltz was used as the tune of an advertising jingle for Rheingold Beer ("My beer, is Rheingold, the dry beer ..."). Estudiantina was played by I Salonisti in James Cameron's 1997 movie Titanic.
