= Der Schwanendreher =

Viola concerto by Paul Hindemith

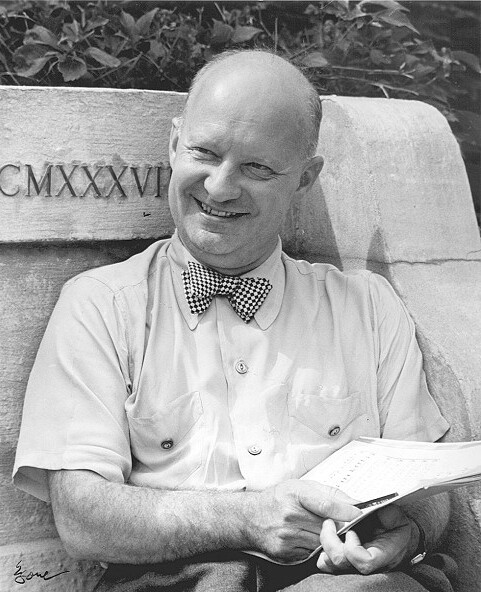
Paul Hindemith in the 1940s

Paul Hindemith's Der Schwanendreher (literally, "The Swan Turner") is a concerto for viola and orchestra. Der Schwanendreher occupies a place at the core of the viola concerto repertoire, along with the concertos by Walton and Bartók. It was composed in 1935 and premiered by the composer himself at a performance in Amsterdam on 14 November 1935. Each movement is based on a separate medieval German folk song, thus, it is sometimes referred to as the "Concerto from Old Folk Songs". This composition draws its title from the final movement's folk song base, "Aren't you the swan turner?"

The orchestra calls for 2 flutes (one doubling on piccolo), oboe, 2 clarinets, 2 bassoons, 3 horns, trumpet, trombone, timpani, harp, and a string section of 4 cellos and 3 double basses. This orchestration is interesting due to its lack of violins and violas which benefits the composition by making it easier for the solo viola to be heard.

The movements are:

1. "Zwischen Berg und tiefem Tal": Langsam – Mäßig bewegt, mit Kraft ("Between mountain and deep valley": Slow – Moderately moving, with strength)
2. "Nun laube, Lindlein laube": Sehr ruhig – Fugato: "Der Gutzgauch auf dem Zaune sass" ("Now grow leaves, little linden tree, grow leaves": very calm – Fugato: "The Cuckoo Sat on the Fence")
3. Variationen: "Seid ihr nicht der Schwanendreher": Mäßig schnell (Variations: "Aren't you the swan turner?": Moderately fast)

== Meaning of title ==
The concerto's title, translated as "The Swan Turner", comes from the name of the last and fourth German folk song used (namely in the third movement), entitled "Seid ihr nicht der Schwanendreher" ("Aren't you the swan turner?"). The original context of "swan turner" in medieval times is that of a cook's assistant who would turn the handle of a spit on which swans were roasting. However, in the context of the concerto itself (and evidenced in the text of the folk song), the meaning programmatically seems to refer to a wandering medieval minstrel, or organ grinder, who plays on an instrument such as the hurdy-gurdy (and providing embellishments and rhapsodies on the folk tunes), which has a handle shaped as a swan's neck, thus the "swan turner" being the travelling musician himself, described by the composer in the preface notes to the work.

== Planned British premiere ==
The British premiere was scheduled for 22 January 1936, with the composer as soloist in London. However, just before midnight on 20 January, King George V died. The following day, from 11 am to 5 pm, Hindemith wrote Trauermusik in homage to the late king. It was scored for viola and string orchestra, and was performed that evening, in a live broadcast from a BBC studio, with Adrian Boult conducting and the composer as soloist. The scheduled premiere of Der Schwanendreher was cancelled. Trauermusik contains quotations from Symphony: Mathis der Maler and Der Schwanendreher.
