= Sonata for Solo Viola No. 2 (Hindemith) =

- by Paul Hindemith
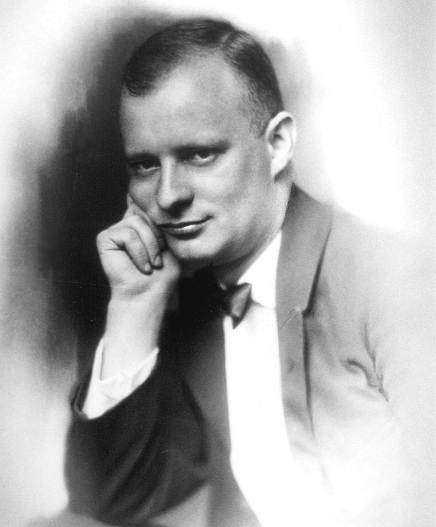
- Hindemith in 1923
- Opus: Op. 25, No. 1
- Year: 1922
- Genre: Modern music
- Dedication: Ladislav Černý
- Published: 1923
- Publisher: Schott Music
- Duration: 15 minutes
- Movements: 5
- Scoring: Solo viola

Premiere
- Date: March 18, 1922
- Location: Cologne
- Performers: Paul Hindemith

The Sonata for Solo Viola No. 2, Op. 25/1, is the second of German composer Paul Hindemith's four sonatas for unaccompanied viola. Completed in 1922, it is part of an opus that also includes three other sonatas for different instruments.

== Background ==
Hindemith, a well known viola player in the late 1910s, leapt to prominence as Germany's leading young composer in 1919, after having passed an expressionist phase and turning to a neo-Baroque, neoclassical style, which was then called "New Objectivity" (Neue Sachlichkeit). The composer presented and first performed the second viola sonata in Cologne on March 18, 1922, having completed it that same month. Dedicated to Ladislav Černý, violist of the Zika Quartet, the sonata was published by Schott Music in 1923.

== Structure ==
The sonata is scored for solo viola and has a total duration of around 15 minutes. It is divided into five movements of unequal length, which follow a three-part sonata form:

1. Breit
2. Sehr frisch und straff
3. Sehr langsam
4. Rasendes Zeitmaß. Wild. Tonschönheit ist Nebensache
5. Langsam, mit viel Ausdruck

Hindemith opens this sonata with an aggressive chordal sequence against a more melodic thematic material, which leads attacca to the next movement, "very fresh and taut". Then, the third and fifth movements share thematic material and are, in essence, elegiac and emotionally charged. The fourth movement uses a repeated pedal-like low C with rapid single interjections in the form of chords, following a scherzo-like structure. The tempo in this movement is unusually fast ( = 600–640). All movements have tempo indications but none of them have key or time signatures.

== Recordings ==
- The first, authoritative recording was made by Hindemith himself. The recording took place in January 1934, in Abbey Road Studio 3, in London.
- Violist Kim Kashkashian made a recording of the piece which was released in April 1988 by ECM Records.
- Violist Lawrence Power also recorded the piece in a sonatas for solo viola cycle. Power recorded the piece in 2009, in Monmouth. The recording was later released by Hyperion Records.
