= Konzertmusik für Streichorchester und Blechbläser =

Orchestral composition by Paul Hindemith

Konzertmusik für Streichorchester und Blechbläser (German for Concert Music for String Orchestra and Brass), Op. 50, is a work by Paul Hindemith, composed in 1930. It was one of a large group of pieces commissioned for the 50th anniversary of the Boston Symphony Orchestra by its music director, Serge Koussevitzky (others include the Piano Concerto in G major by Maurice Ravel, the Symphony of Psalms by Igor Stravinsky, and Aaron Copland's Symphonic Ode). Koussevitzky conducted the premiere of Hindemith's work with the Boston Symphony Orchestra on 3 April 1931.

This was the last of three works that Hindemith designated Konzertmusik in 1930: the others were the Konzertmusik für Solobratsche und größeres Kammerorchester (Concert Music for Solo Viola and Larger Chamber Orchestra), Op. 48, and the Konzertmusik für Klavier, Blechbläser und Harfen (Concert Music for Piano, Brass and Harps), Op. 49. Opus 50 was the last piece to which Hindemith assigned an opus number.

Some twenty minutes in duration, Hindemith's score is cast in two movements, each divided into several sections:

1. Mässig schnell, mit Kraft – Sehr breit, aber stets fließend (Moderately fast, with power – Very broad, but always flowing)
2. Lebhaft – Langsam – Im ersten Zeitmaß (Fast – Slow – Tempo primo)

== Instrumentation ==
The score of this work calls for 4 French horns in F, 4 trumpets in C, 3 trombones, bass tuba and a four-section string orchestra of violins, violas, cellos and double basses.
