= Paul Hindemith =

German composer (1895–1963)

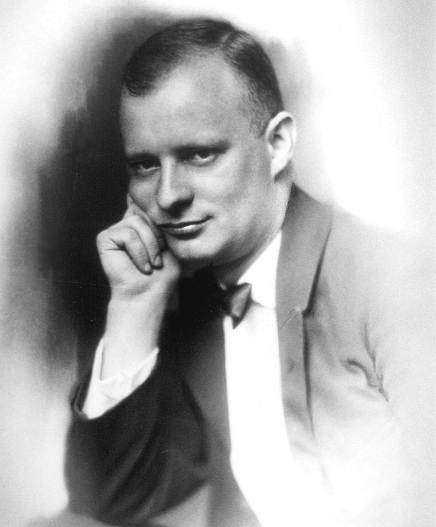
- Hindemith in 1923
- Born: 16 November 1895; Hanau, German Empire
- Died: 28 December 1963 (aged 68); Frankfurt, West Germany
- Education: Dr. Hoch's Konservatorium
- Occupations: Violist; Composer; Teacher
- Organizations: Frankfurt Opera Orchestra; Amar Quartet; Donaueschingen Festival; Yale University; University of Zürich
- Works: Compositions
- Awards: Howland Memorial Prize; Pour le Mérite; Wihuri Sibelius Prize; Balzan Prize

Paul Hindemith (/ˈpaʊl ˈhɪndəmɪt/ POWL HIN-də-mit; German: [ˌpaʊ̯l ˈhɪndəmɪt]; 16 November 1895 – 28 December 1963) was a German and American composer, music theorist, teacher, violist, and conductor. He founded the Amar Quartet in 1921, touring extensively in Europe. As a composer, he became a major advocate of the Neue Sachlichkeit (New Objectivity) style of music in the 1920s, with compositions such as Kammermusik, including works with viola and viola d'amore as solo instruments in a neo-Bachian spirit. His other notable compositions include the song cycle Das Marienleben (1923), Der Schwanendreher for viola and orchestra (1935), the opera Mathis der Maler (1938) and the symphony Mathis der Maler (1934), the Symphonic Metamorphosis of Themes by Carl Maria von Weber (1943), and the oratorio When Lilacs Last in the Dooryard Bloom'd (1946), a requiem based on Walt Whitman's poem. Hindemith and his wife emigrated to Switzerland and the United States ahead of World War II, after worsening difficulties with the Nazi German regime. In his later years, he conducted and recorded much of his own music.

Most of Hindemith's compositions are anchored by a foundational tone, and use musical forms and counterpoint and cadences typical of the Baroque and Classical traditions. His harmonic language is more modern, freely using all 12 notes of the chromatic scale within his tonal framework, as detailed in his three-volume treatise, The Craft of Musical Composition.

== Life and career ==
Paul Hindemith conducting (ca. 1958)

Paul Hindemith was born in Hanau, near Frankfurt, the eldest child of the painter and decorator Robert Hindemith from Lower Silesia and his wife Marie (née Warnecke). He was taught the violin as a child. He entered Frankfurt's Dr. Hoch's Konservatorium, where he studied violin with Adolf Rebner, as well as conducting and composition with Arnold Mendelssohn and Bernhard Sekles. At first he supported himself by playing in dance bands and musical-comedy groups. He became deputy leader of the Frankfurt Opera Orchestra in 1914 and was promoted to concertmaster in 1916. He played second violin in the Rebner String Quartet from 1914.

After his father's 1915 death in World War I, Hindemith was conscripted into the Imperial German Army in September 1917 and sent to a regiment in Alsace in January 1918. There he was assigned to play bass drum in the regiment band, and also formed a string quartet. In May 1918 he was deployed to the front in Flanders, where he served as a sentry; his diary has him "surviving grenade attacks only by good luck", according to New Grove Dictionary. After the armistice he returned to Frankfurt and the Rebner Quartet.

In 1921, Hindemith founded the Amar Quartet, playing viola, and extensively toured Europe with an emphasis on contemporary music. His younger brother Rudolf was the original cellist.

Das Marienleben
the opening of the song cycle

As a composer, he became a major advocate of the Neue Sachlichkeit (New Objectivity) style of music in the 1920s, with compositions such as Kammermusik. Reminiscent of Bach's Brandenburg Concertos, they include works with viola and viola d'amore as solo instruments in a neo-Bachian spirit. In 1922, some of his pieces were played in the International Society for Contemporary Music festival at Salzburg, which first brought him to the attention of an international audience. The next year, he composed the song cycle Das Marienleben (The Life of Mary) and began to work as an organizer of the Donaueschingen Festival, where he programmed works by several avant-garde composers, including Anton Webern and Arnold Schoenberg. In 1927 he was appointed Professor at the Berliner Hochschule für Musik in Berlin. Hindemith wrote the music for Hans Richter's 1928 avant-garde film Ghosts Before Breakfast (Vormittagsspuk) and also acted in the film; the score and original film were later burned by the Nazis. In 1929, Hindemith played the solo part in the premiere of William Walton's viola concerto, after Lionel Tertis, for whom it was written, turned it down.

On 15 May 1924, Hindemith married the actress and singer Gertrud (Johanna Gertrude) Rottenberg (1900–1967). The marriage was childless.

The Nazis' relationship to Hindemith's music was complicated. Some condemned his music as "degenerate" (largely based on his early, sexually charged operas such as Sancta Susanna). In December 1934, during a speech at the Berlin Sports Palace, Germany's Minister of Propaganda Joseph Goebbels publicly denounced Hindemith as an "atonal noisemaker". The Nazis banned his music in October 1936, and he was subsequently included in the 1938 Entartete Musik (Degenerate Music) exhibition in Düsseldorf. Other officials working in Nazi Germany, though, thought that he might provide Germany with an example of a modern German composer, as, by this time, he was writing music based in tonality, with frequent references to folk music. The conductor Wilhelm Furtwängler's defence of Hindemith, published in 1934, takes this line. The controversy around his work continued throughout the thirties, with Hindemith falling in and out of favour with the Nazis.

During the 1930s, Hindemith visited Cairo and also Ankara several times. He accepted an invitation from the Turkish government to oversee the creation of a music school in Ankara in 1935, after Goebbels had pressured him to request an indefinite leave of absence from the Berlin Academy. In Turkey, he was the leading figure of a new music pedagogy in the era of president Kemal Atatürk. His deputy was Eduard Zuckmayer. Hindemith led the reorganization of Turkish music education and the early efforts to establish the Turkish State Opera and Ballet. He did not stay in Turkey as long as many other émigrés, but he greatly influenced Turkish musical life; the Ankara State Conservatory owes much to his efforts. Young Turkish musicians regarded Hindemith as a "real master", and he was appreciated and greatly respected.

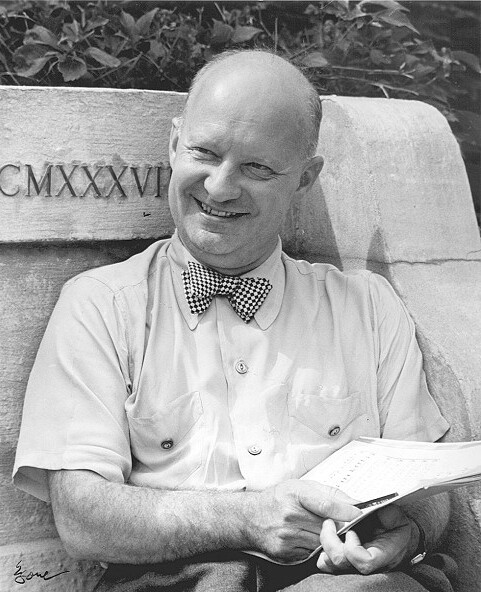
Hindemith during the 1940s

Toward the end of the 1930s, Hindemith made several tours of America as a viola and viola d'amore soloist. In 1937 he was one of the founding faculty at Berkshire Music Center at Tanglewood, established by Serge Koussevitzky as an institute for advanced music study and the summer home of the Boston Symphony Orchestra. One of his students there was Walter Franklin Anderson.

He emigrated to Switzerland in 1938, partly because his wife was of part-Jewish ancestry; "it was primarily Hindemith's conflict with the artistic policies of the Third Reich, however, that determined his decision to leave."

At the same time that he was codifying his musical language, Hindemith's teaching and compositions began to be affected by his theories, according to critics such as Ernest Ansermet. Arriving in the U.S. in 1940, he taught primarily at Yale University, where he founded the Yale Collegium Musicum. At Yale, he required his students to study composition and theory from his pedagogical work, The Craft of Musical Composition, among other educational texts. Because of his commitments outside the university, the number of composers who studied under Hindemith was small. According to Luther Noss's A History of the Yale School of Music 1855–1970, Hindemith taught for a little over ten years, teaching 400 students, of whom 46 earned degrees, mostly in music theory. He had such notable students as Lukas Foss, Graham George, Andrew Hill, Norman Dello Joio, Mel Powell, Yehudi Wyner, Harold Shapero, Hans Otte, Ruth Schönthal, Samuel Adler, Frank Lewin, Leonard Sarason, Fenno Heath, Mitch Leigh, and George Roy Hill. Hindemith also taught at the University at Buffalo, Cornell University, and Wells College. During this time he gave the Charles Eliot Norton Lectures at Harvard, from which the book A Composer's World (1952) was extracted. Hindemith had a long friendship with Erich Katz, whose compositions were influenced by him. Also among Hindemith's students were the future rocket scientist Wernher von Braun and the composers Franz Reizenstein, Harald Genzmer, Oskar Sala, Arnold Cooke, Robert Strassburg, and dozens of other notables.

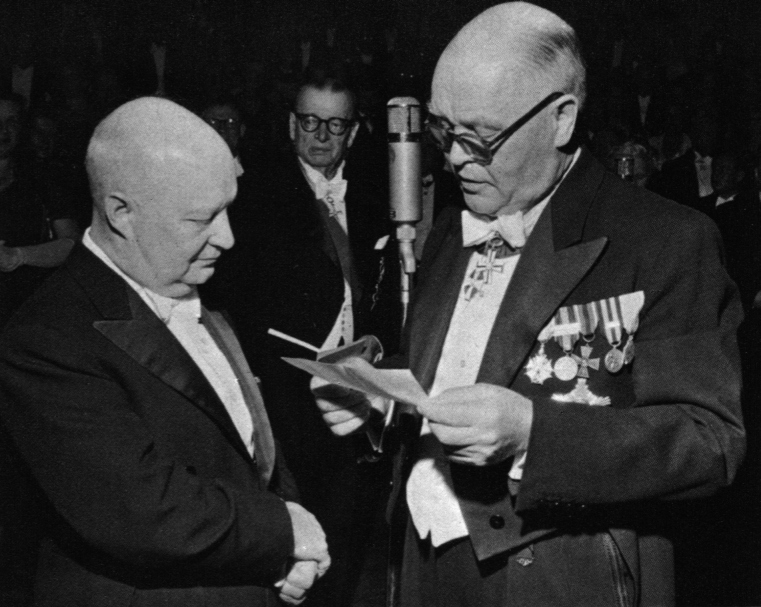
Hindemith (left) received the Wihuri Sibelius Prize in 1955 from Antti Wihuri.

Hindemith became a U.S. citizen in 1946, but returned to Europe in 1953, living in Zürich and teaching at the university there until he retired from teaching in 1957. Toward the end of his life he began to conduct more and made numerous recordings, mostly of his own music.

In 1954, an anonymous critic for Opera magazine, having attended a performance of Hindemith's Neues vom Tage, wrote: "Mr Hindemith is no virtuoso conductor, but he does possess an extraordinary knack of making performers understand how his own music is supposed to go."

Hindemith received the Wihuri Sibelius Prize in 1955. He was awarded the Balzan Prize in 1962 "for the wealth, extent and variety of his work, which is among the most valid in contemporary music, and which contains masterpieces of opera, symphonic and chamber music."

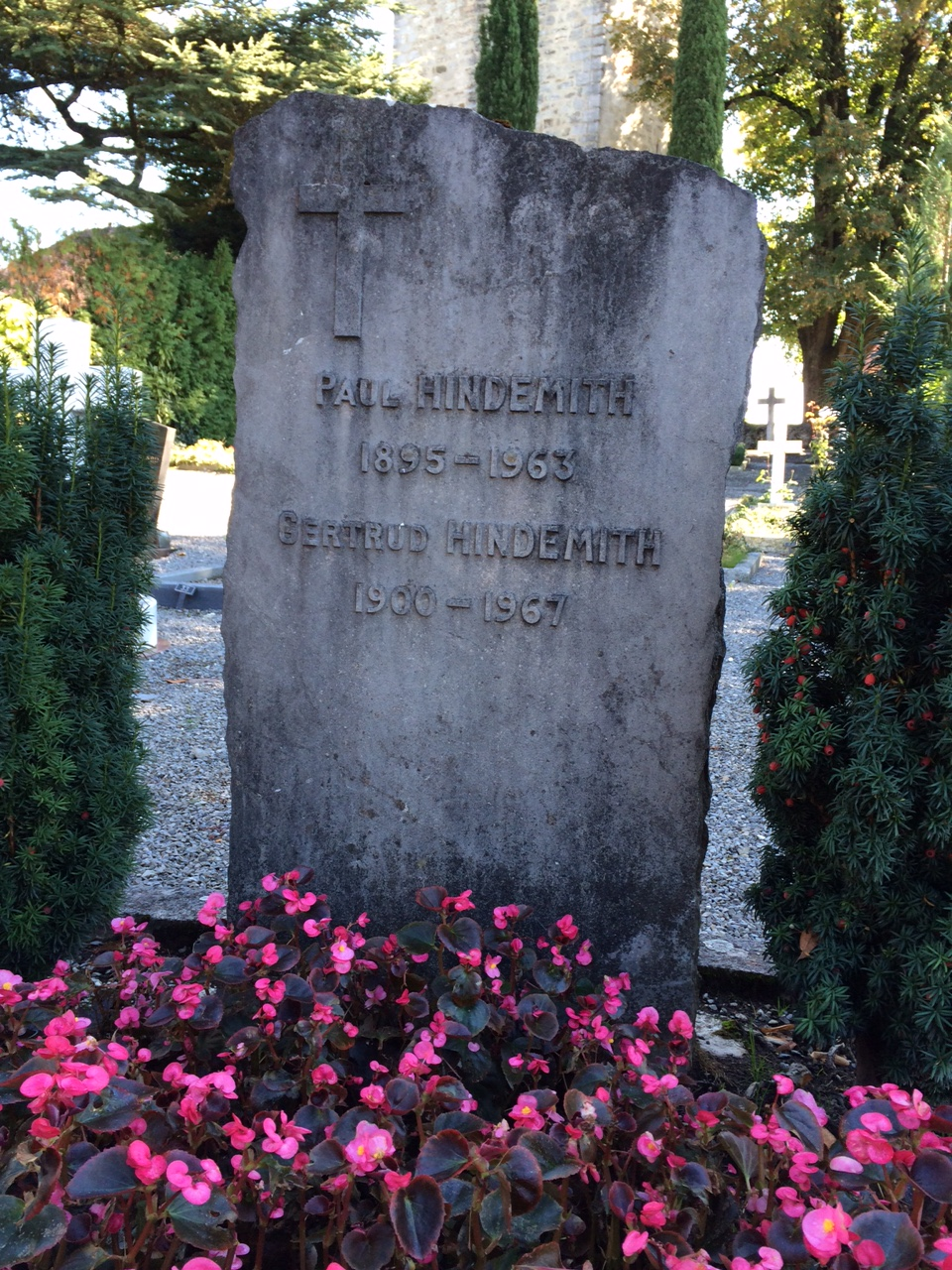
Swiss gravesite

Despite a prolonged decline in his physical health, Hindemith composed almost until his death. He died in Frankfurt of pancreatitis, aged 68. He and his wife were buried in the cemetery in Blonay - Saint-Légier (formerly La Chiésaz), Vaud, Switzerland.

== Music ==
Hindemith is among the most significant German composers of his time. His early works are in a late Romantic idiom, and he later produced Expressionist works, rather in the style of the early Schoenberg, before developing a leaner, contrapuntally complex style in the 1920s. This style has been described as neoclassical but is quite different from the works by Igor Stravinsky labeled with that term, owing more to the contrapuntal language of Johann Sebastian Bach and Max Reger than the Classical clarity of Mozart.

Kleine Kammermusik
performed by the Soni Ventorum Wind Quintet

The new style can be heard in the series of works called Kammermusik (Chamber Music) from 1922 to 1927. Each of these pieces is written for a different small instrumental ensemble, many of them very unusual. Kammermusik No. 6, for example, is a concerto for the viola d'amore, an instrument that has not been in wide use since the baroque period, but which Hindemith himself played. He continued to write for unusual groups of instruments throughout his life, producing (for example) a trio for viola, heckelphone and piano (1928), seven trios for three trautoniums (1930), a sonata for double bass, and a concerto for trumpet, bassoon, and strings (both in 1949).

In the 1930s Hindemith began to write less for chamber music groups, and more for large orchestral forces. He wrote his opera Mathis der Maler, based on the life of the painter Matthias Grünewald, in 1933–1935. This opera is rarely staged, though the New York City Opera did so in 1995. In 2021, Naxos released a 2012 Theater an der Wien production on DVD. The opera combines the neoclassicism of Hindemith's earlier works with folk song. As a preliminary stage of composing the opera, Hindemith wrote a purely instrumental symphony also called Mathis der Maler, which is one of his most frequently performed works. In the opera, some portions of the symphony appear as instrumental interludes; others are elaborated in vocal scenes.

Hindemith wrote Gebrauchsmusik (Music for Use)—compositions intended to have a social or political purpose and sometimes written to be played by amateurs. The concept was inspired by Bertolt Brecht. An example of this is Hindemith's Trauermusik (Funeral Music), written in January 1936. He was preparing the London premiere of his viola concerto Der Schwanendreher when he heard news of the death of George V. He quickly wrote Trauermusik for solo viola and string orchestra in tribute to the late king, and the premiere was given the day after the king's death. Other examples of Hindemith's Gebrauchsmusik include:

- the Plöner Musiktage (1932), a series of pieces written for a day of community music-making in the city of Plön, culminating in an evening concert by grammar-school students and teachers.
- a Scherzo for viola and cello (1934), written in several hours during a series of recording sessions as a "filler" for an unexpected blank side of a 78 rpm album and recorded immediately upon its completion.
- Wir bauen eine Stadt (We're Building a City), an opera for eight-year-olds (1930).

Hindemith's most popular work, both on record and in the concert hall, is probably the Symphonic Metamorphosis of Themes by Carl Maria von Weber, written in 1943. It takes melodies from various works by Carl Maria von Weber, mainly piano duets, but also one from the overture to his incidental music for Turandot (Op. 37/J. 75), and transforms and adapts them so that each movement of the piece is based on one theme.

In 1951, Hindemith completed his Symphony in B-flat for Band. Scored for concert band, it was written for the U.S. Army Band "Pershing's Own". Hindemith premiered it with that band on 5 April that year. Its second performance was given by the Boulder Symphonic Band at the University of Colorado, conducted by Hugh McMillan. The piece is representative of Hindemith's late works, exhibiting strong contrapuntal lines throughout, and is a cornerstone of the band repertoire. He recorded it in stereo with members of the Philharmonia Orchestra for EMI in 1956.

=== Musical system ===
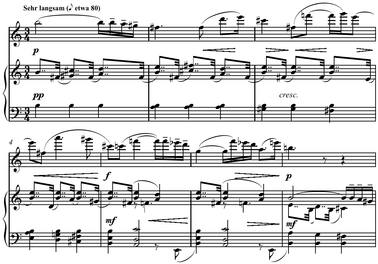
Opening of 2nd movement of Hindemith's Flute Sonata (1936)

Most of Hindemith's music employs a unique system that is tonal but non-diatonic, often notated without a traditional key signature. Like most tonal music, it is centred on a tonic and modulates from one tonal centre to another, but it "attempts ... the free use of all the twelve tones of the chromatic scale", rather than relying on a diatonic scale as a restricted subset of these notes. He even rewrote some of his music after developing this system. One of the core features of Hindemith's system is a ranking of all musical intervals of the 12-tone equally tempered scale, from the most consonant to the most dissonant. He classifies chords in six categories, on the basis of dissonance, whether they contain a tritone, and whether they clearly suggest a root or tonal centre. His philosophy also encompassed melody—he strove for melodies that do not clearly outline major or minor triads.

In the late 1930s Hindemith wrote an instructional treatise in three volumes, The Craft of Musical Composition, which lays out this system in great detail. He also advocated this system as a means of understanding and analyzing the harmonic structure of other music, claiming that it has a broader reach than the traditional Roman numeral approach to chords (an approach strongly tied to diatonic scales). In the final chapter of Book 1, Hindemith seeks to illustrate the wide-ranging relevance and applicability of his system, analyzing musical examples from the medieval to the contemporary. These analyses include the early Gregorian melody Dies irae, compositions by Guillaume de Machaut, J. S. Bach, Richard Wagner, Igor Stravinsky, Arnold Schoenberg, and a composition of his own.

Hindemith's 1942 piano work Ludus Tonalis contains twelve fugues, in the manner of Johann Sebastian Bach, using traditional devices like inversion, diminution, augmentation, retrogradation, stretto, etc. Each fugue is connected by an interlude to the next, during which the music moves from the key of the last to its successor. The order of the keys follows Hindemith's ranking of musical intervals around the tonal center of C.

Another traditional aspect of classical music that Hindemith retains is the idea of dissonance resolving to consonance. Much of Hindemith's music begins in consonant territory, progresses into dissonant tension, and resolves in full, consonant chords and cadences. This is especially apparent in his Concert Music for Strings and Brass (1930).

=== Reputation ===
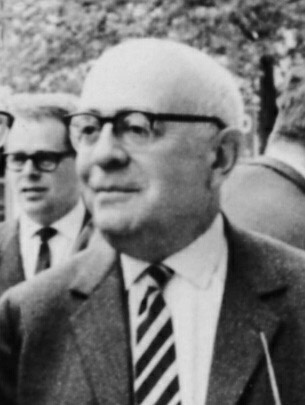
Theodor W. Adorno's criticisms of Hindemith at times "verged on the apoplectic".

While critics during his lifetime were divided, Hindemith was generally characterized in the mainstream as a "modern master" of the likes of Bartók, Stravinsky, and Shostakovich, and his theoretical contributions were appraised highly. Leonard Bernstein called Hindemith "a worthy successor to the long line of great German composers that included Bach, Beethoven, Brahms, and Wagner" and perhaps even "the last of that traditional line". Hindemith's reputation as a composer and theorist declined in his later years, and particularly after his death.

Hindemith's reputational decline can be attributed at least partly to a lack of "champions" among his pupils. Compared to theorists such as Schenker, Piston, Carter, and Schoenberg, very few of Hindemith's pupils achieved international success. Even those who assumed prominent academic positions, such as Howard Boatwright, generally declined to champion Hindemith's compositional or theoretical legacy. His Unterweisung techniques came to be seen as dogmatic and conservative in the 1950s, especially as appreciation of Schoenberg's twelve-tone system, serialism, and Schenkerian analysis increased. Perhaps the biggest blows to Hindemith's reputation came in the 1960s from composers and scholars associated with the Darmstadt School, which discarded the use of his works in instruction in favor of serialist works by Luigi Nono, Pierre Boulez, and Karlheinz Stockhausen. Boulez particularly disliked Hindemith and refused to conduct his works.

Theodor W. Adorno was a noted and intransigent opponent of Hindemith. His views on Hindemith, which were initially favorable but had soured by the early 1930s, are laid out in his polemical essay "Ad Vocem Hindemith", published in 1968 in a compilation of critical writings from the 1920s to the 1960s. In the 1920s, Adorno praised Hindemith's early, scandalous works such as Sancta Susanna, but his movement toward Neue Sachlichkeit alienated Adorno for its apparent conservatism and lack of experimentation. Adorno's criticisms of Hindemith's theoretical works beginning with Unterweisung "verged on the apoplectic", drawing direct comparisons between what he saw as the "technician" Hindemith's "moderated modernity" and the cultural policies of the Third Reich. Adorno was not the first or only critic to affiliate Hindemith's perceived conservatism with fascist ideology: as early as 1939, the modernist Ernst Krenek said there was "an unbroken line" leading from Hindemith's works to the fanfares of the Hitler Youth.

Denunciation of Hindemith's perceived departure from (if not betrayal of) radicalism and experimentation in the 1930s continued in contemporary criticism. In 2009, Richard Taruskin fiercely criticized Hindemith's work in Switzerland and the U.S., particularly his "disingenuous" reflections on and modifications of his earlier works after he entered exile.

In the early 1980s, John Rockwell wrote that Hindemith's works had "fallen into obscurity", with the exception of some of his sonatas and a few of his "splashier" works like Mathis der Maler and Symphonic Metamorphoses. In 1988, Lionel Salter wrote that Hindemith's reputation was "recovering", but critics still generally agree that Hindemith lost his canonical status.

== Awards and honors ==
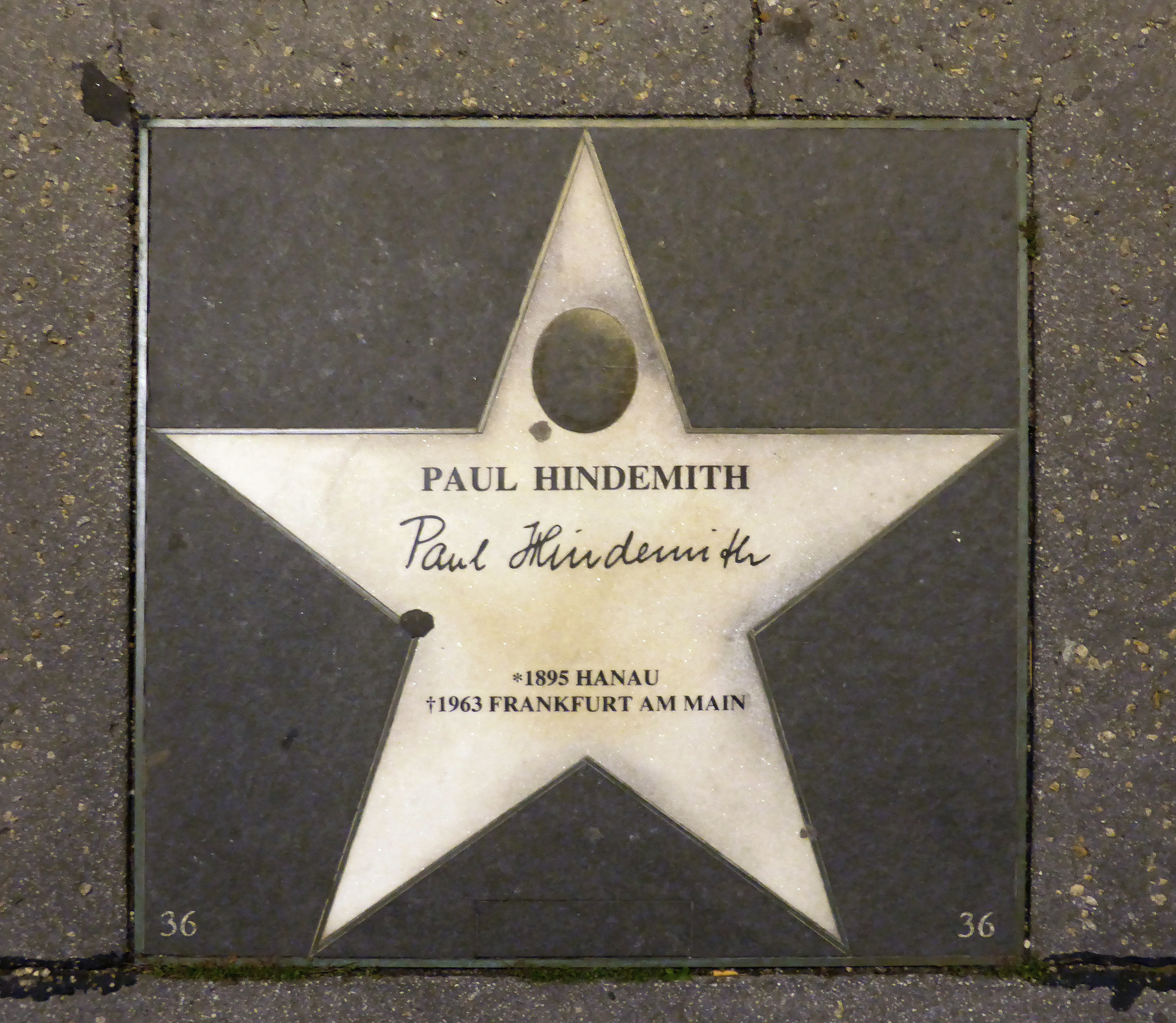
Walk of Fame, Vienna

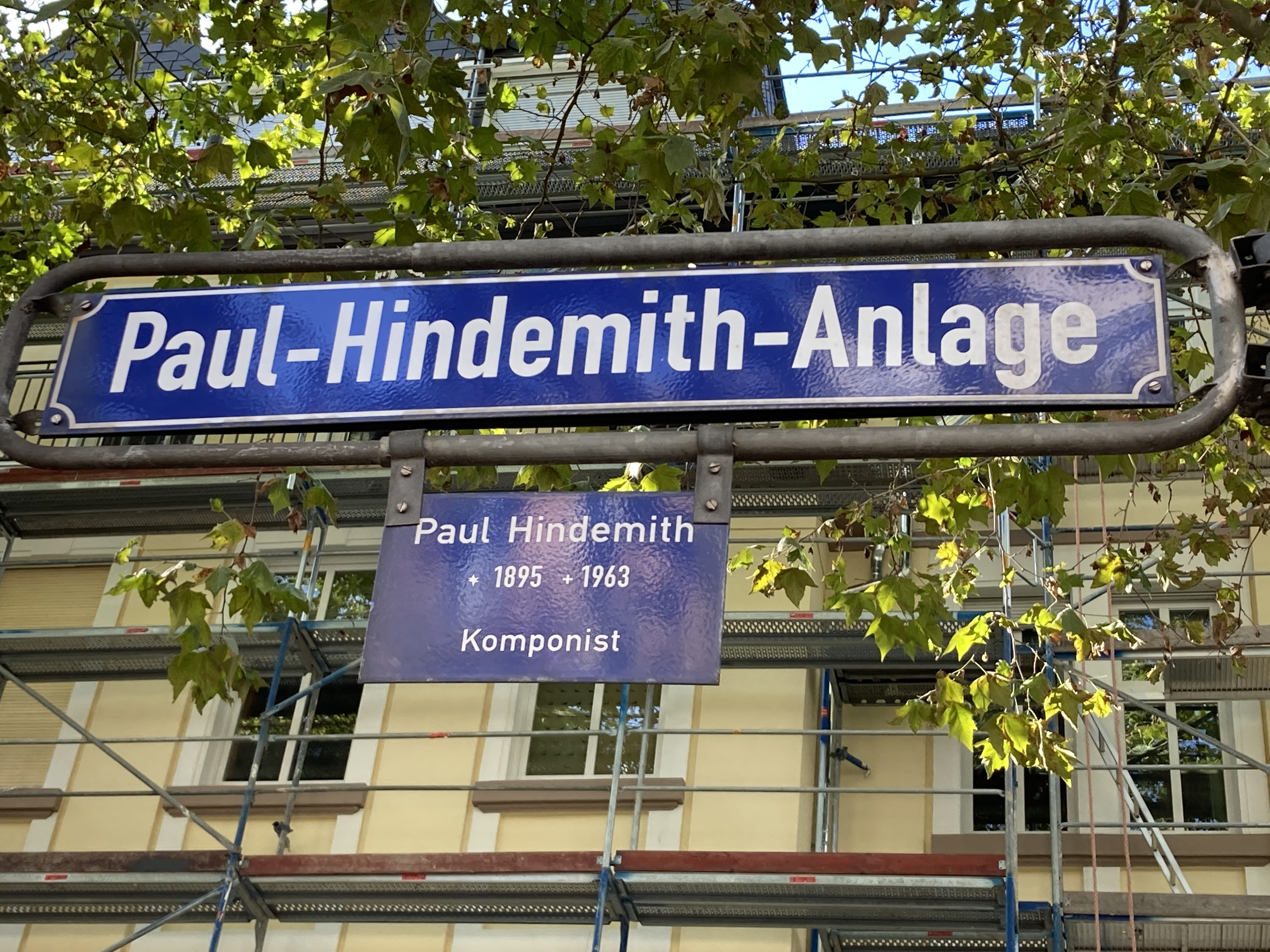
Paul Hindemith Park, Frankfurt

- Howland Memorial Prize (1940), awarded by Yale University
- Elected to American Academy of Arts and Sciences (1940)
- Bach Prize of the Free and Hanseatic City of Hamburg (1951)
- Order Pour le Mérite (1952)
- Wihuri Sibelius Prize (1955)
- Goethe Plaque of the City of Frankfurt (1955)
- Elected to the American Philosophical Society (1962)
- Balzan Prize (1963)
- 5157 Hindemith (1973), asteroid discovered and named for him

=== Honorary doctorates ===
- Philadelphia Academy of Music (1945)
- Columbia University (1948)
- Goethe University Frankfurt (1949)
- FU Berlin (1950)
- Oxford University (1954)

== Pedagogical writings ==
Hindemith's complete set of instructional books, in possible educational order:

- Elementary Training for Musicians. London: Schott; New York: Associated Music Publishers, 1946. ISBN 978-0-901938-16-9
- A Concentrated Course in Traditional Harmony

Book 1: With Emphasis on Exercises and a Minimum of Rules, revised edition. New York: Schott, 1968. ISBN 978-0-901938-42-8
Book 2: Exercises for Advanced Students, translated by Arthur Mendel. New York: Schott, 1964. ISBN 978-0-901938-43-5

- The Craft of Musical Composition

Book 1: Theoretical Part, translated by Arthur Mendel. London: Schott; New York: Associated Music Publishers, 1942. ISBN 978-0-901938-30-5
Book 2: Exercises in Two-Part Writing, translated by Otto Ortmann. London: Schott; New York: Associated Music Publishers, 1941. ISBN 978-0-901938-41-1
Book 3: Exercises in Three-Part Writing, translated by John Colman. London: Schott; New York: Associated Music Publishers, 2024. ISBN 978-3-7957-1605-9

== Recordings ==
Hindemith was a prolific composer. He conducted some of his own music in a series of recordings for EMI with the Philharmonia Orchestra and for Deutsche Grammophon with the Berlin Philharmonic Orchestra, which have been digitally remastered and released on CD. The Violin Concerto was also recorded by Decca/London, with the composer conducting the London Symphony Orchestra and David Oistrakh as soloist. Everest Records issued a recording of Hindemith's postwar When Lilacs Last in the Dooryard Bloom'd ("A Requiem for Those We Love") on LP, conducted by Hindemith. A stereo recording of Hindemith conducting the requiem with the New York Philharmonic Orchestra, with Louise Parker and George London as soloists, was made for Columbia Records in 1963 and later issued on CD. He also appeared on television as a guest conductor of the Chicago Symphony Orchestra's nationally syndicated "Music from Chicago" series; the performances have been released by VAI on home video. A complete collection of Hindemith's orchestral music was recorded by German and Australian orchestras, all conducted by Werner Andreas Albert and released on the CPO label.

== Hindemith and George Balanchine ==
George Balanchine commissioned a piece for piano and strings from Hindemith, apparently at least in part for Balanchine (a skilled pianist) to play during musical get-togethers with friends. Hindemith may have based some of the material on music he wrote for an abandoned project with the choreographer Léonid Massine. The music received its public premiere in Boston in 1944, with Lukas Foss as soloist. In 1946, Balanchine's ballet to the score premiered as part of the inaugural program of Ballet Society; the ballet was initially presented in elaborate costumes, but since 1951 has been performed in practice clothes.

In 1978, the New York City Ballet premiered Kammermusik No. 2, a ballet by Balanchine to the second of Hindemith's 1920s Kammermusik series.

== Hindemithon Festival ==
An annual festival of Hindemith's music has been held at William Paterson University in Wayne, New Jersey, from 2003 through at least 2017. It features student, staff, and professional musicians performing a range of Hindemith's works.

== See also ==
- Hindemith Prize of the City of Hanau
- Hindemith Prize of the Schleswig-Holstein Musik Festival
- Music written in all major or minor keys
