= Der Karneval in Rom =

Illustration of the operetta in the Austrian magazine Der Floh by Albert Robida (1873)

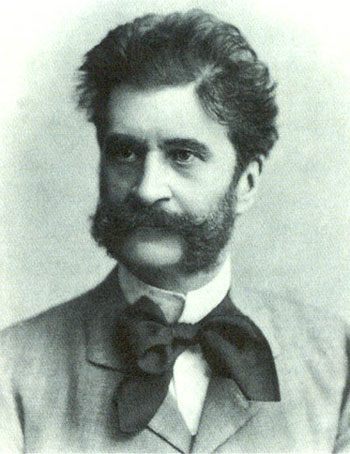
Johann Strauss II

Der Karneval in Rom (The Carnival in Rome) —also known as Karneval in Rom— is an operetta in three acts composed by Johann Strauss II to a libretto by Josef Braun, Richard Genée and Maximilian Steiner. It was Strauss' second operetta and based on Victorien Sardou's 1861 comedy Piccolino. The work premiered on 1 March 1873 at the Theater an der Wien.

== Roles ==
Role	Voice type	Premiere cast, 1 March 1873 (Conductor: Johann Strauss II)
Marie, a girl from the country	soprano	Marie Geistinger
Arthur Bryk, a painter	tenor	Albin Swoboda, Sr.
Count Falconi	baritone	Carl Adolf Friese
Countess Falconi	soprano	Caroline Charles-Hirsch
Robert Hesse, a painter and Arthur's friend	baritone	Alfred Schreiber
Benvenuto Rafaeli, a painter and Arthur's friend	tenor	Jani Szika
Donna Sofronia, head of a ladies school	contralto	
Therese, a young bride	soprano	Mme Charles-Rothier
Franz, a young groom	tenor	
Toni	tenor	
Sepp	tenor	
Martin	tenor	
