= Marie Geistinger =

Austrian actress and operatic soprano

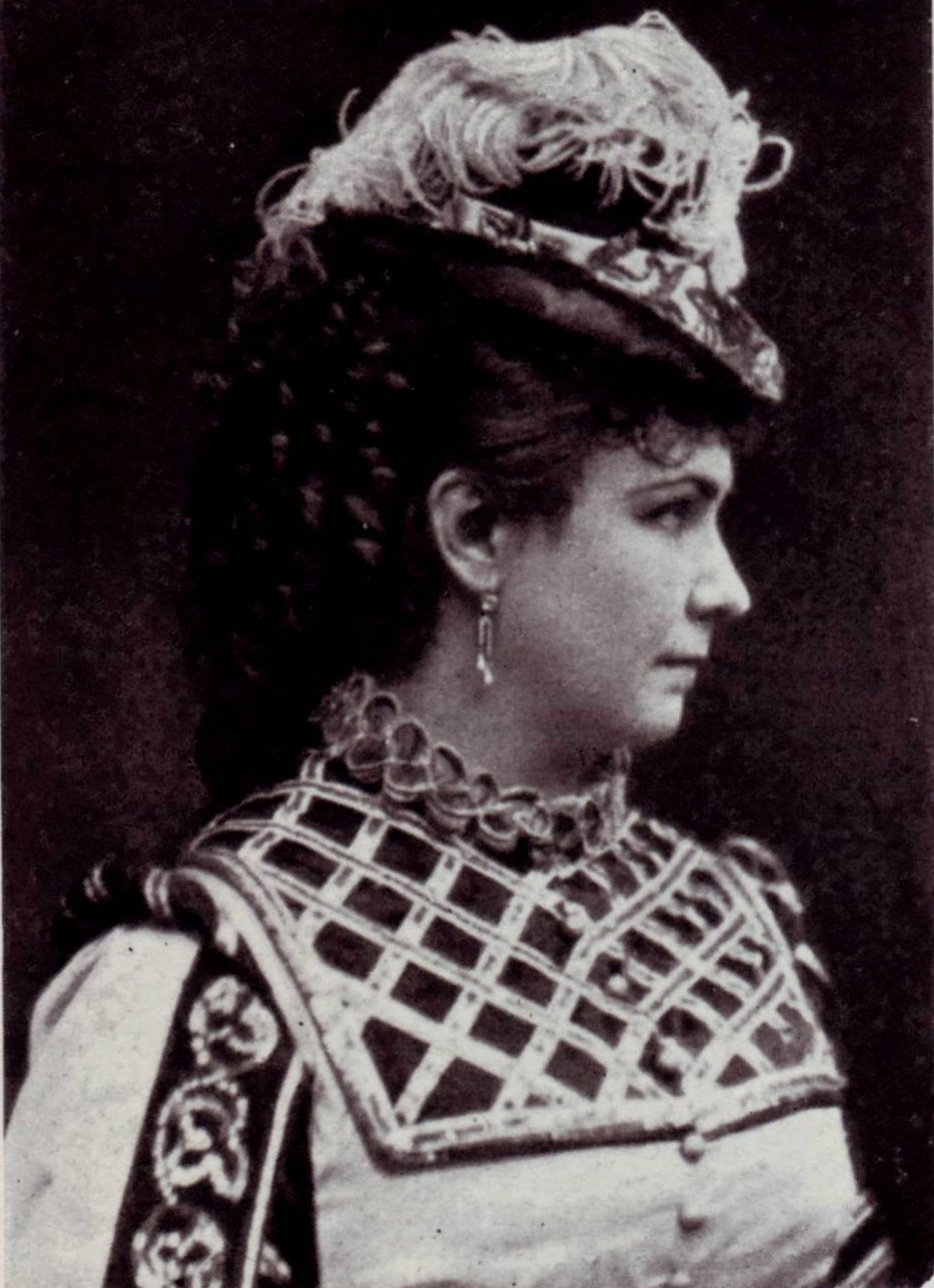
Marie Geistinger as Boulotte (1866)

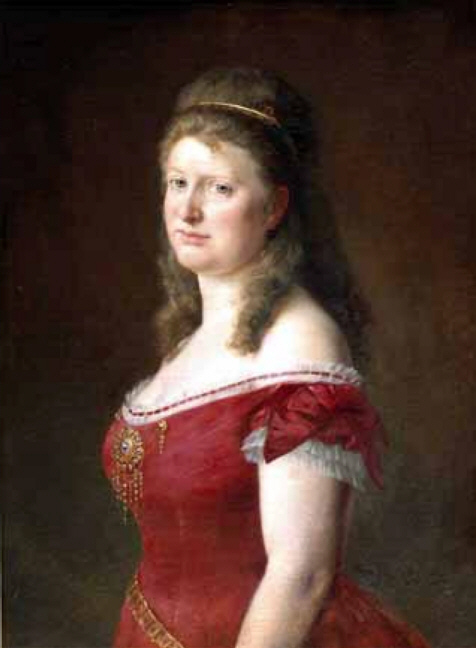
Portrait of Marie Geistinger by August Wilhelm Rösler

Marie Charlotte Cäcilie Geistinger (1836–1903) was an Austrian actress and operatic soprano, known as the "Queen of Operetta". She frequently appeared in works by Jacques Offenbach, Johann Strauss II and Franz von Suppé. She achieved particular acclaim for performing Rosalinda in the première of Die Fledermaus at the Theater an der Wien in 1874. In 1881, her debut at the Thalia Theatre in New York was well received.

== Early life ==
Born in Graz on 26 July 1836, Geistinger was the daughter of the Russian court actors Nikolaus Geistinger, an opera singer, and his wife Charlotte, who was the granddaughter of the Brunswick court actor Karl Grassmann. Well educated, she was given a sound introduction to music by K. M. Wolf in Vienna. From 1844, she appeared in children's roles in Graz. She made her official début in August 1850 at the Max-Schaiger Theatre in Munich.

== Career ==
Apart from appearing in the title role of Johann Wilhelm Christern's Die falsche Pepita at Vienna's Theater in der Josefstadt in 1852, she spent the next dozen years abroad, acting and singing on the stages of Berlin, Hamburg and Riga. In 1865, Friedrich Strampfer, the director of Vienna's Theater an der Wien, invited her to return to Austria to star in the title role of Jacques Offenbach's operetta La Belle Hélène. Offenbach commented that he had never seen a better performance of the role and that she was the greatest operetta performer he had seen. Thanks to this success, she went on to take leading roles in other works by Offenbach including Barbe-bleue, Coscoletto, Les bergers, La Grande-Duchesse de Gérolstein, Le Corsaire noir, Fantasio, Madame l'archiduc and Geneviève de Brabant. She also performed in other operettas, including von Suppé's Die schöne Galathee. In the early 1870s, Geistinger was largely responsible for the success of Strauss's Viennese operettas, starring in the premières of Indigo und die vierzig Räuber (1871), Der Karneval in Rom (1873), Die Fledermaus (1874, in the role of Rosalinda), and Cagliostro in Wien (1875), in which she created the role of Lorenza Feliciani in 1875. She also acted in plays, taking the role of Leni in Alois Berla's Drei Paar Schuhe and that of Anna Birkmeier in Ludwig Anzengruber's Der Pfarrer von Kirchfeld.

In 1869, still continuing to perform on the stage, she joined Maximilian Steiner as co-director of the Theater an der Wien. After the theatre ran into financial difficulties following the stock market crash of 1875, she gave up her management role, increasingly accepting the higher fees she received for guest performances at the Wiener Stadttheater. There she played the title role in Friedrich Schiller's Mary Stuart, Queen Elizabeth I in Heinrich Laube's Graf Essex, the title role in Franz Grillparzer's Sappho, and Beatrice in Shakespeare's Much Ado about Nothing. In the late 1870s, she was engaged by a theatre in Leipzig, where she performed in dramas and tragedies. In 1880, she returned to Vienna's Theater an der Wien for a short period, successfully performing in Offenbach's German versions of Madame Favart (in the title role) and La fille du tambour-major as Stella. She also appeared as Lotti Grießmeyer in Ludwig Held's Die Näherin.

On an invitation from the American theatre manager and impresario Gustav Amberg, she moved to New York, where she made her début at the Thalia Theater on 5 January 1881, receiving the same enthusiastic reception as years earlier in Vienna. She performed in the United States in theatres across the country for the next three years, appearing in all her most successful roles in operetta and drama. After she moved to the Germania Theatre in 1883, her Austrian rival Josefine Gallmeyer was engaged by the Thalia, but poor health soon forced her to return to Europe. Gallmeyer had excelled in an extensive repertoire, playing leading parts in Charles Lecocq's La petite mademoiselle, Offenbach's La Vie parisienne, von Suppé's Leichte Kavallerie, Zehn Mädchen und kein Mann, die Afrikareise and Donna Juanita, Carl Millöcker's Der Bettelstudent, Das verwunschene Schloss and Apajune, der Wassermann, and Hervé's Lili.

On her return to Europe, Geistinger played in Austrian and German theatres, appearing in her most successful roles. After retiring in 1889, financial difficulties forced her to return to the United States for three additional seasons in 1891, 1896 and 1899. She last appeared on the stage in 1900.

== Later life ==
Geistinger spent her later years in Klagenfurt, where she died on 29 September 1903. Her obituary in the Neue Freie Presse referred to her as the most important operetta singer of her times. She is buried in a tomb of honour in Vienna's Central Cemetery.
