= Maximilian Steiner =

Austrian actor and theater director and manager

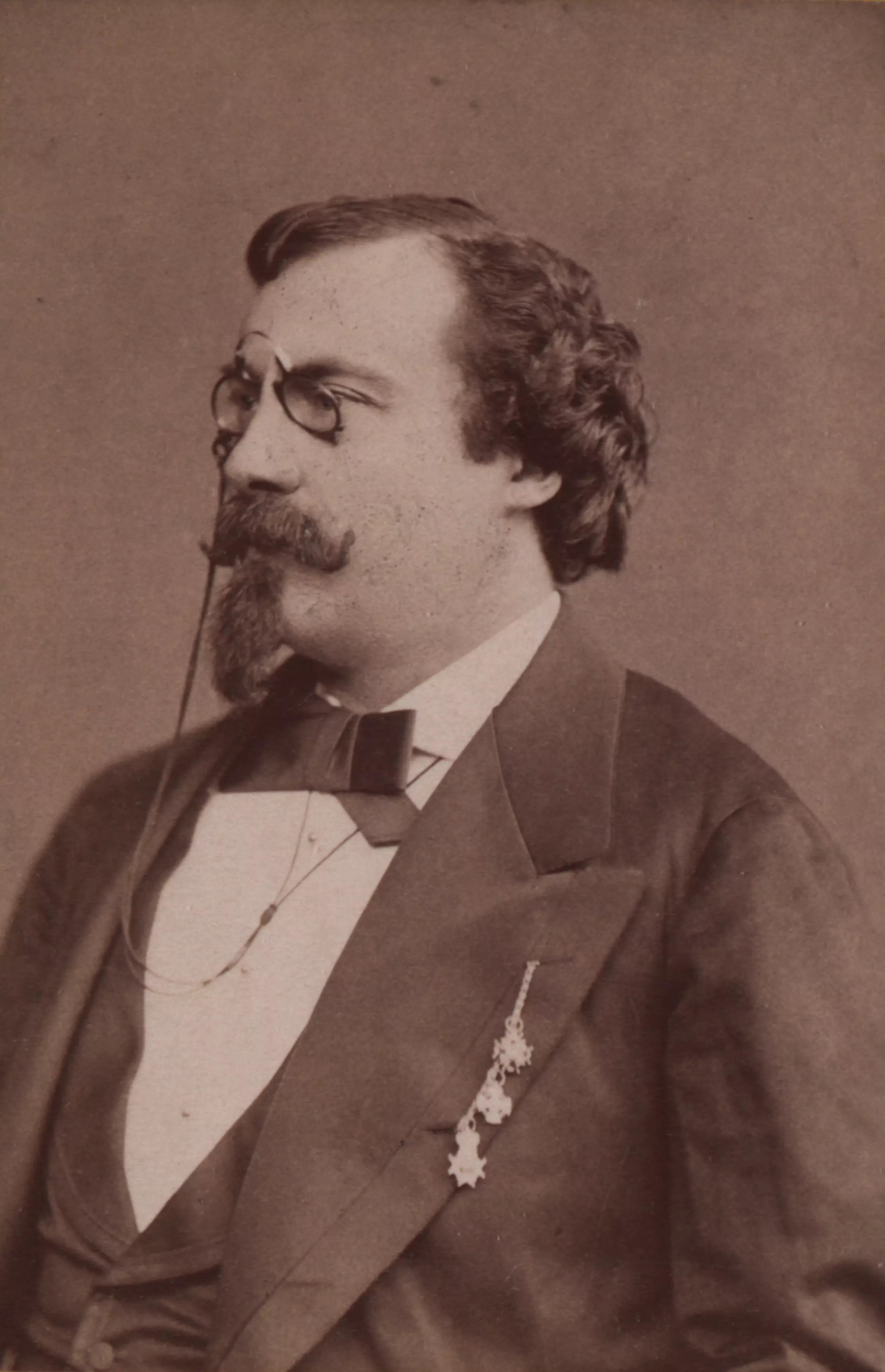
- Steiner in 1875
- Born: 27 August 1830; Ofen
- Died: 29 May 1880 (aged 49)
- Occupations: Actor, theater manager
- Known for: Managing the Theater an der Wien
- Spouse: Rosa Kollinsky
- Children: 2
- Relatives: Max Steiner (gradnson)

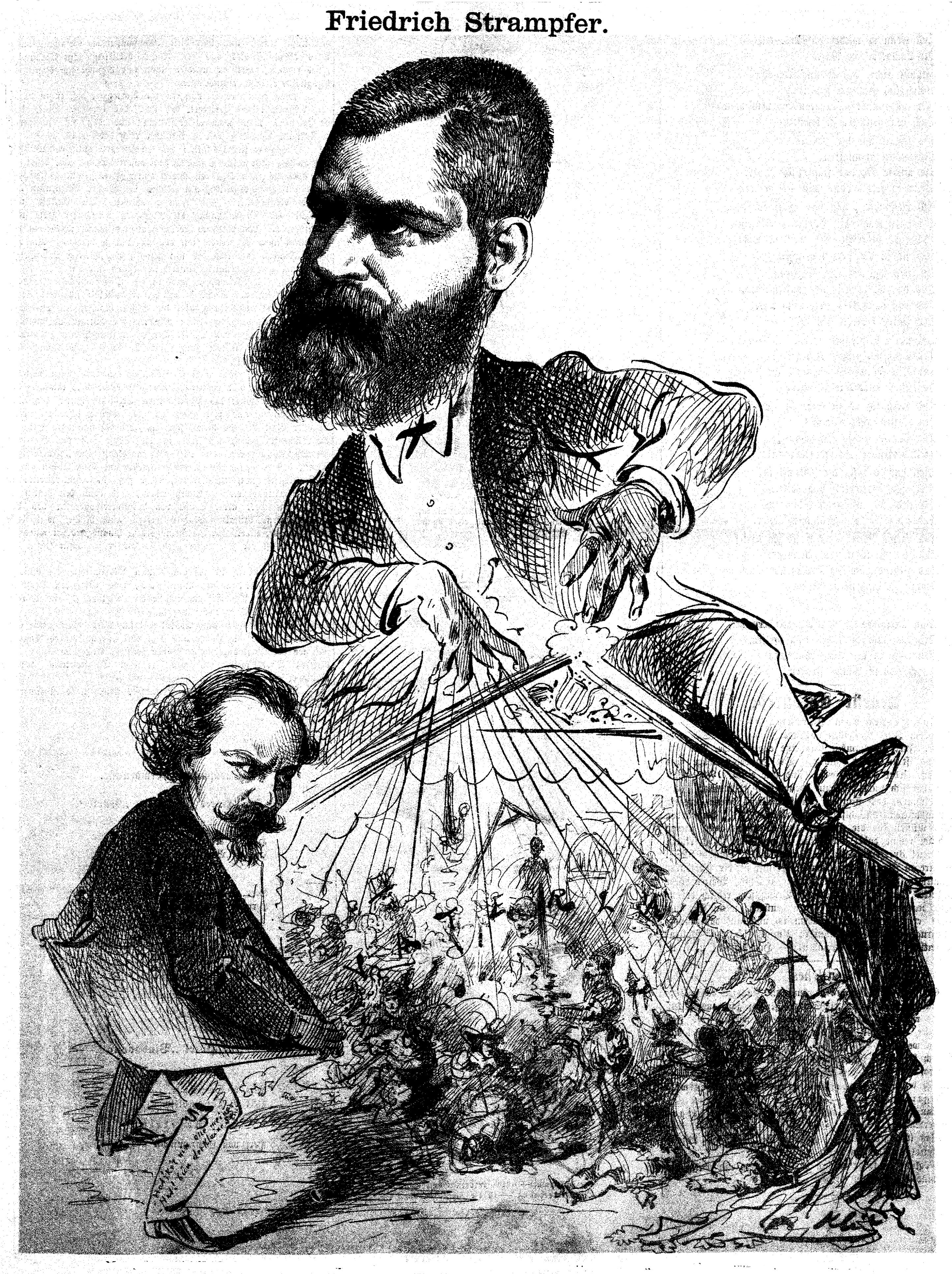
Cartoon of Maximilian Steiner (bottom left) with his boss Friedrich Strampfer (top). By Karel Klíč, 1869.

Maximilian Steiner (27 August 1830 – 29 May 1880) was an Austrian actor and theater director and manager. He is known particularly for his leadership of Vienna's Theater an der Wien from 1869 to 1880, a period during which the theater reduced the importance of folk plays (dialect drama) and was prominent in developing and promoting the fashion of a Viennese style of operetta. He was the grandfather of Max Steiner.

== Life and career ==
Steiner was born in Ofen, now a part of Budapest in Hungary, then a part of the Austrian Empire. In the early 1850s, he began work in the stage crew of the theatre in Temeswar (now in Romania). In 1854, he was engaged by the theater director Friedrich Strampfer as an actor in the German-language theater. He continued to act in that theater and others in the region till 1862, gaining both acting and directing experience, when he followed Strampfer to Vienna, where Steiner became secretary (an executive role) in the Theater an der Wien. Strampfer gave him considerable leeway to develop his own career, and in August 1869 Steiner became manager after Strampfer stepped down. Till 1875 Steiner was co-manager with the actress and singer Marie Geistinger; together, they "set a tone for the repertoire that lasted until the end of the century," despite criticism from the conservative press. When Geistinger left for Berlin, Steiner led the theater on his own, with help from his sons Franz and Gabor, till his death in 1880. Steiner's business acuity helped the Theater stay open after the stock market crash in 1873, but he did lose control for several months in 1877 due to another set of financial difficulties; he gained control again later in the same year with the help of friends and other backers.

Although he and Geistinger came to emphasize operetta more and more, Steiner still built the theater's seasons by emphasizing variety: the typical fare included folk plays, burlesques with music, and operetta. He gradually phased out spoken-word dramas, contributing fundamentally to the Viennese operetta boom that continued till well into the twentieth century. He produced both well-proven and new stage works by Offenbach but also discovered young talent such as the playwright Ludwig Anzengruber, the last prominent author of folk plays, and the composer Carl Millöcker, who became the Theater's Kapellmeister in 1869.

When the first wife of Johann Strauss, jr., brought some of the composer's musical sketches to Steiner, he took on himself responsibility for encouraging Strauss to write operetta. As it happened, Strauss, piqued by the Viennese successes of Jacques Offenbach, had already started working on an operetta, a project that fell through when it was discovered that his intended lead, Josefine Gallmeyer, was unavailable. Steiner then collaborated with Strauss on Indigo and the Forty Thieves, which premiered on 10 February 1871 and for which Steiner wrote the libretto. Strauss's second operetta, Die Fledermaus (1874) became a fixture of German-language theaters and has remained in the canon of operetta to this day. The initial production starred Geistinger as Rosalinde. Second and third productions followed in 1875 and 1876. The latter is notable for introducing, as Dr. Falke, Alexander Girardi, who stayed with the Theater's company for twenty two years and was a central figure in many successful operetta productions.

Steiner organized a playwright's guild, staged yearly benefit shows, and at the time of his death was one of the most popular figures in Vienna. With his wife, Rosa (Kollinsky), he had two sons: Franz Steiner, who took over his functions in the theater in 1880 and remained until 1884; and Gábor Steiner, who also became a theater manager and operator of a music hall. Gábor's son was Max Steiner, who worked in London theaters, then in New York, and after 1929 was a Hollywood film composer.

== Some notable premieres during Steiner's tenure at the Theater an der Wien ==
- 1871 – Johann Strauss, jr., Indigo und die 40 Räuber (Indigo and the Forty Thieves)
- 1871 – Ludwig Anzengruber, Der Meineidbauer (The Perjurer)
- 1872 – Ludwig Anzengruber, Die Kreuzelschreiber (The Cross-writer)
- 1874 – Johann Strauss, jr., Die Fledermaus (The Bat)
- 1874 – Ludwig Anzengruber, Der G’wissenswurm (Bad Conscience)
- 1875 – Johann Strauss, jr., Cagliostro in Wien (Cagliostro in Vienna)
- 1876 – Carl Zeller, Joconde
- 1877 – Richard Genée, Nanon
- 1878 – Carl Millöcker, Das verwunschene Schloss (The Enchanted Castle)
- 1879 – Carl Millöcker, Gräfin Dubarry (Countess Dubarry)
- 1879 – Jacques Offenbach, Madame Favart
