= Albin Swoboda Jr. =

German opera singer

Albin Swoboda Jr. (19 March 1883 – 5 January 1970) was a German operatic bass-baritone. Born in Dresden, he was the son of tenor and actor Albin Swoboda Sr. and soprano Friederike Fischer; both of whom were luminaries of the "Golden Age" of Viennese operetta. His grandfather, Joseph Wilhelm Swoboda, also had an important career as a tenor and opera director in Vienna. In 1910 he became romantically involved with opera singer Anna Sutter. Sutter had broken off a relationship with conductor Aloys Obrist around the same time, and Obrist became highly distraught by the situation. On 29 June 1910, Obrist broke into Sutter's apartment, murdered her, and committed suicide in the presence of Swoboda who was unable to stop him.

Swoboda's more-than-40-year-long career was largely based with the Staatsoper Stuttgart where he created roles in several world premieres, including parts in Richard Strauss's Ariadne auf Naxos (1912, Harlequin), Walter Braunfels' Ulenspiegel (1913), Max von Schillings' Mona Lisa (1915, Masolini Pedruzzi), Siegfried Wagner's An allem ist Hütchen schuld! (1917, Teufel), Ture Rangström's Die Kronbraut (1919), Paul Hindemith's Das Nusch-Nuschi (1921, Mung Tha Bya), Egon Wellesz's Scherz, List und Rache (1928), Nico Dostal's Monika (1937), Dostal's Die ungarische Hochzeit (1939, Josef Kismarty), and Franz Grothe's Die Nacht mit Casanova (1942). In 1919 he portrayed the role of Don Diego in the world premiere of Othmar Schoeck's Don Ranudo de Colibrados at the Zurich Opera House. He died in Stuttgart at the age of 86.
