= Indigo und die vierzig Räuber =

1871 operetta composed by Johann Strauss II

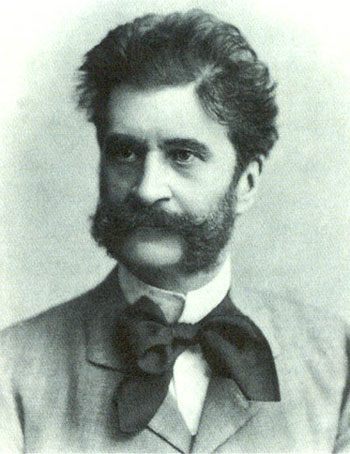
Johann Strauss II

Indigo und die vierzig Räuber (Indigo and the Forty Thieves) is an operetta composed by Johann Strauss II to a German libretto by Maximilian Steiner based on the tale "Ali Baba and the Forty Thieves" from The Book of One Thousand and One Nights.

== Performance history ==
It was first staged on 10 February 1871 at the Theater an der Wien in Vienna, Austria. It was initially granted a warm reception by Vienna's theatre-going public, but the press was more divided in opinion. Typical published reactions were: "It consists of dance music on which Strauss has overlaid text and characters ... A man of Strauss' reputation should never have allowed his name to be associated with such a venture ... It is an interesting production and is a foretaste of great things to come."

The work was successfully restaged in Paris in 1875 under the title Queen Indigo. Then, rechristened A Night on the Bosphorus, it was presented in London in 1876.

Finally, after Strauss' death, the operetta was entirely reworked in 1906 by Max Steiner and staged in Vienna under yet another title, The Thousand and One Nights, which is also the title of one of Strauss' waltzes ("Tausend und eine Nacht", op. 346) of which the melodies were drawn from the stage work.

Max Schönherr later reworked some of the music from this work into a concert piece, and this version has been recorded.

A new recording will be released on Naxos records in 2026 from the original manuscript score (world premiere). The recording took place in Bulgaria Hall on the last week of September 2025 with the Sofia Philharmonic Orchestra and National Choir, conducted by Dario Salvi and with the patronage of the Johann Strauss Society of Great Britain. The cast includes: Imola Mate (Fantasca), Andrea Chudak (Toffana), Alexander Voigt (Ali Baba), Laurence Kaladijan (Romadur), Theo Rüster (Indigo) and Timo Rößner (Janio)

== Roles ==
Role	Voice type	Premiere Cast, 10 February 1871 (Conductor: Johann Strauss II)
Janio	tenor	Albin Swoboda Sr.
Indigo	tenor	Carl Matthias Rott
Ali Baba	tenor	Jani Szika
Romadour	baritone	Carl Adolf Friese
Fantasca	soprano	Marie Geistinger
Piastrella	soprano	Franziska Mellin
Empress	soprano	
