= Albin Swoboda Sr. =

Austrian opera singer (1836–1901)

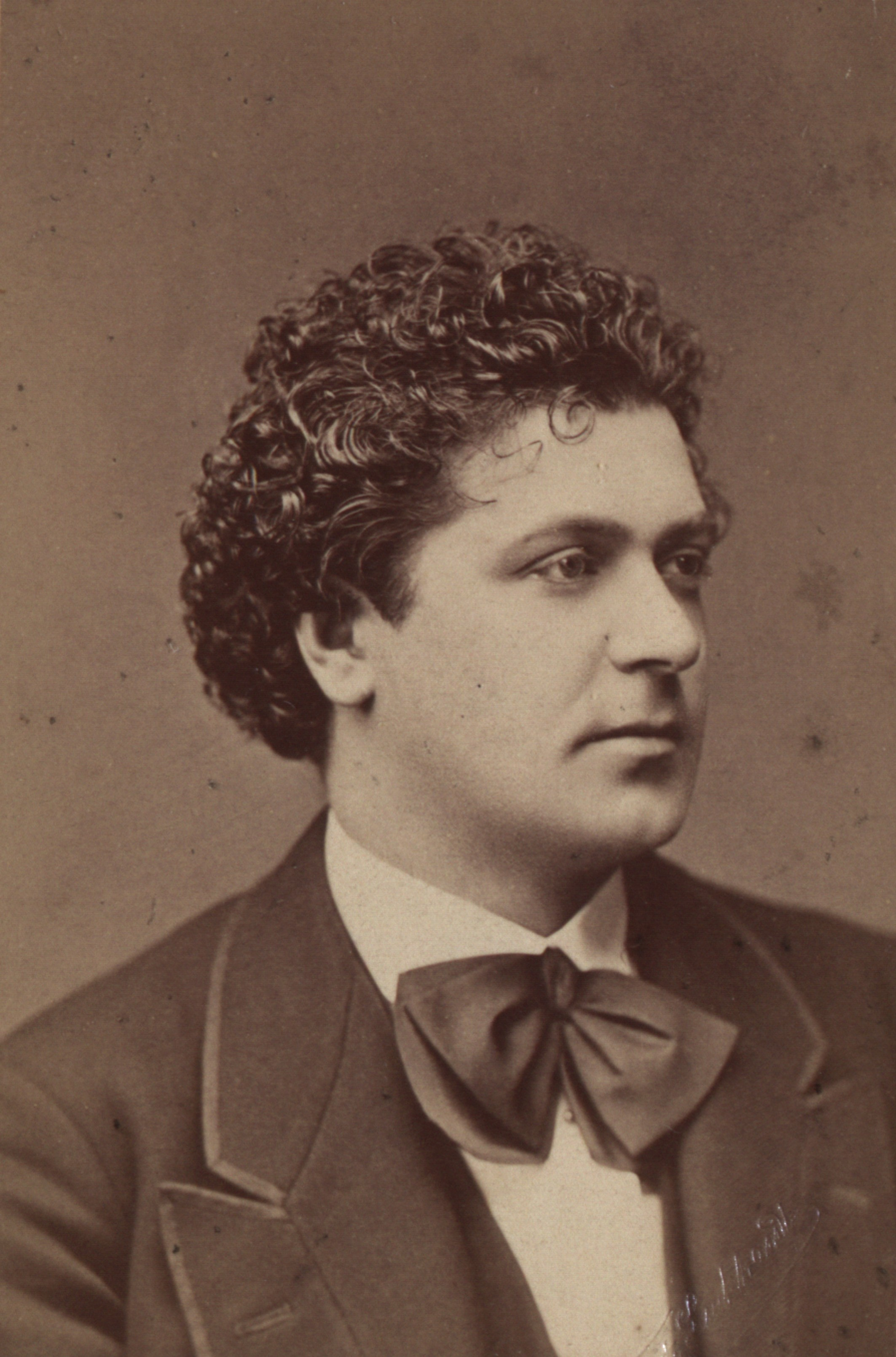
- Photograph of Swoboda by Fritz Luckhardt, c. 1870
- Born: Albin August Heinrich Emil Swoboda; November 13, 1836; Neustrelitz, Grand Duchy of Mecklenburg-Strelitz, German Confederation
- Died: August 5, 1901 (aged 64); Oberlößnitz, Radebeul, Kingdom of Saxony, German Empire
- Children: 2, including Albin Swoboda Jr.
- Parents: Joseph Wilhelm Swoboda; Angelika Peréchon-Swoboda

Albin August Heinrich Emil Swoboda (13 November 1836 – 5 August 1901) was an Austrian operatic tenor, actor, and opera director of German birth. One of the most famous opera singers of the "Golden Age" of Viennese operetta, he was a leading tenor and dramatic stage actor at the Theater an der Wien from 1859–1878. He notably appeared in the world premieres of operettas by composers Jacques Offenbach, Johann Strauss II, and Franz von Suppé. He also appeared in musical comedies and plays in Vienna, and appeared in stage productions of all kinds as a guest artist in theatres in Germany, Hungary, Poland, and Russia. His son Albin Swoboda Jr. also had a successful career as an opera singer. In 1955 a street in the Hietzing district of Vienna was named after him.

== Early life ==
Born in Neustrelitz, Swoboda was the son of tenor and opera director Joseph Wilhelm Swoboda and dramatic soprano Angelika Peréchon-Swoboda. His brother Karl Swoboda was also an opera singer. During his early years, he moved often with his parents, living in Leipzig (1837–1838), Halle, Saxony-Anhalt (1838–1839), and Düsseldorf (1840–1841). In 1841, both of his parents were engaged at the opera house in Frankfurt am Main, and the family lived there for the next seven years. His mother died in 1846 at the age of 30. In 1848, his father was offered a position at the Carltheater in Vienna, and the family accordingly moved to that city. In 1849, his father joined the Vienna Hofoper, where he worked as a leading comprimario tenor for the next 16 years and then served as the theatre's director from 1865–1875.

== Career ==
Swoboda began his career in 1852 as a member of the opera chorus at the Theater in der Josefstadt in Vienna, a decision which his father initially opposed. He left there a few years later to join the opera house in Kraków where he sang his first leading roles and appeared in plays. Engagements in operas and plays soon followed in Linz, Bad Ischl, and Salzburg. In 1857 he returned to Vienna when Johann Nestroy hired him as a leading tenor at the Carltheater where he appeared mostly in musical comedies and farces.

In 1859 Swoboda left the Carltheater to become a leading tenor and dramatic actor at the Theater an der Wien. He remained committed to that theatre for the next 14 years, and afterwards appeared as a guest artist. He drew acclaim in the operetta repertoire, and notably sang in numerous world premieres at that house; including Karl in Suppé's Das Pensionat (1860), Janio in Strauss's Indigo und die vierzig Räuber, Lambrequin in Offenbach's Der schwarze Korsar (1872), Arthur Bryk in Strauss's Der Karneval in Rom (1873), and Helmut Forst in Strauss's Blindekuh (1878). Other roles in his repertoire included Pâris in La belle Hélène, Piquillo in La Périchole, and the title role in Orpheus in the Underworld. As a dramatic actor he appeared to critical success in the world premieres of several plays by Ludwig Anzengruber among other stage parts.

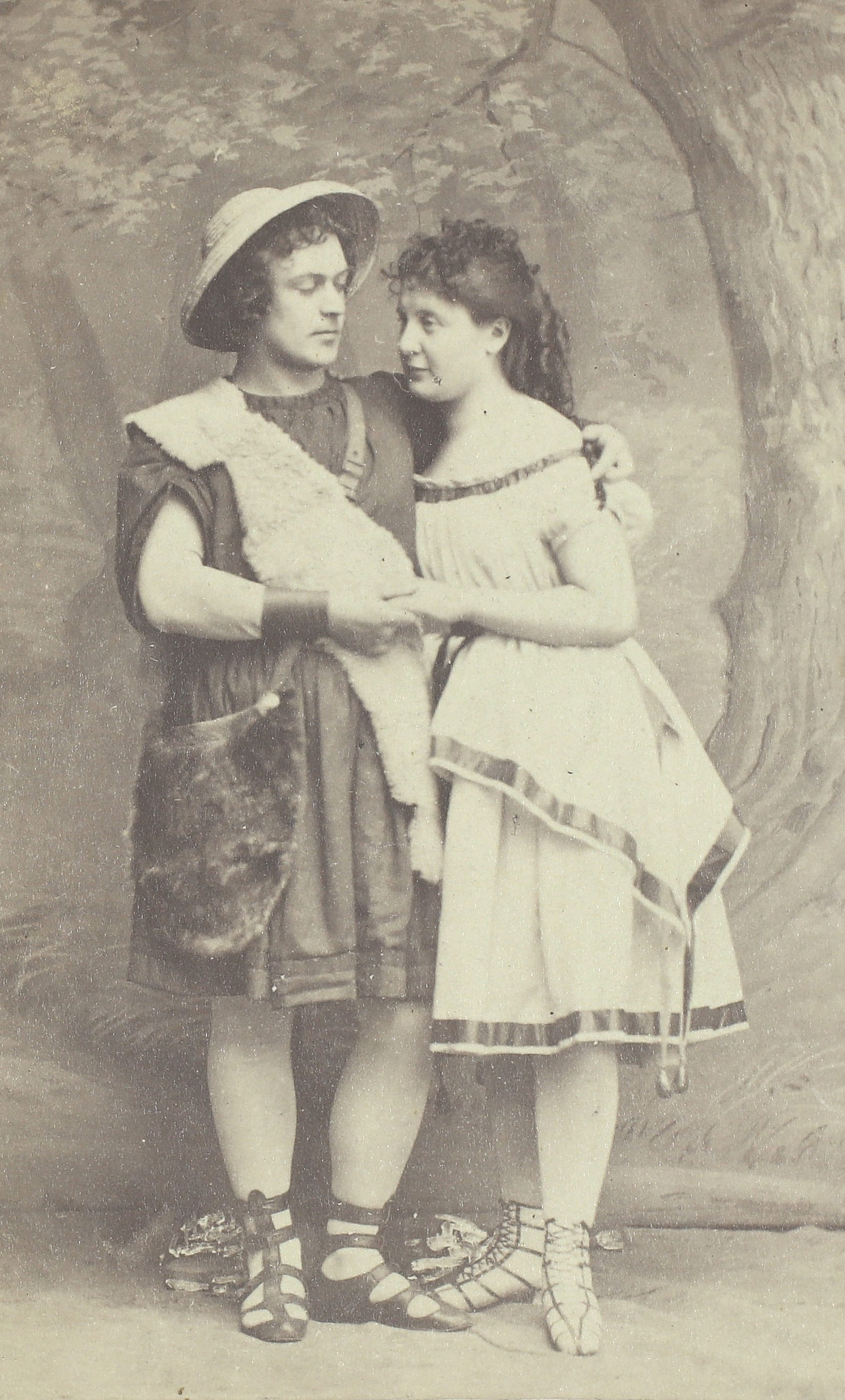
Swoboda and Fischer as Pyramus and Thisbe in Jacques Offenbach's operetta Les bergers, photograph by Alois Beer, 1866

In 1873 Swoboda was appointed the first artistic director at the newly built Ringtheater which presented its first performance in January 1874. He left there in 1875 to work in the same capacity at the new Deutsches Theater Budapest under his father who was general director. He notably sang the role of Eisenstein in Die Fledermaus for the theatre's inaugural performance. In January 1878 he succeeded his father as general director of theatre, but left that position the following year due to financial reasons. In 1880 he performed in operettas and musical comedies in Russia and Poland, including performances in St. Petersburg, Moscow, Riga, and Lodz among others. In 1881 he was committed to the Semperoper, after which he abandoned his singing career and performed only as a dramatic actor. Other than appearances in popular plays in Vienna in 1883 and 1898, his latter career never matched the success he enjoyed earlier.

Swoboda died in 1901 at the age of 64. He was married twice during his life. His first marriage to soprano Friederike Fischer-Swoboda (1844–1898), whom he starred opposite on several occasions at the Theater an der Wien, ended in divorce. Their son Albin Swoboda Jr. had a successful career as an operatic bass-baritone. His second marriage was to the dramatic actress Gretchen Swoboda (1872–1921).
