= Zar und Zimmermann =

Opera from Albert Lortzing

- Opera by Albert Lortzing
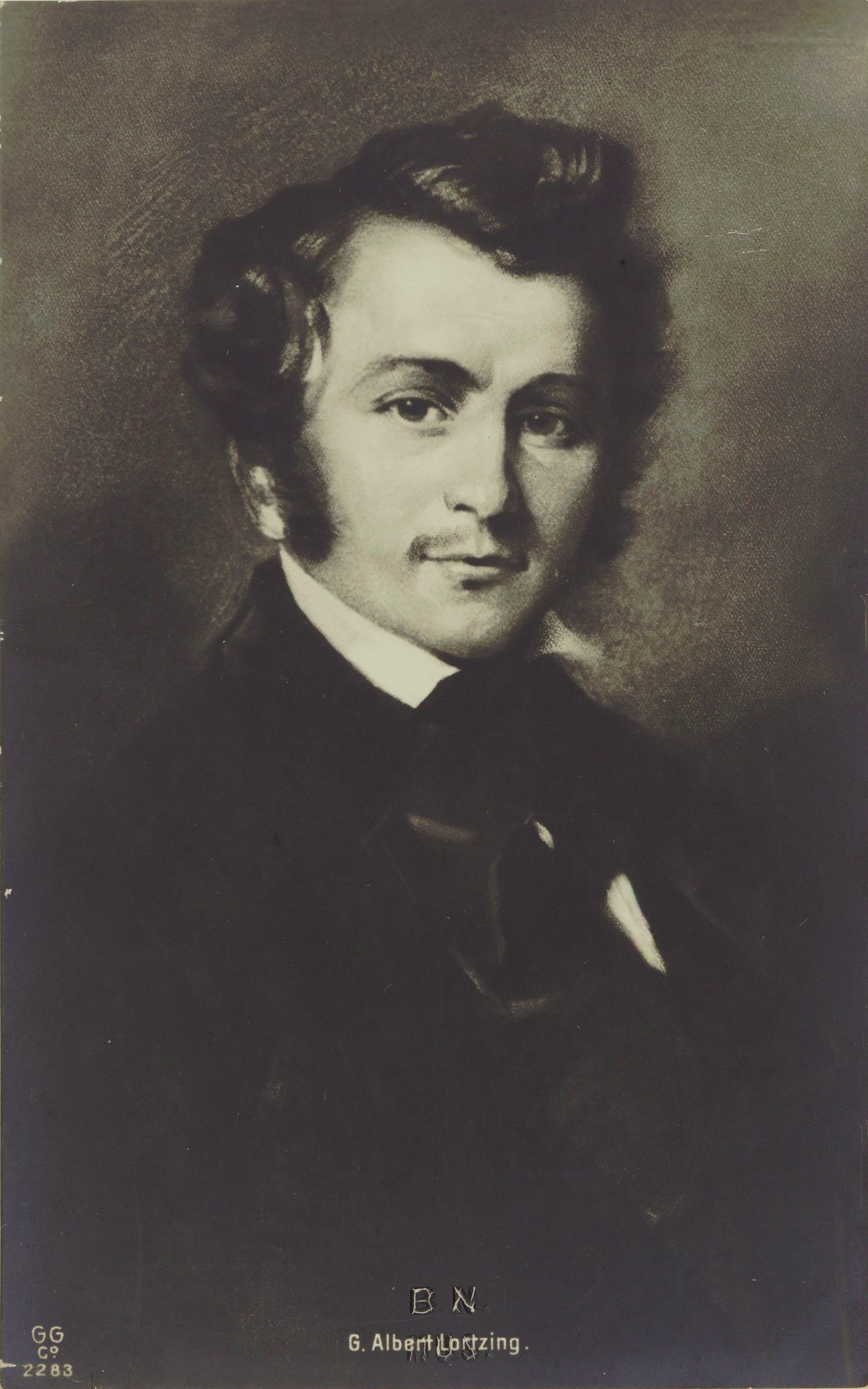
- The composer
- Translation: Tsar and Carpenter
- Librettist: Lortzing
- Language: German
- Based on: Der Bürgermeister von Saardam by Georg Christian Römer
- Premiere: 22 December 1837; Stadttheater, Leipzig

Zar und Zimmermann (Tsar and Carpenter) is a comic opera in three acts, music by Albert Lortzing, libretto by the composer after Georg Christian Römer's Der Bürgermeister von Saardam, oder Die zwei Peter, itself based on the French play Le Bourgmestre de Saardam, ou Les deux Pierre by Mélésville, Jean-Toussaint Merle, and Eugène Centiran de Boirie. Ultimately, it goes back to the historical Grand Embassy of Peter the Great. Gaetano Donizetti had set the same story in his 1827 opera Il borgomastro di Saardam.

== Performance history ==
The opera was first performed at the Stadttheater in Leipzig, on 22 December 1837. Lortzing's most successful and enduring work, it is still regularly performed in German-speaking countries.

== Roles ==
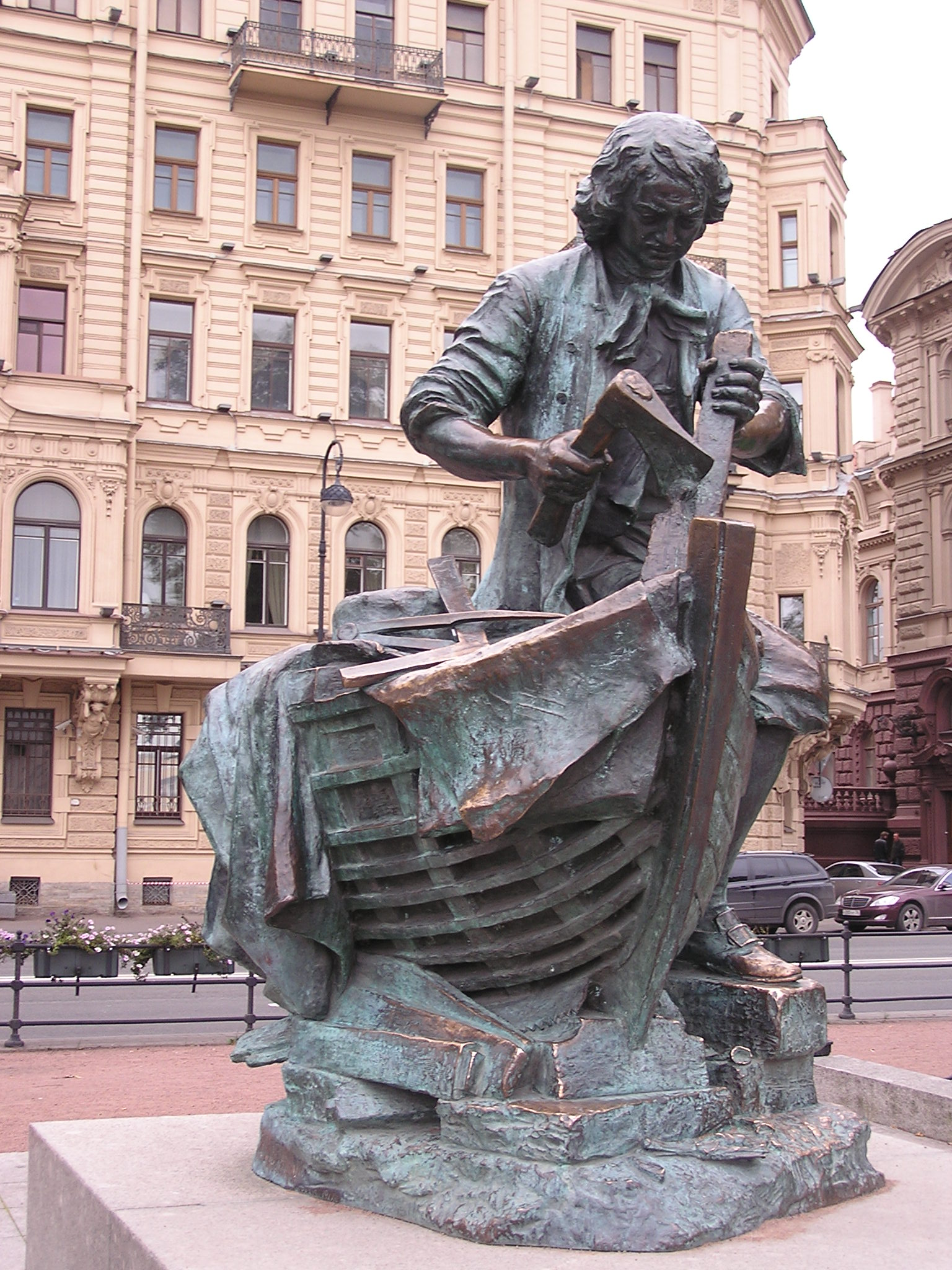
Peter the Great as carpenter, Saint Petersburg

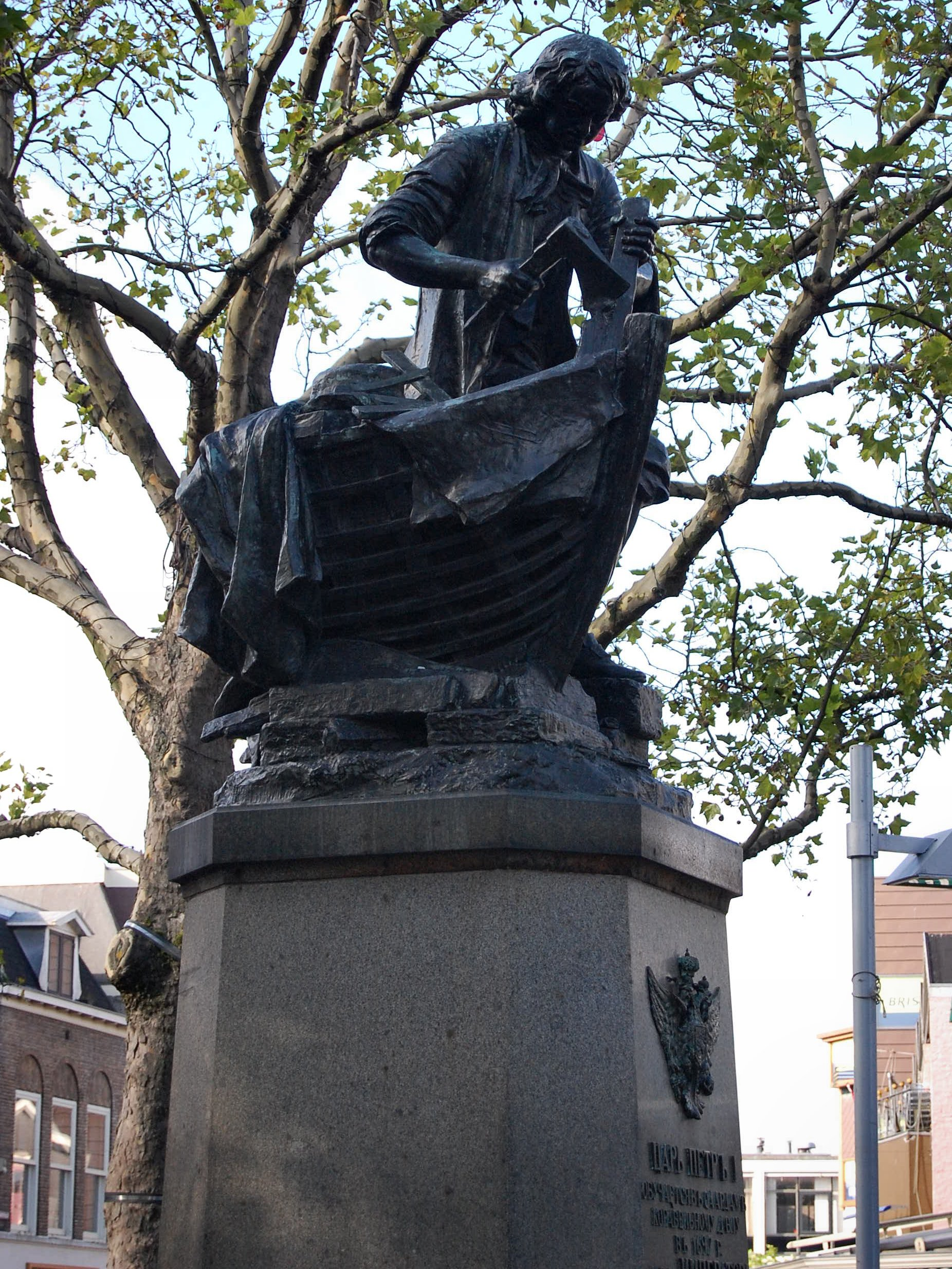
Peter the Great as carpenter, Zaandam

Roles, voice types, premiere cast
| Role | Voice type | Premiere cast, 22 December 1837 |
|---|---|---|
| Peter the Great, Tsar of Russia | baritone | Karl Becker |
| Peter Ivanov, young Russian carpenter | tenor | Albert Lortzing |
| Van Bett, burgomaster of Saardam | bass | Gotthelf Leberecht Berthold |
| Marie, niece of van Bett | soprano | Caroline Günther-Bachmann |
| Marquis de Chateauneuf, French ambassador | tenor | Joseph Wilhelm Swoboda |
| Widow Browe, master carpenter | mezzo-soprano | Caroline Günther-Bachmann |
| General Lefort, Russian ambassador | bass | Pogner |
| Lord Syndham, English ambassador | bass | Heinrich Richter |

== Synopsis ==
The action takes place in Saardam, Holland, in 1698.

Peter the Great of Russia, disguised as Peter Michaelov, a common laborer, is working in a shipyard in the Dutch town of Saardam, to learn shipbuilding techniques for his navy. He befriends a fellow Russian also working in the yard, Peter Ivanov, a deserter from the Russian army. Peter Ivanov is in love with Marie, the niece of Van Bett, the Burgomaster of Saardam. Tsar Peter is told of trouble in Russia, and decides to return home.

Van Bett has been told to find a foreigner named Peter in the shipyard. The English ambassador, Syndham, and the French ambassador, Chateauneuf, have both heard the rumor of Tsar Peter's disguised presence and are looking for him, which convinces Van Bett that "Peter" is an important man. But in confusion, he identifies the wrong Peter. Chateauneuf recognises the real Tsar, and concludes an alliance with him. Syndham is fooled and presents Peter Ivanov with a passport.

Van Bett, very confused, salutes Peter Ivanov with an elaborate ceremony. Peter Ivanov gives the passport to Tsar Peter, who uses it to leave quietly, having first blessed Peter Ivanov's marriage to Marie, and appointed him to a high office in Russia.

== Recordings and adaptations ==
- Georg Hann, Hubert Buchta, Wilhelm Strienz, Margot Gripekoven, Bruno Muller, Heinrich Holzlin, Emma Mayer, Hermann Schmid-Berikoven. Chor und Orchester des Reichssenders Stuttgart / Bernhard Zimmerman. 28 May 1936.(The Radio Years) (details from the recording)
- Hermann Prey, Peter Schreier, Gottlob Frick, Erika Köth; Chor des Leipziger Rundfunks, Staatskapelle Dresden, conductor Robert Heger. 1966 EMI.
- Raymond Wolansky, Peter Haage, Hans Sotin, Lucia Popp, Herbert Fliether, Noël Mangin, Horst Wilhelm, Ursula Boese, Franz Grundheber; Ballet and Chorus of the Hamburg State Opera, Philharmonisches Staatsorchester Hamburg, conductor Sir Charles Mackerras. 1969 Arthaus Musik.
- In 1956 it was adapted into a film in East Germany, The Czar and the Carpenter.
