= Joseph Wilhelm Swoboda =

Austrian opera singer (1806–1882)

Joseph Wilhelm Swoboda (1806–1882) was an operatic tenor, actor, and opera director from the Austrian Empire. He started his career as a stage actor in his native country during the 1820s. He began his opera career in 1836 in Neustrelitz, and after appearing at several German opera houses, became a leading and comprimario tenor at the Vienna Hofoper from 1849–1865. He then served as the director of that theatre from 1865–1875; after which he worked in the same capacity at the Deutsches Theater Budapest from 1875–1878.

== Early life and career ==
Born in Prague, Swoboda studied philosophy in his native city and spent his early career there as a stage actor during the 1820s and 1830s. In 1836–1837 he started singing in operas at the court theatre in Neustrelitz; followed by engagements at the Leipzig Opera House (1837–1838) and the Halle Opera House (1838–1839). On 22 December 1837 he created the role of the Marquis de Chateauneuf in Albert Lortzing's Zar und Zimmermann in Leipzig. In the 1840–1841 season in Düsseldorf he appeared opposite his wife, dramatic soprano Angelika Peréchon-Swoboda, under the stage name Joseph Nork. In 1841 both he and his wife were engaged at the opera house in Frankfurt am Main. He continued to perform there through 1848 as Joseph Nork, mostly in buffo and comprimario roles. In 1846 his wife died at the age of 30. Their son, Albin Swoboda, Sr. (1836–1901) would later become one of the most famous opera singers in the "Golden Age" of Viennese operetta, and their other son Karl Swoboda was also an opera singer. Their grandson Albin Swoboda, Jr. was a successful bass-baritone.

== Singing in Vienna ==
In 1848–1849 Swoboda performed at the Carltheater in Vienna, once again using his real name, Joseph Swobada. He then joined the Vienna Hofoper in the autumn of 1849 where he was billed as Wilhelm Swoboda. He became one of the main tenors at that house, singing both leading and supporting roles there up into the mid-1860s. Among the parts he sang in Vienna were Beausoleil in Le panier fleuri, Chapelou in Le postillon de Lonjumeau, Count Almaviva in The Barber of Seville, Count Juliano Le domino noir, Daniel in Zampa, Elvino in La sonnambula, Franz in Faust, Max in Der Freischütz, Peter Ivanov in Zar und Zimmermann, Siméon in Joseph, Tamino in The Magic Flute, Tybalt in I Capuleti e i Montecchi, and the title role in Fra Diavolo. He also appeared as a guest artist during these years in theatres throughout Germany and in Prague, and was frequent performer at the Theater in der Josefstadt in Vienna.

== Opera director ==
In 1865 Swoboda retired from his singing career when he was appointed the director of the Vienna Hofoper. He left that position in 1875 to take over the general management of the Deutsches Theater Budapest with his son Albin serving as artistic director. Financial difficulties plagued the theatre during his time there; eventually causing him to leave in January 1878. His son replaced him as general director. He died four years later in Berlin.
