= Friedrich Strampfer =

German actor and theatre manager (1823–1890)

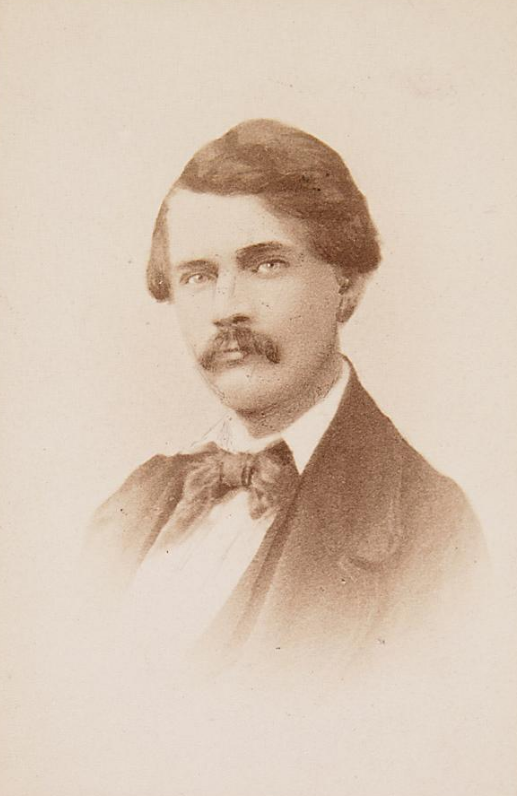
Photograph of Strampfer in the 1850s

Friedrich Strampfer (24 July 1823 – 7 April 1890) was a German actor and theatre manager.

His career of varied fortunes included a successful period in the 1860s running the Theater an der Wien in Vienna; he managed many other theatres for short periods, and lived for several years in North America.

== Life ==
He was born in Grimma in Saxony. His father, Heinrich Strampfer (c.1790–1848), an actor, had appeared in Linz, and in Vienna at the Theater in der Leopoldstadt and the Theater an der Wien.

Friedrich's first engagement was in Linz in 1841, and afterwards appeared in Wiener Neustadt and Olomouc. In 1843, he was engaged at the court theatre in Weimar, being recommended by Carl von La Roche and Ottilie von Goethe.

He married in 1845 Anna von Ottenburg, an actress in the court theatre; she was Roman Catholic and Strampfer was Lutheran, so a priest to officiate was found with difficulty. The marriage was soon after declared null and void by Charles Frederick, Grand Duke of Saxe-Weimar-Eisenach, and Strampfer and Anna were dismissed from the court theatre of Weimar. Anna died in 1858, and he later remarried.

For a few years from 1845, he was in an acting troupe, travelling through Germany and Austria. From 1850 to 1862, he was theatre manager successively in Trieste, Timișoara, where he founded the city's first permanent theatre, and Ljubljana.

=== In Vienna ===
In 1862, Strampfer became manager of the Theater an der Wien; he ran the theatre with great success, with productions particularly of operettas of Jacques Offenbach, and engaging Josefine Gallmeyer and Marie Geistinger. He left the theatre in 1869.

In 1870, he acquired the old building of the Gesellschaft der Musikfreunde in Vienna, and opened it in 1871 as the Strampfer-Theater. It had 600 seats and 28 boxes. In 1873, he also became the manager of the German Theatre, Budapest. The ventures were not successful, and, in financial difficulty, he gave up both theatres in 1874. From 1875 until 1878, he gave acting lessons in Vienna, and during the following few years in Vienna he was manager successively of the Ringtheater, the Vienna Municipal Theatre and the Carltheater.

=== America and later ===
From 1883 to 1888 he lived in Canada and the United States as a farmer, manager of a German-American travelling theatre, newspaper editor and reciter. He returned to Europe and from 1889, together with Anna Mayr-Peyrimsky (1855–1915), a singer and singing teacher, he was director of a theatre school in Graz. He died in Graz in 1890.

== Commentaries ==
His biographer in Biographisches Lexikon des Kaiserthums Oesterreich (1879) wrote that Strampfer "has been praised for being particularly fortunate in discovering talent for the stage." His biographer in Allgemeine Deutsche Biographie (1893) wrote: "Strampfer was by nature an adventurer, full of enterprising spirit and understanding of the stage and the public."
