= Anna Sutter =

Swiss opera singer (1871–1910)

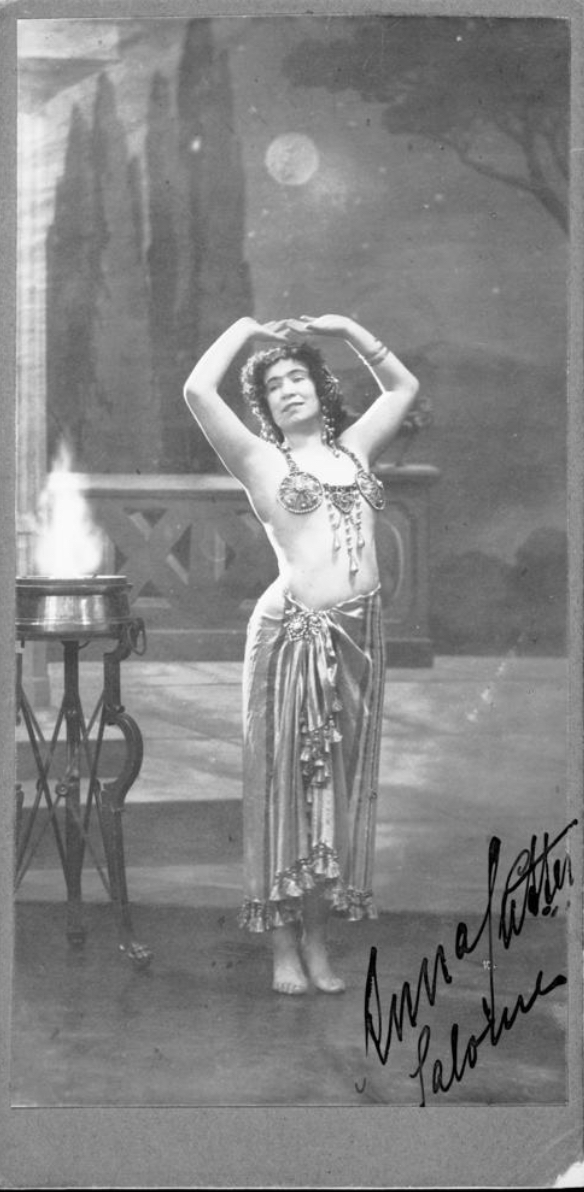
Anna Sutter as Salome

Anna Sutter (26 November 1871 – 29 June 1910) was a Swiss operatic soprano. Born in Wil, she earned a diploma in piano performance from the Bern Conservatory before studying singing in Munich. She made her debut at the Volkstheater in Munich in 1892. From 1892 to 1895, she was committed to the Stadttheater von Augsburg. From 1895 until her death 15 years later she was a member of the Staatsoper Stuttgart. During her career she also performed as a guest artist at the Bavarian State Opera, the Berlin State Opera, and the Frankfurt Opera among others. Her repertoire included Sieglinde in Richard Wagner's The Ring Cycle and the title role in Richard Strauss' Salome.

== Personal life ==
Her career was cut short when she was murdered by conductor Aloys Obrist in her Stuttgart apartment. Sutter's obituary compared her life to that of Salome, claiming “She was a natural, full of unmediated, effervescent temperament; she lived the roles she played.” Prior to her death, she had broken off a romantic relationship with Obrist and become involved with the bass-baritone Albin Swoboda, Jr. who was just 17 years old at the time.

Unusual for an unmarried woman at that time she gave birth to a daughter in 1900 (from Hans Freiherr von Entress-Fürsteneck) and to a son in 1902 (from Hugo Reichenberger).
