= Aloys Obrist =

German musicologist

Aloys Obrist, also Alois Obrist (30 March 1867 – 29 June 1910) was a German musicologist, Kapellmeister and conductor.

== Life ==
Born in Sanremo, Obrist studied music in Weimar and in Berlin where he received his doctorate in musicology in 1892. Afterwards he received a proposition to become Kapellmeister at the Augsburg City Theatre. From September 1895 to 1900 he was Hofkapellmeister at the Staatstheater Stuttgart (Kingdom of Württemberg), where he made great contributions to the modernization of the repertoire of subscription concerts of the Hofkapelle. From 1901 to 1907 he was curator of the Liszt-House Weimar.

He was married to theatre actress Hildegard Jenicke. His brother Hermann Obrist was a famous sculptor.

== Death ==
Obrist's affair with the opera singer Anna Sutter was to prove fatal. After Sutter had ended the relationship in 1909 after two years, Obrist broke into her apartment on 29 June 1910, and - after his love was rejected once again - shot her with two pistol shots, before he took his own life with five shots.

Obrist died in Stuttgart at the age of 43.

== Work ==
- Melchior Franck. Ein Beitrag zur Geschichte der weltlichen Composition in Deutschland in der Zeit vor dem 30jährigen Krieg. Phil. Diss., Berlin 1892, online.
- Was sagt uns das Liszt-Museum? In Der Kunstwart. Munich: Callwey, vol. 19.1906, 21, pp. 480–487.
- Klavierspielapparate und musikalische Seelenwerte. In Der Kunstwart. Munich, Callwey. vol. 19,1 (1905/06), pp. 535–540
- Die historische und künstlerische Bedeutung der Wiederbelebung altertümlicher Musikinstrumente. Vortrag, gehalten auf dem Basler Kongreß der "Internationalen Musikgesellschaft" i. J. 1906. In Zeitschrift für Instrumentenbau. Leipzig, de Wit. Vol. 27 (1907), 23 (11 May), pp. 711–714
- Richard Batka; Aloys Obrist: Klavierspielapparate. Munich: Callwey; Leipzig: Schlüter & Co.: 1914 (4th ed.). (Flugschrift zur Ausdruckskultur, Dürer-Bund; 8)

== Literature ==
- Georg Günther: Carmen – letzter Akt: die Künstlertragödie Sutter – Obrist von 1910 und die Stuttgarter Oper um 1900. Accompanying volume and catalogue to the exhibition of the State Archive Ludwigsburg and the City Archive Stuttgart (2001).
- Musikbibliothek des † Herrn Hofkapellmeisters Hofrat Dr. A. Obrist. Stuttgart: R. Levi, [1911]. (Antiquariats-Katalog Nr. 189 b R. Levi, Stuttgart)
- Melchior Franck, ein Beitrag zur Geschichte der weltlichen Composition in Deutschland in der Zeit vor dem 3ojährigen Krieg], Inaugural-Dissertation von Aloys Obrist
- Neue Musikzeitung, 21st year, 1910, issue 20, p. 418.
- Musikalisches Wochenblatt, 1899, p. 555
