= Josefine Gallmeyer =

Austrian stage actress (1838-1884)

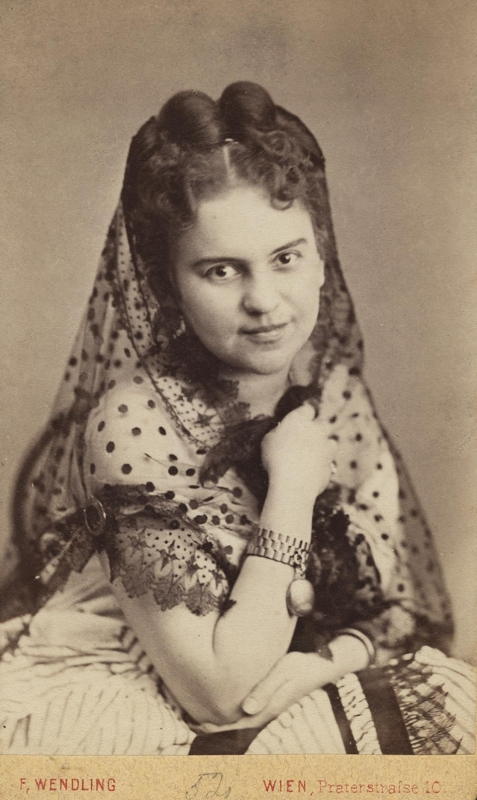
- Portrait by Friedrich Wendling
- Born: 27 February 1838; Leipzig, Kingdom of Saxony
- Died: 3 February 1884 (aged 45); Vienna, Austria-Hungary
- Resting place: Vienna Central Cemetery
- Occupations: Actress; theatre director
- Years active: 1853–1884
- Known for: Leading stage actress of 19th-century Vienna
- Notable work: Aus purem Haß, Sarah und Bernhard

Josefine Gallmeyer (27 February 1838 – 3 February 1884) was an Austrian actress and theatre director of German origin.

== Early life ==
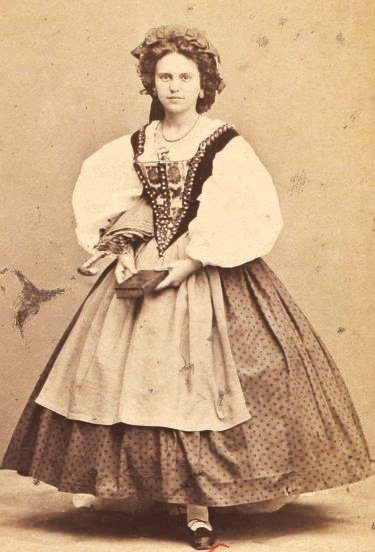
Photo of young Josefine

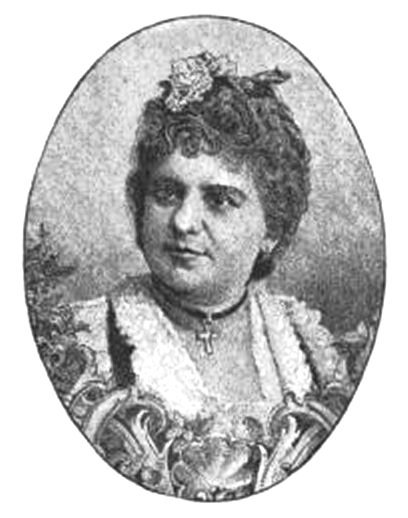
Photo of Josefine

Gallmeyer was born 27 February 1838 in Leipzig.

She was the illegitimate daughter of the actress Katharina Tomaselli, member of the Austrian branch of the Tomaselli family, with opera singer Michael Greiner. In 1842, she took the surname of her stepfather, Christian Gallmeyer.

== Career ==
In 1853, at the age of 15, Gallmeyer made her debut at the Brno City Theatre. Thereafter, she was employed by the United German Theatres theatre company in Budapest. However, her contract was terminated without notice after a short time because of disobedience and insubordination.

Back in Brno, she increasingly appeared as a parodist and was discovered by Johann Nepomuk Nestroy in 1856. After guesting at the Theater in der Josefstadt, Nestroy facilitated Gallmeyer's residency at the Carltheater in Vienna in 1857. This collaboration proved unfruitful and Gallmeyer returned to her work in Brno.

In addition to further performances in Brno, she gave guest performances in Sibiu and Timișoara. Friedrich Strampfer, the director of the German State Theatre Timișoara, engaged her there and further facilitated a tour of Germany. There, she guested at the Victoria-Theater in Berlin and at the Königliches Hoftheater in Dresden. In Dresden, her work was cut short after one performance due to erratic behavior.

In 1862, Gallmeyer joined Strampfer in Vienna as he became director of the Theater an der Wien. There, she achieved her breakthrough with the posse of Ottokar Franz Ebersberg and Karl Costa.

In 1865, she returned to the Carltheater. Jacques Offenbach, from whom she expected a part, refused to write even one line for her. In 1875, she began to direct the Strampfer-Theater with writer Julius Rosen, which closed due to insolvency in 1884.

From 1882 to 1883, she managed to rehabilitate her image with a tour of the United States. In the following years, she performed at the Theater an der Wien, Carltheater, as well as venues in Hamburg, Berlin and Graz.

== Death and legacy ==
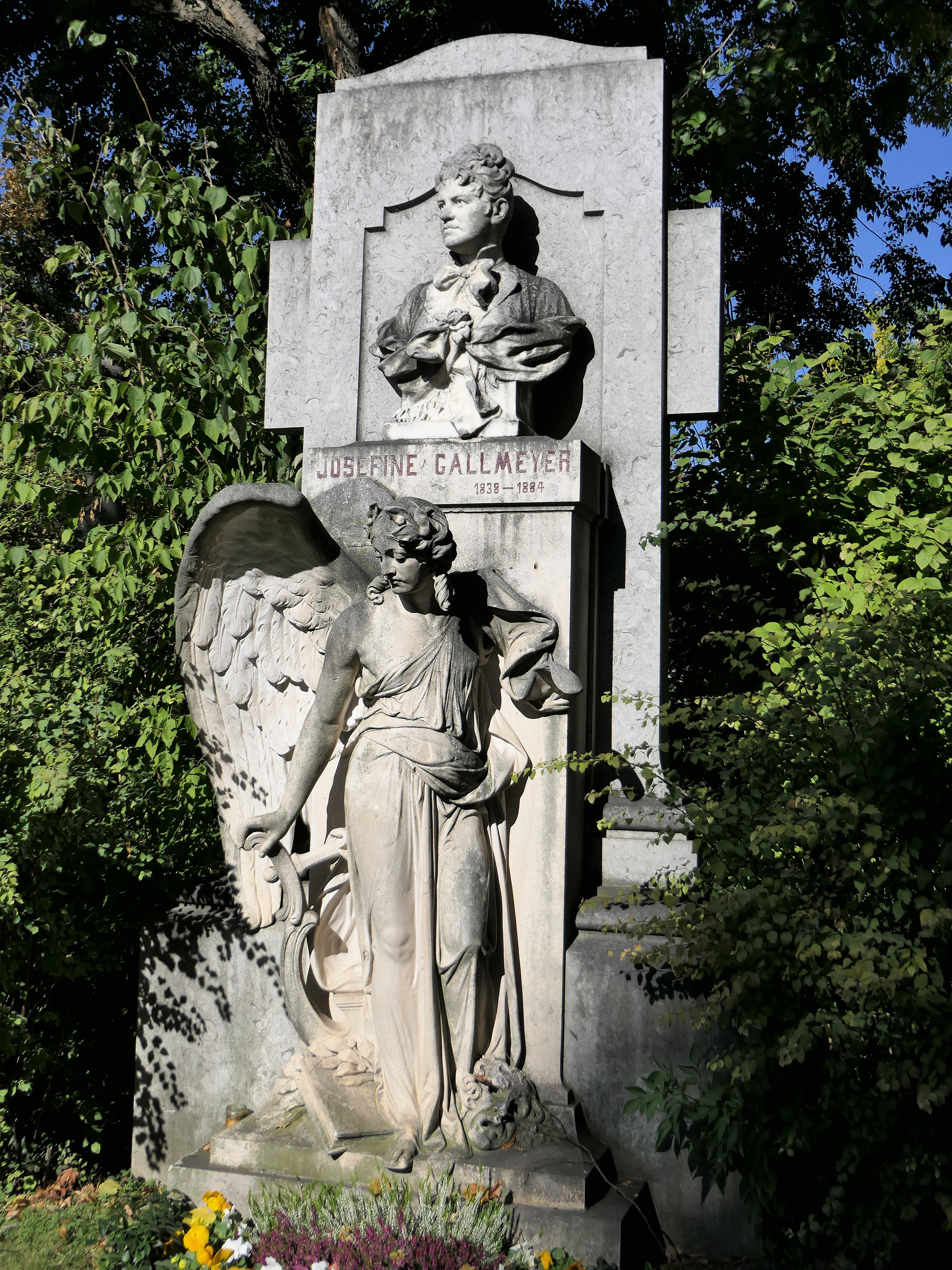
Gallmeyer's grave

Gallmeyer died on 3 February 1884 in Vienna at the age of 45. She was known for her countless affairs and her extravagance. At times, she was considered very wealthy, but due to her immense charity she was impoverished when she died.

Her grave of honor is located in the Vienna Central Cemetery (group 32 A, number 17). In 1928, the Gallmeyergasse in Döbling was named after her.

== Selected roles ==
- Marion – Der preußische Landwehrmann und die französische Bäuerin (Karl Haffner)
- Sternenjungfrau – Die Sternenjungfrau (Karl Haffner).
- Therese – Therese Krones (Karl Haffner)
- Christina – La Vie parisienne (Jacques Offenbach)
- Lilly – Ihre Familie
- Desvarennes – Sergius Panin (Georges Ohnet)
- Rosa – Der Verschwender (Ferdinand Raimund)
- Tini – Die elegante Tini (Camillo Walzel)
- Agnes – Eine leichte Person (August Conradi)

== Works ==
- Aus is' (1882) – novel
- Die Schwestern (1882) – parody
- Aus purem Haß (1883) – drama
- Sarah und Bernhard (1884) – drama
