= Lampertheim =

- Town
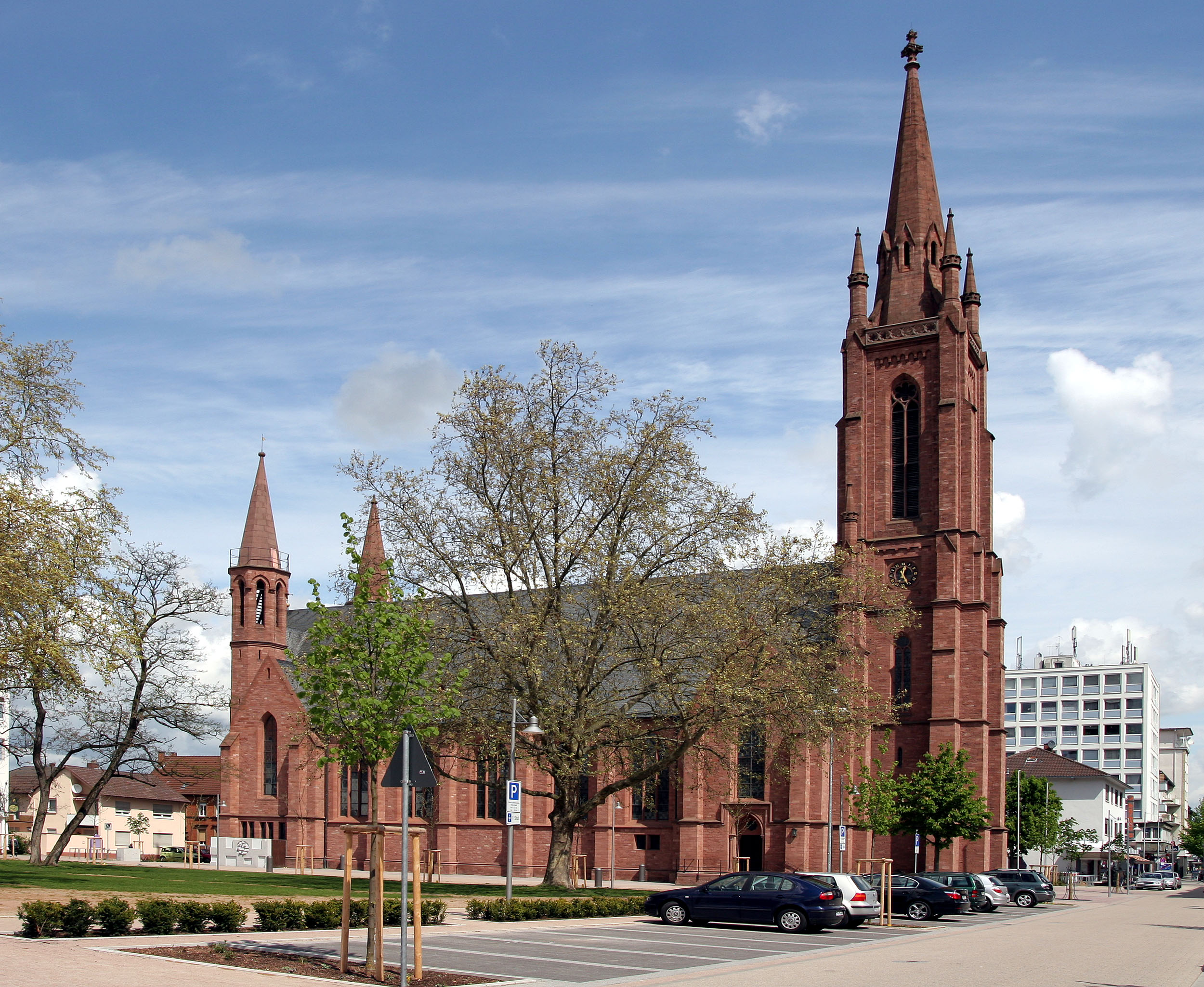
- Domkirche

- Coat of arms

- Location of Lampertheim within Bergstraße district
- Interactive map of Lampertheim
- Location within Germany Location within Hesse
- Coordinates: 49°36′N 8°28′E
- Country: Germany
- State: Hesse
- Admin. region: Darmstadt
- District: Bergstraße

Government
  - Mayor (2019–25): Gottfried Störmer

Area
  - Total: 72.27 km^{2} (27.90 sq mi)
- Elevation: 92 m (302 ft)

Population (2025-12-31)
  - Total: 32,395
  - Density: 448.2/km^{2} (1,161/sq mi)
- Time zone: UTC+01:00 (CET)
  - Summer (DST): UTC+02:00 (CEST)
- Postal codes: 68623
- Dialling codes: 06206, 06256, 06241
- Vehicle registration: HP
- Website: www.lampertheim.de

Lampertheim (German pronunciation: [ˈlampɛʁtˌhaɪm]) is a town in the Bergstraße district in Hesse, Germany. In 1984, the town hosted the 24th Hessentag state festival.

== Geography ==
=== Location ===
Lampertheim lies in the southwest corner of Hesse in the Rhine rift at the Biedensand Conservation Area (an old arm of the Rhine) and borders on Baden-Württemberg and Rhineland-Palatinate. It is on the right bank of the Rhine across from Worms (Rhineland-Palatinate), roughly 15 kilometres (9 miles) north of Mannheim (Baden-Württemberg). The town is broadly, but visibly surrounded by the Odenwald and the Palatinate Forest.

=== Neighbouring communities ===
Lampertheim is one of Hesse’s southernmost towns and borders on Bürstadt, Lorsch, Viernheim and Mannheim (Baden-Württemberg).

=== Constituent communities ===
Lampertheim has the outlying centres of Hofheim, Hüttenfeld, Neuschloß and Rosengarten, which are all Stadtteile. Furthermore, there are residential neighbourhoods named Heide, Oberlach-Rosenau, Am Küblinger Damm, Lache, An der Wormser Straße, In den Böllenruthen, In den Ruthen, Wehrzollhaus, Wildbahn and Seehof.

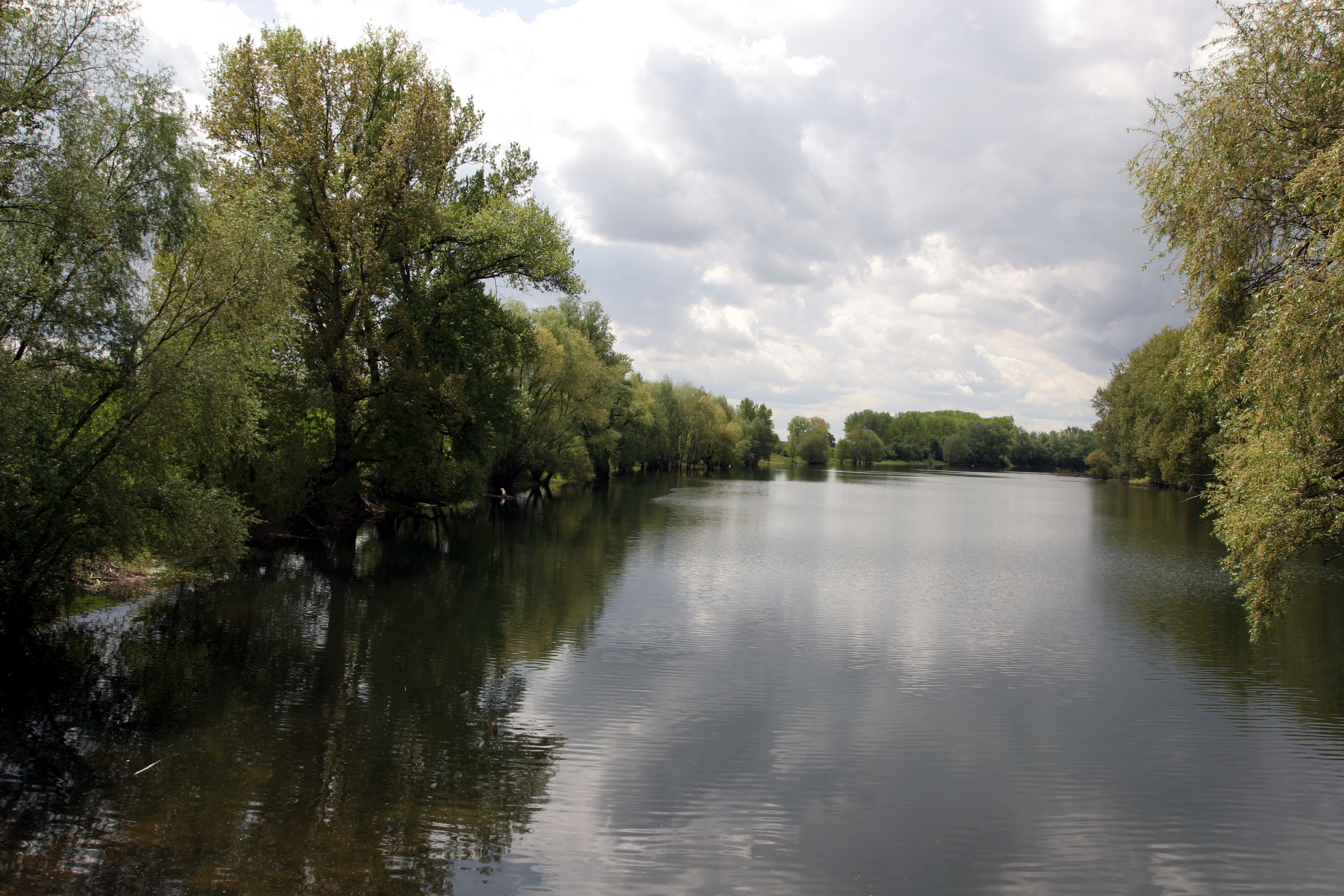
Biedensand Conservation Area

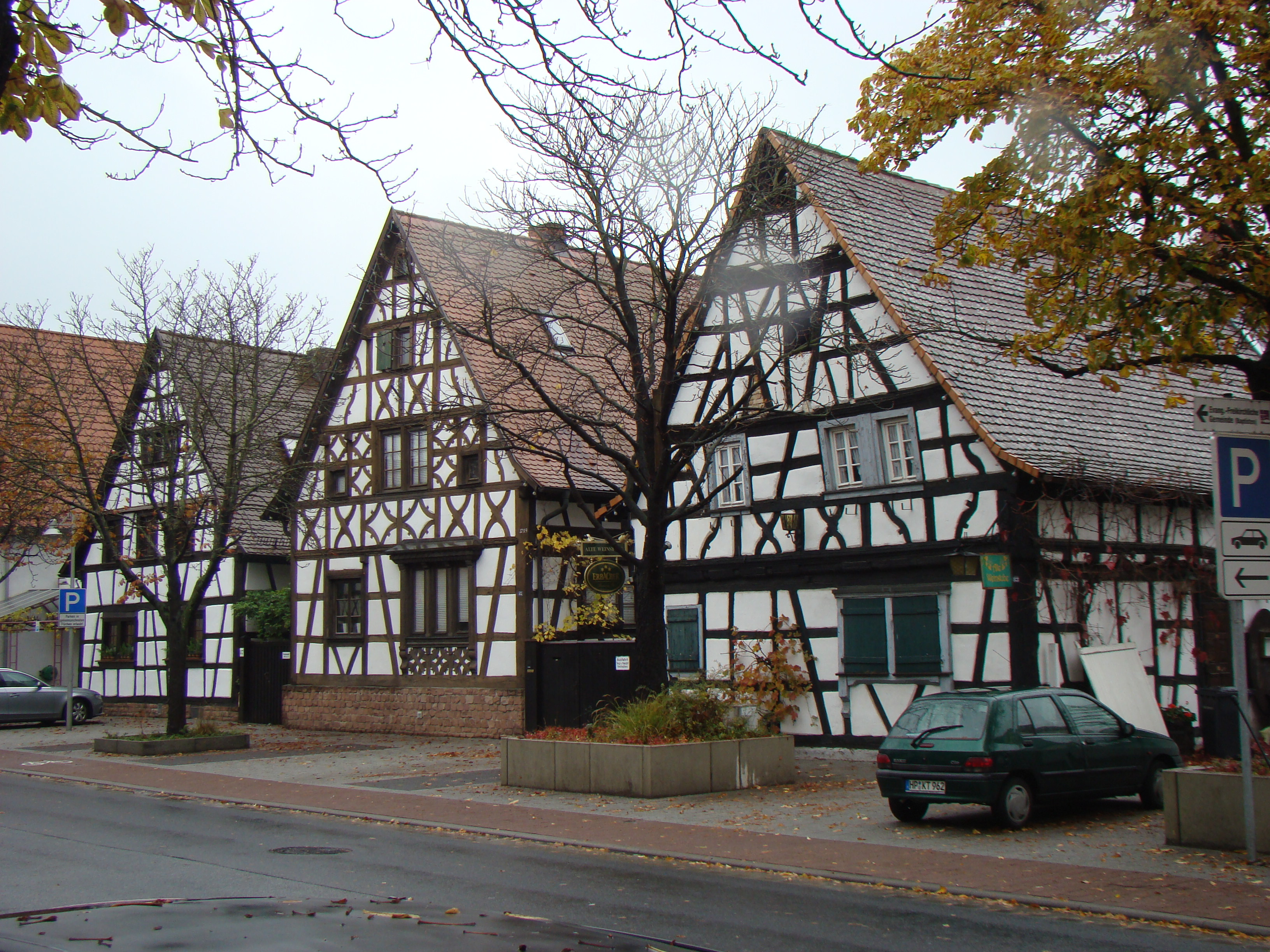
Lampertheim-Half timbered houses

== History ==
The earliest forms of the town’s name handed down from 832 were Langobardonheim or Langbardheim, which led to the conclusion that the town was founded by the Lombards (Langobarden in German). There is however today no further doubt that Lampertheim arose at the time of Frankish settlement and that the name is to be taken as meaning “Lantberths’ Home”, the name “Lantberth” – also “Lampert” or “Lambert” – meaning “Land-brightening ones”. In 1716, the town was granted market rights, and on 4 August 1951 town rights.

The Stadtteil of Rosengarten was originally part of the city of Worms; however, with the post-WWII division of Germany, Worms became part of Rhineland-Palatinate in the French occupation zone, so Rosengarten was incorporated into Hesse in the American occupation zone. In 1971, it became part of Lampertheim.

== Mayors ==
Mayors in Lampertheim since 1960:

Term of office	Mayor
1960–1966	Kurt Zeilfelder
1966–1981	Hans Pfeiffer
1982–1994	Gisbert Dieter
1994–1997	Jürgen Dieter (born 1955)
1997–2013	Erich Maier (born 1947)
since 2013	Gottfried Störmer (born 1959)

== Culture and sightseeing ==
=== Religion ===
Lampertheim has these parishes:

- Catholic parish of Mariä Verkündigung (the Annunciation)
- Evangelical parish of Martin Luther
- Catholic parish of St. Andreas (St. Andrew’s)
- Evangelical Lukasgemeinde (St. Luke’s)
- Evangelical Methodist parish
- Free Evangelical parish
- Evangelical Liebenzeller parish
- Baptist parish, New Apostolic Church

=== Museums ===
Stadtmuseum Lampertheim is the town museum. It is found in an old house and there are guided tours.

=== Music ===
At the Musikschule Lampertheim is a children’s choir led by Sabine Nicolai. One can also learn to play various instruments at the music school, such as violin, piano, flute, trumpet, and others. There is also singing instruction there, either singly or in groups of 3 or 4 pupils.

=== Buildings ===
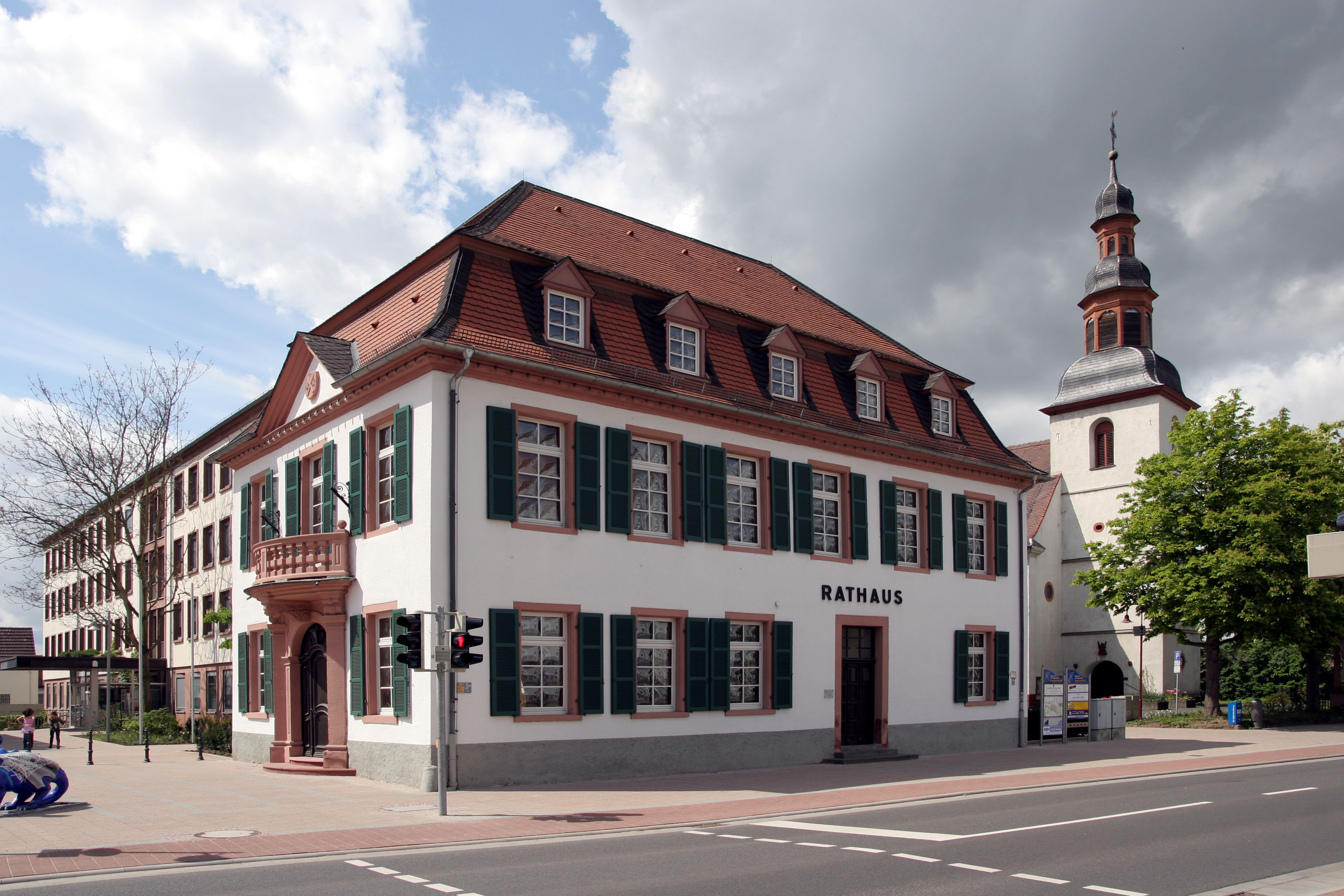
Old Town Hall

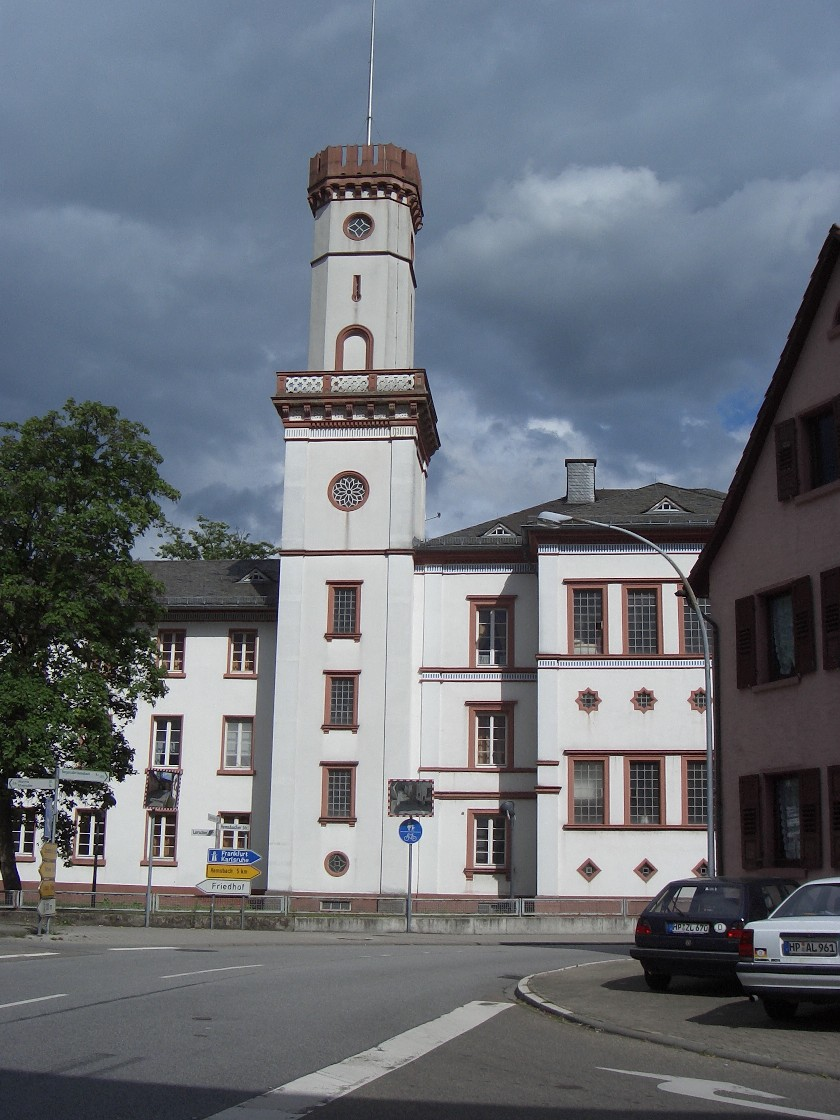
Schloss Rennhof

Worth mentioning is the Schloss Rennhof built by Baron Rothschild in 1853 and the old schoolhouse built in 1906 and 1907, both in Hüttenfeld. In the Schloss Rennhof is found the Litauisches Gymnasium Hüttenfeld (“Lithuanian Gymnasium”), originally established as a school for Lithuanian émigrés’ children after their homeland was overrun by the Soviet Union in the Second World War. It is the only recognized Lithuanian school in Western Europe.

The many transmission masts of the shortwave broadcaster Radio Free Europe Lampertheim, one of the biggest shortwave transmission facilities in Germany, are up to 125 m tall. They are guyed steel-lattice masts, set in pairs in a row, bearing dipole antennae. Some of these transmission masts are linked to each other by crossbeams furnished with catwalks.

=== Sport ===
- DLRG
- TV Lampertheim (gymnastics, football etc.)
- Wassersportverein Lampertheim 1929 e.V. (watersports, among others canoeing)
- Kanu-Club Lampertheim 1952 e.V.
- Olympia Lampertheim (football)

=== Regular events ===
The Lampertheimer Spargellauf ("Asparagus Walk") is a public walking event that is traditionally held a week before the Lampertheim Asparagus Festival (Lampertheimer Spargelfest). It is staged by the Lampertheim Gymnastic Club. Every finisher gets a Spargellauf T-shirt, which comes in a different colour every year.

== Economy and infrastructure ==
=== Transport ===
Lampertheim is on Bundesstraße 47, the Nibelungenstraße, which leads from Worms to Michelstadt in the Odenwald.

Lampterheim is also on Bundesstraße 44, which runs from Mannheim towards Biblis and further.

=== US activities ===
Near Lampertheim, the American foreign broadcasting service Radio Free Europe runs a shortwave transmission facility, and US troops run a United States Army and USAF base, Coleman Barracks, in neighbouring Mannheim-Sandhofen. Furthermore, American soldiers also train at a shooting range in the Lampertheim woods.

=== Education ===
In Lampertheim itself are four secondary schools, the Lessing Gymnasium Lampertheim, a Gymnasium that also received a certificate for “Promotion of the Gifted”. There are also the Alfred-Delp-Schule, a joint Hauptschule-Realschule, and the Biedensandschule, a special school for special-needs pupils. There is also the district vocational school.

== Twin towns – sister cities ==
Lampertheim is twinned with:

- Ermont, France (1966)
- Maldegem, Belgium (1967)
- Adria, Italy (1979)
- Dieulouard, France (1993)
- Świdnica (rural gmina), Poland (2006)

== Notable people ==
- Wilhelm Herz (1912–1998), motorcycle racing driver and world record holder
- Klaus Schlappner (born 1940), football coach
- Manfred Herweh (born 1954), motorcycle racing driver
- Elke Voelker (born 1968), organist, musicologist
- Alexander Bauer (born 1972), politician
- Denis Gremelmayr (born 1981), tennis player
- Carolin Leonhardt (born 1984), sprint canoer
- Nicole Reinhardt (born 1986), canoeist, Olympic champion
- Constantin Braun (born 1988), ice hockey player
- Laurin Braun (born 1991), ice hockey player
