= Das Marienleben =

Song cycle by Paul Hindemith

- Song cycle by Paul Hindemith
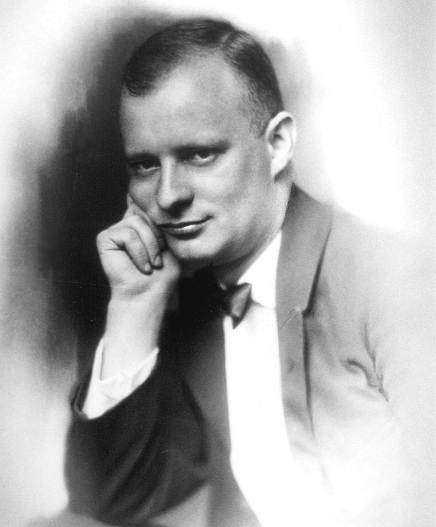
- The composer in 1923
- English: The Life of Mary
- Text: 15 poems by Rainer Maria Rilke
- Language: German
- Based on: Life of Mary
- Composed: 1923, revised 1948
- Movements: 15
- Scoring: Soprano and piano (some also with orchestra)

Das Marienleben
the opening of the song cycle

Das Marienleben (The Life of Mary) is a song cycle by German composer Paul Hindemith. The cycle, written for piano and soprano, sets to music a collection of 15 poems by Rainer Maria Rilke that tells the story of the life of Mary. The cycle was featured in the 1923 Bauhaus exhibition in Weimar. Thirteen years after its 1923 premiere in Frankfurt, Hindemith began extensively revising and reworking the piece, eventually producing a second version which premiered in Hanover in 1948.

Hindemith also orchestrated six of the songs: four in 1938 and two more in 1948.

== Structure ==
The work consists of fifteen movements:

1. Geburt Mariä (Birth of Mary)
2. Die Darstellung (The Presentation)
3. Mariä Verkündigung (Annunciation to Mary)
4. Mariä Heimsuchung (Visitation of Mary)
5. Argwohn Josephs (Joseph's Suspicion)
6. Verkündigung über den Hirten (Annunciation to the shepherds)
7. Geburt Christi (Birth of Christ)
8. Rast auf der Flucht in Ägypten (Rest on the Flight into Egypt)
9. Von der Hochzeit (Of the wedding)
10. Vor der Passion (Before the Passion)
11. Pietà (Pieta)
12. Stillung Mariä mit dem Auferstandenen (Consolation of Mary with the resurrected)
13. Vom Tode Mariä I (Of the Death of Mary I)
14. Vom Tode Mariä II (Of the Death of Mary II)
15. Vom Tode Mariä III (Of the Death of Mary III)

A typical performance lasts around an hour and a half.

== Literature ==
- Wilhelm Sinkovicz: Paul Hindemiths Liederzyklus "Marienleben" und seine beiden Fassungen als Beispiel für den Stilwandel der Musik in der ersten Hälfte des 20. Jahrhunderts. Thesis. Vienna 1993.
