= Alexander Bauer =

German politician (born 1972)

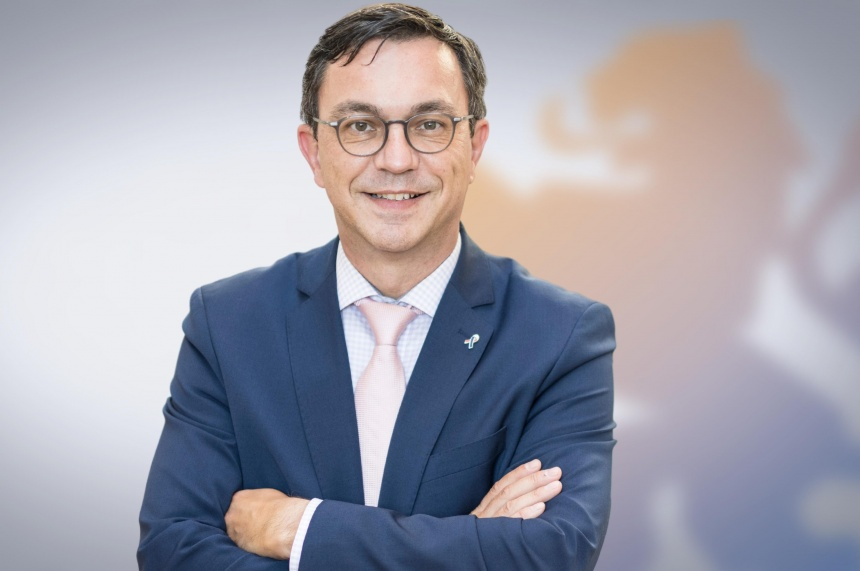
- Bauer in 2022

Member of the Landtag of Hesse
- Incumbent
- Assumed office 5 April 2008
- Preceded by: Peter Lennert
- Constituency: Bergstraße I

Personal details
- Born: 9 June 1972 (age 53) Lampertheim
- Party: Christian Democratic Union (since 1993)

Alexander Bauer (born 9 June 1972 in Lampertheim) is a German politician serving as a member of the Landtag of Hesse since 2008. He has served as deputy group leader of the Christian Democratic Union since 2019.
