= Mariä Verkündigung =

Former monastery church in Mindelheim, Bavaria, Germany

Coordinates: 52°24′23″N 9°42′44″E

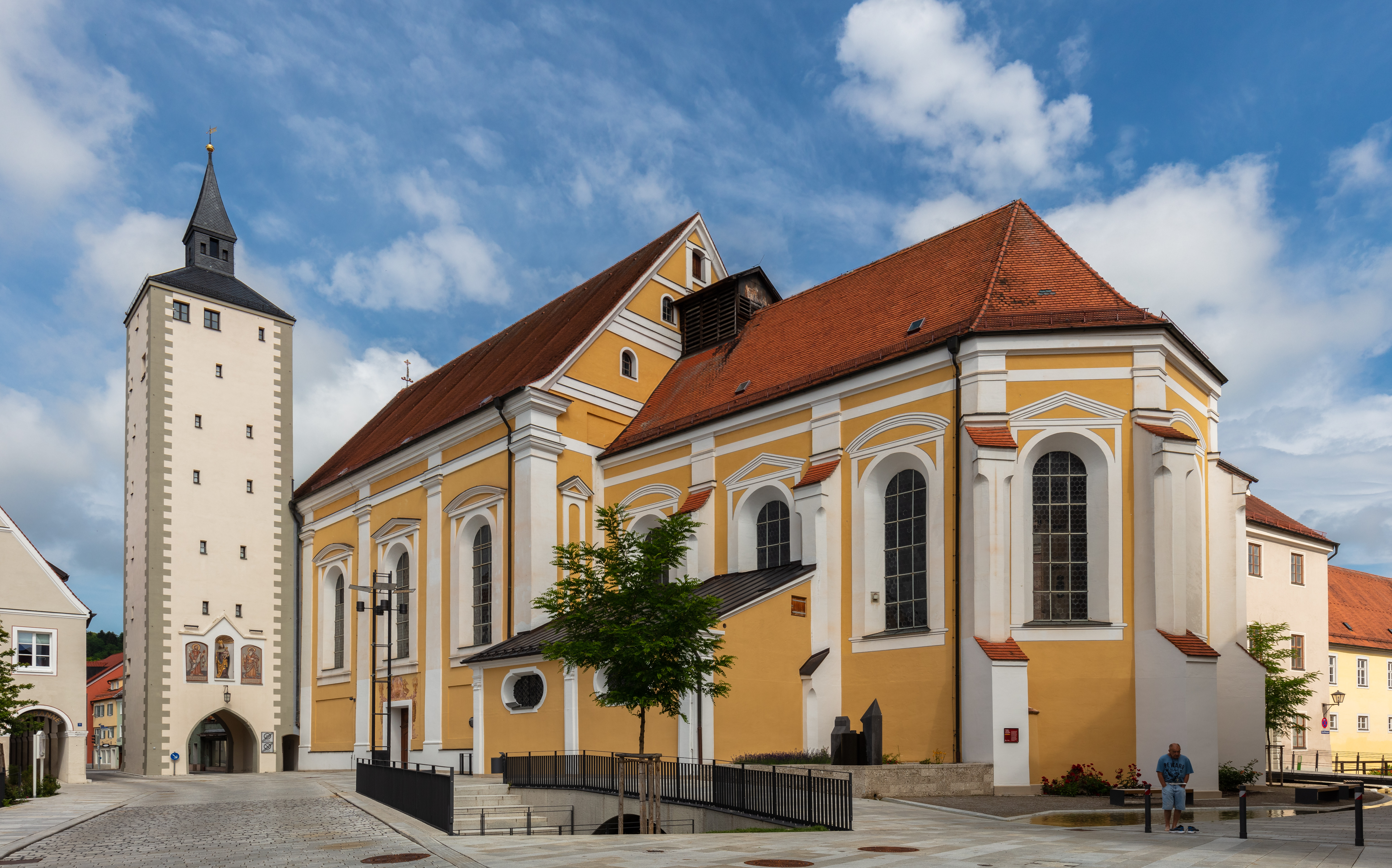
Church of the Annunciation from the southeast with the forelying Franz Xaver Chapel

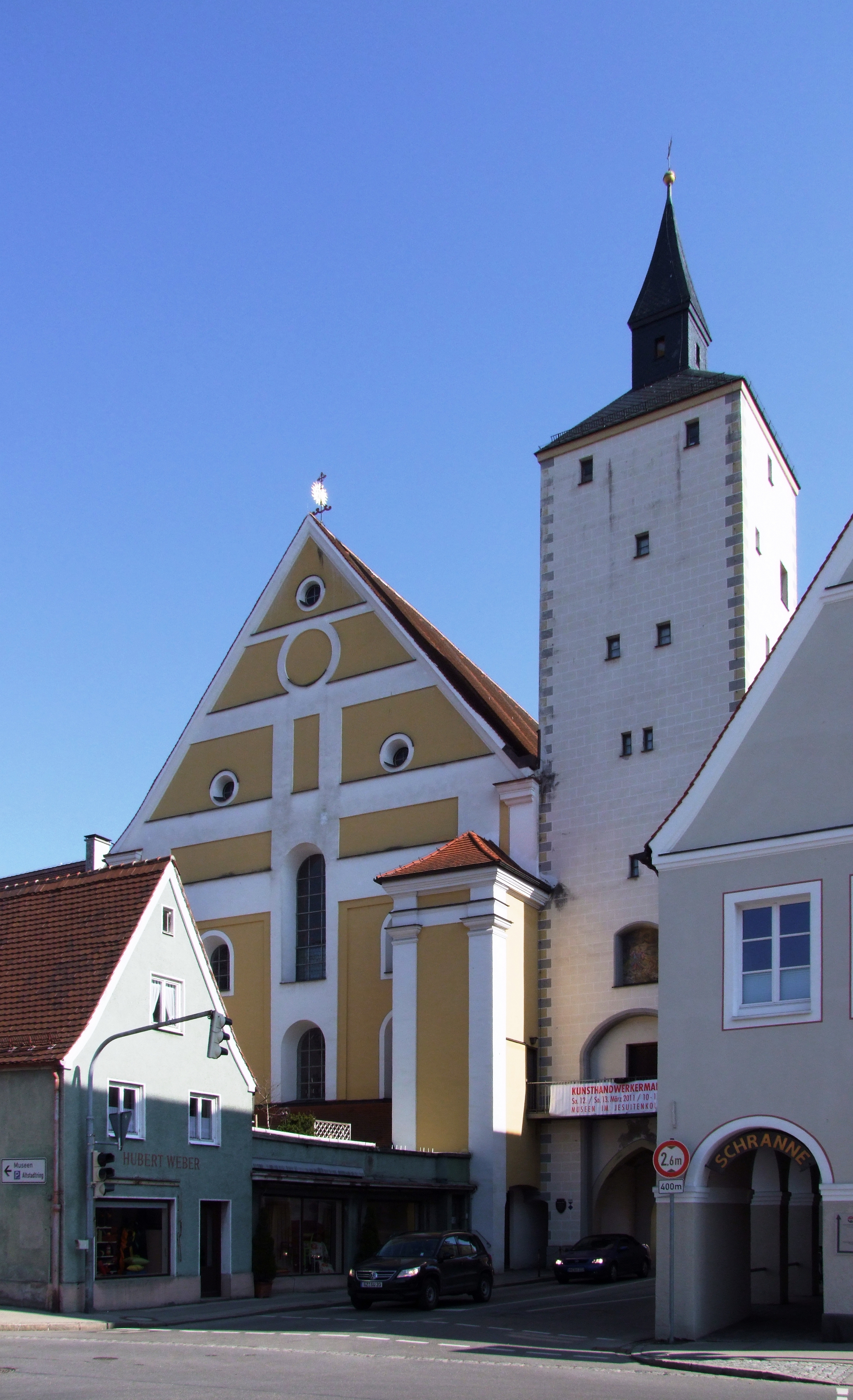
Church of the Annunciation from the west with the Schnäbelinstorturm

Mariä Verkündigung (English: Church of the Annunciation) is a former monastery church in the Upper Swabian district town of Mindelheim in Bavaria, Germany. From the 13th to the 16th century it served as the church of an Augustinian monastery, from the 17th to the 18th century as the church of a Jesuit college, briefly after its dissolution as the church of the Maltese Order, and since the 19th century as a filial church of the Roman Catholic parish of St. Stephen in Mindelheim. The building received its present form in the 18th century.

The Church of the Annunciation is particularly known for its Baroque nativity scene with life-sized figures, which is erected annually during the Christmas season in the choir.

== Location ==
The church is situated at the western end of Mindelheim's old town, directly in front of the Lower Gate (Unteres Tor) on Maximilianstraße, which also contains the main entrance. The west façade abuts the former town wall. The Franz Xaver Chapel, attached to the south side, projects into the pavement. Beneath the sacristy and the chancel flows the river Mindel.

== History ==
=== Period of the Guillemites and Augustinians ===
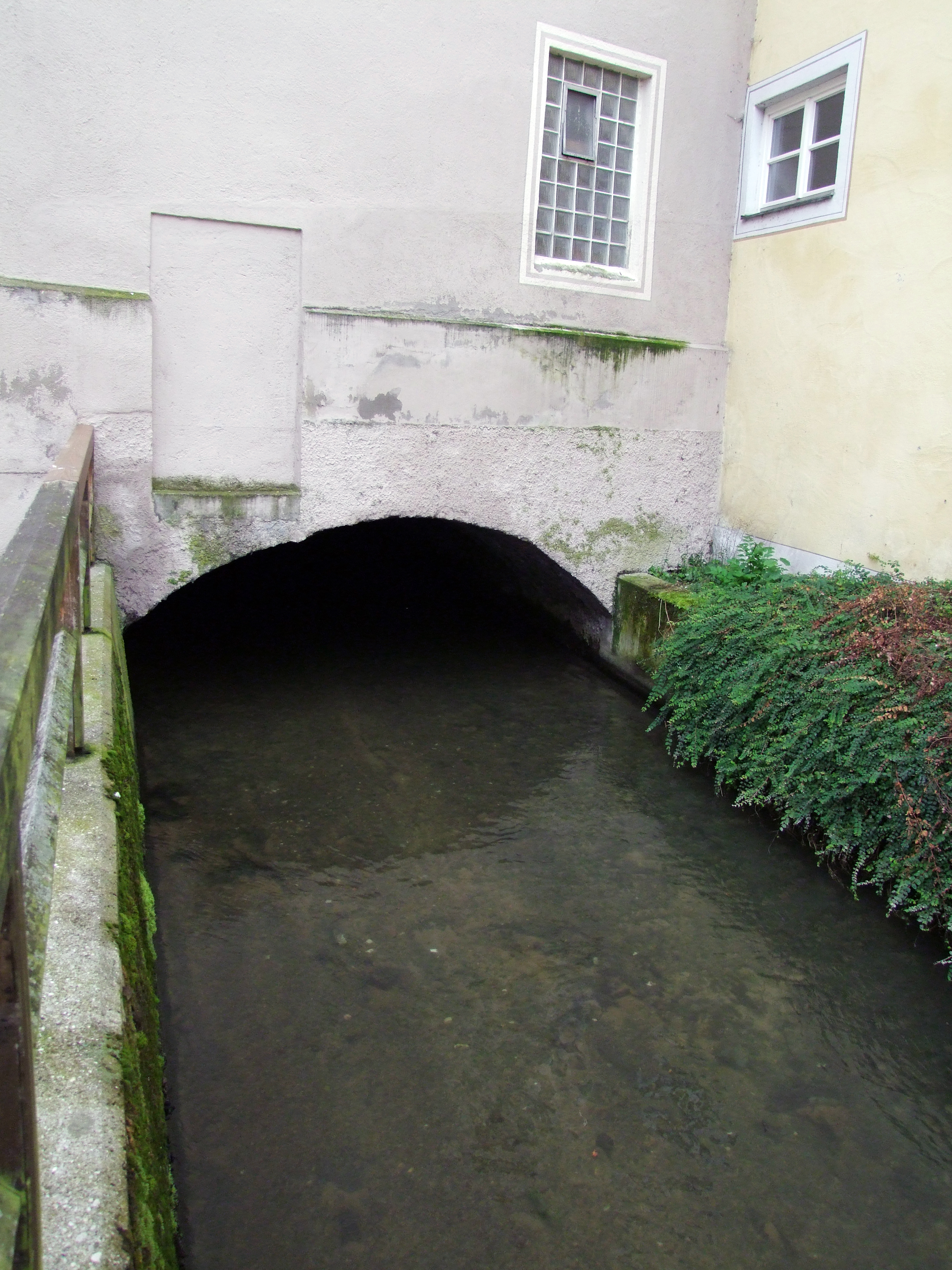
The Mindel below the sacristy

In 1250, Schwigger II von Mindelberg founded a monastery of the Guillemites (Wilhelmiten) in Bedernau; in 1260 the community adopted the Rule of the Augustinian Hermits. On 17 May 1263, Hartmann von Dillingen, Bishop of Augsburg, granted the brothers permission to settle in Mindelheim. In the same year they purchased several houses on the western edge of the small town and erected monastery buildings and a church. The first church was consecrated on 11 May 1264. As early as 1286, a fire completely destroyed both monastery and church. Heinrich III von Mindelberg and his two sons endowed an altar for the reconstruction and donated ten Augsburg pounds of heller annually for ten years. Until the 15th century the church served as the burial place of the Lords of Mindelheim. Around 1460 the order formally adopted the Rule of Saint Augustine.

Major building works on the church and monastery took place in the mid-15th century. To finance the construction of the new rib-vaulted choir – which was larger, more elegant and more solidly built than the former nave – the monks sold one Jauchert (approximately 3,600 m^{2}) of farmland. The choir is attributed to the master builder Konrad Murer. At that time the church contained eleven altars. In 1482 the Auxiliary Bishop of Augsburg, Ulrich, came to Mindelheim to consecrate several altars. Of the late-Gothic furnishings, only a fragment of a carved choir stall cheek survives in the Mindelheim Local History Museum (Heimatmuseum Mindelheim). In 1515 the bones of four Lords of Mindelheim were exhumed at the entrance to the choir; their subsequent fate is unrecorded. In the same year, Emperor Maximilian I donated to the church a two-ell-high (approximately 1.2 m) silver statue of Saint George, which was melted down in 1622.

=== Dissolution of the monastery and takeover by the Jesuits ===
According to the Historia Collegii, the chronicle of the Jesuit college, Martin Luther is said to have visited the monastery in 1518 and preached in a chapel of the church that bore his name until the early 17th century. From 1522 onward the monks began converting to Lutheranism and abandoning the monastery. With the definitive closure of the Augustinian house in 1526, the church lost its status as a monastery church.

As early as 1589, the lord of the manor Christoph Fugger planned to settle Jesuits in the vacant buildings. On 30 June 1618, Duke (later Elector) Maximilian I of Bavaria formally handed the former Augustinian monastery over to the Society of Jesus. Prolonged vacancy had left the complex in serious disrepair. On 29 April 1625 a commission from Munich inspected the site and declared the nave of the church in particular to be in urgent need of reconstruction. The Bavarian electoral treasury bore the majority of the costs for the rebuilding of both church and college, which was directed by the Jesuit lay brother Johannes Holl.

On 3 July 1625 seven altars, tombstones and benches were removed from the old church interior. Six days later demolition of the nave began. The western wall of the church, which abutted the town fortifications, was torn down together with the adjoining stretch of the town wall; the south wall was initially left standing. On 24 August 1625 the city steward Sebastian von Sauerzapf, city pastor Sebald Wachfelder and mayor Hans Knaus laid the foundation stones for a new nave that was to be ten feet longer than its predecessor.

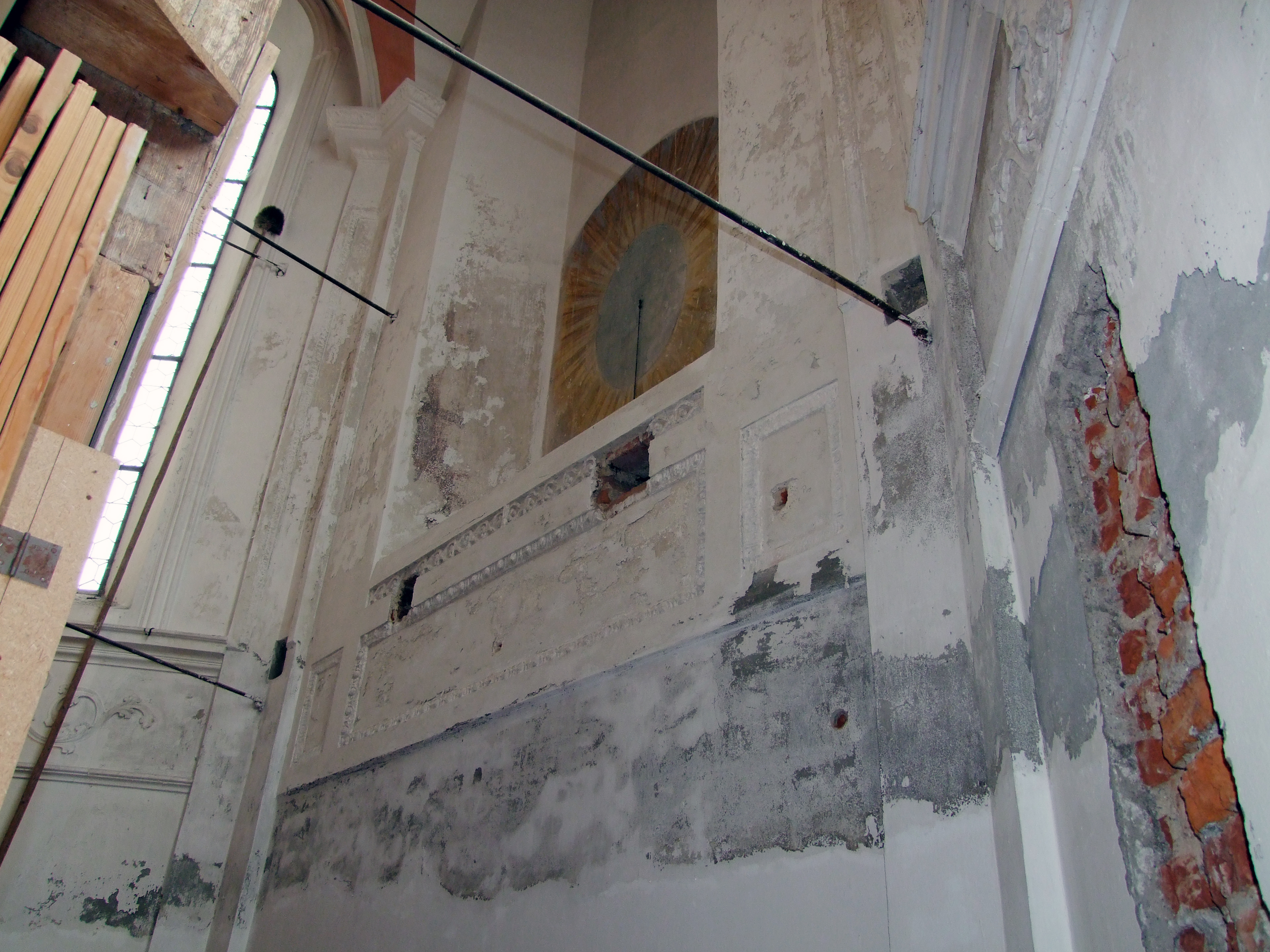
Remains of stucco and paintwork from the 17th century with water damage from the 20th/21st century

By the end of 1625 the west and north walls of the nave were complete. The six choir windows were enlarged and the vaults and walls received stucco decoration. In 1626 the old south wall was demolished and rebuilt. The roof framework of the nave was finished by July 1626. Only three provisional altars were initially installed. On 10 October 1626 the Auxiliary Bishop of Eichstätt, Georg Rösch, consecrated the two side altars. The following day, 11 October 1626, Bishop Heinrich V von Knöringen of Augsburg, assisted by Bishop Rösch and the Prince-Abbot of Kempten, consecrated the church and the high altar.

During the Thirty Years' War, on 17 September 1631, penitential devotions and processions were held to avert the advancing Swedish troops.

After the war the provisional altars were replaced. In 1649 a high altar more than 40 feet tall, by an unknown master, was erected; it was probably polychromed in 1659 by Jakob Staiger of Ottobeuren and fitted with an altarpiece. In 1650 the Prince-Abbot of Kempten donated a Guardian Angel altar. The Confraternity of St Joseph, founded in 1634, financed a St Joseph altar in 1661, the polychromy being paid for by the city magistrates. On 29 June 1661 the Auxiliary Bishop of Augsburg, Kaspar Zeiler, reconsecrated the altars. None of these three altars has survived; only the altarpiece of the St Joseph altar, painted by Christoph Storer, remains and now adorns the present side altar. In 1661 city pastor Johann Sutor donated a pulpit. In 1663 a new organ by a builder from Halle was installed and a cenotaph was erected behind the high altar. Two confessionals near the pulpit were added in 1669.

The Franz Xaver Chapel, attached to the south wall of the choir, was built between 1690 and 1694 at the expense of Duke Maximilian Philipp of Bavaria and his wife Mauritia Febronia. It was consecrated on the feast of St Francis Xavier (3 December) 1704 by Prince-Bishop Alexander Sigismund of Augsburg. The portals on either side of the choir date from 1690, as do a donated antependium and two silver busts for the high altar. In 1706 a bell cage was installed on the choir roof.

=== Reconstruction 1721/22 to the present ===
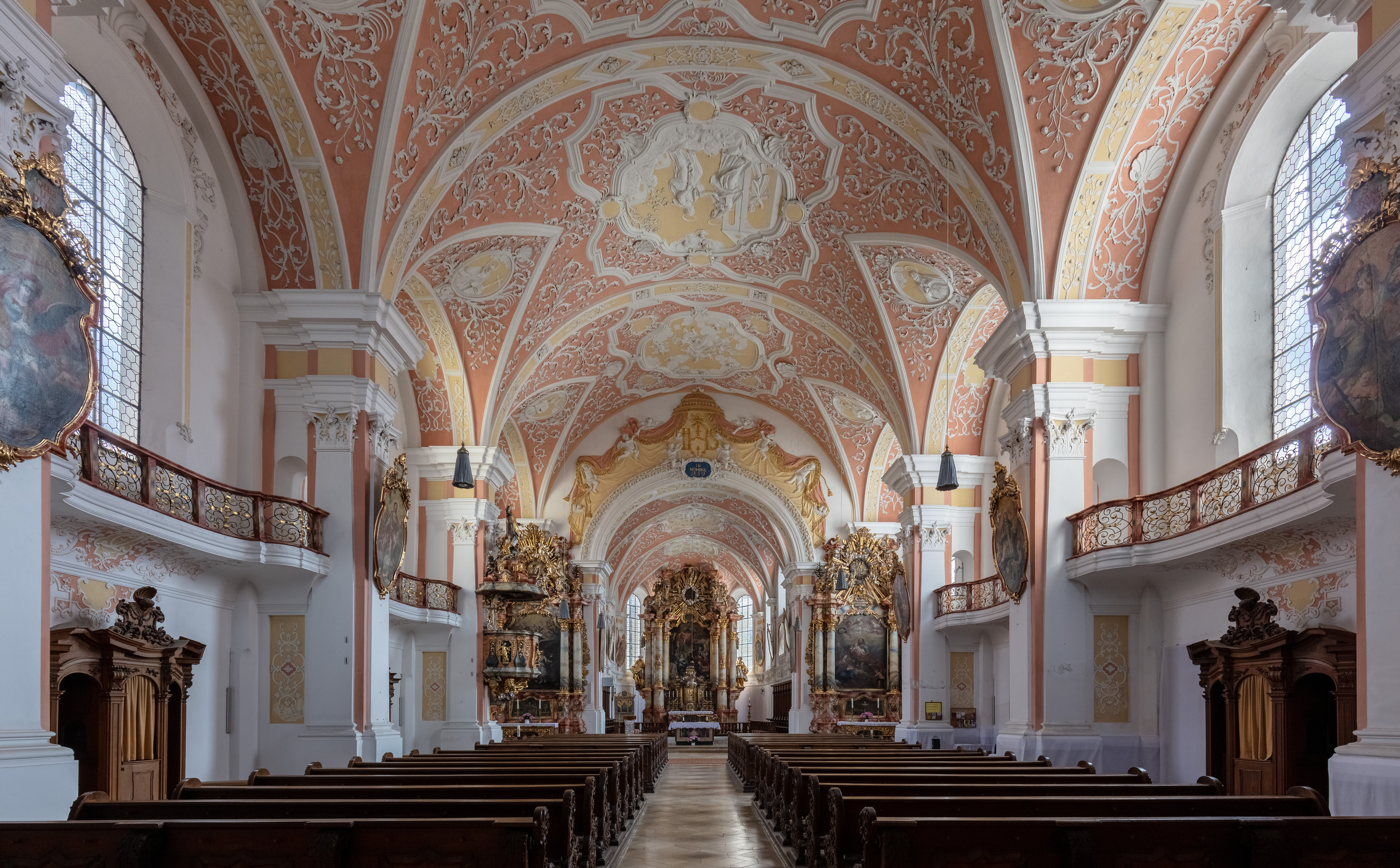
View into the choir room

The Jesuit priest, master builder and architect Joseph Guldimann S.J., who resided at the Mindelheim college from 1720 to 1722, carried out a fundamental rebuilding of the church in 1721–1722. He first arranged for the removal of dilapidated elements: the roof, the nave ceiling and the former gallery together with its spiral staircase. The nave side walls were raised by about 2.5 metres; new wall pilasters were inserted, the windows were made taller and new windows were added on the west side. After the construction of the western vestibule and stair towers, the nave received in 1722 a masonry barrel vault with rich stucco decoration and a new roof. Two new galleries were installed on the west side and received balustrades by 1723. A new pulpit and organ were then installed, and the floor was laid with Solnhofen limestone slabs.

In 1726 ten new confessionals were made and erected; in 1727 the stucco was painted and the pulpit, organ and gallery balustrades were polychromed. The tabernacle acquired for the high altar in 1728 is no longer extant, for between 1734 and 1737 the 17th-century altars were removed and replaced with new Baroque ones. The pilasters and walls, painted in 1736 for 150 guilders, were given a new colour scheme by Italian painters in 1768 and have been repeatedly overpainted during later restorations. In 1743, during the remodelling of the Franz Xaver Chapel, Matthias Willerotter created the stucco work and the altar.

After the suppression of the Jesuit order in 1773, the Bavarian state took possession of both college and church. In 1776 the Carmelites and in 1777 the Dominicans unsuccessfully petitioned the Elector to be granted the former college and church. From 1773 to 1781 the church served as a filial church of the parish church of St Stephen. In 1781 the Sovereign Military Order of Malta took it over, only to return it to the parish in 1808.

On 25 and 26 April 1849 the church hosted the election of the six electors from Mindelheim for the Frankfurt National Assembly.

During a comprehensive restoration between 1904 and 1907, Jakob Brandl enriched the chancel ceiling with stucco reliefs. Because moisture-permeable plaster was used on the walls during another restoration in the 1970s, the interior is currently in poor condition. The planned comprehensive renovation has had to be postponed indefinitely because the Diocese of Augsburg is unable to provide the necessary funding.

== Building description ==
The east-facing, towerless, single-nave church has a nave with a recessed, projecting choir. On the south side, at the level of the first two choir bays, is the Franz Xaver Chapel, and to the north of the choir is an extension with a passageway, from which the sacristy can be reached to the east and the pulpit and gallery staircase to the west. Behind this passageway is the staircase leading to the oratory, the Ignatius Chapel, and the library belonging to the monastery, which is located above the Ignatius Chapel.

=== Exterior ===
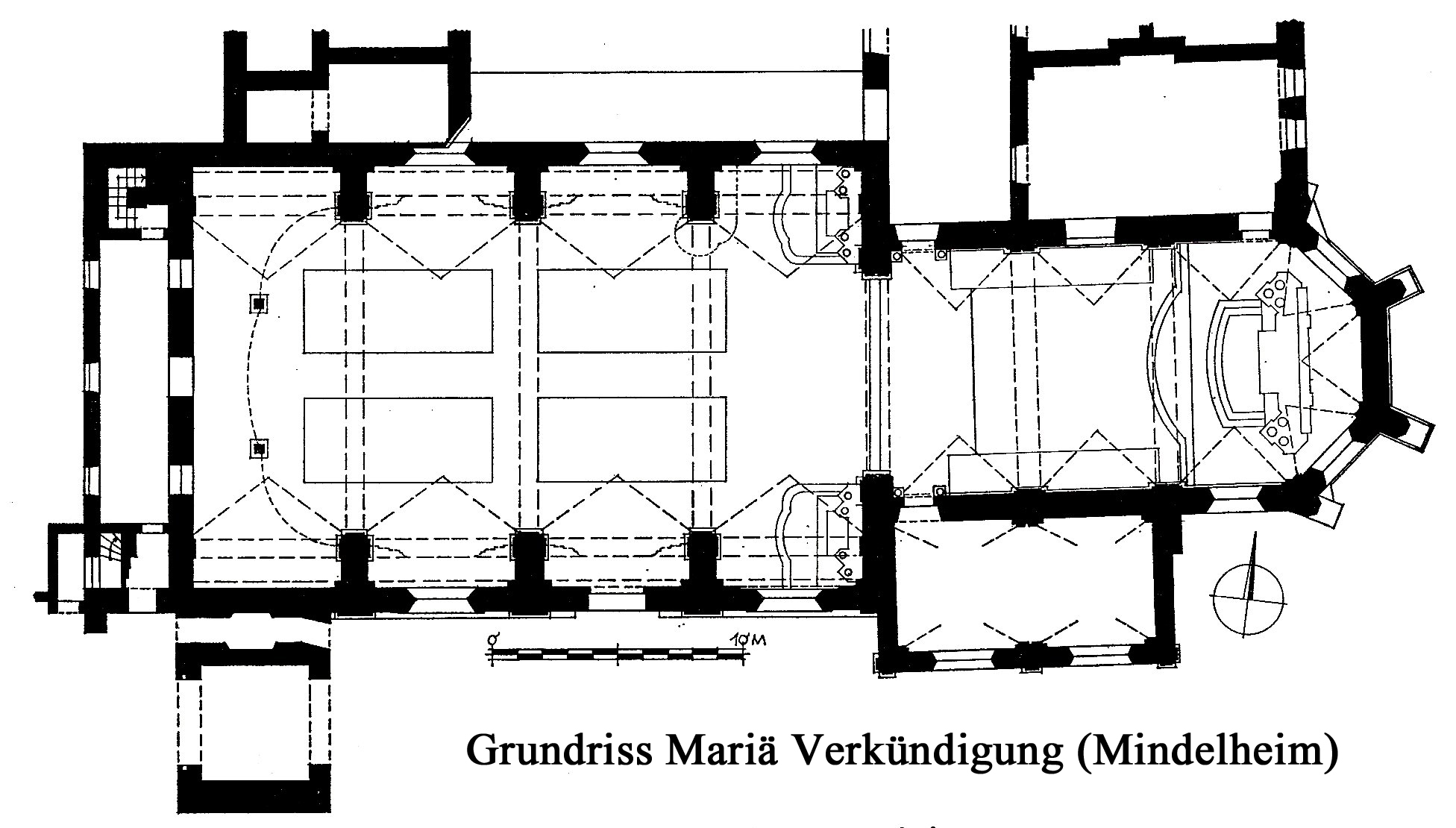
Plan of the church; the Schnäbelinstor (Lower Gate tower) is visible bottom left

The church is oriented to the east, has no tower and is a single-nave (hall) structure consisting of a long nave with a narrower, slightly retracted choir. On the south side, level with the first two choir bays, is the Franz Xaver Chapel. North of the choir is an annex containing a passage room from which the sacristy (to the east) and the stairs to the pulpit and galleries (to the west) are accessed. Behind this passage is the staircase leading to the oratory, the Ignatius Chapel and – above it – the former monastery library.

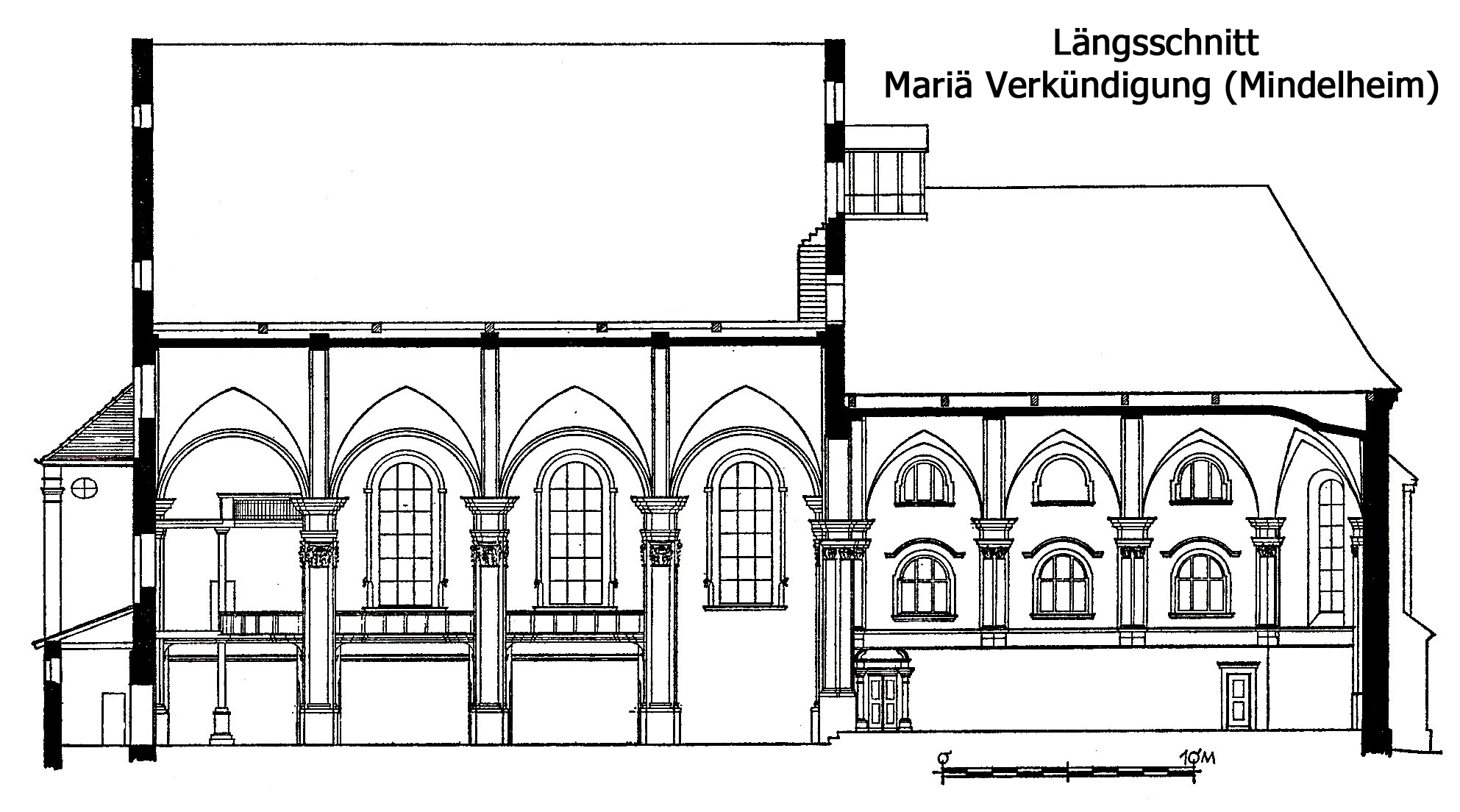
Longitudinal section of the church

The choir has three bays and a five-sided apse. Its apex window is walled up. The light-coloured window surrounds with alternating segmental and triangular pediments date from 1625. On the ridge of the choir roof stands a modern iron bell cage clad in wood, forming a ridge turret. The western side of this turret abuts the higher east wall of the nave. Buttresses with two offsets rise to about two metres below the eaves; the upper offset has chamfered corners and returns to a rectangular plan beneath the coping. Above this, Baroque pilaster strips with painted architrave bands and a cornice run to the eaves.

The nave is a long, rendered hall. The former Jesuit college, of the same eaves height, is built against its north side; the angled buttress of the choir apse is incorporated into this structure and reappears inside the sacristy. The low single-storey Franz Xaver Chapel is attached to the south side of the choir.

The south façade of the nave is articulated in its three eastern bays by Tuscan pilasters and a three-part entablature with cranked sections. Rectangular blind panels are placed in the outer bays below the windows; the taller central panels reach up to the window sills. In the central panel is the rectangular main doorway with an 18th-century painted canopy in fresco technique. Putti at the apex hold a Christogram (IHS); on either side are cornucopias with hanging floral garlands. The windows have moulded surrounds. The central axis is crowned by a shallow triangular pediment, while the side axes have segmental pediments. The tower of the Lower Gate (Unteres Tor) abuts the south side of the nave.

The exterior of the sacristy is a plain rectangular block with a gable roof that bridges the Mindel river. The monastery entrance on the east side of this block is decorated with pilasters and a round-arched pediment. Above the windows are alternating stucco segmental and triangular pediments. At the western end of the otherwise half-hipped east gable sits a pointed-gable ridge turret containing three bells.

=== Interior ===
The choir measures 9.6 m in width and 20 m in length. Its original Gothic rib vault was removed in the 18th century; the present neo-Baroque stucco decoration covers a barrel vault with lunette-like penetrations (Stichkappentonne). The vault is divided by slightly pointed transverse arches; the wall arches are parabolic. A broad dado zone runs below the windows. In front of this stand shallow wall pilasters, and in front of these, on volute consoles, paired Corinthian pilasters with shared three-part entablatures. Only single pilasters flank the chancel arch. The three windows of the polygonal apse are tall round-arched openings; the central one forms a shallow niche. On the north side, three round-arched windows at first-floor level belong to the Ignatius Chapel, with three further windows (the middle one blind) above them opening into the former monastery library. The three south windows, which rise above the roof of the Franz Xaver Chapel, are also round-arched. All windows contain clear hexagonal quarries.

Below the south windows, framed oil paintings are set into the wall. Immediately beside the chancel arch are richly decorated stucco portals: one leading to the Franz Xaver Chapel, the other to the passage giving access to the sacristy and the Ignatius Chapel above it. The chancel arch itself is set back and semicircular in plan, with paired pilasters on the jambs and cranked entablature at impost level.

The nave is approximately 27 m long, 16.6 m wide and 15 m high. Its barrel vault with lunettes rises to about 12 m, slightly higher than that of the choir. A double-storey west gallery is built in, the upper level serving as the organ loft. A continuous gallery at mid-height runs along both long sides as far as the shallow side chapels at the east end. The nave is divided into four bays by a stichkappen barrel vault articulated by transverse arches. The two eastern side chapels (2.3 m in diameter) are covered by narrow transverse barrels. The wall pilasters terminate in strongly tapering Corinthian pilasters on three sides, above which runs a three-part cranked entablature. Short cornice fragments appear on the east wall on either side of the chancel arch.

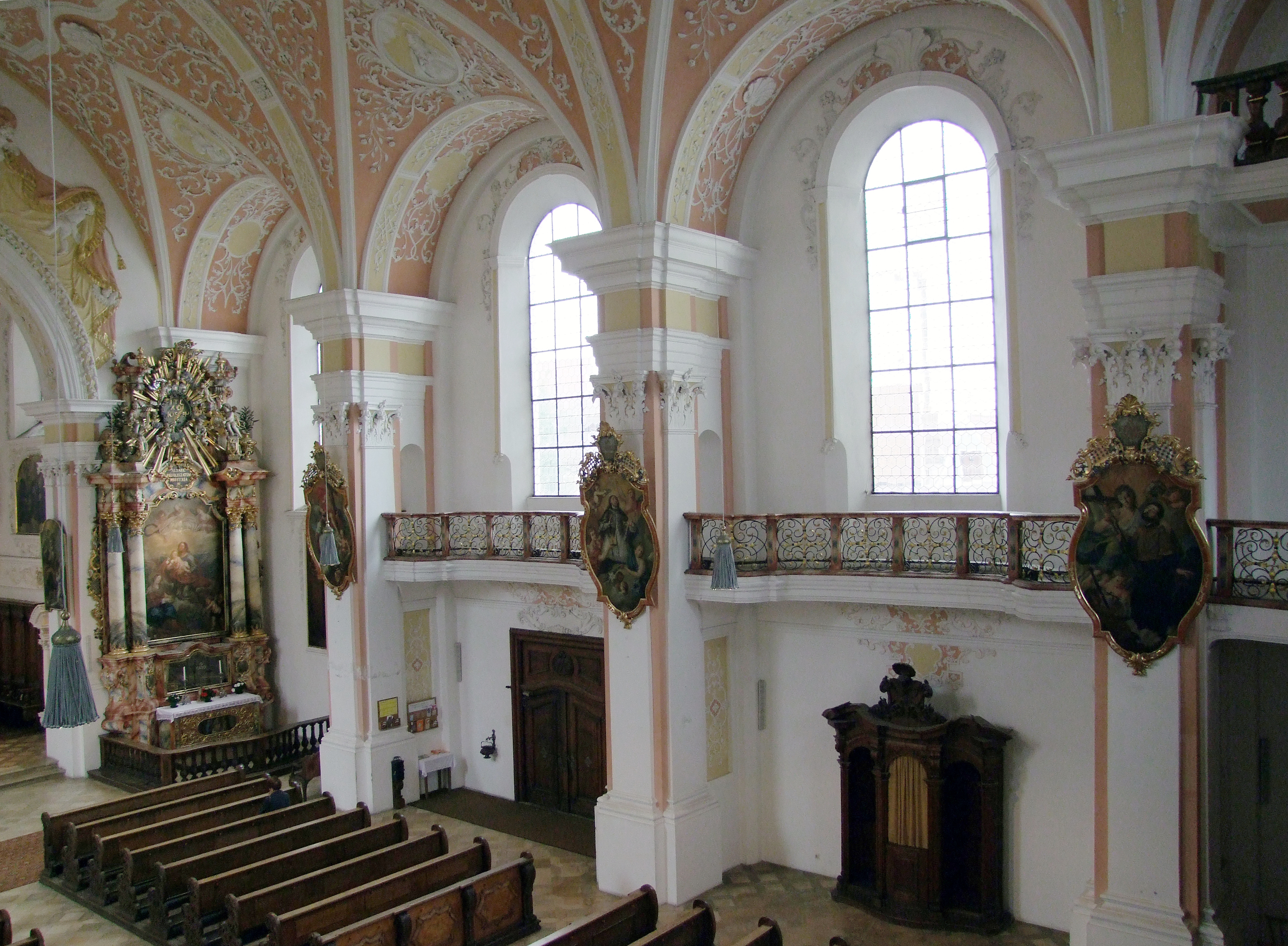
The southern nave

Above the gallery the narrow zone between pilaster and outer wall is pierced by round-arched openings. The gallery sweeps forward in richly curved forms across the three western bays; it is absent in the eastern bay, giving the side chapels a cruciform plan. In the two central bays the gallery projects on coving; its balustrade consists of red-marbled wood with wrought-iron spiral grilles and gilded leaf ornament. On the west wall a second gallery at the level of the main entablature serves as the organ loft.

In the three eastern bays, large round-arched windows rise high into the lunettes. The main entrance is on the south side, in the second bay from the east. The large rectangular portal, with a door that opens only to two-thirds height, is the church's only direct external access. The softly curved double doors are panelled, with baluster-shaped meeting stiles and original ironwork. The portal surround was renewed in neo-Baroque style up to lintel height.

Beneath the west gallery a rectangular central doorway opens into the single-storey vestibule, which has a flat roof and is built against the façade. The vestibule has three horizontal oval windows on the west wall and side entrances to the staircases that flank it and lead to the galleries. A passage at ground-floor level on the west side of the nave gives access to these two staircases.

== Furnishings ==
The interior furnishings of the church date predominantly from the 18th century. The ceilings are not frescoed but decorated with figurative stucco reliefs; those in the choir were only added at the beginning of the 20th century. Only a small remnant of the original 17th- or 18th-century painting and stucco survives behind the high altar in a blind window, where an oval rayed glory on a blue ground can still be seen. The floor throughout is laid with Solnhofen limestone slabs in a rose-point pattern dating from 1723.

=== Stucco reliefs ===
All the figurative stucco reliefs in the vault apexes depict Marian subjects and are designed to be viewed from the high altar.

==== Choir ====
The neo-Baroque stucco reliefs on the choir ceiling were created in 1907 by Jakob Bradl (or Brandl) from Munich. In the apex of each of the three bays is a square field with broken, curved frames. The eastern relief shows the Lamentation of Christ by his Mother beneath the empty Cross; the central one depicts Mary as Queen of the Rosary; the western bay illustrates the Coronation of the Virgin. Each main relief is flanked by two oval medallions in the lunettes. The medallions in the central bay show the Sacred Heart of Jesus and the Immaculate Heart of Mary; the others portray Church Fathers with their attributes – on the north side St Jerome with the lion and St Augustine with a flaming heart, on the south St Gregory the Great with tiara and dove, and St Ambrose with a beehive.

==== Nave ====
The stucco reliefs on the nave ceiling date from 1722 and are possibly the work of Michael Stiller of Ettringen. The four principal reliefs are set in quatrefoil-shaped fields. As in the choir, each main relief is accompanied by two oval medallions containing half-length figures of saints in the lunettes. The subjects are arranged chronologically from west to east: the Immaculate Conception of Mary, the Marriage of the Virgin and St Joseph, the Visitation, and finally the Assumption of Mary. The medallions in the western bay above the organ loft are devoted to music and show King David with the harp on the north side and St Cecilia playing the organ opposite. The remaining medallions moving eastward depict Jesuit saints: on the north side Saints Aloysius Gonzaga, probably Francis Borgia, and Ignatius of Loyola; on the south Saints Francis Xavier, a Jesuit with a burning heart, and Stanislaus Kostka.

=== Altars ===
The church contains three altars: the high altar at the east end of the choir and two side altars flanking the chancel arch. The north side altar is dedicated to the Guardian Angel, the south one to St Joseph.

==== High altar ====
The high altar, created in 1737, completely fills the eastern wall of the choir. Its authorship is not definitively documented, but it is generally attributed to a member of the Bergmüller family of artists from Türkheim. The woodwork is marbled in olive-green to red tones, with most ornament gilded.

The block-like altar mensa has an antependium painted in oils within a gilded acanthus frame. The visible front shows the Mystic Wine Press: Christ stands bent beneath the cross in the centre of a winepress; soldiers pierce his side and angels collect the flowing blood. The scene extends into landscape vignettes – vine harvest on the left, the jaws of Hell on the right. The reverse (not visible) depicts the Flagellation of Christ, with the Virgin and St John on the left and an Ecce Homo on the right.

The large brass tabernacle structure with silvered decoration was made in 1787 by the Mindelheim coppersmith Plazidus Sauter, originally for the parish church of St Stephen. The design drawing survives in the Augsburg State Archives. It was transferred to Mariä Verkündigung in 1865 during the renovation of St Stephen. The cylindrical tabernacle has a niche containing a crucifix flanked by Ionic columns and concave side wings. Kneeling angels and volutes frame the sides; the cranked entablature is hung with garlands and triglyphs. At the apex is the Lamb of God on the book with seven seals; a cartouche bears the inscription ECCE AGNUS DEI ("Behold the Lamb of God").

The large curved altarpiece, painted in 1736 by the local artist Franz Anton Germiller, depicts the Annunciation. The Virgin kneels at a prie-dieu on the lower left, her right hand pointing to the word Ecce in an open book. She turns toward the Archangel Gabriel, who descends holding a lily and raising his right hand in oath. Above, God the Father and the Holy Spirit as a dove send a beam of light toward Mary. A floral and fruit-decorated cartouche above the painting reads AVE MARIA GRATIA PLENA ("Hail Mary, full of grace").

The architectural frame consists of staggered pilasters and six free-standing Corinthian columns (the two central ones taller and placed forward on decorated cylindrical pedestals). The columns are linked by pilaster surfaces and a continuous cranked entablature. On consoles beside the columns stand neo-Baroque figures of St Ignatius Loyola (left) and St Francis Xavier (right) by the Munich sculptor H. Kosenbach. The altar extract is flanked by inward-slanting volutes; in the centre a cartouche in a cloud and ray glory bears the inscription ALTARE PRIVILEGIATUM. Eleven putti on the crowning entablature hold a flower garland.

==== Side altars ====
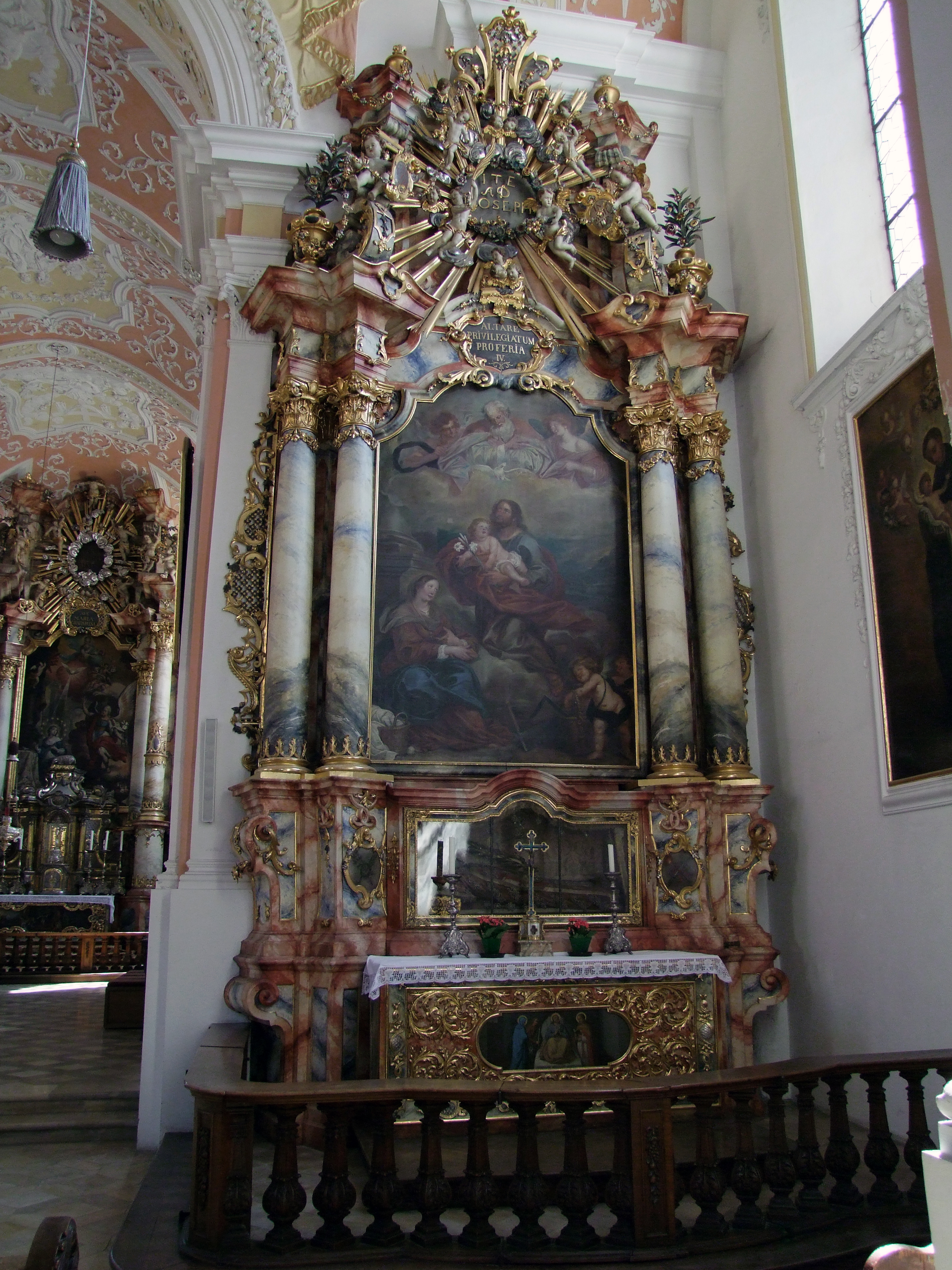
The southern side altar

The two almost identical side altars flanking the chancel arch were very probably created in 1734–1735 by the same master who made the high altar (most likely a member of the Bergmüller workshop from Türkheim), though no archival evidence confirms this. Each has a block-like mensa. The antependia are late-19th-century paintings framed by acanthus carving. In the predella is a wide glazed reliquary shrine flanked by small painted coats of arms on the columns and, in front, a silvered crucifix. Until the 1970s restoration, small oval canvases were visible above the shrines: St Aloysius Gonzaga on the north altar and St Stanislaus Kostka on the south.

The large curved altarpieces are flanked by two pairs of diagonally placed columns. Cranked entablature sections and applied banderole-and-lattice work on the outer faces complete the structure. The extracts are flanked by putti holding inscribed volutes; flower vases stand above the outer columns. At the centre of each extract is a large radiant glory with clouds and angel heads surrounding a central inscription. The altars are separated from the nave by low balustrades.

==== Guardian Angel altar (north) ====
The north side altar is dedicated to the Guardian Angel. Its antependium shows the Dormition of the Virgin surrounded by ten Apostles. The reliquary contains a brocade-dressed wooden figure of the Madonna and two skull relics of the martyrs Innocentius and Victor in monastic reliquary busts on brass bases. The small cartouches on the outer columns bear (left) a painted Annunciation with the word CONGREGATIONIS and (right) the arms of Mindelheim (a bell) with the inscription CIVICAE, indicating that this was the altar of the citizens' confraternity.

The large altarpiece was painted in 1735 by Franz Anton Germiller. It depicts a guardian angel guiding a small white-robed child who holds a lily. The upper part is filled with putti, the two central ones holding a flower wreath. At the very top is the Eye of Providence within a halo – symbol of the Holy Trinity. The cartouche above the painting reads ALTARE PRIVILEGIATVM PROFERIA II. The central inscription in the extract, from Psalm 91 (90), reads ANGELIS SVIS ... CVSTODIANT TE ... MANDAVIT ("He has given his angels charge over you to guard you in all your ways").

==== St Joseph altar (south) ====
The south side altar is dedicated to St Joseph. Its antependium depicts the Death of St Joseph: the saint lies on his bed, attended by the Virgin (left), a youth, and a haloed priest (right). The reliquary contains the skull relic of the martyr Vincentius in a monastic bust. The small cartouches show (left) laurel wreath, palm and olive branch, and (right) sword and torch – attributes of martyrdom. The large altarpiece, painted in 1660 by Johann Christoph Storer from Konstanz and thus the oldest surviving painting in the church, shows the Holy Family: St Joseph in the foreground holds the Christ Child and a lily; the Virgin sits to the left. Above, God the Father looks down, flanked by angels; a dove representing the Holy Spirit sends rays of light toward Joseph. The cartouche above the painting reads ALTARE PRIVILEGIATUM PROFERIA IV. The central inscription in the extract is ITE AD IOSEPH IN VITA IN MORTE ("Go to Joseph in life and in death").

=== Pulpit ===
The pulpit, attached to the easternmost pier on the north side of the nave, was carved in 1722 and polychromed in 1727. The main surfaces are marbled in red and green; the rich banderole ornament is gilded and silvered. The cylindrical pulpit body has a heavily cranked parapet. Beneath it, a large scrolling console bears the symbols of the Four Evangelists: the winged man (Matthew) on the west side in gilded robes with silvered and gilded wings; beside him the gilded lion, ox and eagle.

On the east side the parapet projects in a balcony-like form as far as the pier, articulated by sturdy baluster pilasters hung with flowers. In niches between them stand three statues, believed to represent (left to right) St Francis of Assisi, the Prophet Elijah and St John the Baptist. On the back wall of the pulpit is a cartouche in a gilded frame with the inscription EXIVIT SONVS EORVM (from Psalm 19:5 – "Their voice has gone out to all the earth").

The sounding board takes the form of a cranked entablature surmounted by a volute pyramid supported by two putti. The pyramid is adorned at the base with four putti symbolising the continents, distinguished mainly by their head-dresses: Africa (a black putto with quiver and feather crown holding an arrowhead), America (with lance and conquistador helmet), Europe (presenting a crown on a cushion), and Asia (wearing a turban with crescent and holding a lance). At the very top stands a figure of St Ignatius of Loyola on a globe, wearing a gilded chasuble over a silvered alb. An angel at his right points in an open book to the Jesuit motto OMNIA AD MAIOREM DEI GLORIAM ("All for the greater glory of God").

=== Choir stalls ===
The choir stalls were made around 1626 and are attributed to the Jesuit lay brother and master builder Johannes Holl. They are a simplified copy of the 1596 stalls in the Jesuit church of St Michael in Munich and belong to a clearly defined group of late-Renaissance choir stalls in Upper German Jesuit churches. The presence of choir stalls in these churches is noteworthy, since the Jesuits did not practise communal choral prayer and outside the Upper German province such furnishings were exceptional.

The stalls are left unpainted and have clear, severe forms. Ten stalls line each side; access is via an opening at the fifth bay from the east. The front parapet is divided by pilasters with volute capitals and rectangular panels. The seats, separated by armrests on voluted balustrades, are tip-up. The high back wall is articulated by Corinthian pilasters framing panels edged with leaf moulding and slender blind arcades with impost cornice and keystones. The whole is crowned by a three-part entablature with bulging frieze added around 1720–1730.

=== Oil paintings ===
Six large paintings of saints by the local artist Joseph Anton Dobler (c. 1737) hang on the choir pilasters. Each saint is identified by an inscription in the top cartouche and by attributes or characteristic scenes. The paintings are set in curved frames and tilted forward. Each includes a coat of arms or symbolic reference to a particular territory and a ribbon bearing a single Latin imperative word expressing a petition to the saint.

North

South
St. Anne

Town of Mindelheim (coat of arms)

LIBERA (liberate)

St. Elizabeth

Electorate of Bavaria (coat of arms)

CONFIRMA (strengthen)

St. James the Younger

Emperor and Empire (double-headed imperial eagle)

PACIFICA (make peace)

St. John the Baptist

Pope and Church (tiara and keys of St. Peter in front of a globe)

AMPLIFICA (expand)

St. Joachim

Jesuit College Mindelheim (building view)

ROBORA (strength)

St. Zacharias

Swabia (coat of arms with the three Staufer lions)

CONSERVA (preserve)

=== Nativity scene ===
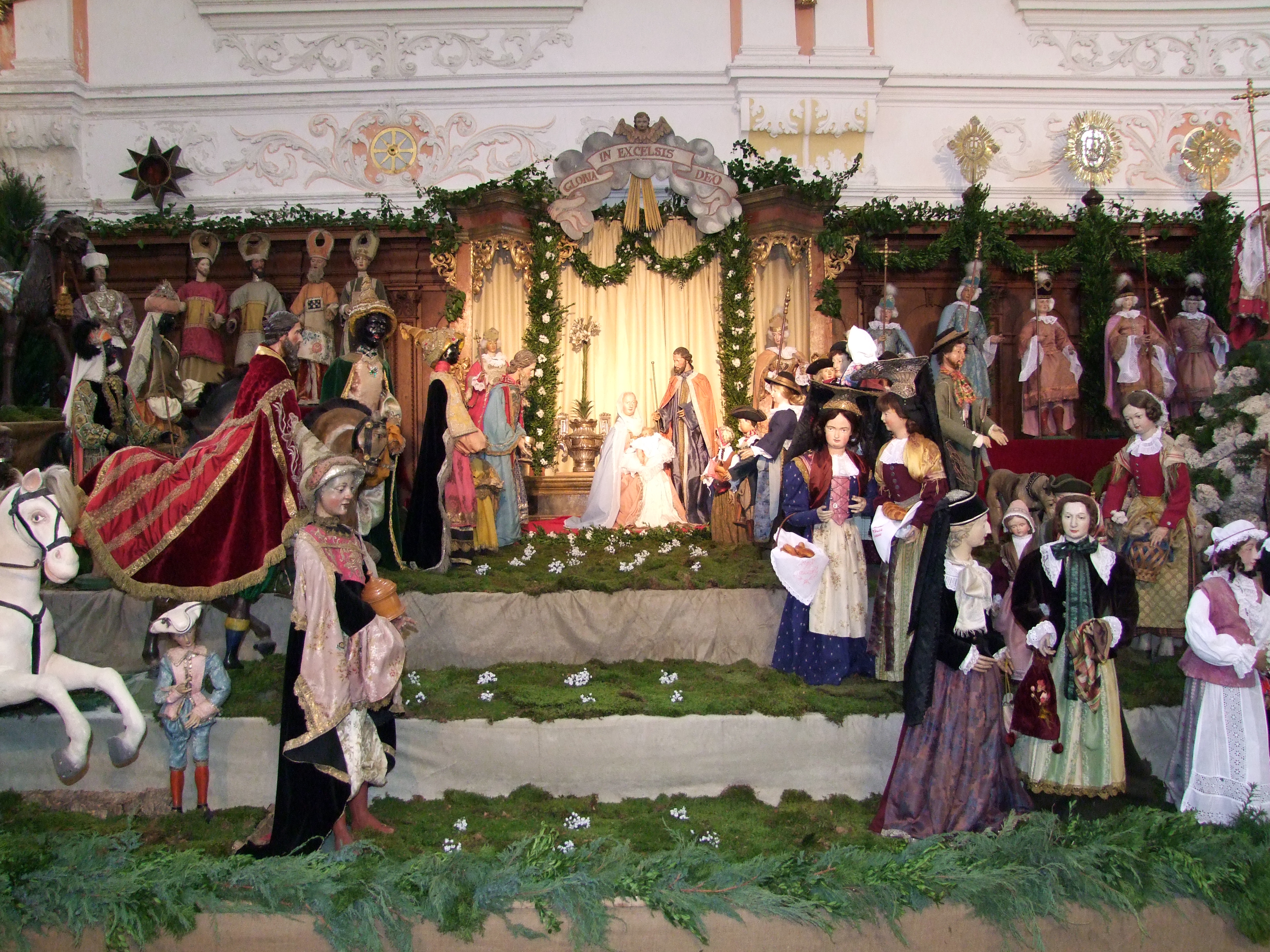
Jesuit nativity scene in the choir room

The large Baroque nativity scene (Jesuitenkrippe) is the church's most famous feature. The tradition began in 1618 when the Jesuits first erected a crib with roughly life-size figures. Over the following decades the scene was repeatedly enlarged and renewed. The exact original number of figures is unknown, but approximately 80 historic dressed wooden figures survive and are displayed annually in the choir during the Christmas season.

The present arrangement shows shepherds, Mindelheim citizens and peasants approaching from the right, and the Three Kings with a large retinue including war elephants from the left, all converging on the central stable. The Queen of Sheba on a white horse also rides toward Bethlehem. Originally the figures were probably displayed in separate scenes (Annunciation to Mary, Search for Lodging, Annunciation to the Shepherds, Adoration of the Shepherds and of the Magi). The only additional scene now securely attested is the Marriage at Cana (kept separately). The painted backdrop dates from the 1960s and is not historic.

A smaller 18th-century nativity scene from the former monastery of Klosterwald, depicting the Marriage at Cana, is preserved in a cabinet in the sacristy antechamber and displayed only during Advent.

=== Other furnishings ===
Numerous other fittings remain. The limestone stoup near the sacristy door by the chancel arch is inscribed 17 IHS 40. The copper holy-water basins by the south entrance, decorated with rocaille, date from the mid-18th century, as does the carved wooden collection box on a voluted baluster foot. The hanging sanctuary lamp in the centre of the choir (mid-18th century) is silver with pierced rocaille ornament.

==== Sacristy ====
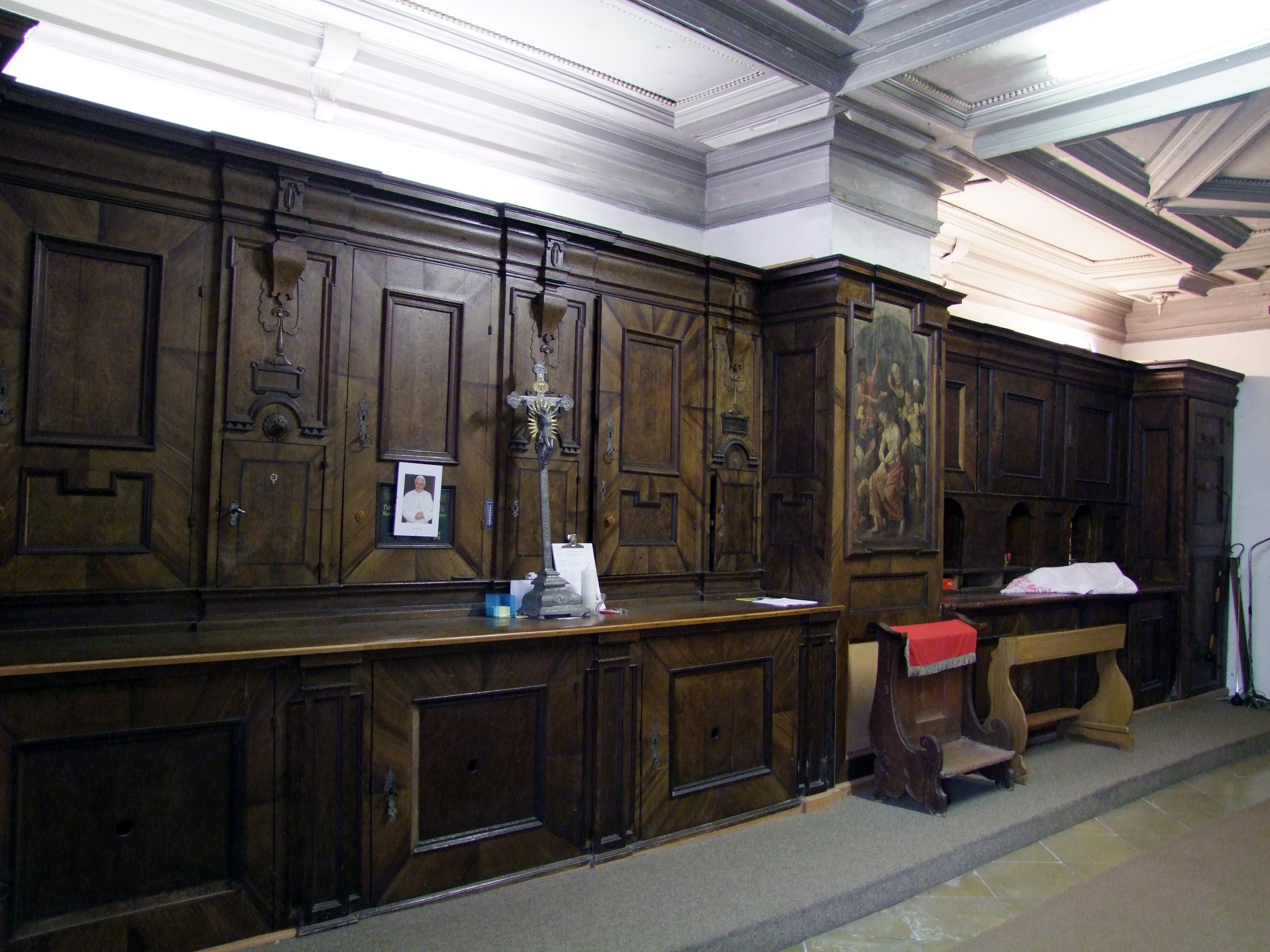
The cabinet on the south wall of the sacristy

The south wall of the sacristy is entirely occupied by a large nine-bay intarsia-inlaid cupboard. A connecting panel masks the central column. A small mid-18th-century prie-dieu has scrolling feet and rocaille carving. The lower chests are separated by Tuscan pilasters; the upper cupboards are set back with sprung doors and cranked entablature with bulging frieze. In the eastern half the upper doors are framed by eared panels with simple grotesque ornament; in the western half by panelled pilasters. The masked central column bears a late-16th-century panel painting of the Crowning with Thorns (heavily damaged). Several damaged inscriptions are visible on the doors; the central door of the eastern section has a small early-18th-century ivory crucifix.

On the north wall is a 1722 cupboard with panelled doors and bulging entablature frieze. At the east end hangs a damaged late-16th-century semicircular panel of the Last Supper signed H. K.. Other items include a simple mid-18th-century six-drawer chest, a mid-18th-century sedile with scrolling feet and rocaille carving upholstered in red damask, several 18th-century processional and small crucifixes (one with skull and serpent, one with silvered bronze corpus, one with Resurrection Christ), a c. 1500 processional cross with trefoil ends and carved Evangelist symbols, and paintings including an Immaculata attributed to Joseph Ruffini of Merano, and mid-18th-century images of St Francis Xavier and probably St John Nepomuk.

==== Sacristy antechamber ====
The antechamber between sacristy and choir contains an early-18th-century wall crucifix with a mid-18th-century Mater Dolorosa below it. To the left stands St Joachim, to the right St Anne with the Virgin as a child (late 17th century). Two early-18th-century arched wooden panels show the Mater Dolorosa and the Man of Sorrows. In front stands a modern people's altar. In a cabinet on the north side, opened only during Advent, is kept the Klosterwald Marriage-at-Cana nativity scene.

== Chapels ==
=== Franz Xaver Chapel ===
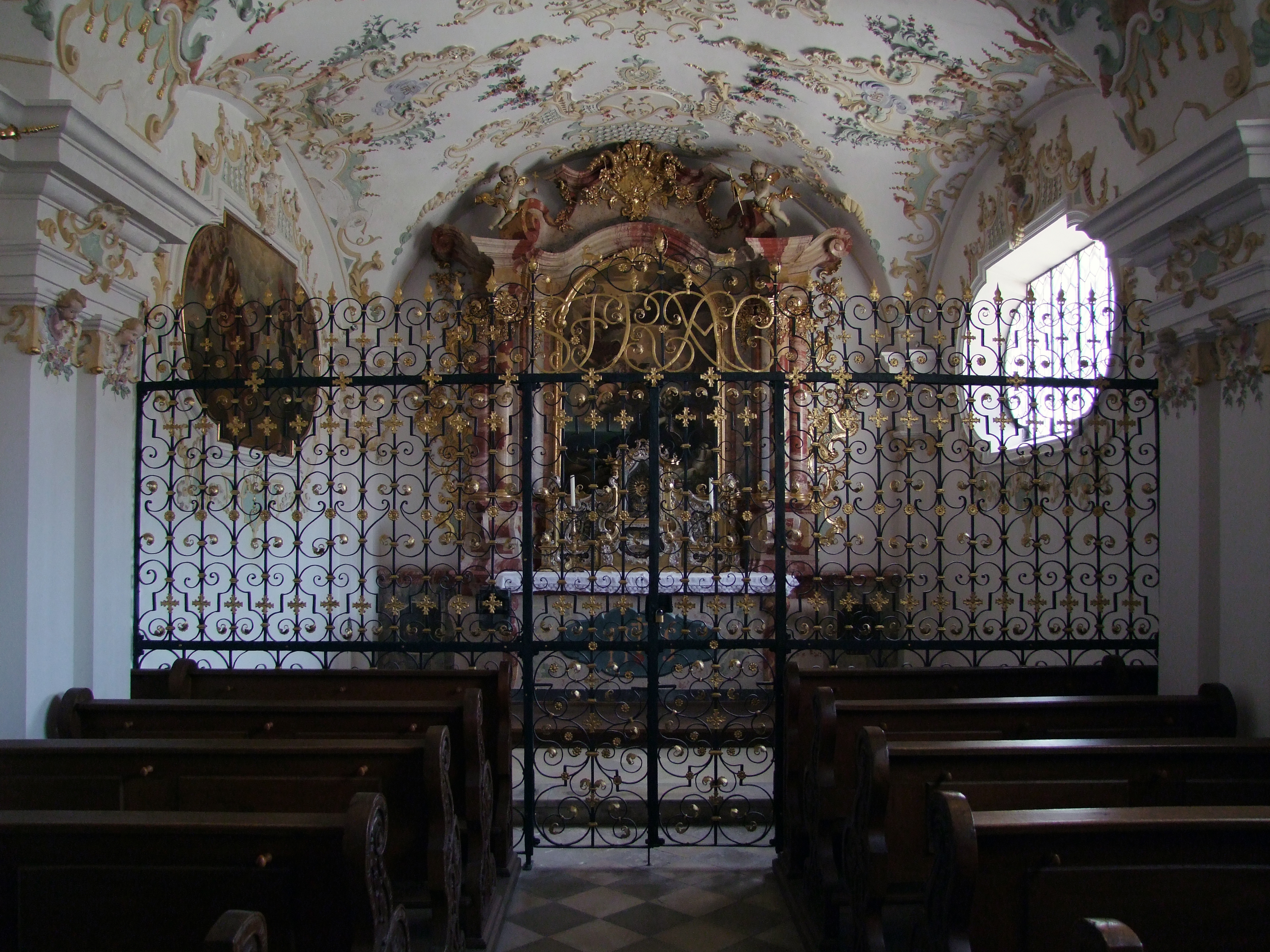
Franz Xaver Chapel

The Franz Xaver Chapel, built onto the south side of the choir, was begun in 1690 and consecrated to St Francis Xavier in 1704. The east-oriented rectangular space has two bays with a pitched roof covered in sheet metal. The bays are separated by broad, flat wall pilasters carrying paired pilasters and a three-part cranked entablature. The corners have half-pilasters; in the northwest corner only a cornice fragment remains, as this is the location of the round-arched stucco-framed niche that forms the sole entrance from the choir. The half-barrel vault has broad, apex-flattened lunettes carried over shallow wall arches. Only the south wall has two transverse rectangular windows with inset round-arched sides.

The altar area is separated from the rest of the chapel by an ornate wrought-iron grille made in 1751 by an unknown smith. It consists of vertical bars with gilded leaf finials, flowers and cross-shaped rosettes; the gabled central section bears the monogram of St Francis Xavier.

The altar (1743) by the local master Matthias Willerotter is made of red, yellow and blue-grey scagliola. The mensa is flanked by volutes; the antependium shows banderole work and the Christogram IHS. On the mensa stands a gilded tabernacle-like reliquary shrine with silvered rocaille decoration. It has three bays with glazed compartments one above the other. The central compartment contains an arm relic of St Francis Xavier; above it a monstrance with the Sacred Heart of Jesus, below a silvered pelican (symbol of Christ). The altarpiece (c. 1743, artist unknown) shows the dying saint leaning against a rock, clutching a crucifix. Angels hover above in a cloudy sky. The extract, under cranked entablature, features a gilded medallion with a carved crab emerging from water carrying a cross – an allusion to the legend that a crab returned St Francis Xavier's crucifix lost at sea.

The predominantly white, red and green stucco was created in 1743 by Matthias Willerotter from Mindelheim. It already belongs to the early Rococo phase. It consists of symmetrical cartouches, banderole work, lattice work, flower chains and branches. In the middle there is a curved profile frame with a painting field. Large cartouches with fully plastic flower vases and an angel's head are located in the middle of the long sides. The four lunettes of the chapel ceiling bear stucco reliefs of the four continents. At the upper edge of each there is a cloud with the Christ monogram IHS, in front of which a putto who embodies the continent kneels. North of the altar on the east side stands a putto for Europe, who holds in his right hand a pilgrim's staff, a pontifical staff and a crozier. His left hand points to the Christ monogram IHS. A crown with sceptre lies to the left of the putto on a cushion. South of the altar is the cartouche with Asia. The kneeling putto humbly holds his hands crossed in front of his chest. In front of him, between palms, stands a two-storey pagoda. The northwestern lunette shows Africa. In front of a dark-skinned putto with crossed arms an elephant's head protrudes, behind him beneath a palm tree two pyramid-shaped huts can be seen. Opposite this depiction, in the southwestern lunette, is the fourth continent, America. A putto with feather skirt and feather crown carries a bow in his left hand, the right points to the Christ monogram. Behind him stand three tipis, in front of him behind a palm a buffalo head becomes visible.

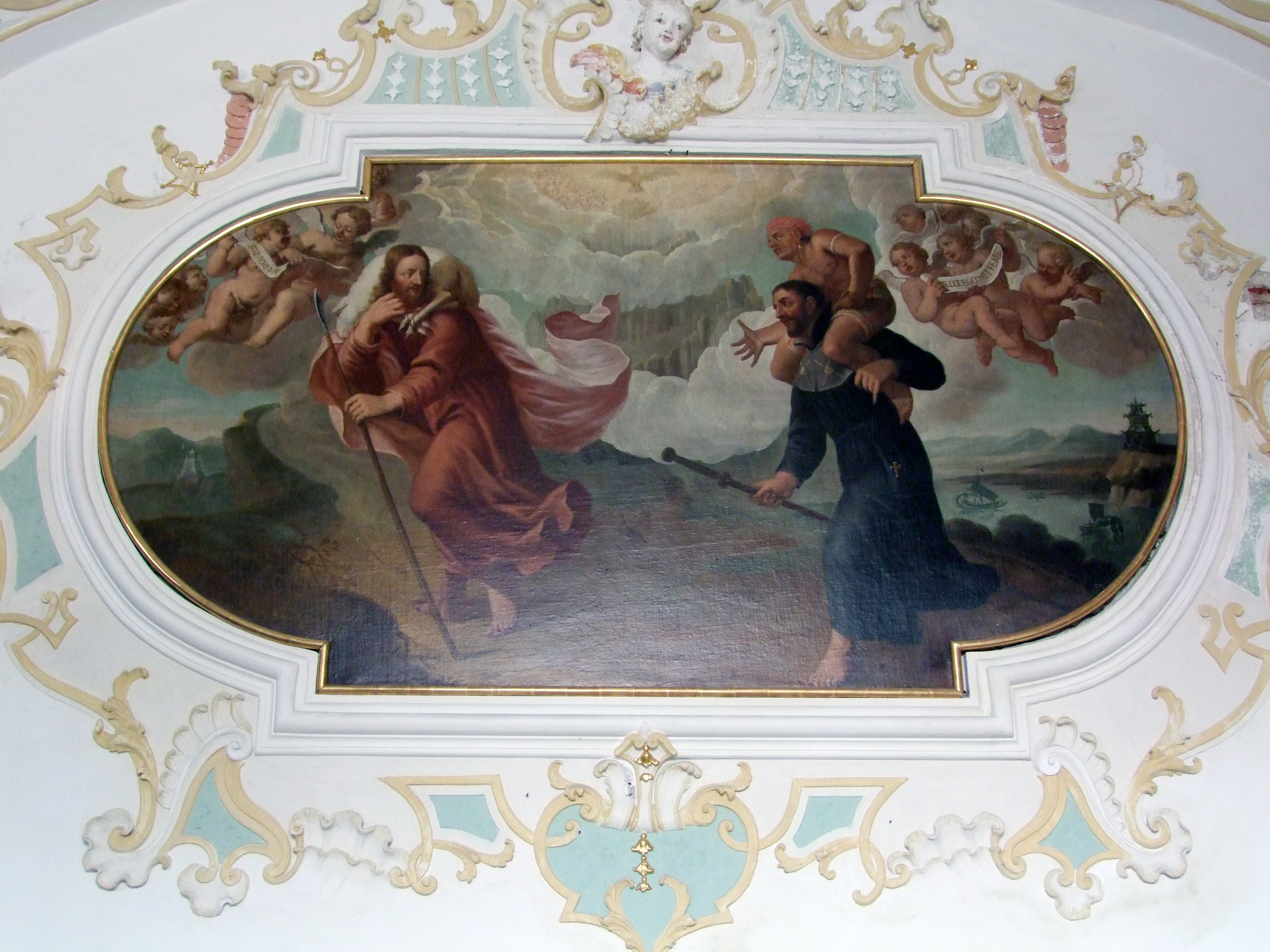
Christ and St. Francis Xavier, northern painting

Three oil paintings were donated by Duchess Mauritia Febronia. The central ceiling painting, by an unknown artist, was executed in 1691. It depicts St Francis Xavier baptising pagans. The saint, dressed in a choir robe and stole, holds a shell containing baptismal water over the kneeling converts. To his left kneels another cleric holding a baptismal bowl. The converts are shown with a variety of skin colours. The two wall paintings were probably created by the same artist in 1694. The painting on the west wall shows St Francis Xavier preaching. He stands as the central figure above the seated and kneeling pagans at his feet, wearing priestly vestments and holding a crucifix in his right hand. Here too the listeners are depicted with different skin tones.

The north-wall painting presents a rare subject: Christ and St Francis Xavier in a rectangular canvas with lateral projections. Christ, portrayed as the Good Shepherd, strides quickly forward across a rocky landscape and looks back toward St Francis Xavier, who follows carrying an Indian on his shoulders. At the upper corners, putti hold two banners reading SEQVERE ME ("Follow me") and ECCE EGO: MITTE ME ("Here am I; send me"). Between the figures, winding paths lead up a mountain; above hovers a dove in a radiant halo, symbolising the Holy Spirit.

The oak benches, made around 1743, have flat cheeks decorated with broad rocaille-notched banderole work and acanthus. A kneeler from the third quarter of the 18th century resembles the longer ones in the main church. The confessional against the west wall, with a volute pediment over the central axis, dates from the mid-18th century but was originally built c. 1726.

One of the few free-standing sculptures in the church is the polychromed Crescent Madonna, which stands on a pedestal against the north wall. Carved around 1670, it may be the work of Thomas Baumhauer or Martin Döttel of Mindelheim.

=== Ignatius Chapel ===
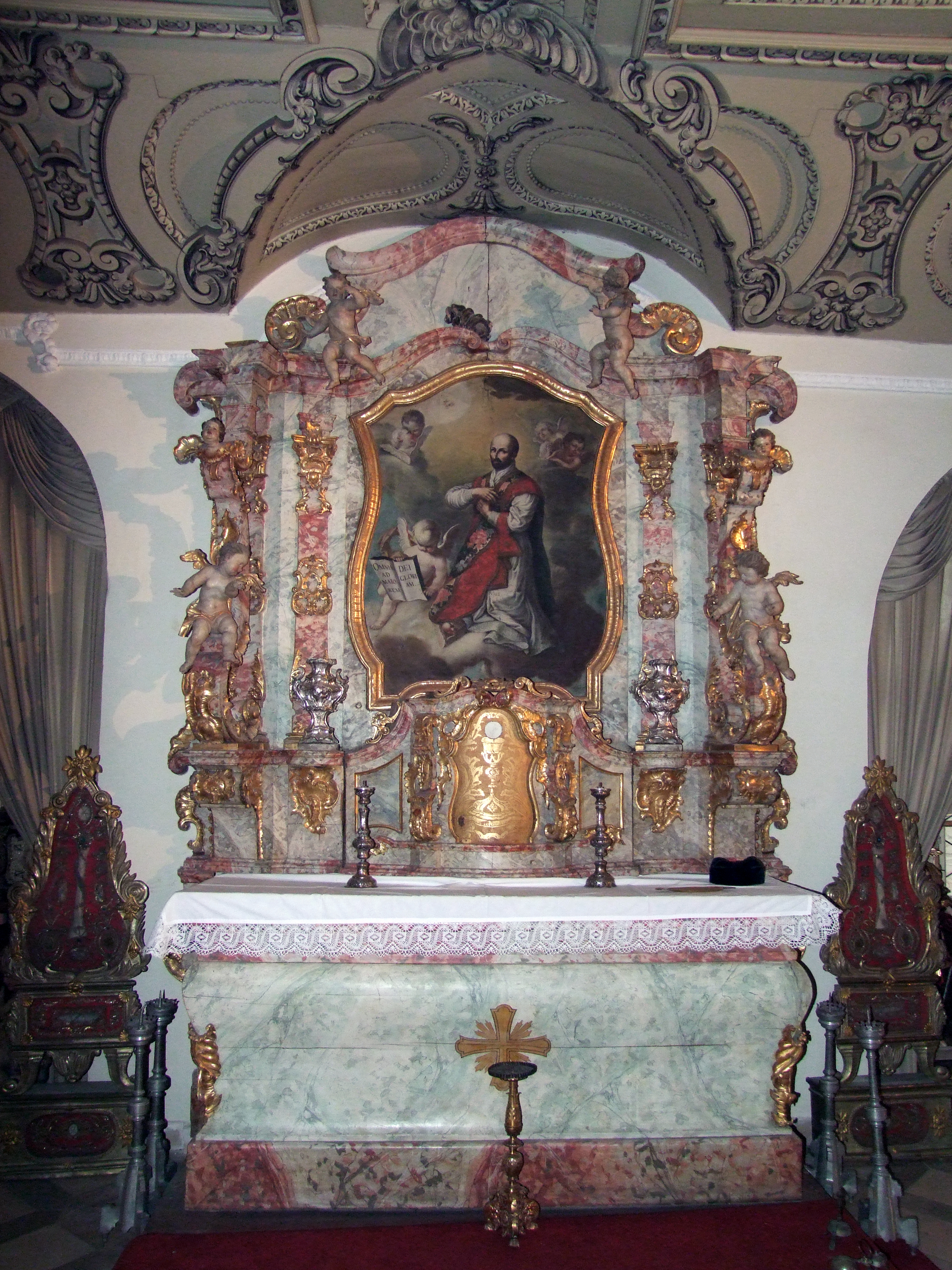
Altar of the Ignatius Chapel

The Ignatius Chapel, located on the first floor above the sacristy and accessible only from the former monastery wing, has two rectangular windows in pointed-arched niches on the east wall and a similar niche containing the entrance door on the west. The Ignatius altar covers the central one of the three south windows opening toward the choir.

The light-painted coffered wooden ceiling was installed c. 1629. It has a canted cove and is divided into two large crosses of square coffers with a central curved oval field containing an IHS monogram. The grisaille ceiling painting consists of leaf-staff frames, herm pilasters, angel heads and strapwork. The floor (date unknown) has a rose-point pattern.

The wooden altar of 1756 stands against the south wall. It is marbled pink and blue-grey with gilded rocaille decoration; the mensa is bulging. The convex tabernacle is framed by volutes; its curved door is engraved with chalice and host. The curved altarpiece shows St Ignatius in white Jesuit habit and flowered red chasuble, kneeling and gazing heavenward where the Eye of Providence appears. At his feet a white angel holds an open book inscribed OMNIA AD MAIOREM DEI GLORIAM. Two putti stand on the weakly curved cranked entablature. The extract is a low curved pediment; remnants of the original cloud and ray glory are now in the former library.

== Organ ==
=== 1722 organ ===
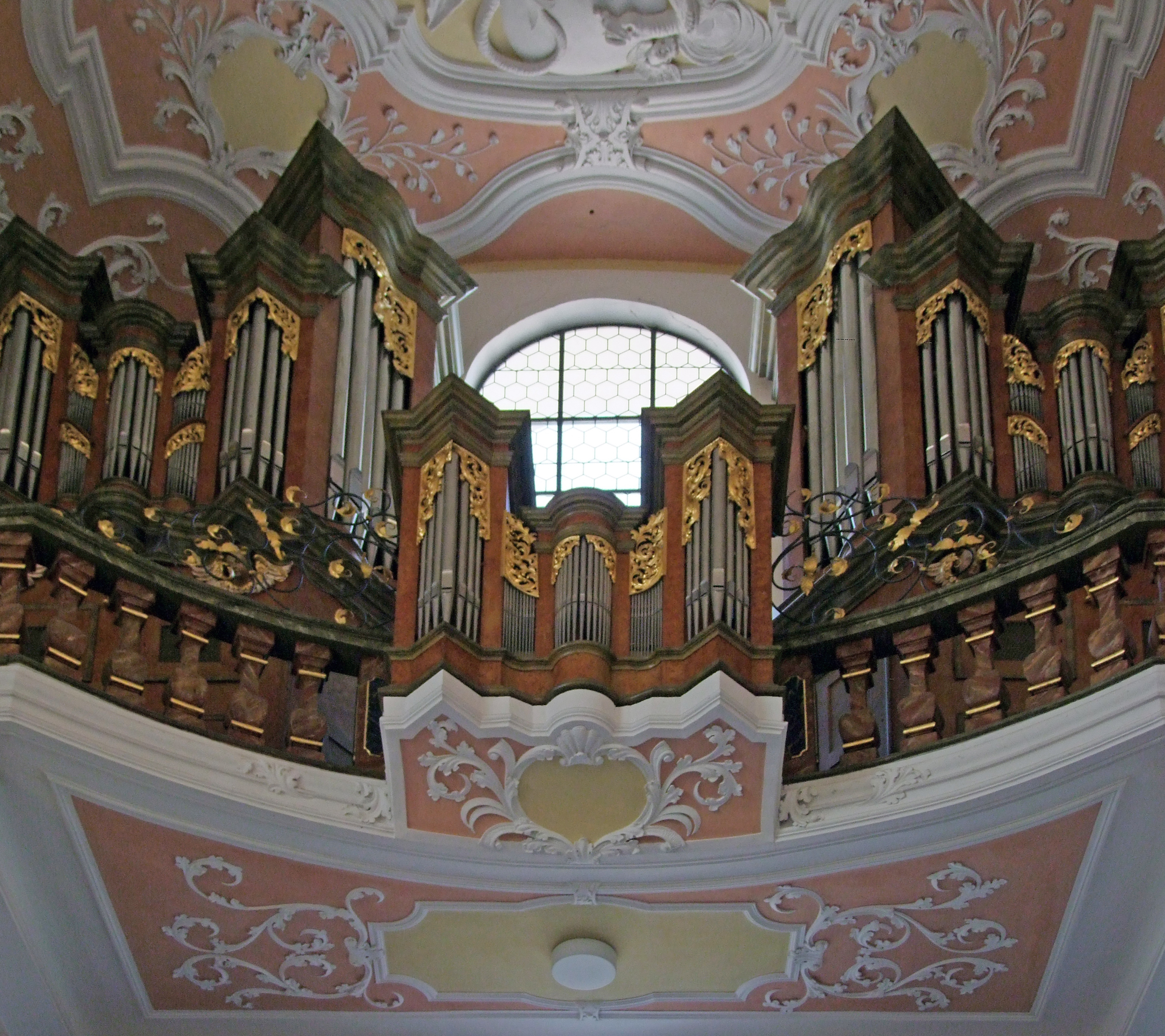
The present organ facade

Nothing more is known about the first organ, built in 1663 by Sebastian Achamer from Halle. Sources only exist for the new organ of 1722, which replaced the 1663 instrument. The richly polychromed case that still survives in the church received its first colouring in 1727. There are no archival references to the organ builder, but comparisons with organs in the surrounding area at Tussenhausen, Kirchhaslach and Steingaden suggest that it may have been Augustin Simnacher from Tussenhausen.

=== 1832 repair ===
In 1832 the organ was repaired and enlarged by Meinrad Dreher and his son Joseph Anton Dreher from Illereichen. They expanded the pedal division from two to four stops, built a new pedal windchest that was placed in front of the central window between the two main sections of the case, and thereby gave the pedal greater fullness. The lowest three pedal stops were placed on the new chest; only the Quintbaß remained on the old one. The pitch, which had still followed the lower "mediam-Ton" common in Central Swabia since the 18th century, was raised during this work. The total cost was 150 gulden for the organ work and 18.98 gulden to the joiner Ruppert Weißenhorn of Mindelheim for the new pedal chest. After the enlargement the instrument had 18 stops. The 1859 statistical description of Mindelheim by Trieb and Seybold described the organ as "very old" and in "ruinous condition".

=== 1896 rebuild ===
Due to the poor condition of the organ, it was decided in 1896 to purchase a completely new instrument. The firm G. F. Steinmeyer & Co. from Oettingen built a new organ with 24 stops as their opus 577 for a price of 11,475.30 gold marks. Only parts of the old organ case were retained; even the façade pipes were newly made. The organ was installed in the centre of the second (upper) west gallery. In total, four windchests, each measuring 190 × 64 centimetres, were installed. The windchests were placed one above the other in two tiers, divided into C and C-sharp sides. The historic organ cases were used for the stops of 8′ and higher; the smaller stops were placed at floor level. Apart from the ten largest, the façade pipes were not speaking and were fitted only for decoration. Behind the Hauptwerk at façade height, the stops of the second manual were placed on a windchest measuring 347 × 82 centimetres. This partially blocked the upper central church window. For this reason, the west window of the church had to be altered and a connection created between the historic main case and a new façade field. Two pedal windchests were placed behind the Hauptwerk and the Nebenwerk at floor level. These chests measured 225 × 72 centimetres and were divided into C and C-sharp sides (16′ height). The entire organ installation extended from the west wall of the church to the gallery balustrade.

The console was set up on the first (lower) gallery. It was connected to the organ on the second gallery by tubular-pneumatic action. This solution was chosen so that choir singers could also find space beside the organist; both would no longer have fitted on the second gallery. Since the organist could no longer hear the organ directly, this arrangement proved extremely unfavourable. The longer reaction time of the pneumatic action also had a negative effect on playability. For these reasons, the choir was hardly ever accompanied by the organ; demanding performances on the organ were scarcely possible any longer. During the church restoration of 1907, an attempt was made in part to restore the former visual appearance of the organ.

=== 1907 rebuild ===
In 1907 the Mindelheim organ builder Julius Schwarzbauer rebuilt the Steinmeyer organ. The Hauptwerk and Nebenwerk divisions were repositioned on the gallery behind cupboard-like wooden panelling to the left and right. The Pedalwerk was placed behind the main cases, and the Nebenwerk was converted into a swell division by enclosing it in a swell box. Schwarzbauer largely reversed Steinmeyer's alterations to the historic organ case. He pushed the cases back against the west wall of the church and placed the division windchests close to the gallery floor. This new arrangement, however, created further problems, as the windchests were not designed for such a placement. Access to the valves for maintenance became almost impossible. The console was moved to the centre of the gallery, thereby reducing its distance to the manual divisions to ten metres. Even this distance, however, caused considerable delay in the speech of the pipes. Even allowing for the standards of the period, the rebuilt instrument – whose stoplist remained unchanged – lacked the characteristics of a solidly built organ. The positive case, which had stood empty since 1896, remained unused in this rebuild as well. The Baroque façade elements served only as decoration.

=== 1987 organ ===
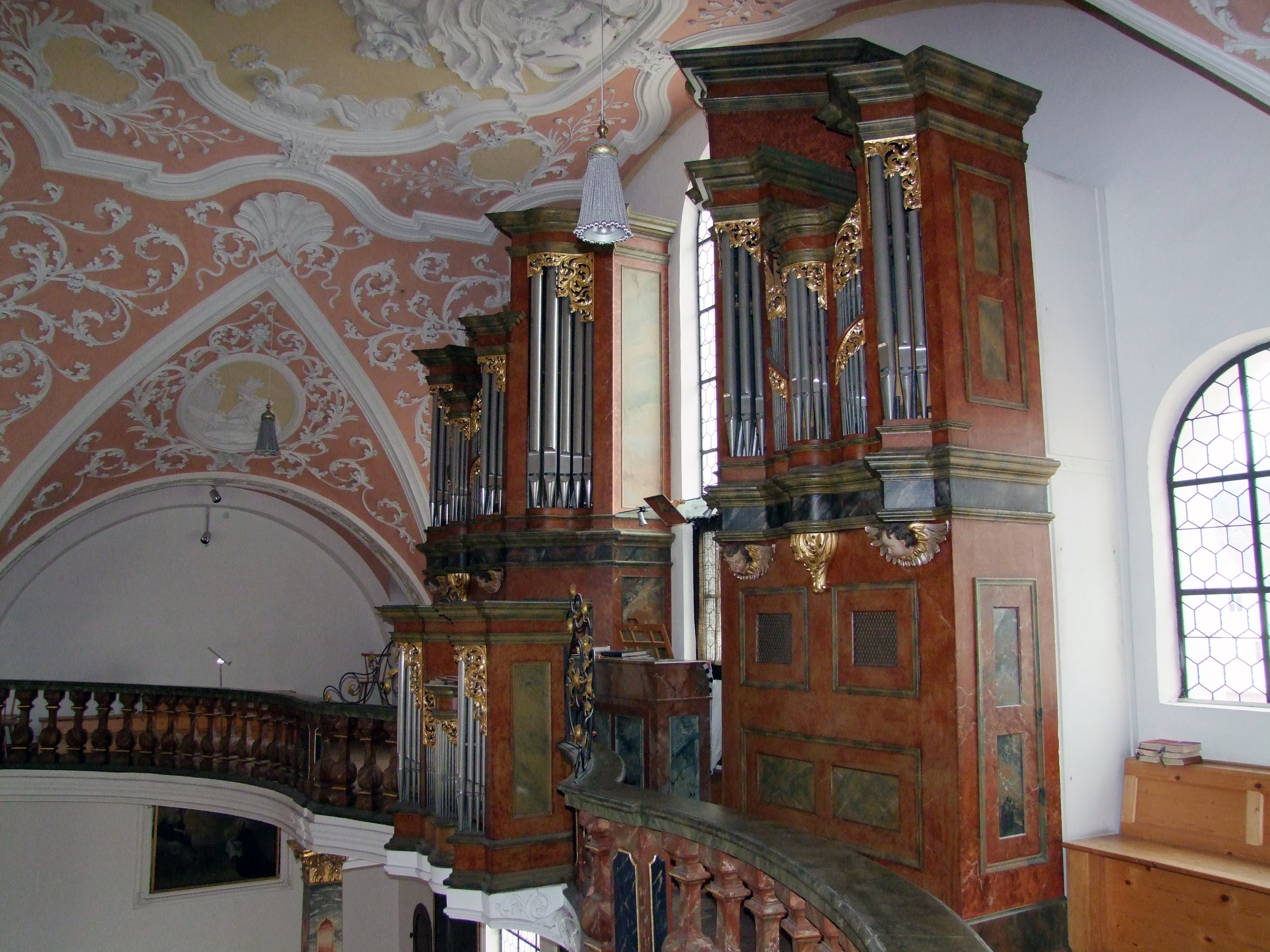
Side view of the present organ

Following the church restoration of 1976–1981, it was decided in 1987 to replace the organ entirely. In consultation with the Bavarian State Office for Monument Preservation in Munich, the diocesan organ consultant of Augsburg, and the Mindelheim parish, agreement was reached to commission a completely new instrument rather than repair or rebuild the old one. The contract was awarded to the Rudolf Kubak workshop of Augsburg.

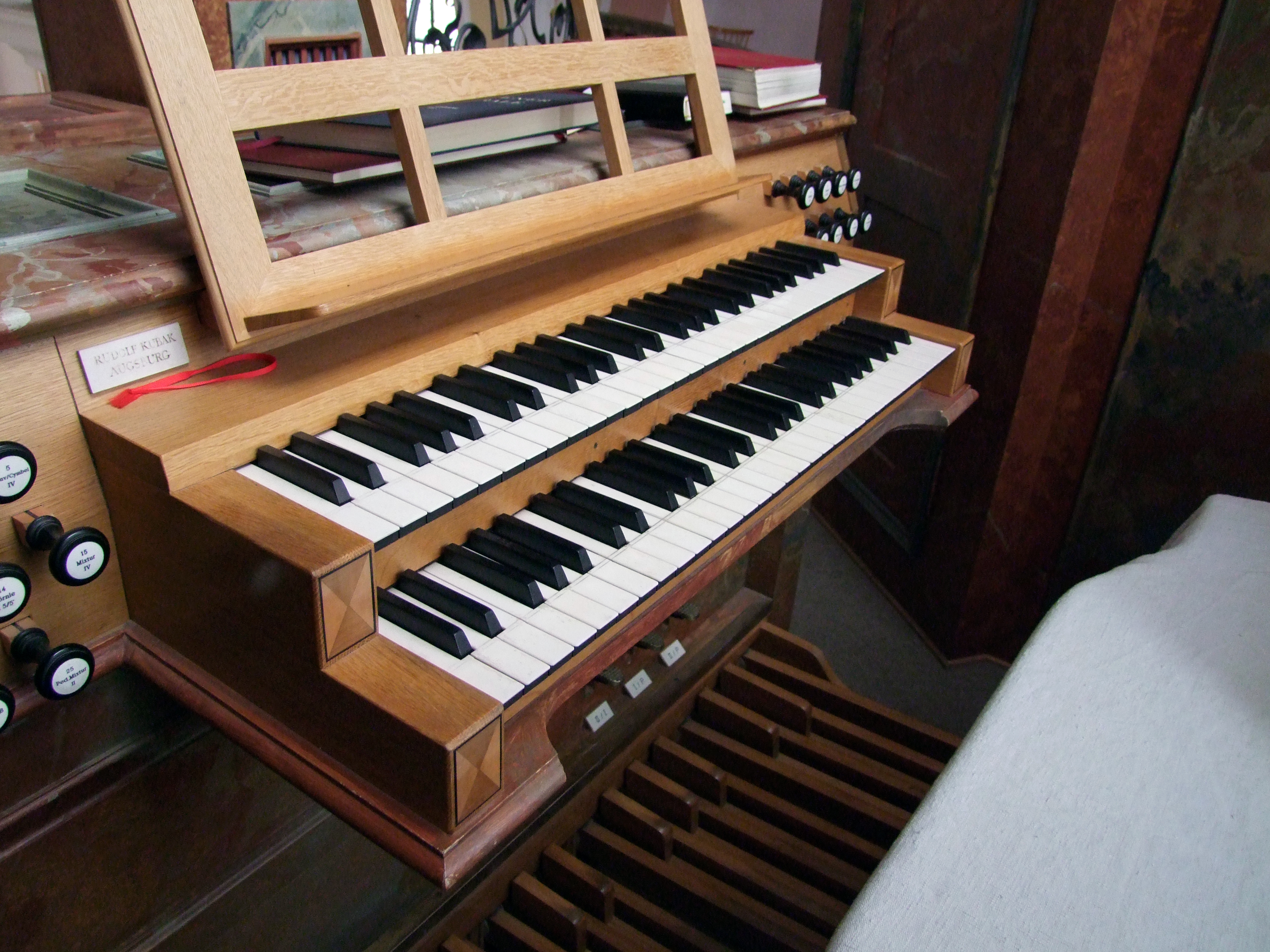
Playing console of the present organ

The historic organ cases had to be modified and integrated into the new instrument, respecting the building principles of earlier Swabian organ workshops and fulfilling the requirements of monument preservation, which mandated the retention of the historic cases, the façade pipes, and a portion of the 1896 Steinmeyer pipework. Into the two main cases were installed combined windchests (C- and C-sharp sides) for the Hauptwerk and Pedal. The second manual was conceived as a Brüstungspositiv (chest-positive). The windchests are slider chests and their division is visible through the façade. Following old Swabian tradition, the free-standing console was placed facing the high altar. Both playing and stop actions are purely mechanical.

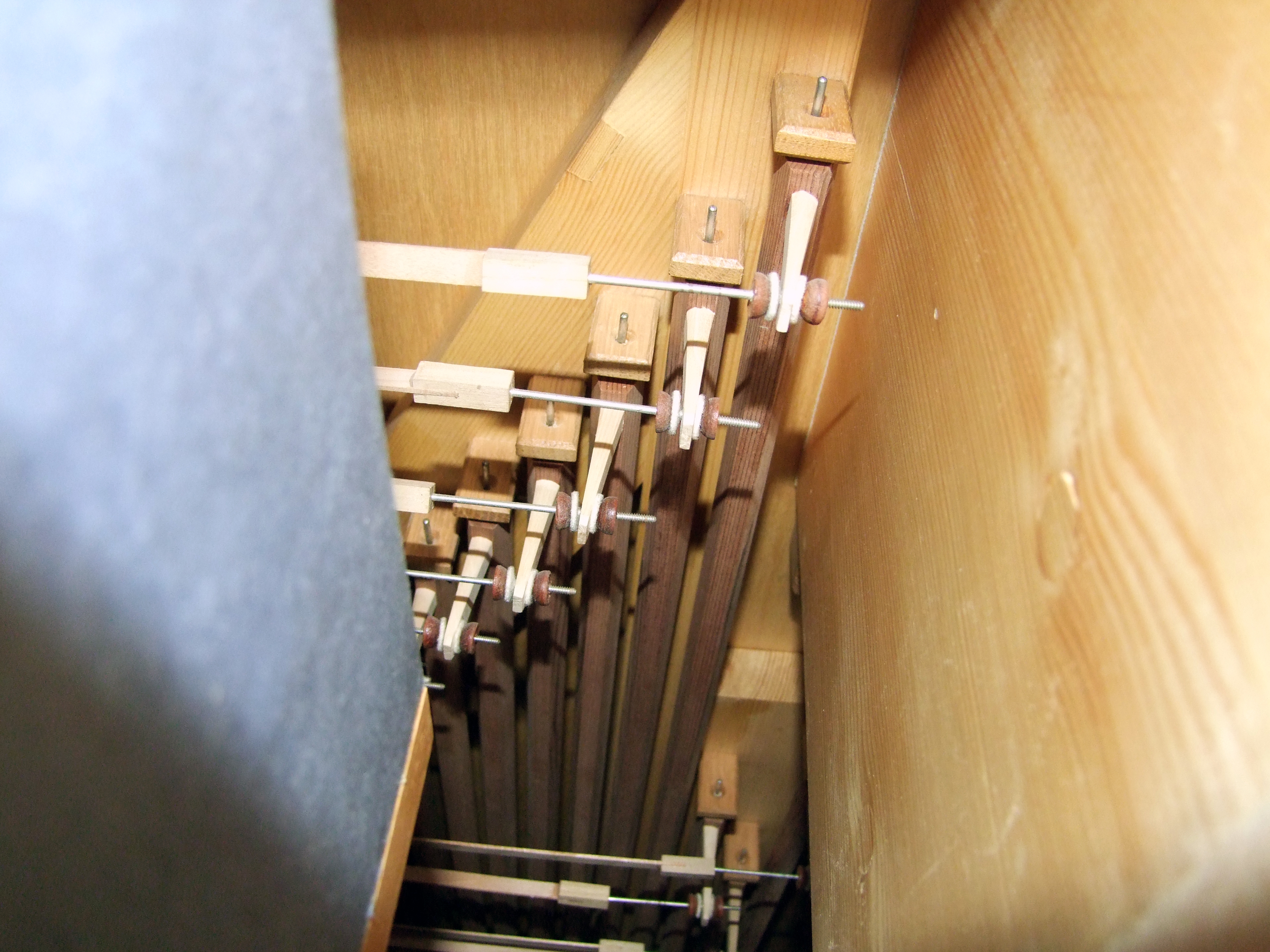
The interior of the present-day organ

The historic cases lacked their acoustically important back panels and roofs, which had presumably been removed during earlier rebuilds. The wooden structures were also heavily infested with woodworm. For wind supply, an electric blower was installed that forces compressed air through a wooden duct into the bellows. Three multiple-fold reservoirs provide stable wind for the individual divisions. The temperament is mildly meantone. In windchests, action, cases and pipes, woods and alloys were used in accordance with the practice of Swabian and Upper Swabian Baroque masters, while still meeting modern requirements.

The Hauptwerk, in keeping with South-German tradition, possesses a complete principal chorus. To enable the typical South-German "Hörnle" sound, a Tierce 1 3/5′ was added to the principal family, allowing coloration of all plenum stages. The tonal backbone of the organ is the Hauptwerk with its principal registers. For reasons of space it received no 16′ stop – a practice that had been successfully established by earlier Baroque builders in Upper Swabia (Holzhay, Freiwiß, Simnacher and others often dispensed with a 16′ in the manual as well).

The Positiv may be described as a small division compared with the Hauptwerk. It serves as an accompanying and continuo instrument and contains the characteristic Swabian flutes, colouring aliquots, the narrow-scaled Salicet and the reed stop Cromorne. Its tonal independence from the Hauptwerk is guaranteed by the 4′ Principal basis and the four-rank Mixture.

The Pedal Principal is tuned to the Hauptwerk, and space was optimally utilised by two mechanical transmissions, without sacrificing necessary tonal possibilities. Gravity is provided to the Pedal by the reed stops and cantus-firmus possibilities.

The instrument has 27 speaking stops plus two prepared stops (1,745 pipes) on two manuals and pedal. Wind pressure is 70 mm water column for Hauptwerk and Pedal, and 60 mm for the Positiv.

== Bells ==
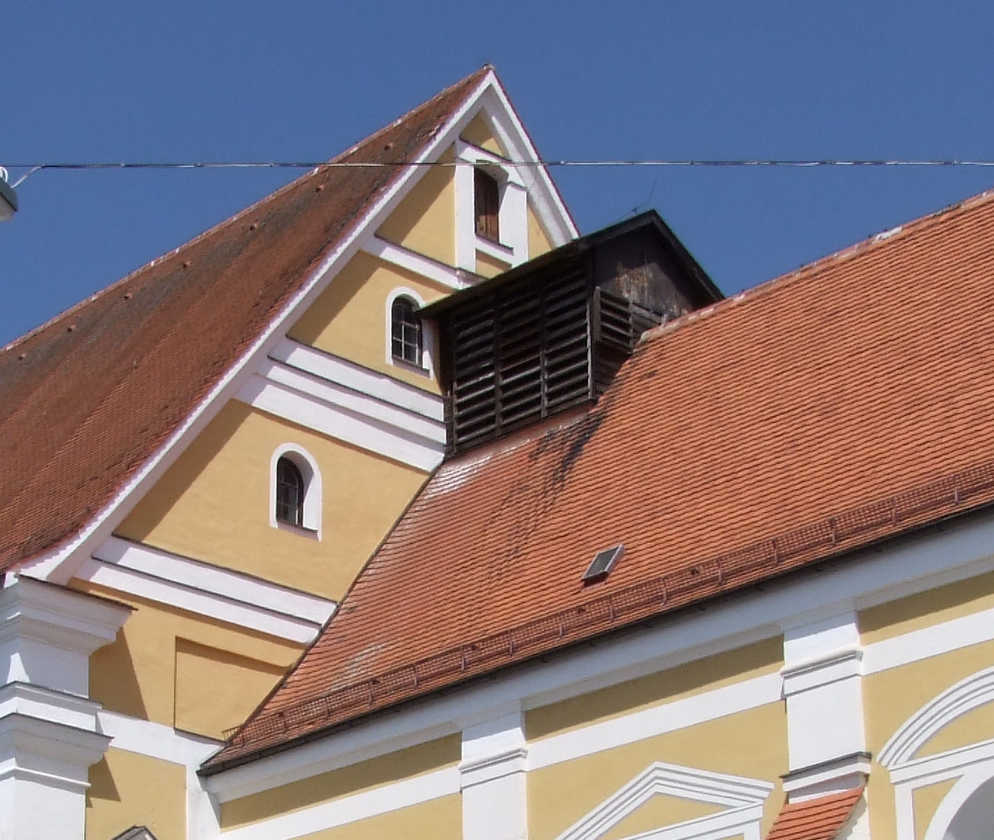
The ridge turret on the choir roof truss

Three bells hang in the ridge turret above the choir. The oldest is attributed to an unknown master from Nuremberg and dated to the first quarter of the 15th century. It has a diameter of 59 cm and a height of 49.5 cm. The inscription is partly difficult to read; the words are separated by anchor crosses and small bell symbols. It reads: er vnd gvt vilt dir Iaiden nev die sel von dem leib ... yt. The crown handle is fashioned as a braid on the front; the original crown itself was destroyed. The attribution is based on identical lettering found on a 1422 bell in Heidenheim near Gunzenhausen. The Mindelheim bell thus forms the final link in a group of Nuremberg bells that had existed since 1398.

The second bell is attributed to Gregor Löffler and Sons of Innsbruck. Cast in 1555, it measures 75.5 cm in diameter and 62 cm in height. The shoulder inscription is placed between corded borders. A recumbent vine leaf precedes the Roman numerals MCCCCCXXXXXV, flanked by a Crucifixion relief and an image of the Virgin. The strike ring has three ridges; the crown handle has a rectangular cross-section with chamfered edges – the upper arm horizontal, the lower drawn inward. The bell is identified as an Innsbruck Löffler casting by comparison of lettering and reliefs with the 1560 bell in the Margarethen district of Sonthofen.

The third and smallest bell is signed Hanns Georg Riederer, Mindelheim, 1688. With a diameter of 55 cm and height of 48 cm, it bears a shoulder inscription between two double ridges: AVS DEM FEIR FLOS ICH HANNS GEORG RIEDERER IN MINDLHAIM GOS MICH 1688 ("Out of the fire I flowed; Hanns Georg Riederer in Mindelheim cast me 1688"). Below is a frieze of hanging vegetal ornament. The flank is decorated with a figure of the Virgin Mary; the crown handle bears a lion's head on the front side.

== Bibliography ==
- Alois Epple: Kirchenkrippen im Oberallgäu. In: Bayerische Blätter für Volkskunde. Mitteilungen und Materialien. Jg. 10, 1983, ISSN 0720-8006, pp. 218–226.
- Lenz Kriss-Rettenbeck: Die Krippe in Forschung und Wissenschaft. In: Bayerische Blätter für Volkskunde. Mitteilungen und Materialien. Jg. 5, 1978, pp. 47–54.
- Heinrich Habel: Landkreis Mindelheim. (Kurzinventar) (= Bayerische Kunstdenkmale. Band 31). Deutscher Kunstverlag, 1971, ISSN 0522-5264, pp. 247–266.
- Erich Lidel: Die schwäbische Krippe (= Beiträge zur Landeskunde von Schwaben. Band 5). Anton H. Konrad, 1978, ISBN 3-87437-148-4, ISSN 0175-5463.
- Richard Paletta: Die Orgel der Jesuitenkirche Mindelheim. Catholic Parish Office of St. Stephan Mindelheim, Mindelheim 1987, OCLC 318612319.
- Sabine Poeschel: Studien zur Ikonographie der Erdteile in der Kunst des 16.–18. Jahrhunderts (= Beiträge zur Kunstwissenschaft. Band 3). Scaneg, Munich 1985, ISBN 3-9800671-3-0, pp. 99–107, 146–201 (also: Münster, University, dissertation, 1984).
- Sybe Wartena: Die Süddeutschen Chorgestühle von der Renaissance bis zum Klassizismus. dissertation, Ludwig-Maximilians-Universität München, Munich 2008, pp. 168–182, PDF; 5.9 MB.
- Friedrich Zoepfl, Erwin Holzbaur: Die Kirchen von Mindelheim (= Kleine Kunstführer. Band 511). 4th revised edition. Schnell & Steiner, 1995, ZDB-ID 51387-8, pp. 12–18.
