= An allem ist Hütchen schuld! =

1917 German opera by Siegfried Wagner

- Opera by Siegfried Wagner
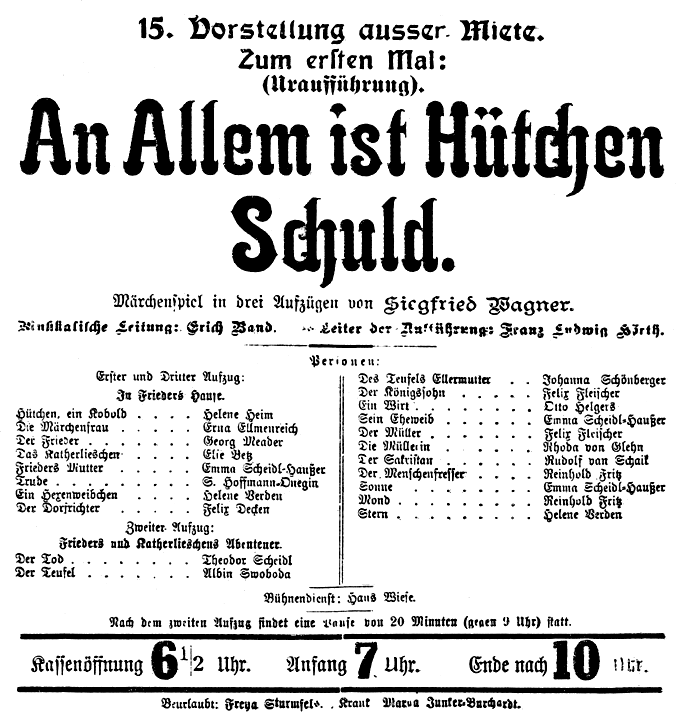
- Playbill for the premiere
- Description: Märchenspiel
- Translation: Hattie is to blame for everything!
- Librettist: Siegfried Wagner
- Language: German
- Based on: Fairy-tales by the Brothers Grimm
- Premiere: 5 November 1917; Hoftheater Stuttgart

An allem ist Hütchen schuld! ('Hattie is to blame for everything!'), Op. 11, is an opera in German in three acts composed by Siegfried Wagner in 1914/15 to his own libretto. It is described as a Märchenspiel or fairy-tale play. It premiered on 6 December 1917 at the Ccourt Theatre Stuttgart.

== History ==
Siegfried Wagner, the son of Richard Wagner, composed several operas on fairy tale and legendary topics. He began the composition of An allem ist Hütchen schuld! in September 1914. He finished a draft for the first act on 22 September and its score in November that year, a draft for the second act on 10 January 1915 and its score on 12 April, and the draft for the third act on 11 June, completing the opera on 26 August 1915. He wrote the libretto based on several episodes from fairy-tales by the Brothers Grimm.

The premiere was at the Hoftheater Stuttgart on 6 December 1917, staged by Franz Ludwig Hörth and conducted by Erich Band. It was a success with the public comparable to his Der Bärenhäuter. The opera was performed again in Halle in 1929, staged by Heinrich Kreutz and conducted again by Band. A production in Leipzig in 1939 was directed by Wolfram Humperdinck in a stage set by Wieland Wagner and conducted by Gilbert of Gravina. A production in Altenburg in 1944 was also shown in Bayreuth, directed by Wieland Wagner, conducted by Kurt Overhoff and with choreography by Gertrud Wagner.

After World War II, the opera was not played. The first complete production was in 1997 at the Theater Hagen, staged by Peter P. Pachl and conducted by Gerhard Markson. The opera was played once at the AudiMax of the Ruhr University Bochum on 18 October 2015, again staged by Pachl, with Lionel Friend conducting the Bochumer Symphoniker.

== Roles ==
Roles, voice types, premiere cast
Role	Voice type	Premiere cast, 6 December 1917 Conductor: Erich Band
Hütchen, a kobold	soprano	Helene Heim
Märchenfrau	soprano	Erna Ellmenreich
Katherlieschen	soprano	Else Betz
Frieder	tenor	George Maeder
Frieder's Mutter / Wirtsfrau / Sonne	mezzo-soprano	Emma Scheidl-Haußer
Trude	contralto	Sigrid Onégin
Hexenweibchen / Stern	coloratura soprano	Helene Berden
Dorfrichter	tenor	Felix Decken
Tod	baritone	Theodor Scheidl
Teufel	bass	Albin Swoboda
Des Teufels Ellermutter	mezzo-soprano	Johanna Schönberger
Königssohn	baritone	Felix Fleischer
Müller	bass	Felix Fleischer
Wirt	baritone	Otto Helgers
Müllerin	soprano	Roda von Glehn
Sakristan	tenor	Rudolf van Schaik
Menschenfresser / Mond	bass	Reinhold Fritz
Das singende, springende Löweneckerchen	soprano	
Jacob Grimm, Siegfried Wagner	speaking roles	

== Fairy tales ==
Wagner used elements from many fairy tales in his libretto, including:

- Frederick and Catherine (Der Frieder und das Katherlieschen)
- The Three Little Men in the Wood (Die drei Männlein im Walde)
- The Singing, Springing Lark (Das singende springende Löweneckerchen)
- The Clever Little Tailor (Vom klugen Schneiderlein)
- The Devil with the Three Golden Hairs (Der Teufel mit den drei goldenen Haaren)
- The Devil and his Grandmother (Der Teufel und seine Großmutter)
- The Seven Ravens (Die sieben Raben)
- Death's Messengers (Die Boten des Todes)
- Godfather Death (Der Gevatter Tod)
- The Wishing-Table, the Gold-Ass, and the Cudgel in the Sack (Tischchen deck dich, Goldesel und Knüppel aus dem Sack)
- The Little Peasant (Das Bürle)
- Allerleirauh
- The Two Kings' Children (De beiden Künigeskinner)
- The Iron Stove (Der Eisenofen)
- The True Bride (Die wahre Braut)
- Rapunzel
- The Two Brothers (Die zwei Brüder)
- Little Claus and Big Claus (Der kleine Klaus und der große Klaus) by Hans Christian Andersen

== Recordings ==
- An Allem ist Hütchen Schuld! Niklas Mix, Hans-Georg Priese, Rebecca Broberg, Alessandra di Giorgio, Maarja Purga, Karlovy Vary Symphony Orchestra, David Robert Coleman Marco Polo/Naxos 3CD 2022
- An Allem ist Hütchen Schuld!, DVD Alexander Lueg, Hans-Georg Priese, Rebecca Broberg, Julia Ostertag, Bochum Symphony Orchestra, Lionel Friend, Marco Polos/Naxos DVD 2019
