= List of operas by Paul Hindemith =

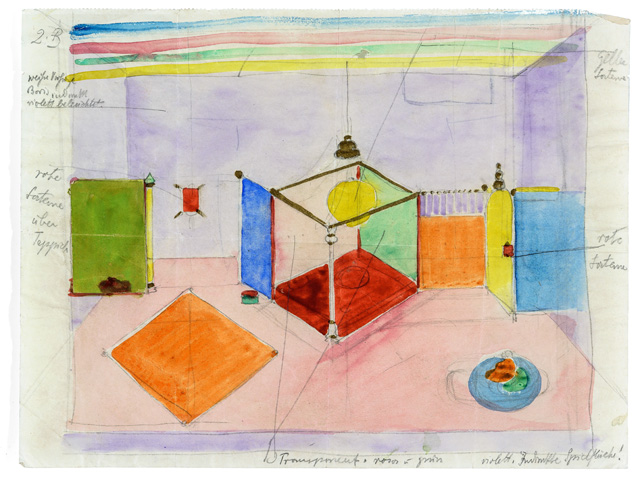
Oskar Schlemmer's stage design for Das Nusch-Nuschi

This is a list of operas by Paul Hindemith (1895–1963).

== List ==
Title	Genre	Subdivisions	Libretto	Première date	Place, theatre
Mörder, Hoffnung der Frauen	opera	1 act	Oskar Kokoschka	4 June 1921	Stuttgart, Staatstheater
Das Nusch-Nuschi	opera	1 act	Franz Blei	4 June 1921	Stuttgart, Staatstheater
Sancta Susanna	opera	1 act	August Stramm	26 March 1922	Frankfurt, Alte Oper
Cardillac	opera	3 acts	Ferdinand Lion after E. T. A. Hoffmann's Das Fräulein von Scuderi (revised by Hindemith, 1952)	9 November 1926; revised version: 20 June 1952	Dresden, Semperoper; revised version: Zürich, Stadttheater
Hin und zurück	Sketch mit Musik	1 scene	Marcellus Schiffer	15 July 1927	Baden-Baden, Theater der Stadt
Neues vom Tage	lustige Oper	3 parts	Marcellus Schiffer (revised by Hindemith, 1954, and translated by Rinaldo Küfferle as Novità del giorno)	8 June 1929; revised version: 7 April 1954	Berlin, Kroll Opera House; revised version: Naples, Teatro di San Carlo
Lehrstück	music theatre work	7 scenes	Bertolt Brecht	28 July 1929	Baden-Baden, Stadthalle
Wir bauen eine Stadt	Spiel für Kinder		Robert Seitz	21 June 1930	Berlin
Mathis der Maler	opera	7 scenes	composer	28 May 1938	Zürich
Die Harmonie der Welt	opera	5 acts	composer	11 August 1957	Munich, Prinzregententheater
The Long Christmas Dinner	opera	1 act	Thornton Wilder	17 December 1961	Mannheim, Mannheim National Theatre
