= Paul Haase =

German baritone

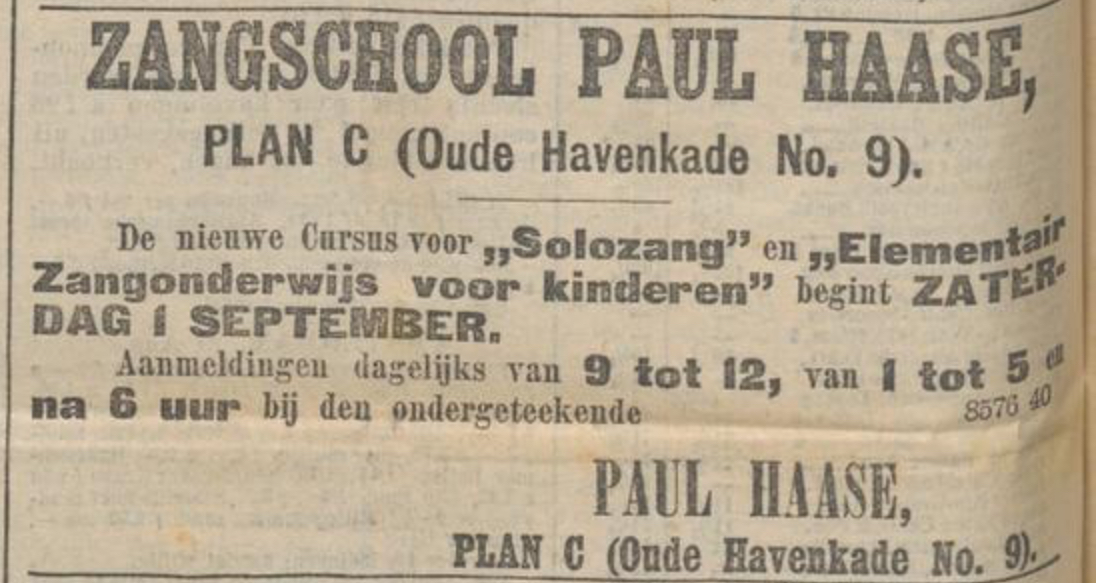
- Newspaper advert for Paul Haase's singing school dated 29 August 1894

Background information
- Born: Hermann Paul Max Haase; 8 January 1857; Potsdam
- Died: 1 January 1906 (aged 48) Cologne
- Genres: Opera

Hermann Paul Max Haase (Potsdam, 8 January 1857 – Cologne, 1 January 1906) was a German baritone who partially lived and worked in the Netherlands.

== Singing career ==
Haase sang regularly from 1882 in the Netherlands, amongst others at the Hoogduitse Opera in Rotterdam. Between 1890 and 1894 he was a soloist four times in a performance of the Concertgebouworkest. He wrote the libretto for the opera Der falsche Czar by Jan Rijken, in which he would play the main part, but he became ill.

== Teaching career ==
At the Hoogduitse Opera he also became a singing tutor, both privately and at the Rotterdams Conservatorium. From 1895 till 1898 he taught at the Hochschule für Musik Karlsruhe, but also for a while in Cincinnati, and from 1898 till 1907 at the Hochschule für Musik und Tanz Köln. Some of his best-known students were the concert singers Hedy Iracema-Brügelmann (1879–1941) and Pauline de Haan-Manifarges (1872–1954).

== Death ==
His death in 1906 as a result of a stroke was national news. He died soon after his wife, the singer Sophie Bosse.
