= Reinhold Fritz =

German opera singer

- Born: 16 March 1884; Ostfildern, German Empire
- Died: 30 October 1950 (aged 66); Stuttgart, West Germany
- Occupation: Operatic bass-baritone
- Organizations: Stuttgart Court Opera
- Title: Kammersänger

Reinhold Fritz (16 March 1884 – 30 October 1950) was a German operatic bass-baritone. He was engaged at the Stuttgart Court Opera for 25 years and was awarded the title Kammersänger. He performed a broad repertoire of both serious and comic roles, and participated in world premieres including the first version of Ariadne auf Naxos by Richard Strauss, Siegfried Wagner's An allem ist Hütchen schuld! and Hindemith's Das Nusch-Nuschi. Fritz was dismissed in 1933 under the Nazi regime because his wife was Jewish.

== Life and career ==
Born in Ostfildern, Fritz learned the profession of a goldsmith and practised it for six years in Esslingen am Neckar. In 1904 he began studying voice in Stuttgart, and was engaged as an apprentice (Eleve) at the Stuttgart Court Opera in 1908. After only one year he was accepted as a member of the ensemble. He built a broad repertoire of both serious and comic roles, and quickly became one of the pillars of the ensemble. His voice range also included Heldenbaritone roles. In 1913, he was awarded the title of a royal Kammersänger. He received offers from other opera houses, but remained loyal to the Stuttgart opera. He also took part in numerous premieres and first performances, in works by Walter Braunfels, Paul Hindemith, Ture Rangström, Max von Schillings and Siegfried Wagner. He only left Stuttgart for guest performances, which took him to the Bayerische Hofoper in Munich and the Großherzogliches Hoftheater in Karlsruhe, among others.

Fritz married Hilda Landauer from Ravensburg in 1912. The couple had at least one son, Walter Fritz (born in 1915), who later also pursued a career as an opera singer. Since the singer refused to divorce his Jewish wife after the National Socialists seized power, he was "retired for health reasons", as it was officially stated, on 1 August 1933 at the age of 49. However, unlike his Jewish colleagues Hermann Horner and Hermann Wilhelm Weil, who were also dismissed, he was given the right to a farewell performance. On 6 December 1933, he appeared as van Bett in Lortzing's Zar und Zimmermann, one of his signature roles, and was named an honorary member of the house that evening. On the playbill, however, he was already noted as a guest. Verstummte Stimmen notes that individual guest performances at the Stuttgart opera until 1935 did not change the fact that his singing career was suddenly ended at its peak.

This was followed by exclusion from the Reichstheaterkammer, which was tantamount to a practical Berufsverbot (professional ban). Since the family could not survive with the meagre pension, Fritz had to work from then on as an assistant for a Stuttgart coal merchant and in a Bielefeld company. To make matters worse, the family's home was destroyed by aerial bombs. In the 1945/46 season Fritz was brought back to the Stuttgart opera, but only with a guest performance contract for ten evenings.

Fritz spent the last years of his life in Eningen unter Achalm. He died in Stuttgart at the age of 66.

== Roles ==
The list of roles is based on Großes Sängerlexikon and Verstummte Stimmen:

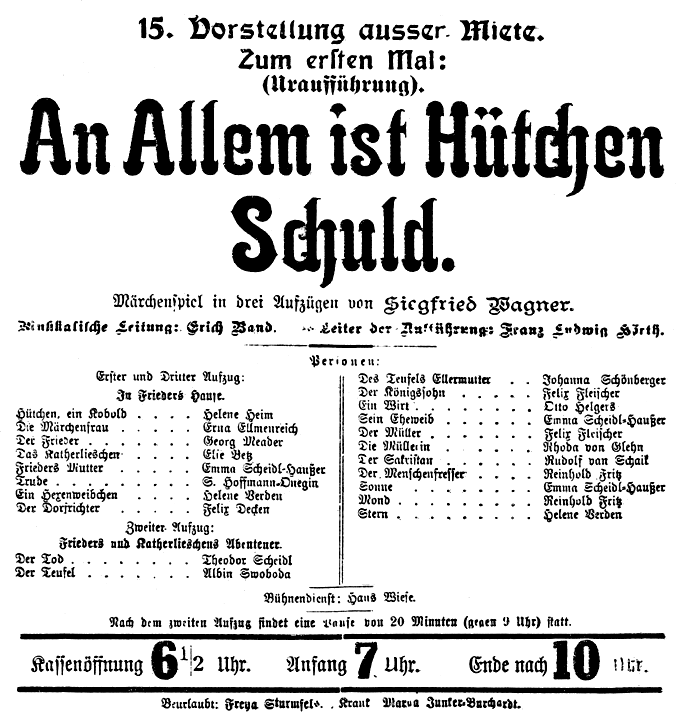
Playbill for the first performance of S. Wagner's An allem ist Hütchen schuld in Stuttgart in 1917

World premieres in Stuttgart:

- Prinzessin Brambilla by Walter Braunfels, 25 March 1909, conductor: Max von Schillings
- Ariadne auf Naxos by Richard Strauss, original version, 25 October 1912 - as Truffaldino
- Ulenspiegel by Walter Braunfels, 4 November 1913
- Ferdinand und Luise by Julius Zaiczek-Blankenau, based on Schiller's Kabale und Liebe, 16 January 1914 - as Miller
- Mona Lisa by Beatrice von Dovsky and Max von Schillings, 26 September 1915 - as Pietro Tumoni
- An allem ist Hütchen schuld! by Siegfried Wagner, 6 December 1917 - as Menschenfresser / Mond
- Die Kronenbraut by August Strindberg and Ture Rangström, 1919, conductor: Max von Schillings
- Das Nusch-Nuschi by Paul Hindemith, 4 June 1921, conductor: Fritz Busch, director: Otto Erhardt, stage: Oskar Schlemmer - as Kyce Waing

Beethoven:

- Rocco in Fidelio

Jacques Fromental Halévy:

- Kardinal in La Juive

Albert Lortzing:

- Bürgermeister van Bett in Zar und Zimmermann
- Hans Stadinger im Der Waffenschmied

Mozart:

- Osmin in die Entführung aus dem Serail
- Speaker in Die Zauberflöte

Verdi:

- Pietro in Simon Boccanegra
- Ramfis in Aida

Wagner:

- Steffano Colonna in Rienzi
- Daland in The Flying Dutchman
- Marke in Tristan und Isolde
- Veit Pogner in Die Meistersinger von Nürnberg
- Fafner in Das Rheingold and Siegfried
- Hunding in Die Walküre
- Wanderer in Siegfried
- Hagen in Götterdämmerung
- Gurnemanz in Parsifal

Carl Maria von Weber:

- Eremit and Kaspar in Der Freischütz

== Memorial ==
Fritz was one of the leading singers of the Stuttgart opera. He was also successful in guest appearances and impressed with his versatility. His work in Stuttgart was shown in the exhibition Verstummte Stimmen (Silenced voices), about the expulsion of Jewish performers from 1933 to 1945, which was also shown at the Stuttgart State Opera in autumn 2008. On 7 April 2016, another memorial session for the victims of the Nazi regime was held among the members of the Stuttgart State Theatres. In this context, a wall plaque "Verstummte Stimmen" for 23 artists, including Reinhold Fritz, was unveiled in the foyer of the Staatstheater.
