= Prinzessin Brambilla =

1909 opera by Walter Braunfels

- Opera by Walter Braunfels
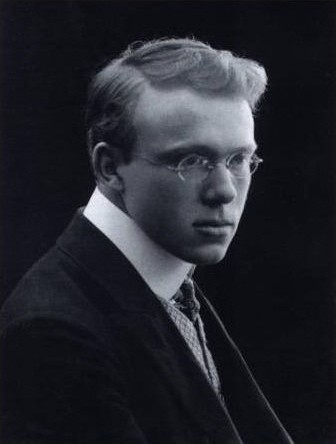
- Walter Braunfels in 1902
- Librettist: Braunfels
- Language: German
- Based on: E. T. A. Hoffmann's novella
- Premiere: 25 March 1909; Stuttgart Court Theatre

Prinzessin Brambilla (Princess Brambilla), Op. 12b, is an opera in a prologue and five scenes by Walter Braunfels. The German libretto, written by the composer, is based on the novella of the same name by E. T. A. Hoffmann published in 1820.

== History ==
Braunfels began the composition in 1906 and completed the original two-act version in 1908. He revised the opera in 1929/1930. The second version consists of a prologue and five scenes separated by orchestral interludes. The score of this revised version is published by Universal Edition.

The opera was first performed in its original two-act version on 25 March 1909 at the Stuttgart Court Theatre with Max von Schillings conducting.

== Roles ==
Roles, voice types, premiere cast
Role	Voice type	Premiere cast, 25 March 1909 Conductor: Max von Schillings
Pantalone	baritone	Hermann Wilhelm Weil
Prince Bastaniello di Pistoja	baritone	Reinhold Fritz
Claudio, an actor	tenor	Alfred Goltz
Giazinta, a young seamstress	soprano	Anna Sutter
Barbara, Giazinta's old friend	contralto	Johanna Schönberger
Gascon, a nobleman, Claudio's friend	tenor	
Brutz, Claudio's drinking companion	bass	
Buffel, Claudio's drinking companion	tenor	
Cuniberto, the landlord	bass	
A young girl	soprano	

== Recordings ==
In 2005 Marco Polo released a live recording, made during the October 2004 Wexford Festival Opera production run, with Daniele Belardinelli conducting the Cracow Philharmonic Orchestra. The cast included Enrico Marabelli as Pantalone, Peter Paul as Prince Bastaniello, Eric Shaw as Claudio, Elena Lo Forte as Giazinta, and a young Ekaterina Gubanova in the minor role of Barbara.
