= Mona Lisa (opera) =

Mona Lisa, Op. 31, is a 1915 opera by the German composer Max von Schillings on a libretto by Beatrice von Dovsky. It was dedicated to the Philosophy Faculty of the University of Heidelberg, where the composer was awarded the title of professor.

== Composition history ==
In the spring of 1913, Beatrice von Dovsky presented the libretto to the composer, who prepared a piano sketch during the following summer. He completed the opera during his eight-month military duty as a medical soldier in France and Belgium. The subject was very topical at the time, because the painting by Leonardo da Vinci had been stolen from the Louvre in 1911, and rediscovered in Florence in 1913.

== Performance history ==
The opera was first performed on 26 September 1915 in the Hofoper in Stuttgart, with the composer conducting. In the same year it was also performed in Vienna (with Maria Jeritza in the title role), Berlin (Richard Strauss conducting the first two performances), Breslau, Hamburg and Budapest.

The North American premiere took place at the Metropolitan Opera in New York on 1 March 1923, Artur Bodanzky conducting, with Barbara Kemp, Michael Bohnen (both making their Met debut) and Curt Taucher in the principal roles.

Post war revivals at the Städtische Oper Berlin in 1953 and at the Badischen Staatstheater in Karlsruhe in 1983 were cut in length. It was revived complete at the Kiel Opera House in November 1994 and subsequently performed at the Wiener Volksoper in 1996.

== Roles ==
Leonardo da Vinci's painting Mona Lisa, an inspiration source of the opera

Roles, voice types, premiere cast
Role	Voice type	Premiere cast, 26 September 1915 (Conductor: Max von Schillings)
In prologue and epilogue
Ein Fremder (A Foreigner)	baritone	John Forsell
Seine junge Frau (His young wife)	soprano	Hedy Iracema-Brügelmann
Ein Laienbruder (A Lay Brother)	tenor	Karl Aagard Østvig
In acts 1 and 2
Francesco del Giocondo	baritone	John Forsell
Mona Fiordalisa, his young wife	soprano	Hedy Iracema-Brügelmann
Giovanni de Salviati	tenor	Karl Aagard Østvig
Pietro Tumoni	bass	Reinhold Fritz
Arrigo Oldofredi	tenor	George Maeder
Alessio Beneventi	tenor	Felix Decken
Sandro da Luzzano	baritone	Benno Ziegler
Masolini Pedruzzi	bass	Albin Swoboda Jr.
Dianora, Francesco's little daughter from his first marriage	soprano	
Mona Ginevra ad Alta Rocca	soprano	
Piccarda, Mona Lisa's maid	alto	
Sisto, Francesco's servant	tenor	Felix Decken

== Synopsis ==
Place: the house of Francesco del Giocondo in Florence
Time: present (prologue and epilogue), 1492 (Acts 1 and 2)

=== Prologue ===
A couple is visiting a palace in Florence. A lay brother tells them the history of the house and its occupants, among them Fiordalisa Gherardini, Francesco Giocondo's wife painted by Leonardo da Vinci.

=== Act 1 ===
Together with his guests, Francesco is celebrating the last night of the Carnival, while his wife, the beautiful Mona Lisa, has gone out for confession. A procession led by the courtesan Ginevra passes, but the preacher Savonarola together with a chorus of monks interrupts the Carnival activities with a call to do penance. Ginevra is invited into the house, and explains to Lisa, just returning from confession, that sin is the salt of all delight.

Francesco explains to Pietro why he is consumed with jealousy. On the painting made by Leonardo, his wife smiles in a way that she has never smiled at him. She has always been reserved and serious towards him, and Francesco wants to solve the enigma of her smile.

Giovanni has come on behalf of the Pope to purchase a pearl form Francesco's famous collection, which is kept in a shrine specifically designed in a way that no one can breathe in it for longer than an hour. In order to preserve the pearls' brightness Lisa has to wear them every night.

Lisa and Giovanni know each other, they have been in love before she was unhappily married to Francesco. Giovanni persuades her to flee with him the next morning, when he will come back to collect the pearl. When Francesco returns, he sees the mysterious smile on his wife's face and suspects he has a rival. He systematically locks all exits, so Giovanni has no other choice than to hide himself in the pearls' shrine. Francesco plays a diabolical game with Lisa, pretending not to have noticed anything, intentionally misinterpreting her unrest and fear for Giovanni's life as love and desire. Lisa goes along with this after Francesco promises her to fulfill a wish. She succumbs to his desire, and then asks for the key to the shrine. Again, Francesco intentionally misinterprets this as her being jealous of the pearls, and to prove his "love" he throws the only key into the river.

=== Act 2 ===
The next morning, Lisa can hardly remember what happened the night before. She blames herself for having done nothing to save Giovanni, and hopes for a sign of life from the shrine, but in vain: Giovanni has suffocated. Lisa's stepdaughter Dianora enters, and gives her the key to the shrine she had found in her boat the night before. Francesco appears, irritated by his wife's self-control. When she presents him with the key, he assumes Giovanni has escaped. Lisa now insists on wearing the pearls, and with a smile she waits for the moment Francesco enters the shrine. She then locks the door behind him.

=== Epilogue ===
The lay brother's story comes to an end. The couple leave and the lay brother thinks he recognises Mona Lisa in the woman.

== Recordings ==
- In 1995 CPO released a 1994 recording, with Klauspeter Seibel conducting the Kiel Philharmonic Orchestra.
- In 2003 Preiser Records released a 1953 live recording from the Städtische Oper Berlin, with Robert Heger conducting, and Inge Borkh, Hans Beirer and Mathieu Ahlersmeyer in the principal roles.
