= Karl Aagaard Østvig =

Norwegian operatic tenor and opera director (1889–1968)

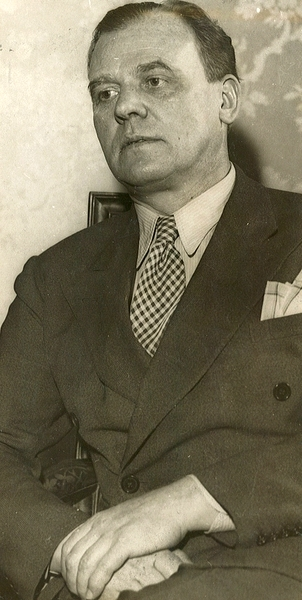
Karl Aagaard Østvig, c. 1938

Karl Aagaard Østvig (sometimes Germanized to Oestvig) (17 May 1889 – 21 July 1968) was a Norwegian operatic tenor, opera director, and voice teacher. The Norwegian Music History Archive states that he is the greatest dramatic tenor in Norwegian history, and that he was particularly admired for his portrayals in operas by Giacomo Puccini, Richard Strauss and above all Richard Wagner. His voice was described by soprano Lotte Lehmann as “a dazzling meteor.” Although he toured internationally in concerts, operas, and recitals, his singing career was mainly centered in Austria and Germany from his debut in 1914 up until his retirement from the stage in 1933. From 1932 on he lived in Oslo where he was primarily active as an opera director and singing teacher. He made only a few recordings during his career, all for Polydor Records.

== Life and career ==
Born in Oslo, Østvig studied singing privately with Wilhelm Cappele Kloed in Germany, and at the Cologne University of Music with Fritz Steinbach and Franz Wüllner. He made his professional opera debut at the Staatsoper Stuttgart in 1914 where he was a resident artist for the next five years. While there he notably created the role of the Lay Brother/Giovanni de Salviati in the world premiere of Max von Schillings's Mona Lisa in 1915. He appeared as a guest artist at Theater Basel in 1917 and at the Bavarian State Opera in 1919.

From 1919 to 1926, Østvig was the leading tenor at the Vienna State Opera (VSO). With that company he performed the role of the Emperor in the world premiere of Richard Strauss's Die Frau ohne Schatten opposite Maria Jeritza as the Empress. He sang opposite Jeritza in many other operas at the VSO, including Bacchus to her Ariadne in Ariadne auf Naxos and Paul to her Marie in Die tote Stadt. His other roles in Vienna included Cavaradossi in Tosca, Don José in Carmen, Manrico in Il trovatore, Pedro in Tiefland, Pinkerton in Madama Butterfly, Siegmund in Die Walküre, Tamino in The Magic Flute, Walther in Die Meistersinger von Nürnberg, and the title roles in Lohengrin, Parsifal, Tannhäuser, and The Tales of Hoffmann. While working at the VSO he married Ines Burmeister Geswein, with whom he had two children, Maren Ine and Olaf, Then years later he separated from her and married the soprano Maria Rajdl. Their daughter, Lillemari Østvig (1924–1999), had a career as a concert and opera soprano, and their son, Karl Aagaard Østvig Jr. (1925–1944), was an actor.

In 1923, Østvig embarked on his first extended concert tour in Europe and North America. He continued to perform regularly in recital for the remainder of his career. In 1926 he was invited to star in operetta productions at the Carltheater. However, the director of the VSO demanded that he reject this offer, and a conflict ensued which ended in Østvig resigning from his position at the VSO. Later that year he appeared as a guest artist at the Hungarian State Opera House and at the Hamburg State Opera. He took a position at the Deutsche Oper Berlin in 1927, working there through 1930 and again as a guest artist for his final opera appearance in 1933. On 16 June 1928 his performance of Max in Jonny spielt auf was interrupted by Nazi demonstration.

In 1932, Østvig moved with his wife to Oslo where they both worked as singing teachers. That year he began directing opera productions in the city, and from this point on his career began to shift away from singing. In 1941, during the German occupation of Norway, he took over the management of the opera house in Oslo. After the war, he was sentenced to two years in prison as a collaborator, and he later lived in retirement in Oslo until his death there in 1968. One of his notable students was tenor Arne Hendriksen.
