= Verstummte Stimmen =

Exhibition project in Germany

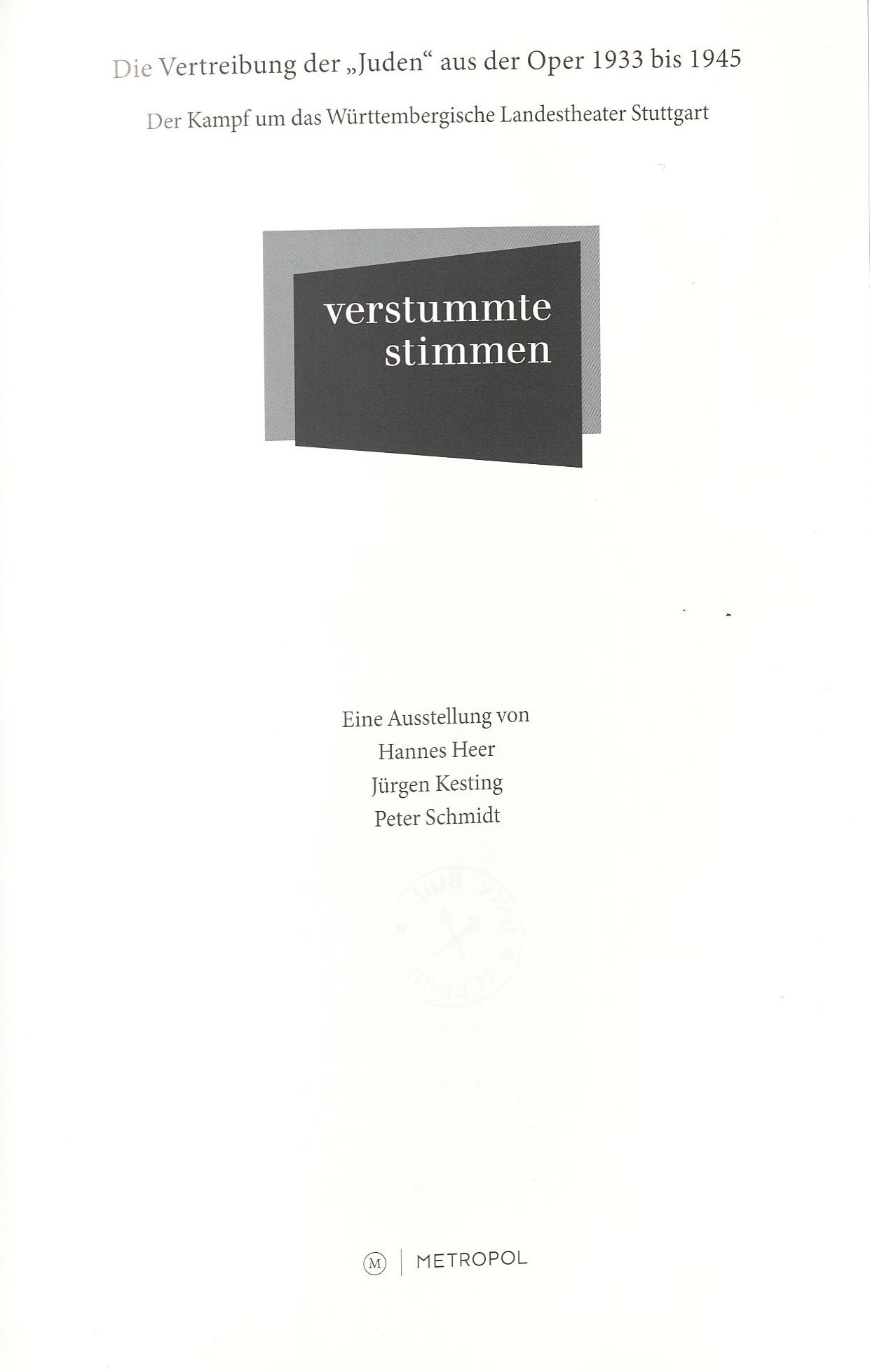
- Poster of travelling exhibition in Stuttgart
- Date: 2006 to 2012, partly permanent
- Location: Opera houses and other venues in; Hamburg; Berlin; Stuttgart; Darmstadt; Dresden; Bayreuth
- Theme: The Expulsion of the 'Jews' from the Opera House from 1933 to 1945
- Organized by: Hannes Heer; Jürgen Kesting; Peter Schmidt
- Website: verstummte-stimmen.de

Verstummte Stimmen (Silenced Voices) is a project of travelling exhibitions by the historian Hannes Heer, the music critic Jürgen Kesting, and the designer Peter Schmidt, beginning in 2006. It covered, as the full title said, Die Vertreibung der 'Juden' aus der Oper 1933 bis 1945 (The Expulsion of the 'Jews' from the Opera House from 1933 to 1945). The project was divided in a general section and local sections. The general section exposed the biographies of 44 people, composers, conductors, directors, and singers, who were engaged at German and Austrian opera houses and became victims of Nazi racism against Jews. The exhibition travelled to several locations, Hamburg, Berlin, Stuttgart, Darmstadt, and Dresden, where additional local sections dealt with the history of expulsion at the individual opera house; the last station was Bayreuth in 2012 where part of it was retained permanently in a park.

Since 2026, Verstummte Stimmen has been online as a digital memorial and research platform.

== History of the exhibition ==
The exhibitions began in Hamburg at both the Hamburg State Opera and the Axel Springer Galerie. The second station was Berlin, at the Berlin State Opera and the Centrum Judaicum at the New Synagogue. The third station was Stuttgart, at the Staatstheater Stuttgart and the House of History Baden-Württemberg. The fourth station was 2009 Darmstadt, at the Staatstheater Darmstadt, the Hessisches Staatsarchiv Darmstadt, and the Heinrich-Emanuel-Merck-Schule. The fifth station was Dresden, from May to July 2011 at the Semperoper. The last station was Bayreuth from 2012, where a part was presented at the town hall, while the general part was exposed in the Richard-Wagner-Park next to the Festspielhaus where it remained, entitled Die Bayreuther Festspiele und die Juden 1876–1945 (The Bayreuth Festival and the Jews 1876 to 1945).

In 2026, the city of Bayreuth, in collaboration with the opera houses involved in the traveling exhibition, launched the digital research and remembrance platform Verstummte Stimmen. The website verstummte-stimmen.de comprises 300 biographies of predominantly Jewish artists and theater staff who, between 1933 and 1945, fell victim to Nazi expulsion from German opera houses.

== General section ==
The larger general section is focused on 44 biographies of people who were expelled from their positions in opera houses, including composers Arnold Schönberg, Kurt Weill, Viktor Ullmann, conductors Fritz Busch, Otto Klemperer, Bruno Walter, singers Gitta Alpár, Vera Schwarz, Delia Reinhardt, Lydia Kindermann, Richard Tauber, Joseph Schmidt, Friedrich Schorr, and Emanuel List.

== Local projects ==
In Hamburg, Berlin, and Stuttgart, around 5% of people engaged at the opera houses were dismissed, driven to exile or transported to concentration camps. In Darmstadt, more than 15% were victims, and eleven additional cases remain unclear.Twenty-five Jewish members of the Hamburg State Opera were dismissed, eight soloists including soprano Sabine Kalter, three conductors, six chorus members, two orchestra players, four theatre physicians, a dramaturge, a director, and the head of the workshop.

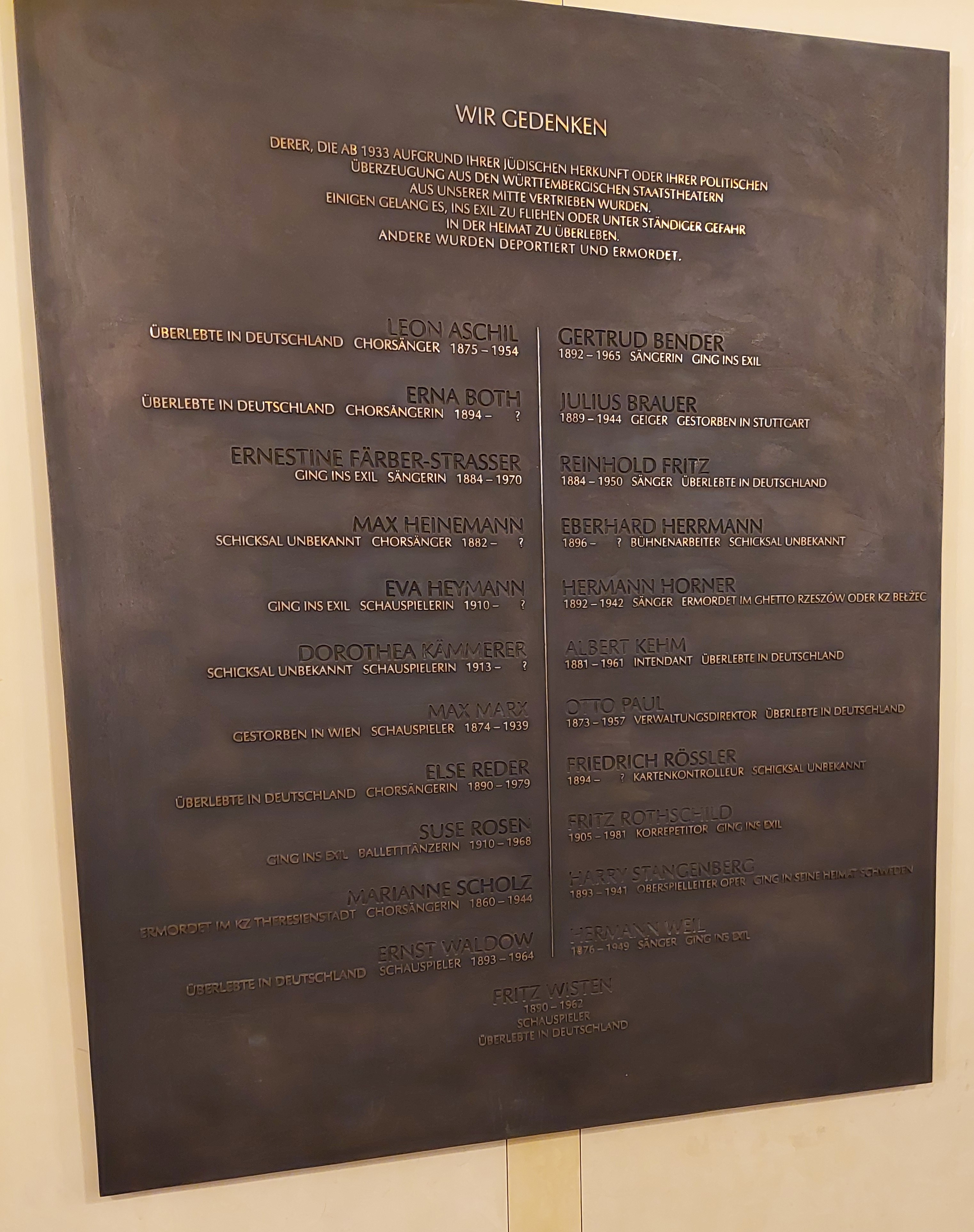
Memorial plaque in the Staatsoper, from 2010

The local exhibition in Stuttgart focused on the dismissal of the intendant, Albert Kehm, and the administrative director, Otto Paul; others were driven away including director Harry Stangenberg, soloists Hermann Weil, Ernestine Färber-Strasser, Hermann Horner, and Reinhold Fritz, chorus members Max Heinemann, Leon Aschil, Elsa Reder and Erna Both, the dancer Suse Rosen, orchestra player Julius Brauer, repetiteur Fritz Rothschild, and actors Eva Heymann, Ernst Waldow and Fritz Wisten. Paul Hindemith, Ernst Krenek, and Lotte Lehmann were also victims; they decided for exile.

The Darmstadt local exhibition of 2009 pointed at a "cleaning process" at the Darmstädter Landestheater; its victims were the intentdant, thirty musicians, dramaturges, actors, scenic designers, and prompters, as well as 29 technical employees. Among the first victims were conductor Hermann Adler and intendant Gustav Hartung who was declared unacceptable; he resigned and went into exile in Switzerland.

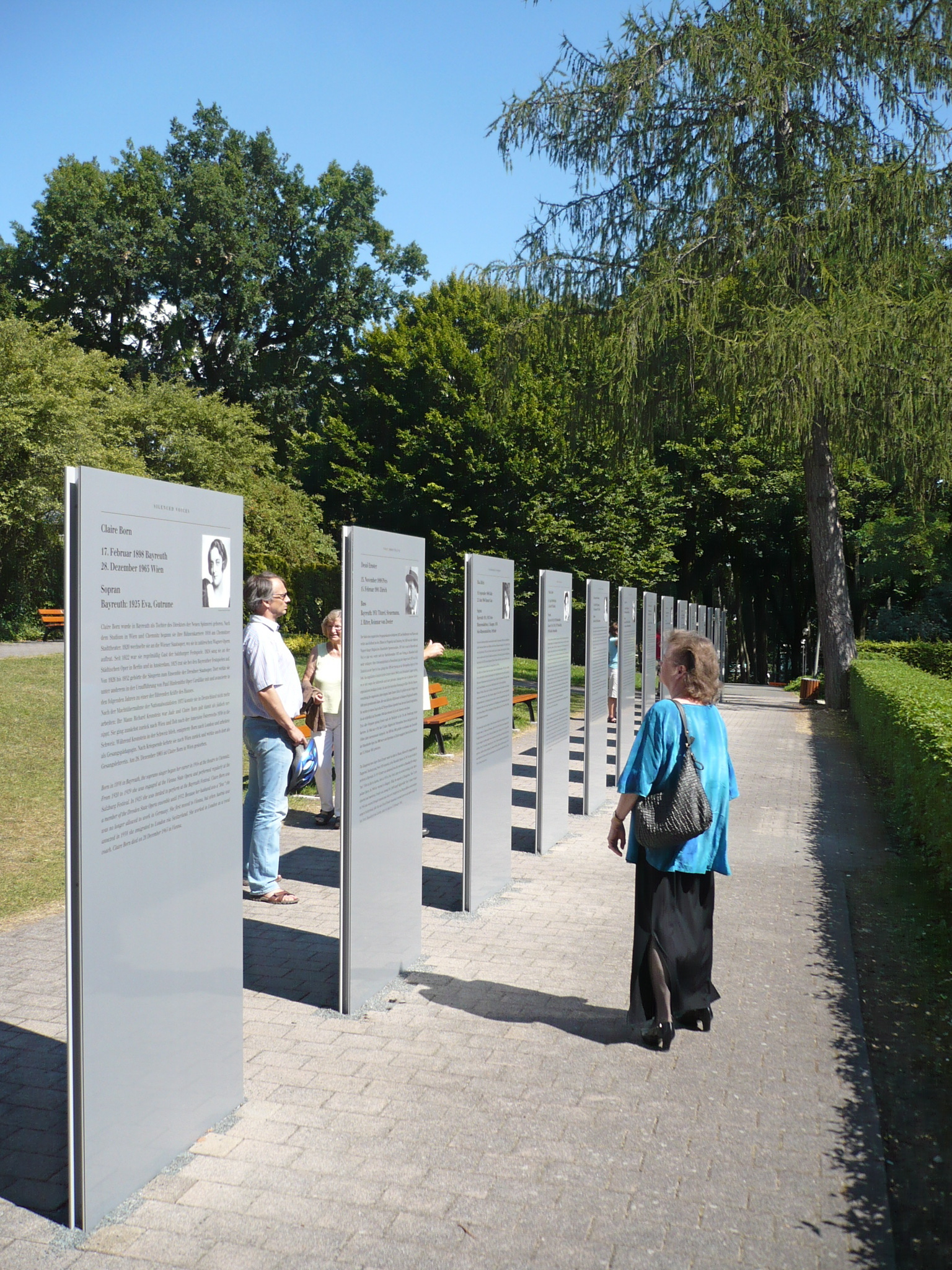
Memorials in the Festival Park

In Bayreuth, part of the exhibition was presented in the new town hall, another part entitled Verstummte Stimmen. Die Bayreuther Festspiele und die Juden 1876–1945 was installed in the park surrounding the Festspielhaus. This part is a memorial to performers of the Bayreuth Festival who were not accepted again, mostly because of Jewish roots. It remains in the park permanently.
