= Barbara Kemp =

German operatic soprano (1881–1959)

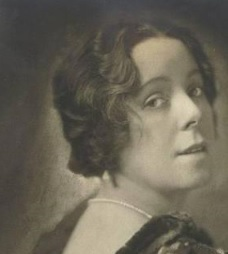
Barbara Kemp

Barbara Kemp (12 December 1881 – 17 April 1959) was a German operatic soprano. After a successful stage career, she retired to teach and also directed performances at the Berlin State Opera.

== Life and career ==
Barbara Kemp was born in Cochem, Germany, and studied singing at the Strasbourg Conservatory. She made her debut in Strasbourg in 1903 in the role of the priestess in Aida. She continued singing roles at local theatres and by 1913 she was employed at the Berlin Hofoper. She interpreted the role of Senta in Der fliegende Holländer at the Bayreuth Festival in 1914 and performed at the Vienna State Opera from 1924 to 1927.

Kemp married opera composer and Berlin State Opera director Max von Schillings in 1923, but continued her performing career. She sang at the Metropolitan Opera from 1922 to 1924, making her debut in the leading role in her husband's opera Mona Lisa. The first run of Mona Lisa included five performances, which were also repeated the next year. Kemp also interpreted the Wagner roles of Kundry in Parsifal and Isolde in Tristan und Isolde at the Met.

Kemp retired from the stage in 1932, and later worked as a singing teacher and director at the Berlin State Opera, producing Schilling's operas Mona Lisa and Ingwelde. Recordings of Kemp include Der Rosenkavalier in 1927, and also a performance at the Berlin State Opera in 1928. She died in Berlin.
