= Florence Millet =

- Born: 1964 (age 61–62); Brussels, Belgium
- Genres: Classical
- Occupations: Pianist, professor
- Instrument: Piano
- Website: www.florencemillet.com

Florence Millet (born 1964) is a Franco-German classical pianist who serves as Professor of Piano and Chair of the Piano Department at the Hochschule für Musik und Tanz Köln.

== Biography ==
Florence Millet was born in Brussels, Belgium. She has performed across the globe in venues and festivals including Salle Pleyel, Théâtre du Châtelet, Carnegie Hall, Kölner Philharmonie, Washington Kennedy Center, Poly Theaters across China in Shanghai, Nanjing, Suzhou, Weihan, Kuhmo Festival, Kneisel Hall, Tanglewood Festival and Festival International de Piano de la Roque d'Anthéron. Millet is a founding member of the Lions Gate Trio. From 1992 to 2000, Millet played with Ensemble InterContemporain in Paris under the direction of Pierre Boulez and David Robertson. Millet received degrees from the Conservatoire National Supérieur de Musique et de Danse de Paris and the State University of New York at Stony Brook.

=== Education ===
Florence Millet studied at the Conservatoire National Supérieur de Musique et de Danse de Paris with Gabriel Tacchino and Jean Hubeau, graduating with Highest Honours at age 18 and receiving First Prize in Piano and Chamber Music. Millet continued her studies at State University of New York at Stony Brook, obtaining a Master and Doctorate in Music and Performance, under Gilbert Kalish and Charles Rosen. Millet was a Fellow at the Tanglewood Music Center from 1988 to 1989 where she received the CD Jackson Award for outstanding achievement by Seiji Ozawa and Leonard Bernstein and was awarded the Florence Gould Fellowship in 1991. Further mentors have included Paul Badura Skoda, Peter Serkin, Georgy Sebok and Leon Fleisher.

== Career ==
=== Performance and collaboration ===
Florence Millet is a founding member of the Lions Gate Trio, and regularly performs with orchestra and in recitals throughout Europe, China, Japan, Canada, USA and South America. She has performance concerti with orchestras including Polish Chamber Orchestra, Orchestre National d'Ile-de-France, Orquesta Sinfonica Simon Bolivar (Venezuela), Calgary Philharmonic (Canada), St Petersburg Philharmonic, the WDR Sinfonieorchester Köln, Orchestre National de Montpellier and the National Radio Orchestra of Romania.

Millet has collaborated with Tbilissi, Camerata, Danel, Martfeld, and Sine Nomine String Quartets, as well as members of the Berlin Philharmoniker, the WDR Sinfonieorchester Köln and the Gürzenich Orchestra.

She has worked closely with composers Luciano Berio, Elliott Carter, Pierre Boulez, John Adams, Johannes Schöllhorn, Jörg Widmann, George Crumb, Hans Werner Henze, Henri Dutilleux, Leonard Bernstein, Nicolas Bacri, and Tristan Murail.

Millet's intra-arts collaborators have included Thanztheater Wuppertal Pina Bausch choreographer Eddie Martinez, Chun Hsien Wu, Szu-Wei Wu, the Tony Cragg Foundation, Van der Heydt Museum, Tanzhaus NRW Düsseldorf, La Fondation Royaumont, and the Phillips Collection.

==== Awards and prizes ====
- Monday Night Musical Prize, William Kapell International Competition, 1988
- Most Outstanding Personality, Bösendorfer Empire Competition in Brussels, 1986
- Lavoisier Scholarship from the French government, 1986/87
- CD Jackson Award from Seiji Ozawa, Tanglewood Music Center, 1988
- Tuition waiver at Stony Brook University, 1989–1991
- Florence Gould Fellowship, Tanglewood Music Festival, 1991

=== Teaching ===
Florence Millet serves as Professor of Piano at the Hochschule für Musik und Tanz Köln since 1998 and was named Chair of the Piano Department in 2016. She has given master classes in France, Spain, Germany, and the US. The Lions Gate Trio has been in residence at the Tanglewood Music Festival, University of North Carolina at Greensboro, Yale University, University of Pittsburgh, The Hartt School at the University of Hartford and the Fairfield Library (CT, USA).

=== Artistic Direction ===
- Artistic Adviser to the Lichterfeld Foundation
- Founder of ODE to JOY Festival at the University of Hartford.
- Founder of Echo aus Montepulciano, a residency of old and new music produced by the European Academy Montepuciano, Palazzo Ricci, Montepulciano.
- Artistic Director of the concert series Cité des Dames in Cologne from 2011 to 2018.

== Discography ==
- Nicolas Bacri, Musique de chambre. Lions Gate Trio. Triton Records, 1996. Double CD
- Gérard Pesson – les Chants Faëz. Florence Millet, piano. Accord Records, 1996. CD.
- Elliot Carter: Night Fantasies, 90 +. Florence Millet, piano. Pianovox, 1998. CD.
- Helps, Moe, Diesendruck, Thomas: Trios. Lions Gate Trio. Centaur Records, 1999. CD.
- Chamber Music of Robert Schumann. Lions Gate Trio. Centaur Records, 2005. Double CD.
- Infinis, F. Nicolas, works for Piano, Violin and Clarinet. Florence Millet, piano; Jeanne-Marie Conquer, violin; Alain Damiens, Clarinet. Triton Records, 2007. CD.
- Schumann/Schubert/Liszt. Florence Millet, piano. Centaur Records, 2007. CD.
- Ravel, Ives & Clarke: Piano Trios. Lions Gate Trio. Centaur Records, 2014. CD.
- Elysion, Chamber music of Detlev Glanert. Ulrike Nahmmacher, violin; Nora Niggeling, viola; Gerald Hacke, clarinet; Florence Millet, piano; Michael Hablitzel, cello. Cragg Foundation, 2014. CD.
- Britania. Ulrike Nahmmacher, violin; Martin Roth, violin; Werner Dickel, viola; Susanne Müller-Hornbach, cello; Gerald Hacke, clarinet; Florence Millet, piano. Cybele Records, 2014. CD.
- Recordings with Radio France (Le Matin des musiciens), 2014. Radio.
