= Das Nusch-Nuschi =

Opera by Paul Hindemith

- Opera by Paul Hindemith
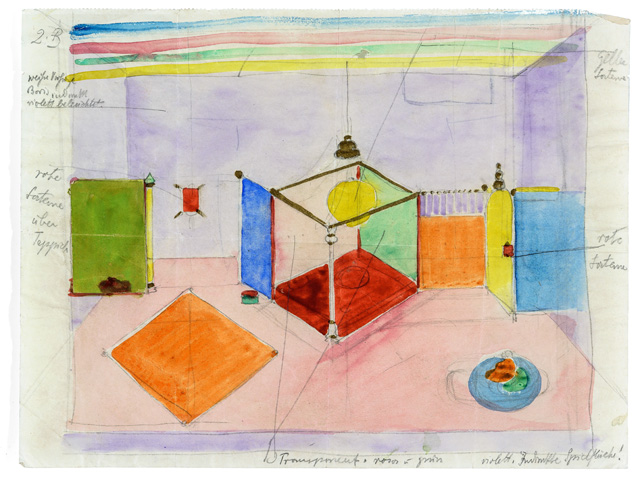
- Oskar Schlemmer's stage design
- Description: A play for Burmese marionettes
- Librettist: Franz Blei
- Language: German
- Premiere: 4 June 1921; Staatstheater Stuttgart

Das Nusch-Nuschi (The Nusch-Nuschi), Op. 20, is an opera in one act by Paul Hindemith, with a German libretto by Franz Blei.

Subtitled A Play for Burmese Marionettes in One Act (Ein Spiel für burmanische Marionetten in einem Akt), it is a staged work with both singers and dancers. It is the second work in a triptych of expressionist one-act operas, the others being Mörder, Hoffnung der Frauen and Sancta Susanna. They are the first operas written by Hindemith. The first two were premiered together at the Württembergisches Landestheater in Stuttgart on 4 June 1921; all three were performed at the Oper Frankfurt in 1922.

== History ==
Das Nusch-Nuschi was the second piece in a triptych of one-act operas by Hindemith influenced by Expressionism. Hindemith experienced World War I as a soldier in Belgium and Northern France. In a second wave of expressionism after the war, he became interested in the movement. It was a period of changes in society. Hindemith describes: "the old world exploded".

Das Nusch-Nuschi is based on a 1904 play by Franz Blei, subtitled "A Play for Burmese Marionettes". Blei was a Wagner enthusiast when he was young, but turned to contributing to the satirical weekly Simplicissimus and wrote plays for the cabaret Die Elf Scharfrichter (The Eleven Executioners), founded in Munich and focused on puppet satire. He had his Nusch-Nuschi reprinted in 1913 in an issue of Die Aktion that was dedicated to his work.

While Mörder, Hoffnung der Frauen deals with brutality between the sexes, Das Nusch-Nuschi is in a way even "more subversive" as it ridicules brutality and intense emotions.

== Roles ==
Roles, voice types, premiere cast
Role	Voice type	Premiere cast, 4 June 1921 Conductor: Fritz Busch
Rag-weng	reciter	
the Nusch-Nuschi, a mythological beast	mime	
Zatwai, seducer of the emperor's 4 wives	mime	
Tum Tum, Zatwai's servant	tenor buffo	Heinrich Lohalm
Mung Tha Bya	bass	Albin Swoboda Jr.
Kyce Waing, an army chief	bass	Reinhold Fritz
Bangsa	soprano	Erna Ellmenreich
Osasa	soprano	
Ratasata	soprano	
Twaise	contralto	
Susulü	tenor	Felix Decken
Kamadewa	tenor	
Master of ceremonies	bass	
Executioner	bass	
Beggar	bass	
First dancer	soprano	
Second dancer	soprano	
First maiden	soprano	
Second maiden	soprano	
Third maiden	contralto	
First poet	tenor	
Second poet	bass	
First herald	bass	
Second herald	tenor	
First monkey	tenor	
Second monkey	tenor	

== Music ==
He composed the work in 1920 and finished it on 14 August of that year. It is playful with elements of slapstick comedy, in contrast with the other two pieces of the triptych. The opera is in the tradition of commedia dell'arte with its stereotype characters. It is a satire on European drama and opera. Hindemith uses traditional musical forms, often in parody. A quote from Wagner's Tristan und Isolde, Marke's "Mir dies!", was regarded as a sacrilege by some of Hindemith's contemporaries. Hindemith comments the third dance: "The following 'choral fugue' (with all mod cons: augmentation, diminutions, stretto and basso ostinato) simply thank their existence to an unfortunate coincidence: they were conceived by the composer. They have no further purpose than this: to incorporate themselves stylishly into the framework of this picture and provide all 'experts' with the opportunity to bark about the incredibly bad taste of their creator. Hallelujah! – It is essential that this piece be danced (or rather wobbled to) by two eunuchs with incredibly fat and naked bellies."

Hindemith also quotes from Till Eulenspiegel by Richard Strauss, and parodies the exotic sounds of Mahler's Das Lied von der Erde, using celesta, mandolin, harp and English horn. He contrasts tender music with "the screeches of two trained monkeys", and parodies the "neo-Baroque" style of Max Reger with a grotesque "choral fugue".

== Performances ==
The opera was first performed, together with Mörder, Hoffnung der Frauen, on 4 June 1921 at the Württembergisches Landestheater in Stuttgart, conducted by Fritz Busch and staged by Otto Erhardt. The artist Oskar Schlemmer was responsible for the stage set, costumes and choreography. The duration is given as 60 minutes.
