= Anna Torge =

German mandolinist and guitarist

Anna Torge is a German mandolinist, guitarist and educator. She has studied both modern and historical mandolin and played on stages around the world.

== Biography ==
Anna Torge began her musical education at the age of three. After finishing school, she studied at the Heidelberg/Mannheim University of Music with Keith Harris (mandolin) and Walter Schumacher-Löffler (guitar). She then enrolled at the Hochschule für Musik und Tanz Köln to study modern and historical mandolin with Marga Wilden-Hüsgen and guitar with Dieter Kreidler. She also studied elementary music education and earned an academic master's degree in music education at the Cologne University of Dance and Music.

=== Performer ===
As a soloist, Torge has performed with the Concerto Köln, the Akademie für Alte Musik Berlin, the Munich Radio Orchestra, the Munich Court Orchestra, the Georgian Chamber Orchestra, the Stuttgart Chamber Orchestra, and others. She has performed as a soloist at venues including the Cologne Philharmonic, the Residenztheater Munich, the Théâtre des Champs-Élysées in Paris and the Walt Disney Concert Hall in Los Angeles, California. She has also performed at festivals such as the Salzburg Festival, the Rheingau Music Festival, the Ludwigsburg Palace Festival, the Mitte Europa Festival, the Herrenchiemsee Festival and at Kempen Klassik.

=== Educator ===
Anna Torge has taught mandolin, baroque mandolin and guitar at the Fürstenfeldbruck and Sauerlach district music schools and has been a speaker at seminars and orchestra rehearsals of the BDZ (Association of German Plucked String Musicians). She teaches the mandolin using the "mother tongue method" developed by the Japanese violinist and music teacher Shinichi Suzuki. With this kind of instruction, the child initially "learns the instrument just like their own mother tongue: through imitation, frequent repetition and initially without sheet music."

=== Distinctions ===
Torge has won several prizes at national and international competitions for mandolin and guitar. She received the Culture Prize of the City of Schrobenhausen in 1997. She was also included in Yehudi Menuhin's Live Music Now program.

== Selected discography ==
- Friends of the Lute (2013). Works by Johann Sebastian Bach, Silvius Leopold Weiss and Ernst Gottlieb Baron. With Axel Wolf, Dorothee Oberlinger, Anna Torge and Christoph Anselm Noll.
- Mandolin concerts (2013). Works by Barbella, Giuliani and Hoffmann. With Anna Torge, the Cologne Academy and Michael Alexander Willens.
- Concerti per molti stromenti (2017). Works by Georg Philipp Telemann. Academy for Early Music Berlin.
- Mandolino e Violino in Italia (2018). Concertos, sonatas and trios by Vivaldi, Arrogni, Capponi and Hasse. With Anna Torge, Mayumi Hirasaki and Il Cantino.
- Mandolino e Fortepiano (2018). Works by Beethoven, Hummel, Leone and Feliziano. With Anna Torge and Gerald Hambitzer.
