= Wolfgang Stockmeier =

- Born: 13 December 1931; Essen, Prussia, German Reich
- Died: 11 December 2015 (aged 83)
- Education: Musikhochschule Köln; Cologne University
- Occupations: Composer; Church musician; Concert organist; Academic; Kirchenmusikdirektor
- Organizations: Musikhochschule Köln; Hallische Musiktage

Wolfgang Stockmeier (13 December 1931 – 11 December 2015) was a German composer, church musician, concert organist and academic. From 1962, he was professor of music theory, organ playing and organ improvisation at the Musikhochschule Köln, and also lectured in Düsseldorf and Herford. He made more than 150 recordings of organ music.

== Career ==
Born in Essen, Stockmeier studied from 1951 music pedagogy and church music at the Musikhochschule Köln. He also studied musicology, German and philosophy at the Cologne University, promoted to PhD in 1957. From 1960, he lectured at the Musikhochschule music theory, organ playing and organ improvisation. He was appointed professor in 1962, and Kirchenmusikdirektor (KMD, director of church music), in 1970. He was director of the department of Protestant church music from 1974, succeeding Michael Schneider. He also lectured at the academies of church music in Düsseldorf and Herford.

Stockmeier played almost 3000 organ concerts and made around 150 recordings, including of the complete organ works by Johann Sebastian Bach. He was from 2008 president of the association Hallische Musiktage which organises the festival Hallische Musiktage of contemporary music.

== Publications ==
Stockmeier's publications are held by the German National Library.

- Die Programmmusik. 1970.
- Musikalische Formprinzipien. 1976.
- Die deutsche Orgelsonate der Gegenwart. 1958.

== Compositions ==
Stockmeier composed around 400 works, both sacred and secular. His work includes an opera on a libretto by Gabriele Wohmann), four oratorios, three symphonies, twelve organ sonatas, three piano sonatas, chamber music and motets.

- Toccata VII für Orgel
- Jauchzt, alle Lande, Gott zu Ehren, Partita, 1968
- 3 Stücke (3 Pieces) for flute, viola and organ, 1968
- Die Versuchung Jesu gospel motet (on Matth. 4:1–11), 1968
- Masse for organ and mixed choir, 1972
- Die Erweckung der Tochter des Jairus, gospel motet (on Matth. 9:18–19 and 3–26), 1976
- Litanei (Martin Luther), Kantionalmotette, 1979
- Verwandlung einer Collage, 1992
- Sechs Praeludien für Orgel, 2003
- Nun komm, der Heiden Heiland, (Advent motet, on "Nun komm, der Heiden Heiland"), 2003
- Sentiment, 2005

== Recordings ==
Stockmeier made more than 150 recordings of organ music, including the complete organ works by Johann Sebastian Bach, and Charles Marie Widor's Eighth Symphony for organ. He received the award Deutscher Schallplattenpreis for two recordings.
