= Jürgen Kesting =

German journalist (1940–2026)

- Kesting c. 2010
- Born: 26 July 1940; Duisburg, German Reich
- Died: 5 June 2026 (aged 85); Hamburg, Germany
- Occupations: Journalist; music critic; writer
- Organizations: FAZ; Neue Stimmen

Jürgen Kesting (26 July 1940 – 5 June 2026) was a German journalist, music critic and author who focused on great voices. After working for record companies, he became a journalist for magazines and newspapers, writing for decades as an influential critic, for the Frankfurter Allgemeine Zeitung from 1997. He authored series for radio stations about great singers and wrote a book in three volumes about the topic in 1986, later expanded to four volumes. He wrote a monograph about Maria Callas in 1990. Both books became standard works, translated into several languages. He used his knowledge of voices as a member of the jury of the singing competition Neue Stimmen from 2005 to 2019. In 2006 Kesting initiated, together with the historian Hannes Heer and the designer Peter Schmidt, a project Verstummte Stimmen (Silenced Voices), a project of exhibitions about victims of Nazi racism against Jews working in opera houses.

== Life and career ==
Born on 26 July 1940 in Duisburg, Kesting studied German and English culture as well as philosophy in Cologne and Vienna from 1960 to 1967. After four years as press officer of Electrola (1969–1971) and the Munich Eurodisc (1971–1973), he worked as editor, department head, managing editor and author for Stern from 1973. In 1993 he changed as an author to the newly founded newspaper Die Woche. In autumn 1997 he developed for Gruner + Jahr the music magazine Amadeo.

After numerous music broadcasts – for WDR, Südwestfunk, Süddeutscher Rundfunk, Bayerischer Rundfunk, SWR, RBB, DR – in 1986 he published a comprehensive study Die großen Sänger in three volumes which was considered a standard work. This was followed in 1990 by a monograph on Maria Callas translated into English, Russian and Japanese, and in 1991 by a book essay on Luciano Pavarotti, translated into English. For thirteen years he produced a weekly music series about great singers for the NDR; for four ARD stations (SFB, NDR, MDR, Süddeutscher Rundfunk) a 26-episodes series about Maria Callas, then also 26 episodes about the pianist Vladimir Horowitz; for the third ARD programs a 13-part TV series Die großen Tenöre der Schellack-Ära. As a freelance author he wrote for the magazines Opernwelt, Fono Forum and Musik und Theater. Since 1997 he was a freelancer for the Frankfurter Allgemeine Zeitung. In 2008 he revised his study Die großen Sänger and brought it up to date, now in four volumes. It is not only an encyclopedic work but relates the art of singing in a context of a history of styles, interpretation and social developments.

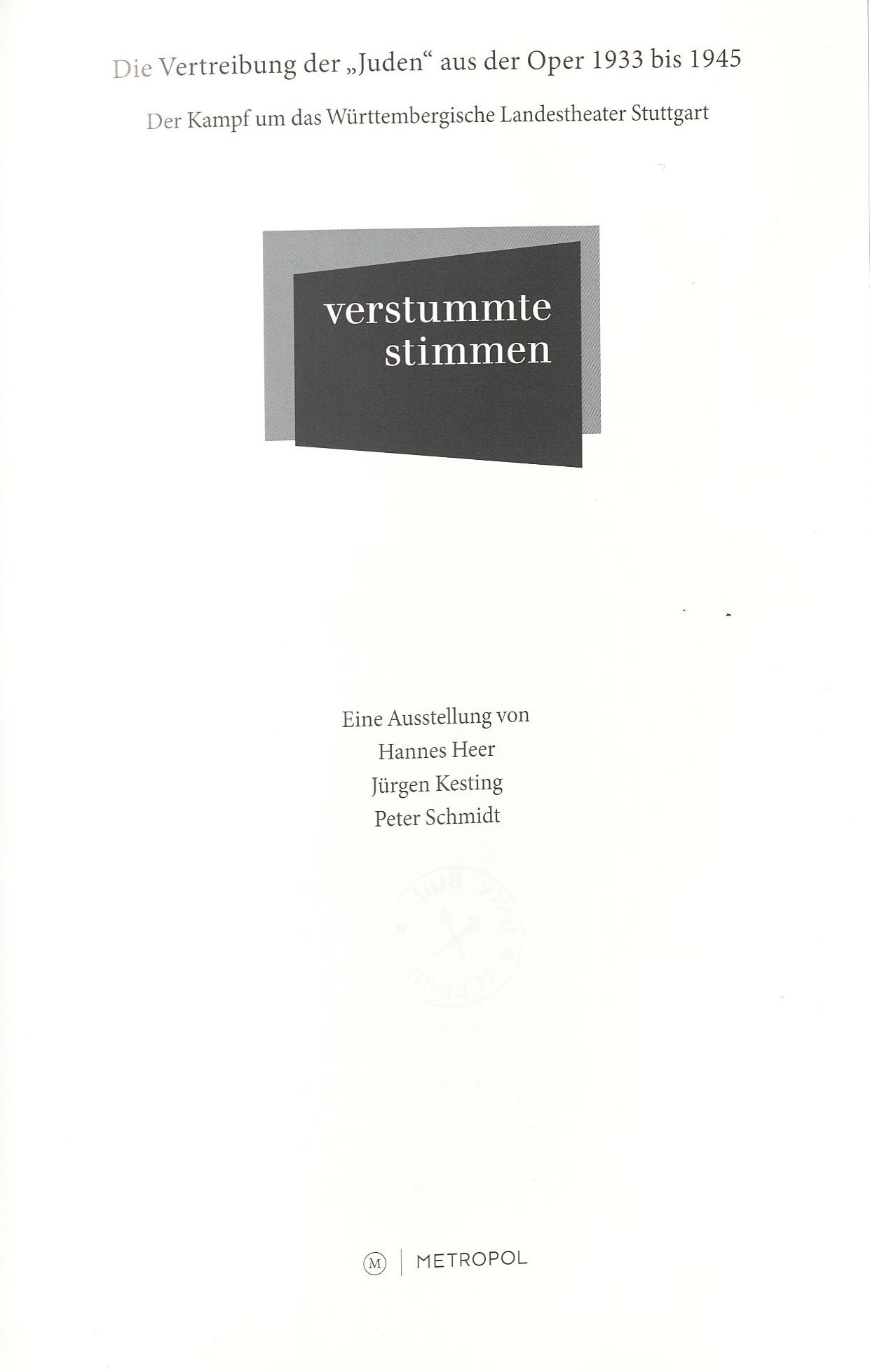
Verstummte Stimmen poster in Stuttgart, 2008

Kesting initiated, together with the historian Hannes Heer and the designer Peter Schmidt, a project of exhibitions beginning in 2006, Verstummte Stimmen (Silenced Voices), about victims of Nazi racism against Jews in German and Austrian opera houses. The exhibition traveled to several locations, finally in 2012 to Bayreuth, where part of it was retained permanently in a park, entitled Die Bayreuther Festspiele und die Juden 1876–1945 (The Bayreuth Festival and the Jews 1876 to 1945).

Kesting was for ten years a member of the program committee of the International Stuttgart Stimmtage. From 2005 to 2019, Kesting was a member of the jury of the singing competition Neue Stimmen.

Kesting was called "pope of voices". A former colleague at NDR notes his encyclopedic knowledge paired with a passion for voices and with precise and creative writing.

His brother was the cultural journalist Hanjo Kesting.

Kesting died in Hamburg on 5 June 2026, at the age of 85.

== Work ==
=== Books ===
- Die Großen Sänger. Claassen Verlag. Düsseldorf, 1986. Three volumes. 2094 pages.
  - Die Großen Sänger. Revised and extended new edition. Hoffmann & Campe, 2008. Four volumes. 2547 pages.
  - Die großen Sänger des 20. Jahrhunderts. Cormoran Verlag im Verlagshaus Goethestraße, 2001. Single volume. 1156 pages.
- Maria Callas. Claassen Verlag. Düsseldorf, 1990. Translated into English, Russian and Japanese.
- Luciano Pavarotti. Econ-Verlag, 1991.
- Händel-Handbuch 2011. 20 encyclopedic entries
- Kleingärten in Städten.
- Verstummte Stimmen: die Vertreibung der "Juden" aus der Oper 1933 bis 1945. Metropol Verlag, 2008.

=== Essays ===
- Von Mund zu Mund und Hand zum Herzen. In Der Kuss. Achtzig Postkarten Bibliophile Taschenbücher. Harenberg. Dortmund, 1979
- Von den Bildern der Welt und dem Bild der Welt. In: Die Chronik des 20. Jahrhunderts. Eine Darstellung in Postkarten. Bibliophile Taschenbücher. Harenberg. Dortmund, 1983
- Die Stimme als Kunstwerk. In: Patrick Barbier: Farinelli. Der Kastrat der König. foreword. Econ-Verlag. Düsseldorf, 1995
- Von den Sprüngen der Zeit. In: André Heller: Jagmandir. Traum als Wirklichkeit. Das exzentrische Privattheater des Maharana von Udaipur. essay as introduction. Edition Christian Brandstädter. Vienna, 1991

=== Television ===
- Die Tenöre des Schellack-Zeitalters. Documentary in 13 parts, First aired: 2 June 1996. Series about the greatest tenors of the first half of the 20th century – from Enrico Caruso to Leo Slezak and Tito Schipa to Richard Tauber. Commentary/texts: Jürgen Kesting, director: Jan Schmidt-Garre (aired also in Italy, France, US; England)
- Jan Schmidt-Garre (dir.): Belcanto – Die Tenöre der Schellack-Zeit. 2017, 74 Min.
