= Knut Hendriksen =

Norwegian opera director (1944–2020)

- Born: 15 March 1944; Bergen, Norway
- Died: 10 March 2020 (aged 75)
- Occupation: Opera director
- Employer: Royal Swedish Opera
- Father: Arne Hendriksen
- Relatives: Ole Bull (great grandfather)

Knut Hendriksen (15 March 1944 – 10 March 2020) was a Norwegian opera director, who worked most of his career at the Royal Swedish Opera in Stockholm.

== Career ==
Hendriksen was appointed at the Royal Swedish Opera in Stockholm from 1969, and stayed there most of his career. His best known productions include The Barber of Seville (by Rossini, staged in 1998), and Tosca (by Puccini, staged in 2004). From 1980 to 1984 he was on leave from Stockholm, while he served as director and manager of the Norwegian National Opera.

== Personal life and death ==
Hendriksen was born in Bergen in 1944, a son of Arne Hendriksen. He was a great-grandson of violinist and composer Ole Bull, about whom he wrote a biography in 2000. He died on 10 March 2020.

== Selected works ==
- Ole Bull. Oslo: Cappelen. 2000. ISBN 9788202195472. OCLC 47133732. Biography.
