= Ulrik Hendriksen =

Danish-Norwegian artist (1891–1960)

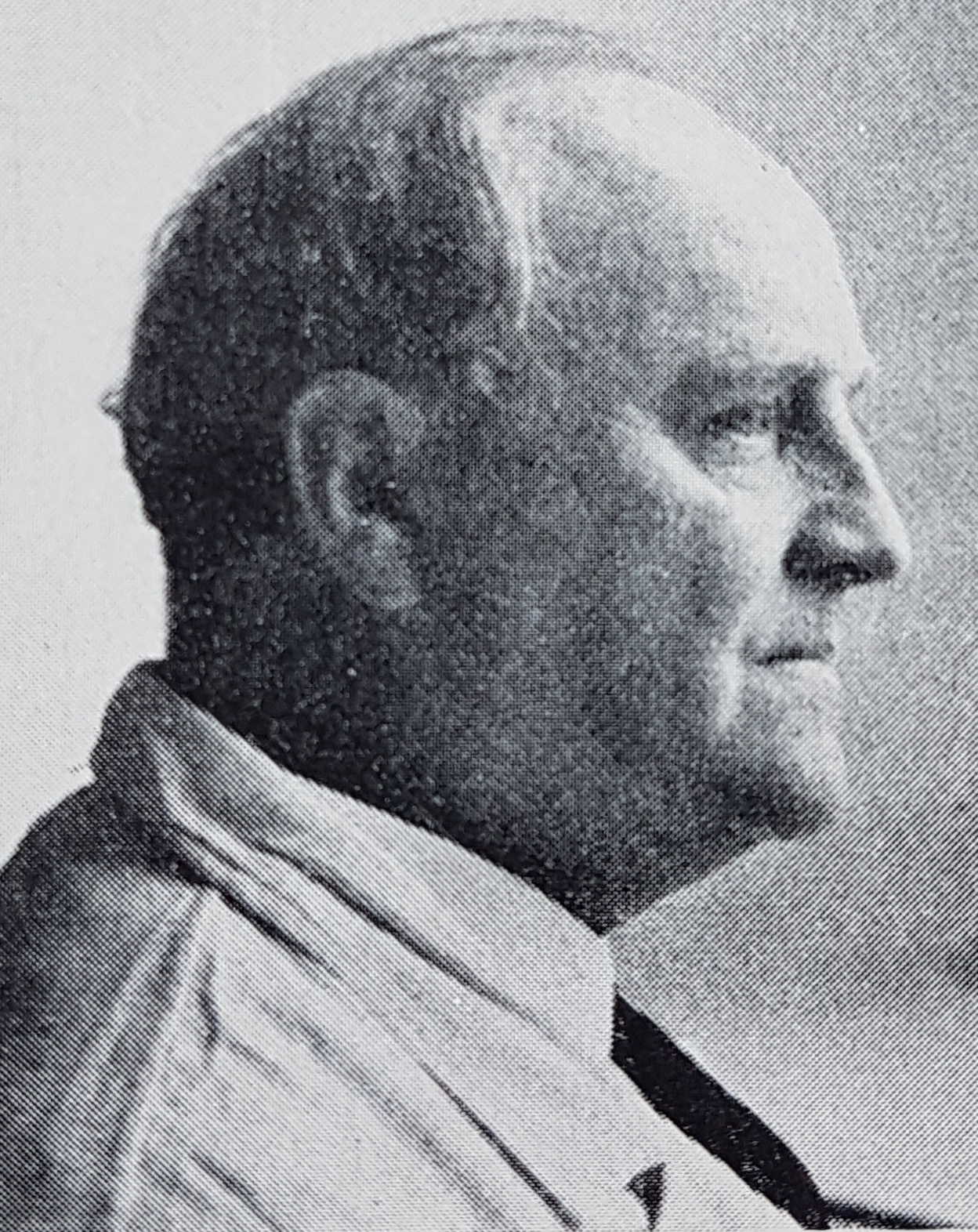
Ulrik Adolph Hendriksen

Ulrik Adolph Hendriksen (March 7, 1891 – January 24, 1960) was a Danish-Norwegian painter and graphic artist.

Hendriksen was born in Faaborg, Denmark. He studied restoration techniques at the Berlin Art Academy from 1909 to 1911 and then moved to Norway, where he was an assistant to Emanuel Vigeland. He was highly involved in church conservation until the Second World War. His work was summarized in 1952 in a large-scale photo exhibition of Norwegian decorative painting art. As a painter, he participated in the Autumn Exhibition (Norwegian: Høstutstillingen) in 1919 and he eventually had a permanent atelier. Hendriksen's paintings were featured at exhibitions in Copenhagen, Rome, and Paris (at the 1931 Paris Colonial Exposition), and he is represented in the National Museum of Art, Architecture, and Design.

Hendriksen was one of the founders of the Young Artists' Society (Norwegian: Unge Kunstneres Samfund) in 1921, and he was an executive member of the Visual Artists Board (Norwegian: Bildende Kunstneres Styre), in which capacity he made important contributions to art policy. He was the father of the artist Egil Weiglin (1917–1997) and the opera singer Arne Hendriksen. The annual Ulrik Hendriksen Memorial Award is named after him. He died in Oslo.

== Awards ==
- Medal of St. Hallvard, 1958
- Order of St. Olav, knight, first class, 1959
