= Adolph Schellschmidt =

American cellist and composer

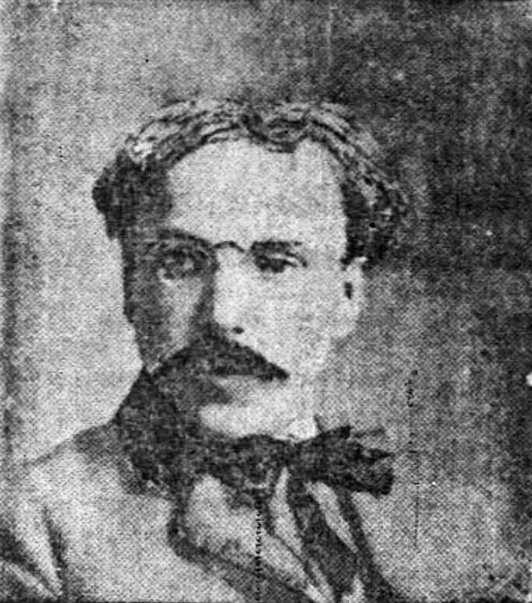
- Adolph Schellschmidt in 1900

Background information
- Born: August 30, 1867; Indianapolis, Indiana, United States
- Origin: Indianapolis, Indiana, United States
- Died: March 18, 1946 (aged 78) Indianapolis, Indiana, United States
- Genres: Classical music Chamber music
- Occupation: Composer; Teacher
- Instruments: Cello; Violin; Piano

Adolph H. Schellschmidt (August 30, 1867 – March 18, 1946) was an American cellist and composer. He wrote, studied, taught and performed classical and chamber music. He was nicknamed "the dean of cellists."

== Early life and education ==
Adolph Schellschmidt was born on August 30, 1867, in Indianapolis, Indiana. He was one of seven siblings. The family was very musical, with all children learning how to play an instrument to participate in the family chamber orchestra. His father, Adolph, taught Schellschmidt how to play the violin when Schellschmidt was ten. Two years later, at the age of 12, he began playing cello after seeing Thedodore Hahn perform in Cincinnati.

Schellschmidt eventually studied under Hahn in Chicago. Schellschmidt also learned how to play clarinet at this time. He lived for a time in New York City, where her performed and was a member of the Musicians Protective Union. When he was 26, Schellschmidt traveled to Europe to study, and played in the first performance of Death and Transfiguration, conducted by Richard Strauss. In Europe, he also studied under Louis Hegyesi. He studied, alongside his sister Emma, at the Cologne Conservatory from 1890 until 1893.

== Career ==
In 1893, Schellschmidt returned to Indianapolis from Europe. He started teaching at the Indianapolis Conservatory of Music. He started performing with the Schliewan String Quartet and co-organized the Kammermusik Society. Eventually, he joined the faculty at DePauw University, where he taught for 17 years and oversaw the glee club. He also taught at Indiana University from 1919 until 1921. He was a member and teacher at the Arthur Jordan Conservatory for 26 years. As of 1898, Schellschmidt taught at his personal studio, alongside his sisters Emma, on harp, and Bertha on violin. He was nicknamed "Schelley" by his students.

== Later life and death ==
Schellschmidt died on March 18, 1946, at his home in Indianapolis after being sick for nine weeks. In tribute, the Arthur Jordan Conservatory yearbook, Opus, was dedicated to Schellschmidt.

== Legacy ==
Schellschmidt's sheet music collection is held in the collection of the Indiana State Library. His papers are in the collection of DePauw University.
