= Murderer, the Hope of Women =

Play by Oskar Kokoschka

Poster by Oskar Kokoschka advertising the première of the play in 1909.

Murderer, the Hope of Women is a short Expressionist play written by the painter Oskar Kokoschka. It focuses more on the actions and appearances of its characters than on their dialogue. Its performance was received with much criticism, as it was a break from classical drama and part of the modernist avant-garde movement in German culture.

== Plot ==
Murderer, the Hope of Women is set in the past, at night in front of a large tower. Action is focused on the characters of "The Man," with his band of Warriors, and "The Woman," with her group of Maidens.

The play begins with the Man riding to the Woman’s tower. The Maidens and Woman see him approaching. The Woman and Man both question each other as to who looked at the other, while the Maidens and Warriors compare the Man to a conqueror and the Woman to a dangerous beast. The Woman feels consumed by the Man’s gaze and says she is devoured by his light. The Man then orders that the Woman be branded with his mark. In response, the Woman stabs the Man. The Warriors deny any knowledge of the Man and run off with the Maidens, locking the Man in the tower. While the Man makes faint movements, the Woman demands to see him again. As the Man slowly recovers, the Woman reciprocally loses her strength. The Woman desperately demands to be set free from the Man’s chains. The Man rises, tears open the door, and kills the Woman with a touch. He kills the Warriors and Maidens in a similar way and then exits through a passage of fire.

== Biographical context ==
Murderer, the Hope of Women has often been called the first Expressionist drama due to its symbolic use of colours, innovative lighting, and the movements of the actors. It was first performed at the Kunstschau Theatre in Vienna in 1909 and caused much controversy on its première. On the night of its first performance, soldiers from a nearby barracks watched the play from the edge of the garden and, upon the Man’s branding of the Woman, rushed through the barrier. Things quickly escalated and a riot soon broke out, for which the police were sent. By means of a connection between the Chief of Police and Kokoschka’s friends and fellow writers Adolf Loos and Karl Kraus, Kokoschka got off with only a warning, rather than being arrested for disturbing the peace. Such strong emotional reaction is characteristic of such work as Kokoschka’s.

The play is characteristic of the internal and external struggle consistent with the artistic and literary works of Vienna at this time, as is evident through the plot. Many of this period’s artistic works pertained to the shortcoming of language in its ability to express emotion. In his biography, Kokoschka describes his battle to come to terms with the "existential malaise" that he felt had gripped the world and the disbelief of the "possibility of individual action or the control of one’s own future." Ultimately, he found solace in the instinct of self-preservation. Still, Kokoschka claimed that an inner voice tormented him with imaginings of the female sex and said that this was the key to Murderer.

== Critical responses ==
Sketch by Oskar Kokoschka of a scene from the play.

When Kokoschka’s play was first performed in 1909, it met with considerable criticism and controversy. Its extreme visual aspects, with its dramatic and disturbing costumes and violent imagery, made it the first Expressionist drama for many critics. The playwright Paul Kornfeld praised the revolutionary drama as a breakthrough art form, calling it a "verbally supported pantomime.".

Many contemporary critics found Murderer, the Hope of Women to be highly disturbing and altogether ineffective. In the 1917 edition of the Frankfurter Zeitung, Bernhard Diebold condemned the play as nothing but a collection of "screaming images" and a "pretentious Decoration Drama." He argued it was utterly devoid of any character development, language, and purpose. Though disagreeing with Diebold on the uselessness of the play’s aesthetic ornament, the critic Robert Breuer also complained about the low importance of language in the play, writing that "the words, which were simultaneously spoken, are remembered only as the subtitles under the extremely powerful images.

The drama critic Walter Sokel has admired the play's departure from realism and its exploration into the surrealism underlying its biblical and mythical allusions. Many interpret the play as an effective theatrical portrayal of Otto Weininger’s idea of gender relations as a battle between man and woman. According to Weininger, sexuality was a conflict between superior male spirituality and debased female bestiality. Such criticism views the defeat of the Woman as the ultimate victory of the spirit over lust. Regardless of the many varying appraisals of its stylistic methods, the play may be read as embodying a clash between aesthetic modernity and masculinity.

== Adaptations ==
Paul Hindemith's expressionist opera in one act Mörder, Hoffnung der Frauen used a 1917 version of the play, revised by Kokoschka himself, as libretto.

The audio collection 'Fantastic Imaginings' produced by Stefan Rudnicki at Skyboat Media and published by Blackstone Audio contains a cast reading of Murderer, the Hope of Women.

== Sources ==
- Albright, Daniel. 2000. Untwisting the Serpent: Modernism in Music, Literature, and Other Arts. University of Chicago Press. ISBN 9780226012544
- Berghaus, Günter. 2005. Theatre, Performance, and the Historical Avant-Garde. Palgrave Studies in Theatre and Performance History ser. New York: Palgrave Macmillan. ISBN 978-0-230-61752-0.
- Kokoschka, Oskar. 1971. My Life. New York: Macmillan. ISBN 978-0-500-01087-7.
- Hamburger, Michael, trans. 1997. Murderer, the Women's Hope. By Oskar Kososchka. In Schürer (1997a, 1-5).
- Kuhns, David F. 1997. German Expressionist Theatre: The Actor and the Stage. New ed. Cambridge: Cambridge UP, 2006. ISBN 978-0-521-03522-4.
- Ritchie, J[ames] M[cPherson], ed. 1968a. Seven Expressionist Plays. Trans. J. M. Ritchie and H. F. Garten. German Expressionism ser. London: John Calder. ISBN 978-0-7145-4343-7.
- ---. 1968b. Introduction. In Ritchie (1968a, 7-22).
- ---, trans. 1968c. Murderer Hope of Womankind. By Oskar Kokoschka. In Ritchie (1968a, 25-32).
- Schürer, Ernst, ed. 1997a. German Expressionist Plays. The German Library ser. vol. 66. New York: Continuum. ISBN 978-0-8264-0950-8.
- ---. 1997b. Introduction. In Schürer (1997a, vii-xxi).
- Schvey, Henry I. 1982. Oskar Kokoschka: The Painter as Playwright. Detroit: Wayne State UP. ISBN 978-0-8143-1702-0.
- Spreizer, Christa. 2005. "The Spirit of Expressionism: Ex Machina." A Companion to the Literature of German Expressionism. Ed. Neil H. Donahue. Rochester, NY: Camden House. ISBN 978-1-57113-455-4.
- Styan, J[ohn]. L[ouis]. 1981. Expressionism and Epic Theatre. Cambridge and New York: Cambridge UP. ISBN 978-0-521-29630-4. Vol. 3 of Modern Drama in Theory and Practice. 3 vols.
