= Hedy Iracema-Brügelmann =

German operatic soprano

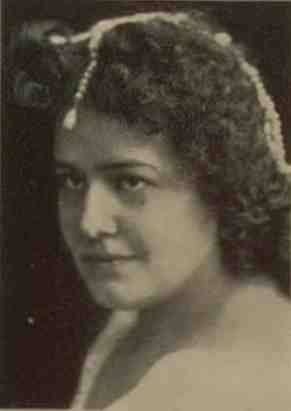
Hedy Iracema-Brügelmann

Hedy Iracema-Brügelmann (1879–1941) was a German operatic soprano of Brazilian birth. In 1916, she was awarded the Charlottenkreuz.

== Professional career ==
Born Hedwig Hänsel in Porto Alegre, Iracema Brügelmann was the daughter of German parents who had emigrated to Brazil. She later married the merchant and bank director Theodor Brügelmann who was the grandson of industrial pioneer Johann Gottfried Brügelmann. Their son, Hermann Brügelmann, became a notable politician. Her adopted artist name, Iracema, is an anagram of the word America.

Iracema-Brügelmann studied singing at the Cologne Conservatory. On the advice of composer/conductor Max von Schillings she chose a career in the theatre, after already having established herself as a concert singer. She made her debut at the Hofoper in Stuttgart in 1910 as Elisabeth in Wagner's Tannhäuser. In 1913, she made a guest appearance at the Royal Opera House in Covent Garden as the Marshallin in Richard Strauss' Der Rosenkavalier, a role she also sang at the Zurich Opera in 1917. On 26 September 1915, she sang the title-role in the world premiere performance of Max von Schillings' opera Mona Lisa, a role she also sang in Amsterdam in 1916.

She was a member of the Vienna State Opera from 1917 until 1920, and from 1920 until 1926 she worked at the Badisches Staatstheater Karlsruhe. She had to end her professional singing career due to health problems. After retiring from the stage, she worked as a singing teacher in Karlsruhe. She died in that city in 1941.
