= Erna Ellmenreich =

German operatic soprano (1885–1976)

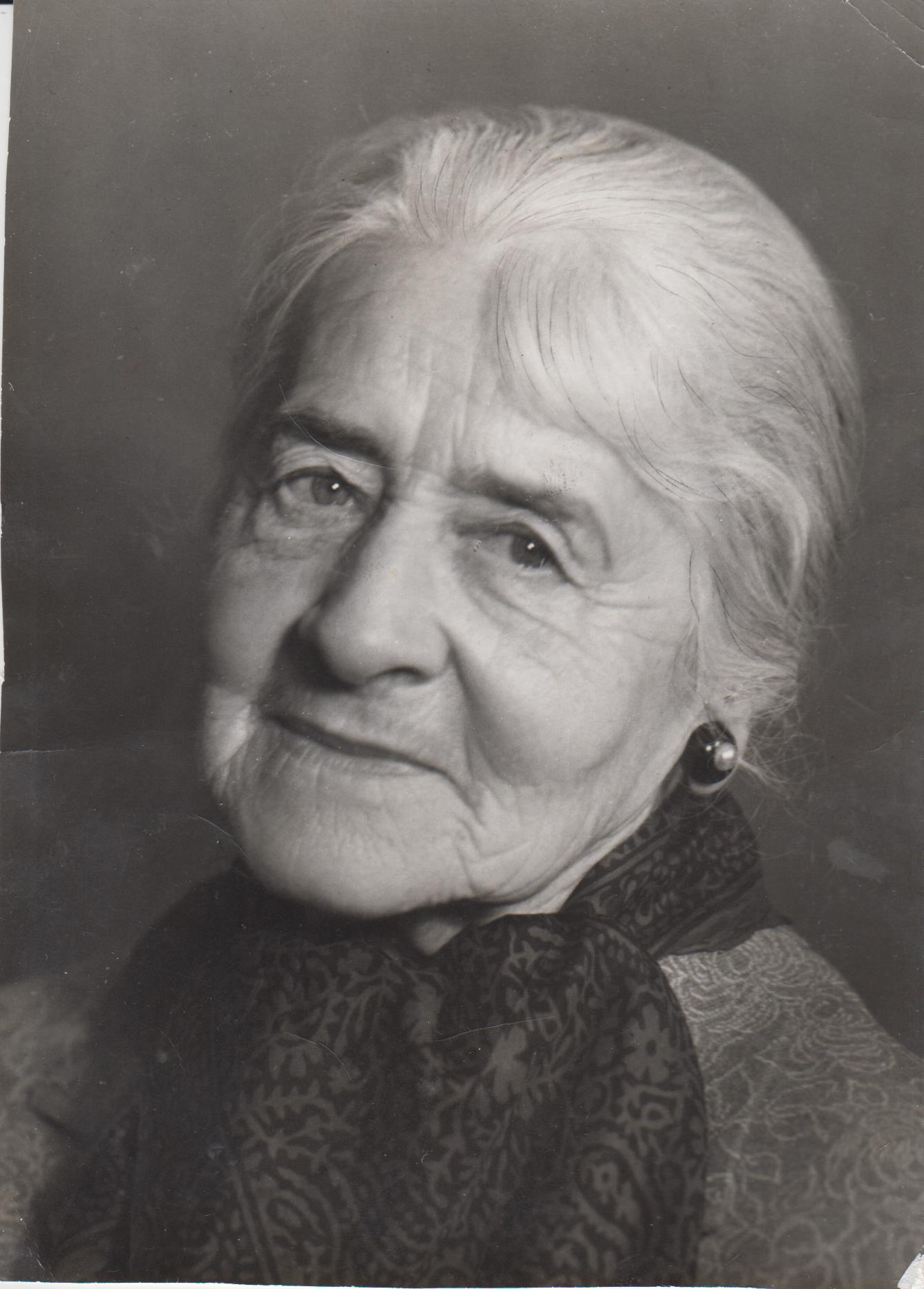
- Erna Ellmenreich, c. 1965
- Born: 30 May 1885; Meran
- Died: 14 April 1976 (aged 90); Berlin
- Occupation: Operatic soprano
- Organizations: Staatstheater Stuttgart

Erna Ellmenreich (30 May 1885 – 14 April 1976) was a German operatic soprano, a member of the Staatstheater Stuttgart. She performed there leading parts and several premieres, including Ariadne auf Naxos by Strauss and works by Paul Hindemith.

== Career ==
Born in Merano, Ellmenreich made her stage debut as Marguerite in Gounod's Faust in 1908 at the Hoftheater Stuttgart (court theatre). She was a member of the company from 1909 to 1924. It was named Württembergisches Landestheater from 1918, and later Staatstheater (State theatre). She appeared as a guest artist, for example in 1910 at the Cologne Opera and in 1916 at the Frankfurt Opera.

In Stuttgart, Ellmenreich took part in numerous premieres. On 25 October 1912 she appeared as Echo in Ariadne auf Naxos by Richard Strauss. The production was part of the opening festivities for the new theatre building, staged in the Kleines Haus (small hall) by Max Reinhardt, with Maria Jeritza in the title role. In 1917 Ellmenreich performed the part of the Märchenfrau in Siegfried Wagner's fairy-tale opera An allem ist Hütchen schuld!, and in 1919 in Ture Rangström's Die Kronbraut (Kronbruden) after a play by August Strindberg. On 4 June 1921 she appeared in two roles in one-act operas by Paul Hindemith, the Woman in Mörder, Hoffnung der Frauen (Murderer, Hope of Women) after a play by Oskar Kokoschka, and the Empress Bangsa in Das Nusch-Nuschi. The first presentation of the two short operas by Hindemith, conducted by Fritz Busch and with Oskar Schlemmer responsible for stage, costumes and choreography, caused a scandal.

Ellmenreich's operatic parts included Mozart's Cherubino in Le nozze di Figaro and Dorabella in Così fan tutte, and Silla in Hans Pfitzner's Palestrina. She performed the title roles of Mignon by Ambroise Thomas and Bizet's Carmen, of both Der Rosenkavalier and Salome by Strauss, and Puccini's Madama Butterfly.

After leaving the Stuttgart opera, Ellmenreich performed as a guest artist. She also had a career as a concert singer. She died in Berlin.
