= Arne Hendriksen =

Swedish opera singer

Arne Olav Weiglin Hendriksen (1 January 1911 – 5 November 1996) was a Norwegian-Swedish ceramic artist and opera singer (tenor).

== Biography ==
Hendriksen was born in Berlin, Germany. He was trained as a ceramic artist, but had a talent for singing. After studying with Karl Aagard Østvig (1889–1968), he made his debut at Christiania (now Oslo) in 1938. Engaged at the National Theatre in 1940, he worked at Den Nationale Scene in Bergen from 1942 to 1946, before settling in Sweden, where he sang some forty roles at the Stockholm Opera from 1947 to 1964. These included his debut Nemorino and Mozart roles, leading onto Italian Bel canto and Herod in Salome. He appeared at times at the Norwegian National Opera and Ballet and enjoyed success as the main character in The Tales of Hoffmann in 1954, as well as in other productions. He also appeared at the Volksoper in Vienna and he toured the United States. He recorded Don José and Iopas and appeared in the Ingmar Bergman 1975 film The Magic Flute.

== Personal life ==
He was the son of artist Ulrik Hendriksen (1891–1960) and was married to Anne Margrethe, who was Ole Bull's granddaughter. Their son was the opera producer Knut Hendriksen (1944–2020). Hendriksen died at Täby in Stockholm.
