= Kurt Overhoff =

Austrian conductor and composer

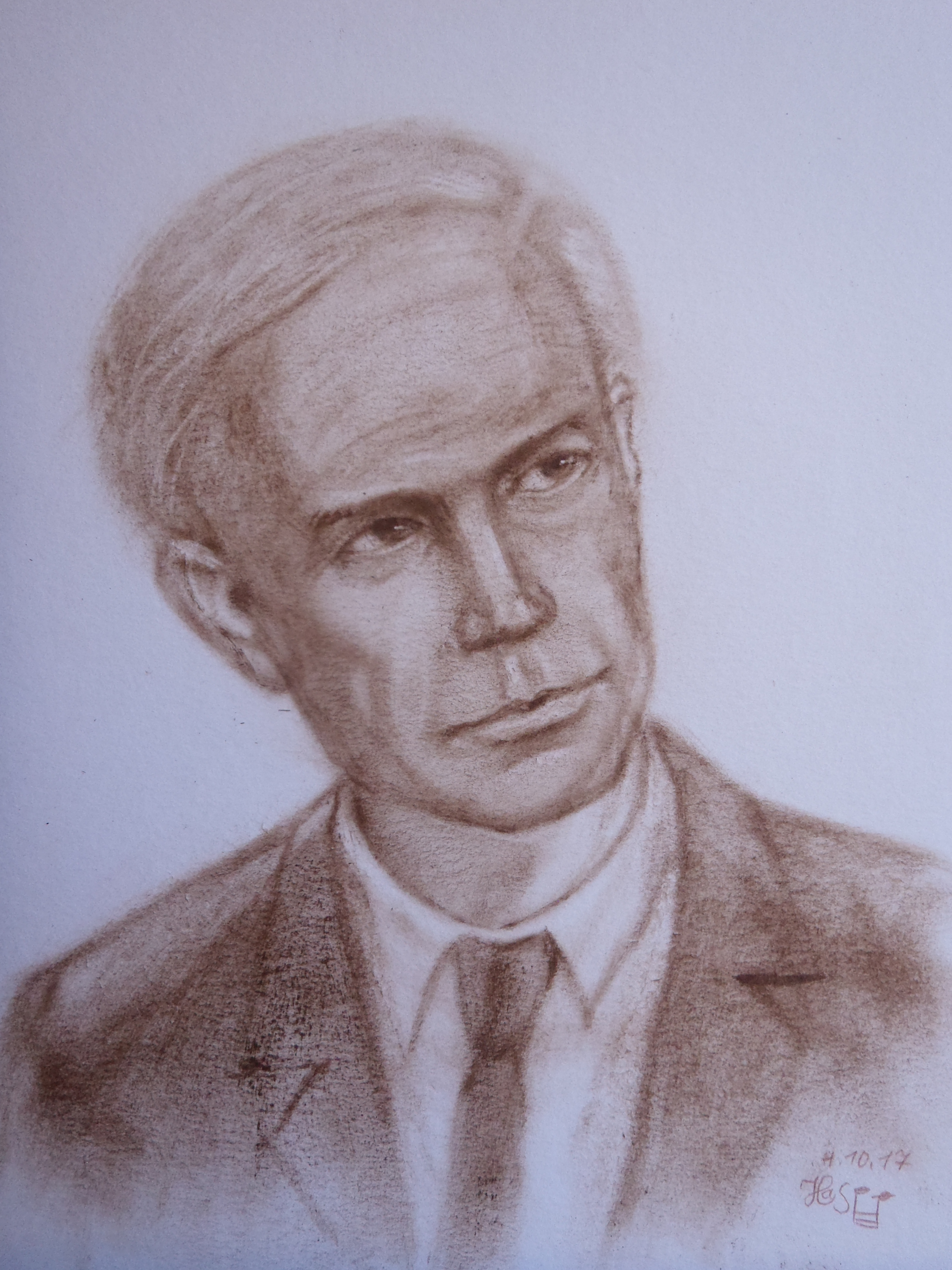
- Kurt Overhoff

Background information
- Born: October 20, 1902; Vienna, Austria
- Died: November 16, 1986 Salzburg, Austria
- Occupation(s): conductor, composer
- Years active: 1920s–1980s

Kurt Overhoff (20 October 1902, in Vienna – 16 November 1986, in Salzburg) was an Austrian conductor and composer.

Largely self-taught in music and conducting, he started at the Vienna State Opera as an assistant to its director Franz Schalk and the conductor Wilhelm Furtwängler. In 1929 he became music director of the city of Koblenz, then in 1932 general music director in Heidelberg, where he remained until 1940. He was the tutor of Wieland Wagner from 1940 to 1950, concerning the musical structure and dramatic themes of Richard Wagner's operas. A product of their work together is Overhoff's Die Musikdramen Richard Wagners: Eine thematisch-musikalische Interpretation, published after Wieland Wagner's death. In 1943 he was appointed general music director of the Landestheater Altenburg, with Wieland Wagner as the opera company's chief producer, and they collaborated on a production of Wagner's Der Ring des Nibelungen, which was broken off when the German theaters were closed in September 1944; Das Rheingold could not be staged. After the war, Overhoff founded the Bayreuth Symphony Orchestra, which he conducted from 1947 to 1950 when it was dissolved. He was a musical assistant at the first postwar Bayreuth Festival in 1951, but criticized one of Wieland Wagner's designs for Parsifal, after which Wagner broke off relations with him. He also taught in the United States, and in 1962 became professor at the Mozarteum in Salzburg.

Overhoff's musical compositions include Bios Abschiedsgesang, for soprano, string quartet, and piano, and the opera Mina, premiered in Essen in 1925.

== Bibliography ==
- Overhoff, Kurt, Richard Wagner's germanisch-christlicher Mythos. Kronos-Verlag - E. C. Frohloff, 1955.
- Overhoff, Kurt, Die Musikdramen Richard Wagners: Eine thematisch-musikalische Interpretation. Salzburg: Verlagsbuchhandlung Anton Pustet, 1967.
- Skelton, Geoffrey, Wieland Wagner: The Positive Sceptic. New York: St. Martin's Press, 1971.
- Wessling, Berndt W., Wieland Wagner: Der Enkel. Cologne: Tongen Musikverlag, 1997.
- Kapsamer, Ingrid, Wieland Wagner: Wegbereiter und Weltwirkung, Salzburg: Styria Books, 2010.
