= Death's Messengers =

German fairy tale

Folk tale
- Name: Death's Messengers
- Country: Germany
- Published in: Grimms' Fairy Tales

"Death's Messengers" (German: Die Boten des Todes) is a German fairy tale collected by the Brothers Grimm, tale number 177.

== Synopsis ==
Death comes across a giant and is badly beaten. The young man comes across the beaten-down Death and helps him up. The grateful Death promises the young man that, though he cannot spare the young man, when the time comes he will send messengers beforehand to warn the young man of his death.

Many years later, the man, no longer young, is caught by surprise when Death comes for him. The man complains to Death that Death did not send messengers beforehand to warn him as Death had promised. But Death points out that he had, in fact, sent messengers: illness, the signs of aging, and sleep. The man then allows Death to take him without further complaint.
