= Frederick and Catherine =

German fairy tale

Folk tale
- Name: Frederick and Catherine
- Also known as: Freddy and Katy Lizzy
- Aarne–Thompson grouping: ATU 1387, ATU 1385, ATU 1291B, ATU 1291, ATU 1653A, ATU 1653, ATU 1383, ATU 1791
- Country: Germany
- Published in: Grimms' Fairy Tales

"Frederick and Catherine" (also called "Freddy and Katy Lizzy") is a German fairy tale collected by the Brothers Grimm in Grimm's Fairy Tales, number 59.

It combines several Aarne-Thompson types: 1387, A Woman Draws Beer in the Cellar; 1385*, A Woman Loses Her Husband's Money; 1291B, A Fool Greeses the Cracked Earth with Butter; 1291, Sending One Cheese After Another; 1653A, Securing the Door; 1653, The Robbers under the Tree; 1383, A Woman Does Not Know Herself; and 1791, Dividing Up the Dead.

== Synopsis ==
Frederick and Catherine are husband and wife. He leaves to do his work. She starts to fry a sausage and thinks she can get a beer while it is cooking. In the cellar, drawing it, she realizes the dog is loose and might eat the sausage, but the dog has already done so. She chases it but cannot catch it. Meanwhile, the keg of beer empties itself into the cellar. To hide this, she uses flour she bought at a fair to dry it. Frederick is furious hearing this.

Frederick has some gold, but tells his wife it was counters for games and hides it in the house, warning her to leave them alone. Peddlers come by and Catherine offers them the counters. When Frederick finds out, they set out in pursuit, and Catherine, falling behind, seeing ruts in the road, smears butter in the ruts to protect the earth. When a cheese rolls out of her pocket, she sends another to fetch it back, and then all the rest! Frederick sends her back to make sure their home is secure. She brings back dried pears, vinegar, and the lower half of the door. At night, they climb a tree. The peddlers come and sit down underneath their tree. She tries of holding onto her things and lets go of them, one by one. The thieves mistake the pears for leaves, and the vinegar for dew. The noise made by the door as it falls terrifies them, as they think the Devil himself is coming, so they flee. The couple get their gold back in the morning and go home.

Frederick sends Catherine out to cut the grain. Sleepy after eating, she cuts half her clothing off; half-naked, she does not know if she is herself or not. She goes home, knocks on her husband's window and asks him if Catherine is home. He says she is, so Catherine runs away.

Catherine meets some thieves and offers to help them. When they agree, she goes about calling out and asking if people have anything they can steal.

Peeved, the thieves tell Catherine to pull up beets in the pastor's garden. A man sees her and tells the pastor that the Devil is in his garden. As the pastor is lame, the man carries him to the garden, but at the sight of her, they run off, the lame pastor running faster than the man who helped him.
