= Beatrice von Dovsky =

Austrian poet, writer, and actress (1866–1923)

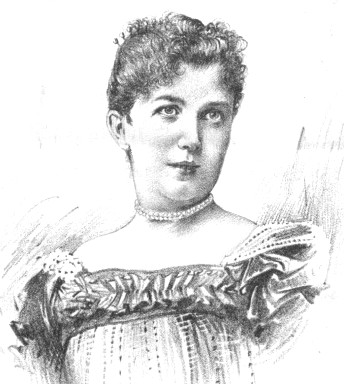
Beatrice von Dovsky

Beatrice von Dovsky (14 November 1866, Vienna – 18 July 1923, Vienna) was an Austrian poet, writer, and actress. She is best known for writing the libretto for Max von Schillings's opera Mona Lisa which she presented to the composer in the spring of 1913. The subject was very topical at the time, because the painting by Leonardo da Vinci had been stolen from the Louvre in 1911, and rediscovered in Florence in 1913. The opera premiered successfully at the Staatsoper Stuttgart in September 1915, and, while not part of the standard opera repertory, has been commercially recorded three times and revived numerous times by major opera houses throughout the 20th century.

Dovsky's other works include poems, short stories and works for children. Her fairy tales are among her more well known works, including Der Wiener Fratz, Die Gnä' Frau, and Zwölf Märchen aus der Ostmark among others. She was also active as a stage actress in Vienna. She died in 1923 at the age of 57 and is buried in the Hietzinger Cemetery.

The Dovskygasse, a street in the 13th municipal District of Vienna, Hietzing, was named after her.
