= Mörder, Hoffnung der Frauen =

Opera by Paul Hindemith

- Opera by Paul Hindemith
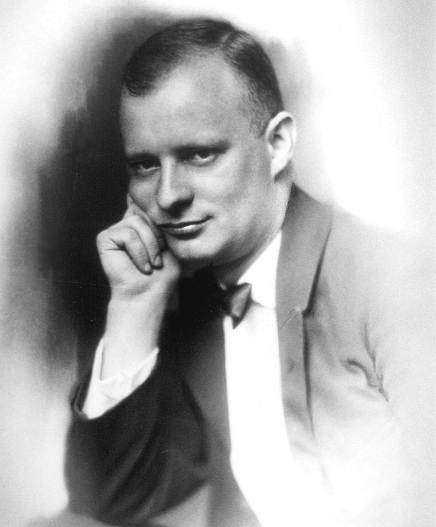
- The composer in 1923
- Translation: Murderer, Hope of Women
- Librettist: Oskar Kokoschka
- Language: German
- Based on: Kokoschka's play Mörder, Hoffnung der Frauen
- Premiere: 4 June 1921; Landestheater Stuttgart

Mörder, Hoffnung der Frauen (Murderer, Hope of Women) is an opera in one act by Paul Hindemith, written in 1919 on a German libretto by Oskar Kokoschka which he based on his play of 1907. The opera was the first in a triptych of expressionist one-act operas, the others being Das Nusch-Nuschi, and Sancta Susanna. They were the first operas written by Hindemith. The first two were premiered together in Stuttgart on 4 June 1921, all three were performed at the Oper Frankfurt in 1922.

== History ==
Mörder, Hoffnung der Frauen was the first piece in a triptych of one-act operas by Hindemith influenced by Expressionism. The artist and writer Oskar Kokoschka wrote the play of the same name in 1907 and modified it several times. Hindemith experienced World War I as a soldier in Belgium and Northern France. In a second wave of expressionism after the war, he became interested in the movement and composed the work in 1919. He based it on the last version of the play, which he set with only few cuts. The musicologist Joel Haney notes that he "attempts to give mythic expression to a violent struggle between the sexes".

The opera was first performed, together with Das Nusch-Nuschi, on 4 June 1921 at the Landestheater Stuttgart, conducted by Fritz Busch and staged by Otto Erhardt. The artist Oskar Schlemmer designed the stage set, costumes and choreography. The duration is given as 24 minutes.

== Roles ==
Roles, voice types, premiere cast
Role	Voice type	Premiere cast, 4 June 1921 Conductor: Fritz Busch
Man	baritone	Theodor Scheidl
Woman	soprano	Erna Ellmenreich
First soldier	tenor	
Second soldier	bass	
Third soldier	tenor	
First maid	soprano	
Second maid	contralto	
Third maid	soprano	

== Music and reception ==
The conductor Leon Botstein describes the work as "more symphonic than operatic", structured in four distinct sections, equivalent to the movements of a symphony. Hindemith draws on models from Richard Strauss regarding instrumentation, from Franz Schreker's "opulence", and Richard Wagner's lyricism, at times in irony, for example when the second theme alludes to Tristan und Isolde. The musicologist Giselher Schubert summarizes: "Direct expression and deliberate formal design are not at odds in this expressionism, but rather rely on each other."

The premiere resulted in a succès de scandale: while some critics appreciated "a composer of enormous talent and promise", negative responses established Hindemith’s "reputation as a young upstart".

== Performances and recordings ==
The opera was recorded in 1987 by the Rundfunk-Sinfonieorchester Berlin and the RIAS Kammerchor, conducted by Gerd Albrecht, with Franz Grundheber as the Man and Gabriele Schnaut as the Woman.

== Bibliography ==
- Casaglia, Gherardo (2005). "Mörder, Hoffnung der Frauen, 4 June 1921". L'Almanacco di Gherardo Casaglia (in Italian).
- Albrecht, Gerd (1987). "Paul Hindemith: Mörder, Hoffnung der Frauen / Der Dämon" (in German). WERGO.
- Botstein, Leon (1996). "Murderer, Hope of Women, Op. 12 (1919)". American Symphony Orchestra.
- Haney, Joel (2008). "Slaying the Wagnerian Monster: Hindemith, Das Nusch-Nuschi, and Musical Germanness after the Great War". The Journal of Musicology. 25 (4). University of California Press: 339–393. doi:10.1525/jm.2008.25.4.339. JSTOR 10.1525/jm.2008.25.4.339.
- Kingsbury, Stephen. Paul Hindemith Compositions at AllMusic. Retrieved 12 March 2017.
- Schubert, Giselher (2004). "Hindemith's Opera Trilogy". American Symphony Orchestra.
- Skelton, Geoffrey (1992). "Mörder, Hoffnung der Frauen". In Sadie, Stanley (ed.). The New Grove Dictionary of Opera. London. doi:10.1093/gmo/9781561592630.article.O903315. ISBN 0-333-73432-7.
- "Mörder, Hoffnung der Frauen / Oper in einem Akt / Text von Oskar Kokoschka" (Work details, synopsis, performances). Schott.
