= Hochschule für Musik und Tanz Köln =

Music school in Cologne, Germany

Coordinates: 50°56′51″N 6°57′40″E

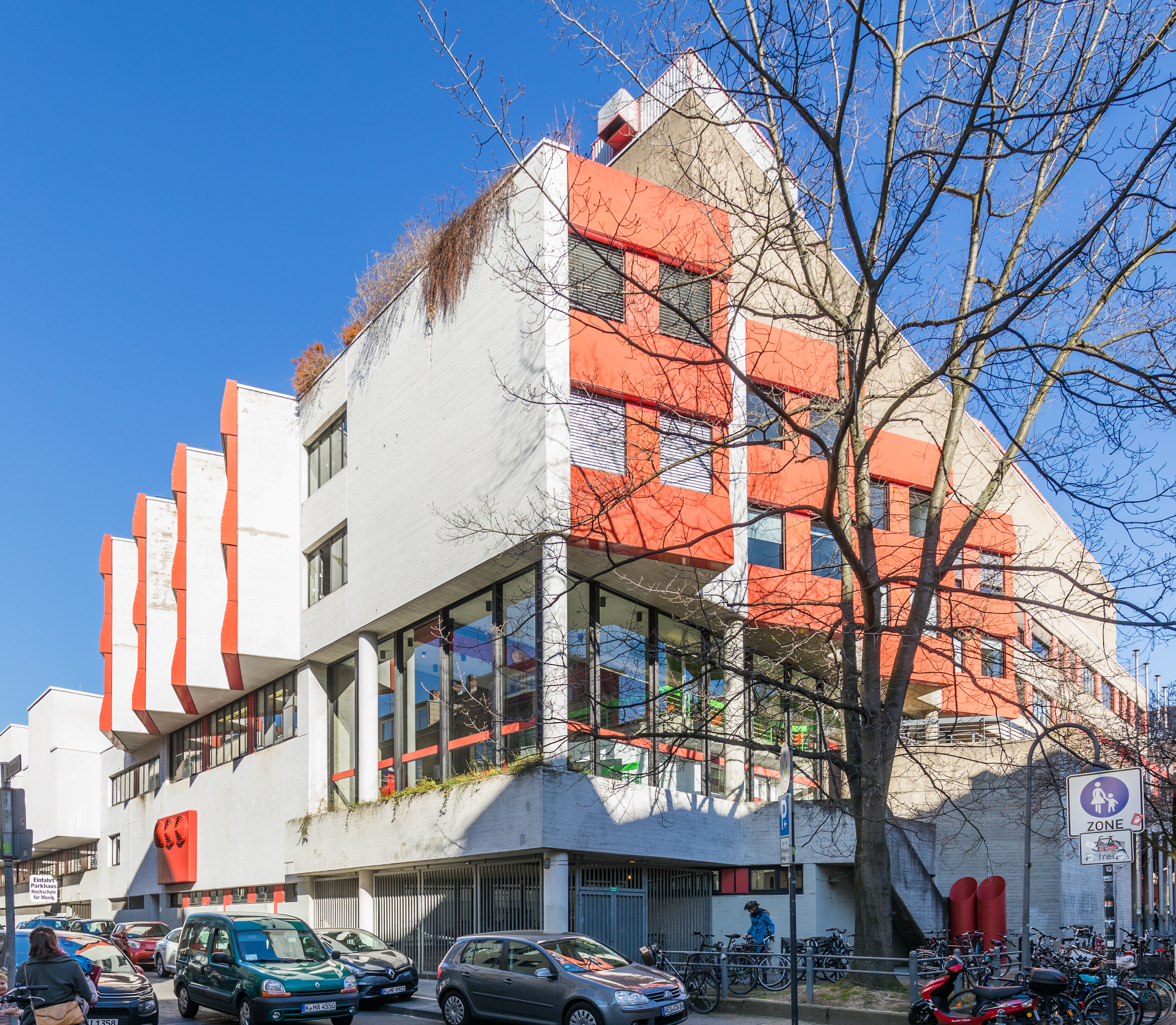
- School building
- Type: Public
- Established: 1850; 176 years ago
- Principal: Heinz Geuen
- Location: Cologne, Germany
- Campus: Urban
- Website: www.hfmt-koeln.de

The Cologne University of Music (German: Hochschule für Musik und Tanz Köln) is a public university of music and dance located in Cologne, North Rhine-Westphalia, Germany. Established in 1850 as the Conservatorium der Musik in Coeln, with around 1550 students, is one the largest music academies in Europe and it ranks among the world's leading institutions for artistic education.

== History ==
The academy was founded by Ferdinand Hiller in 1850 as Conservatorium der Musik in Coeln. In 1895 German violinist Willy Hess was appointed as principal professor of violin at the Conservatorium der Musik in Coeln.

In 1925 it became known as the Staatliche Hochschule für Musik having introduced new study and exam regulations.

In 1972 it incorporated previously independent conservatories in Aachen and Wuppertal, forming the Staatliche Hochschule für Musik Rheinland which in 1987 changed its name to Hochschule für Musik Köln or the Cologne University of Music.

In 1958, the hochschule began offering seminars in jazz, the rarity in the contemporary academic climate. The classes were taught by Kurt Edelhagen.

In November 1998, the university held a conference titled Frau Musica (nova). It focused on historical and living women composers. The conference consisted of both academic paper sessions and concerts, including a newly commissioned work by Pauline Oliveros.

== Campuses ==
The Hochschule für Musik und Tanz Köln operates three campuses in North Rhine-Westphalia, Germany. The main campus is located in Cologne (Köln), with additional campuses in Aachen and Wuppertal. Each campus offers a selection of the university's study programs and facilities tailored to local needs and specializations. The Cologne campus serves as the central administrative hub and hosts the majority of academic departments.

In 2023, construction began on a new campus of the Hochschule für Musik und Tanz Köln in the Kunibertsviertel district of Cologne. The project, managed by Bau- und Liegenschaftsbetrieb Nordrhein-Westfalen (BLB NRW), involves both the modernization of an existing former university building and the construction of a new extension. The new facilities will provide approximately 2,500 m² of additional space, including rehearsal and teaching rooms, a dance and concert hall, a library, and a café with a landscaped courtyard. The project emphasizes sustainability, featuring photovoltaic panels, energy-efficient systems, and a green roof. Completion is planned for 2026.

== Study ==
The Hochschule für Musik und Tanz Köln provides undergraduate and graduate degree programs in the fields of music and dance. Programs are structured in accordance with the Bologna Process and lead to Bachelor of Music (B.Mus.), Master of Music (M.Mus.), and Master of Arts (M.A.) degrees.

Bachelor’s programs are offered in subjects such as instrumental and vocal performance, orchestral instruments, composition, conducting, church music, music theory, jazz/pop, music education, and dance. Admission typically requires successful completion of an entrance examination that assesses artistic and technical proficiency.

Master’s programs include advanced study in disciplines such as solo performance, chamber music, orchestral playing, composition, conducting, music theory, music education, and dance studies. Some specialized programs are available in areas like early music and song accompaniment.

In addition to artistic and academic degree tracks, the university offers pedagogical programs designed for students aiming to teach music in schools or private settings. These combine music instruction with educational theory and practice.

The institution also maintains a Pre-College program for younger students preparing for professional music training. Doctoral studies are available in selected academic disciplines, particularly musicology and music education.

Courses are primarily taught in German. Certain graduate-level offerings may include components in English.

== Alumni ==
- Theo Altmeyer
- Jürg Baur
- Clarence Barlow
- Heribert Beissel
- Elena Braslavsky
- Jan Chiapusso
- Hayden Chisholm
- Michael Denhoff
- Allard de Ridder
- Sir Vivian Dunn
- Juan Carlos Echeverry Bernal
- Mojca Erdmann
- Henry Fairs
- Hedwig Fassbender
- Achim Fiedler
- Christopher Fifield
- Johannes Fritsch
- Mechthild Georg
- Reinhard Goebel
- Georg Hajdu
- Liselotte Hammes
- Anja Harteros
- York Höller
- Engelbert Humperdinck
- Hedy Iracema-Brügelmann
- Maria Jonas
- Johannes Kalitzke
- Volker David Kirchner
- Mayu Kishima
- Hans Knappertsbusch
- Akil Mark Koci
- Karlrobert Kreiten
- Carl Lachmund
- Jin Sang Lee
- Thomas Lehn
- Mesias Maiguashca
- Willem Mengelberg
- Tilman Michael
- Karl Aagard Østvig
- Luis Fernando Pérez
- Pauline Emmanuel Rosenthal
- Adolph Schellschmidt
- Olga Scheps
- Steffen Schleiermacher
- Else Schmitz-Gohr (composer)
- Michael Schneider (flautist)
- Johannes Schröder
- Wilhelm Schüchter
- Juan Maria Solare
- Caroline Stein
- Markus Stenz
- Karlheinz Stockhausen
- Markus Stockhausen
- Wolfgang Stockmeier
- Anna Torge
- Rosemarie Tüpker
- Zoran Dukic
- Chris Walden
- Graham Waterhouse
- Eberhard Werdin
- Soyoung Yoon
- Bernd Alois Zimmermann
- Goran Krivokapić
- Lili Wieruszowski
- Bruno Vlahek

== Lecturers ==
- Pierre-Laurent Aimard
- Michael Beil
- Cosmin Boeru
- Zakhar Bron
- Marcus Creed
- Zoran Dukic
- Liselotte Hammes
- York Höller
- Konrad Junghänel
- Klesie Kelly
- Maria Kliegel
- Vassily Lobanov
- Florence Millet
- Edda Moser
- Hans Neuhoff
- Jono Podmore
- Christoph Prégardien

== Former lecturers ==
- Hermann Abendroth
- András Adorján
- Amadeus Quartet
- Jürg Baur
- Erling Blöndal Bengtsson
- Walter Braunfels
- Kurt Edelhagen
- Herbert Eimert
- Maurits Frank
- Johannes Fritsch
- Clemens Ganz
- Vinko Globokar
- Hans Werner Henze
- Willy Hess (violinist)
- Philipp Jarnach
- Adolf Jensen
- Mauricio Kagel
- Aloys and Alfons Kontarsky
- Günter Ludwig
- Frank Martin
- Josef Metternich
- Krzysztof Meyer
- August von Othegraven
- Siegfried Palm
- Carl Reinecke
- Max Rostal
- Heinrich Schiff
- Hermann Schroeder
- Isidor Seiss
- Karlheinz Stockhausen
- Wolfgang Stockmeier
- Volker Wangenheim
- Erich Wenk
- Jiggs Whigham
- Franz Wüllner
- Bernd Alois Zimmermann

(List is mixed)

== See also ==
- Music schools in Germany
