= Sancta Susanna =

Opera by Paul Hindemith

- Opera by Paul Hindemith
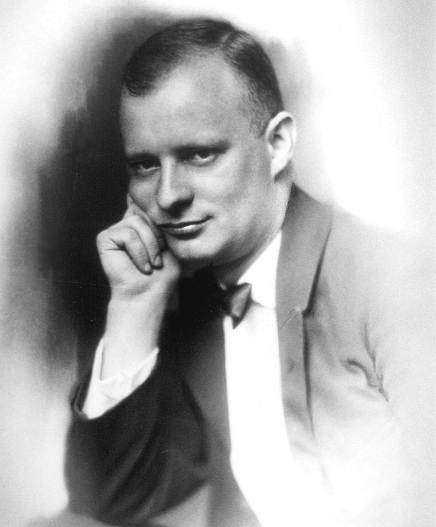
- The composer in 1923
- Librettist: August Stramm
- Language: German
- Premiere: 26 March 1922; Oper Frankfurt

Sancta Susanna is an early opera by Paul Hindemith in one act, with a German libretto by August Stramm. Composed over a two-week period in January and February 1921, its premiere was on 26 March 1922, at the Oper Frankfurt.

The work is his third and final in a triptych of expressionist-influenced one-act operas – the previous two being Mörder, Hoffnung der Frauen op. 12 (1921), and Das Nusch-Nuschi op. 20 (1921) – and much like the previous works, scandalised Frankfurt's concert-going public, affording the young composer heightened critical attention and notoriety.

== Background ==
Sancta Susanna examines the relationship between celibacy and lust in Christianity, depicting the descent of a nunnery into sexual frenzy. Hindemith around this time in his career has often been regarded as "a twenty-four-year-old dabbling in the realm of German expressionism", and although it cannot be described as a fully fledged work of expressionism, the opera undoubtedly shows a significant reflexivity on the composer's part to such contemporary artistic trends.

Much like his contemporaries, Hindemith spoke of the early twentieth century as a time in which "the old world exploded", and artists were forced to make sense of this changed world by disregarding to a large extent, codes and conventions that had been established – in some cases – for centuries. Thus, in the libretto (from the notable expressionist poet and playwright August Stramm), stage directions dominate over speech, which is highly fragmented through ellipses and incomplete phrases. Central to the opera is the expressionistic notion of shock as a means of articulating oneself, and musically, this was achieved to a large extent by pushing harmonic and tonal processes "to the very limits of tonality". Hindemith did not however, divorce himself entirely from formalism, and the work is structured in a series of variations.

== Synopsis ==
The opera opens in a convent at night, the protagonist, Susanna, lying in prayer in front of an altar. She is approached by a number of figures, the most prominent of whom is Sister Clementia, who states that Susanna is sick, and "scarcely live[s] on this earth any longer". The dialogue is underpinned by a high pedal in the organ, and in conjunction with conventionally extra-musical sounds such as that of belfry bells.

Susanna finds herself increasingly seduced and overpowered, initially by the sweet scents and sounds entering through the chapel window, but soon by the physical presence of her maid-servant, and her lover. Following a Latin invocation of Satan by Susanna, she is cautioned by Sister Clementia, with the tale of a nun, Sister Beata, who gave in to her erotic fantasies, and as a punishment was bricked up behind the altar. Susanna, no longer capable of abstaining, discards her veil, rips the loin cloth from the crucifix in front of her, and demands such punishment from the nuns, who have now congregated around her.

== Roles ==
- An old nun, contralto
- Klementia, contralto
- Susanna, soprano

== Critical reaction ==
The controversy generated by the opera upon its premiere is reflected in the difficulty Hindemith faced getting the work performed in the first place. Among his problems was finding a competent and willing conductor. Fritz Busch, who had premiered the composer's earlier operas, and who was seen as both progressive, and a champion of Hindemith's work, refused to offer his services on moral grounds. Upon its premiere, contemporary critic, Karl Grunsky wrote that the performance "signifies a desecration of our cultural institutions", and at a performance in Hamburg, concertgoers were required to pledge in writing not to cause a disturbance during the performance. Even as recently as 2024, performances of the work have attracted criticism from Christian organisations and adverse reactions from audiences. The 2024 performance was directed by Florentina Holzinger and includes "an actress with dwarfism dressed as the Pope being raised up into the air and spun around by a robotic arm, while another performs Eminem songs dressed as Jesus", "naked performers appearing as clappers in church bells, others scaling walls while wearing only harnesses, and a crucifix-shaped sword being thrust down an actress’s throat", and "a performer has a piece of their very real flesh cut off and fried on a stove".

At the same time as it has generated controversy, Sancta Susanna (and more generally Hindemith's operatic triptych) has been praised for its technical excellence. In 1930, Marion Scott wrote in Proceedings of the Musical Association that although the contents of his early operas are unquestionably "horrific", their "musical brilliance is equally certain, and "Sancta Susanna" is the cleverest of the bunch." The article describes him as "the acknowledged leader of the "new music"", and it is in no small part that his provocative early works contributed to such recognition.
