= Felix Decken =

German operatic buffo tenor, actor and stage director

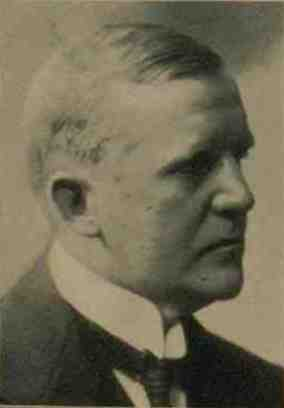
- Decken in 1912
- Born: 12 February 1864; Wesel, Rhine Province, Kingdom of Prussia
- Died: 10 February 1928 (aged 63); Stuttgart, Württemberg, Germany
- Occupations: Operatic tenor; Actor; Stage director
- Awards: Kammersänger

Felix Decken (12 February 1864 – 10 February 1928)) was a German operatic buffo tenor, actor and stage director.

== Career ==
Born in Wesel, Decken began his stage career in Rostock in 1892. He was a member of the opera in Elberfeld (now Wuppertal) from 1893 to 1896, then moved Hofbühne in Stuttgarter, where he made his debut as Beppo in Auber's Fra Diavolo. He was known for buffo parts, both for his singing as for acting with humour. His parts included Gomez in Kreutzer's Das Nachtlager in Granada, Georg in Lortzing's Der Waffenschmied and other parts in Lortzing operas, David in Wagner's Die Meistersinger von Nürnberg, Mime in his Der Ring des Nibelungen, and Eisenstein in Fledermaus by Johann Strauss.

In 1907 he was awarded the title of a royal Kammersänger. In 1912 he received the Gold Medal for Art and Science.

He remained in Stuttgart, working after World War I also as Spielleiter (stage director) until his death.

== Literature ==
- Ludwig Eisenberg: Felix Decken in Großes biographisches Lexikon der Deutschen Bühne im XIX. Jahrhundert. Paul List, Leipzig 1903, p. 179
- Genossenschaft Deutscher Bühnen-Angehöriger (ed.), Deutsches Bühnen-Jahrbuch 1929, Berlin, 1929, p 99
