= Hermann Wilhelm Weil =

American opera singer

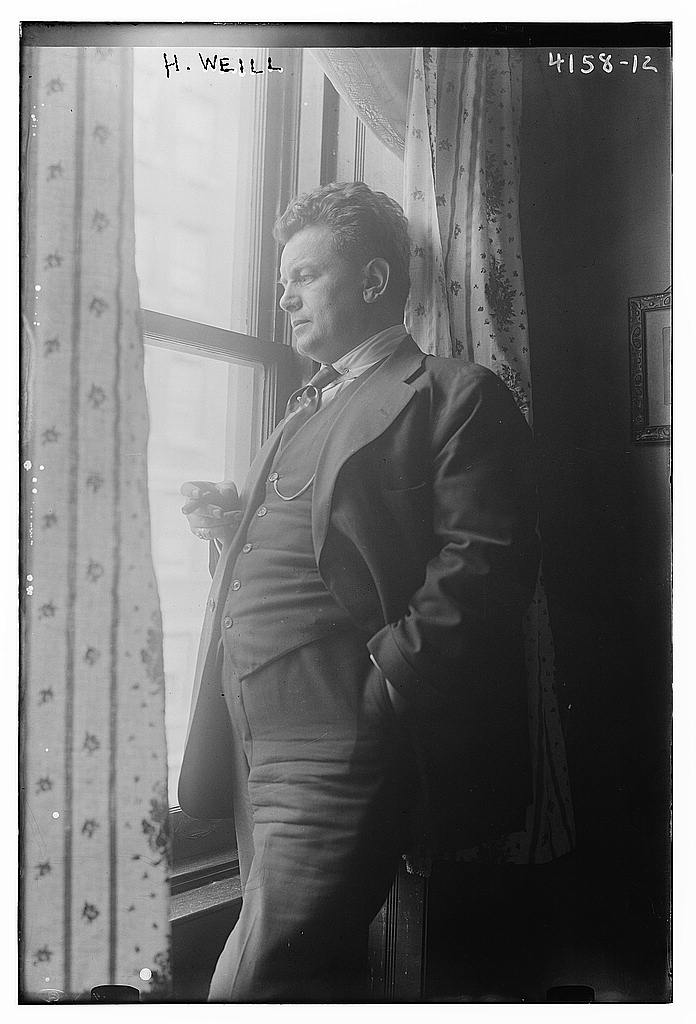
Weil looking out a window in 1917

Hermann Wilhelm Weil (1876 – July 6, 1949), was a baritone singer at the Metropolitan Opera.

== Biography ==
He was born in 1876. He sang with the Metropolitan Opera starting in 1911.

He drowned on July 6, 1949, in Blue Mountain Lake, New York after falling from an outboard motorboat.
