= Max von Schillings =

German conductor, composer and theatre director

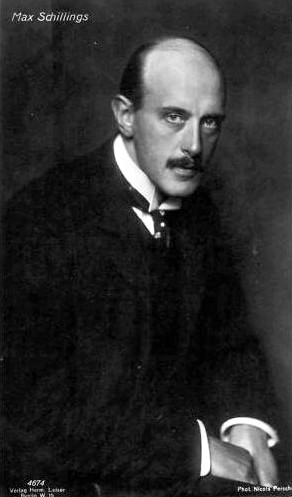
Max von Schillings

Max von Schillings (April 19, 1868 – July 24, 1933) was a German conductor, composer and theatre director. He was the chief conductor at the Berlin State Opera from 1919 to 1925.

Schillings' opera Mona Lisa (1915) was internationally successful and was performed at the Metropolitan Opera. The composer married Barbara Kemp, the soprano who sang the title role. Before Mona Lisa, Schillings had already written three operas: Ingwelde (1894), Der Pfeifertag (1899) and Der Moloch (1906).

== Biography ==
Born in Düren, Max von Schillings was brother to the photographer Carl Georg Schillings. He received his first musical training in violin, piano and theory at the same time as his formal education in Bonn. His teachers were Caspar Joseph Brambach and Otto von Königslow. Schillings later studied jurisprudence, philosophy, literature and art history at the Ludwig-Maximilians-Universität München. On October 1, 1892, he married his cousin Caroline Josefa Peill in Römlinghoven. They were divorced in 1923, and on June 11, 1923, he married the opera singer Barbara Kemp in Berlin-Charlottenburg.

Max Schillings was given a professorship by the Royal Bavarian Ministry of the Interior (Königliches Bayerisches Staatsministerium des Innern) on February 16, 1903. In October 1911, he was named an Honorary Doctor of Philosophy by the Philosophy Faculty at Heidelberg University. He was awarded the Ehrenkreuz (Ger. honorary cross), the fifth-highest rank awarded, by the Order of the Württemberg Crown, the highest order of chivalry in Württemberg. With this honor, he was allowed to use the name Max von Schillings. In Düren, the street between Goethestraße and Aachener Straße was renamed "Schillingsstraße".

As early as the 1890s, he was given a position as an assistant at the Bayreuth Festival; later he was engaged as a conductor and music teacher in Munich. Between 1908 and 1918, he was the Intendant at the Königlichen Hoftheater (Royal Court Theatre) in Stuttgart, for which he received the honor mentioned above. From 1918 to 1925, he succeeded Richard Strauss as intendant of the State Opera in Berlin, whilst concurrently being the musical director of the summer-time Zoppot Forest Opera. In the second half of this decade, he undertook concert tours which took him through Europe and to the USA.

Having returned to Germany, he took over the job of President of the Prussian Academy of the Arts in 1932, succeeding Max Liebermann. From March 1933 until his death, Schillings was also the artistic director of the Städtische Oper Berlin. He died in 1933 from a pulmonary embolism in Berlin. His ashes were entombed at Frankfurt-am-Main.

His composition work includes several operas, melodramas, choral works, chamber music pieces, violin and piano concertos, symphonic poems and works for stage (see list below). His most important work is undoubtedly his opera Mona Lisa (first performed on September 26, 1915, in Stuttgart), which became one of the most-performed operas in Germany until his death. He stands beside Engelbert Humperdinck and Richard Strauss as one of the composers who re-established the music form of melodrama at the start of the 20th century. Schillings was renowned as a music educator – one of his more famous students was Wilhelm Furtwängler. He was the dedicatee of "Sea Drift" by Frederick Delius.

Schillings was an opponent of the Weimar Republic and a declared anti-Semite. The expulsion and exclusion of important Jewish and free-thinking artists from the Prussian Academy of the Arts began during his time as the Academy's President – among the many artists affected were Käthe Kollwitz, Heinrich Mann, Ricarda Huch, Alfred Döblin, Thomas Mann, Max Liebermann, Alfons Paquet, Franz Werfel and Jakob Wassermann. He laid off Arnold Schoenberg from the teaching staff of the Academy, in contravention of Schoenberg's contract and in 1933, he ordered Franz Schreker, the leader of masterclasses in composition at the Academy, into early retirement.

== Selected works ==
=== Operas ===
- Ingwelde
- Der Pfeifertag
- Moloch op. 20
- Mona Lisa (1913/15, libretto by Beatrice von Dovsky)

=== Melodramas ===
- Das Hexenlied, op. 15
- Kassandra
- Das Eleusische Fest

=== Concertos ===
- Violin Concerto in A minor, op. 25

=== Chamber music ===
- String quartet in E minor
- String quintet, op. 32

=== Miscellaneous ===
- Glockenlieder ("Bell Songs"), op. 22
- Meergruß und Seemorgen (Sea Greeting and Lake Morning), op. 6
- Vier liederen aus der Wanderzeit ("Four Songs from the Wandering Time"), op.2

== Literature ==
- Gedenkschrift Prof. Dr. phil. h.c. Max von Schillings, Komponist und Dirigent, Zum 100. Geburtstag 19. April 1968, J. Geuenich + K. Strahn, Düren 1968
- Max von Schillings, Der Kampf eines deutschen Künstlers (Max von Schillings, The struggles of a German artist), Wilhelm Raup, Hanseatische Verlaganstalt Hamburg, 1935.
- Max von Schillings. August Richard, Drei-Masken-Verlag München, 1922
- Max von Schillings, Gesamtverzeichnis seiner Werke (Max von Schillings, A Summary of his Works), Joachim Beck

== Documents ==
Letters by Max von Schillings held by the State Archives in Leipzig, company archives of the Music Publishing House C.F.Peters (Leipzig).
