= Devrient =

Devrient is a surname. It may refer to:

Family of actors

- Ludwig Devrient (1784–1832), uncle to Karl August, Eduard, Emil
- Karl August Devrient (1797–1872), nephew of Ludwig, brother of Eduard and Emil, married to Wilhelmine
- Eduard Devrient (1801–1877), nephew of Ludwig, brother of Karl August and Emil, father of Otto
- Emil Devrient (1803–1872), nephew of Ludwig, brother of Karl August and Eduard
- Doris Devrient (1801–1882), Emil's wife from 1825 to 1842
- Wilhelmine Schröder-Devrient (1804–1860), opera singer, married to Karl August
- Otto Devrient (1838–1894), son of Eduard, nephew of Karl August and Emil

Others

- Raymond Devrient (1904–1987), Swiss business executive

== See also ==
- Giesecke+Devrient, German printing firm specialising in bank notes
