= Max Staegemann =

German actor and theatre director

Max Staegemann (10 May 1843 – 29 January 1905) was a German actor, operatic baritone and theatre director.

== Life ==
=== Actor and singer ===
Born in Bad Freienwalde in the Prussian Province of Brandenburg, Staegemann came from the Berlin merchant family Staegemann. His mother was Mathilde Leontine née Devrient (28 June 1809 in Berlin – 25 October 1884 in Leipzig), the sister of the actors Karl, Emil and Eduard Devrient, who was famous for her beauty.

Staegemann attended the Kreuzschule in Dresden, where the family had moved. Especially his uncle Emil encouraged the acting talent of his nephew, who was supposed to attend university according to his father's wish. Staegemann chose instead to attend the Dresdner Konservatorium, where the actor Heine gave him lessons in dramatic performance. As early as 1862, the talented eleve received an engagement at the Bremer Stadttheater. There, Staegemann perfected his acting techniques under director Heinrich Behr. At the same time, he trained his singing voice, a naturally melodious, powerful baritone.

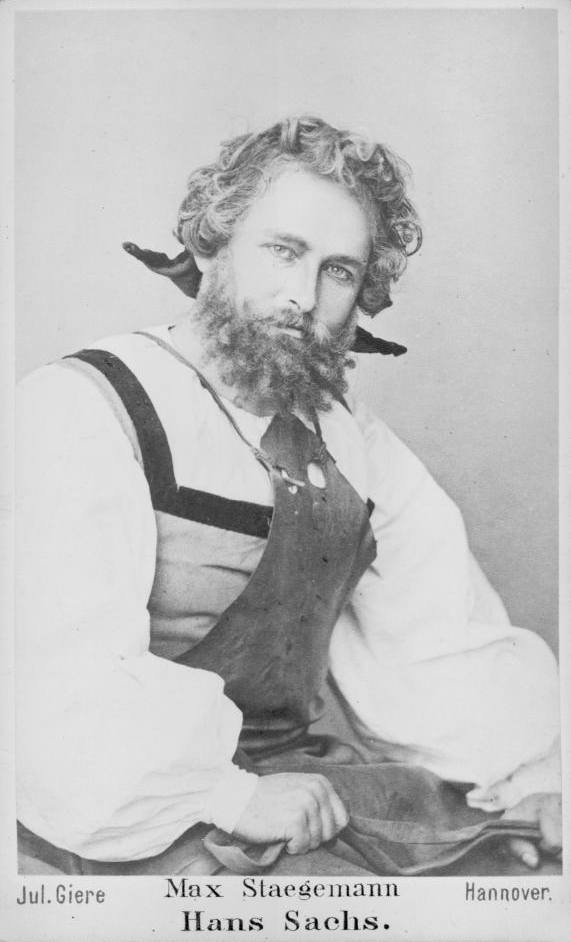
Staegemann as Hans Sachs in den Meistersingern, photograph by Julius Giere

In May 1863 he celebrated his debut as singer at the Staatsoper Hannover under Kapellmeister Carl Ludwig Fischer, who had engaged him as a second baritone. In 1864 he took further singing lessons with François Delsarte in Paris and later with the Swedish singer Oscar Lindhudt in Hanover.

After the departure of the first baritone Ludwig Zottmayr, Staegemann took his place in 1865. „The artist quickly won the sympathy of the theatre audience with his sympathetic, sonorous voice, his lively performance, as well as his witty, deeply thought-out acting." Staegemann belonged to the Hanover stage for twelve years and during this time developed into one of the first singers in his field. He was particularly in demand as an interpreter of Marschner and Wagner. Numerous invitations to guest appearances have taken him to all the major German opera houses. He enjoyed particular success in the title role of the opera Hans Heiling, as Lord Ruthwen in the opera der Vampyr, as Guilbert in The Templar and the Jewess, as Hans Sachs in Die Meistersinger von Nürnberg and as the title character in the operas Der Fliegende Holländer and William Tell. His star role as a singer, however, was that of Don Giovanni in Mozart's eponymous opera „eine wahre Meisterleistung in Gesang und Spiel."

=== Intendant ===
In 1876, Staegemann moved to Königsberg, where he took over the directorship of the Stadttheater, which experienced an unimagined upswing under his leadership in a very short time. There he became a member of the Königsberg masonic lodge Immanuel. The productions of Heinrich Hoffmann's Armin and The Taming of the Shrew by Hermann Goetz caused a great stir. Under Staegemann's direction and with conductor Emil Paur, the German premiere of Carmen by Georges Bizet took place on 26 October 1879. He himself sang the role of Escamillo. Louis Köhler and Alexander Wyneken wrote glowing reviews, which initiated the worldwide triumph of the opera, which had failed in Paris.

From 1879, Staegemann lived in Berlin, where he worked as a concert singer and voice teacher.

In 1882, Staegemann, who had been appointed Kingly Prussian Kammersänger, was offered the position of Generalintendant to take over the lease of the Städtische Bühnen in Leipzig. Since 1868, these had consisted of two theatres, the Altes Theater, which was mainly used as a stage for plays, and the Neues Theater, which functioned as an opera house. Staegemann began with bold artistic élan that helped both theatres achieve great success. He hired excellent actors such as Clara Salbach and Fanny Moran-Olden and worked with excellent directors for opera and drama.

In May 1883, he staged a spectacular production of Goethe's entire Faust, adapted by Otto Devrient. His Goethe cycle in the same year and the ten-evening Wagner cycle in 1887 were very well received. He engaged the young Gustav Mahler and stuck with him, despite the latter's rivalries with his first Kapellmeister Arthur Nikisch.

In 1903, Eisenberg judged Staegemann's work in Leipzig: "He has succeeded in assigning this theatre a very first place among the art institutes of Germany. His successes as a director are well known in the stage world, and his productions are among the best that modern directing is capable of. St. is generally regarded as one of the most outstanding stage managers in Germany."

However, the old leasehold system which prevailed in Leipzig at the time, as elsewhere, and which gave the theatre manager complete economic responsibility in addition to artistic responsibility, put Staegemann under increasing pressure. In order to keep the financial risk as low as possible, he pursued a repertoire policy fixated on the classical repertoire and rejected performances of contemporary literature on principle. He used the stage of the Carolatheater, which he leased from 1887, purely as a vaudeville theatre. When he had to give up this theatre in 1899 at the behest of the city councillors to concentrate his energies on the municipal stages, the theatre, now renamed the Leipziger Schauspielhaus, opened up to modern drama under the directorship of Anton Hartmann and developed into a competitor for Staegemann's audience favour.

Under the direction of Staegemann, excellent productions were staged at the Leipzig Opera, most of which were conducted by Arthur Nikisch. Particular highlights were the performances of the complete Ring, the Tannhäuser and Die Walküre.

In his twenty years as director, Staegmann did much to establish Leipzig's reputation as an important metropolis of musical culture in Europe.

Staegemann was married to violinist Hildegard Kirchner (d. 16 June 1913 in Dresden), a pupil of Ferdinand Laub. Their six children include the actor and baritone Waldemar Staegemann, the soprano Helene Staegemann (1877–1923), who had been married to the composer Count Botho Sigwart zu Eulenburg since 1909, and the colouratura soprano Erna Staegemann. His brother was the actor Eugen Staegemann and his cousin Julie Meister.

Among his pupils was Wilhelm Cronberger.

Staegemann died in Leipzig at the age of 61. His grave is located at the Trinitatisfriedhof in Dresden-Johannstadt.

== Critics ==
Stägemann's appearance, the fine head with the noble features, surrounded by raven-black hair, the nature of his voice particularly enable him to represent demonic figures. Hans Heiling, Vampyr and Der fliegende Holländer are, in our opinion, therefore his brilliant performances. The voice is full-toned and big, but not in the breadth that it needs to shy away from rivalry. Much more mediocre baritones could compete with him in this. But the organ is extraordinarily capable of modulation, and its owner can easily make use of it in all ways. The fine tact with which Stägemann knows how to use this timbre here, that timbre there, how he structures every little sentence and how he increases the means with all clarity according to the sense of the person to be presented, according to the situation, in harmony with the gesture and the posture, which everywhere betray an actor of the first rank, The planned nature of the whole composition, as well as the execution of the smallest parts, makes him a great artist, which he will be even more certain of as soon as, with Leipzig at the age of the passing of the years, a youthful haste, which now and then appears to be quiet, has disappeared from his performance and appearance.

— Musical Weekly of 19 August 1870
