= Christine Genast =

German actress, singer and pianist (1798–1860)

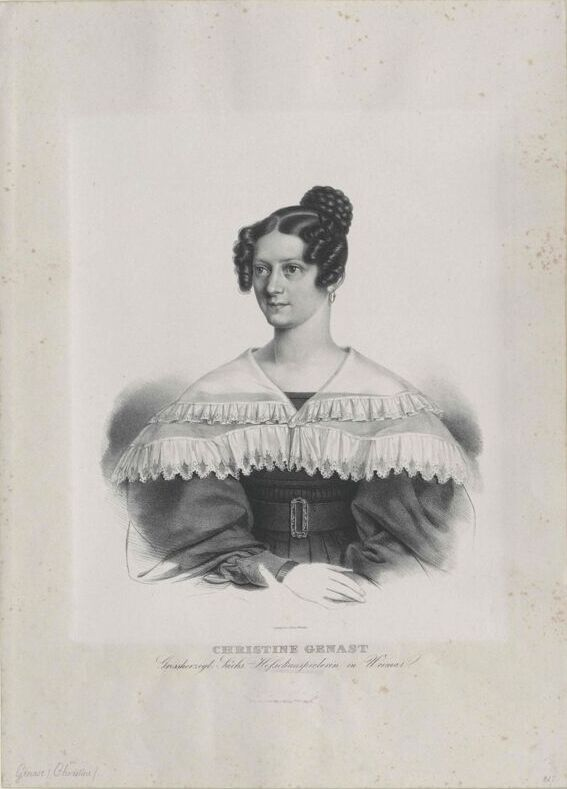
- Born: Karoline Christine Böhler; 31 January 1798; Cassel, Hesse-Cassel, Holy Roman Empire
- Died: 15 April 1860 (aged 62); Weimar, Thuringia, German Confederation
- Other name: Christine Böhler
- Occupations: Actress, singer, pianist
- Years active: 1814–1860
- Spouse: Eduard Genast (m. 1820)
- Children: 5
- Relatives: Doris Devrient (sister)

Karoline Christine Genast (née Böhler; 31 January 1798 – 15 April 1860) was a German actress, singer and pianist.

== Early life ==
Karoline Christine Böhler was born on 31 January 1798 (Note: According to Ludwig Eisenberg, other sources conflict on birth year.) in Cassel as the eldest daughter of Wilhelm Böhler, a lawyer from Mannheim. Her father was persuaded to act by actor August Wilhelm Iffland and then gained a reputation in Frankfurt am Main for comic and character roles. Her father personally educated Böhler and her younger sister, Doris, himself.

She made her stage debut on 2 May 1814 as in Lilla in the opera of the same name in Frankfurt. The next year she made her debut as a pianist also in Frankfurt.

== Career ==
The early death of her father in 1816 prompted Böhler to accept an engagement at the Estates Theatre in Prague, where she was praised for her "naturalness, charm and youthful freshness". Along with her younger sister Doris, they came to the Stadttheater in Leipzig, which was then under the direction of Karl Theodor von Küstner. During this time, she was known as the "great Böhler", while her sister was known as the "little Böhler". While there, she met fellow newcomer Eduard Genast and married him on 14 May 1820. Together they had 5 children; four daughters and a son.

She was known in her prime for being one of the best representatives of Friedrich Schiller and William Shakespeare's heroines.

Johann Wolfgang von Goethe was a fan of her work and dedicated a poem to her while he was still in Leipzig on 31 January 1822. This poem was also written in von Küstner's Review. On 24 April 1830, with Wilhelmine Schröder-Devrient, she sang "Erlkönig" by Schubert set by Goethe's poem of the same name in front of Goethe himself, who remarked "I have this composition once before, when it did not appeal to me at all; but sung in this way, the whole shapes itself into a visible picture".

After Küstner's theatre failed, her husband, Eduard, built a theatre in Magdeburg from the ruins of that company in 1828 with support from the Frederick William III of Prussia. He also brought in actors from Küstner's company including her sister and her husband Emil Devrient. One year later, the couple was offered a lifelong engagement at the Weimar Court Theatre as well as the opportunity to manage a newly built court theatre in Leipzig. They opted for the former as it had been run by her father-in-law Anton Genast and Goethe.

== Later life and death ==
As she grew older, Genast moved away from playing youthful heroines and focused on portraying mothers in drama. She found success in this type of role as well as in older classical plays such as Isabella in The Bride of Messina and Volumnia in Coriolanus.

One of her last consequential roles was Claudia Galotti in Emilia Galotti on 15 September 1859. Her last role was the main part in Rosa und Röschen on 16 January 1860, where she bade goodbye to the audience. Genast died that same year on 15 April 1860, in Weimar.
