= Hans Stieber =

German conductor, composer and violinist

Hans Albert Oskar Stieber (1 March 1886 – 18 October 1969) was a German conductor, composer and violinist. He was the founding director of the Hochschule für Theater und Musik in Halle an der Saale.

== Life ==
=== Origin and family ===
Stieber was born in Naumburg an der Saale in the Prussian Province of Saxony as the eldest of four sons of the lawyer Paul Stieber (1856–1944) and his wife Elsbeth (Else) (1861–1940), née Biermann. His maternal great-grandmother Friederike Komitsch, née Schaffner, was an actress at the Schauspielhaus Berlin and married the actor Ludwig Devrient in her first marriage. His grandfather was the jurist Wilhelm Stieber and worked as a police director, privy councillor and head of the Central-Nachrichten-Bureaus at the Preußisches Staatsministerium in Berlin. His father made it to the 1st director of the Norddeutsche miners association's pension fund in Halle an der Saale. He also made a name for himself as the founder of a sanatorium. He too was the business manager of the Luther Festival and organised the mountain concerts in Halle. Stieber's brother Paul Devrient (1890–1973) was an opera and concert singer (tenor), especially a sought-after Mozart and Verdi-interpreter.

He was of Lutheran confession and in 1920 married to Gretel Elisabeth, née Runge, who came from East Frisia.

=== School years and music studies ===
Stieber attended the Stadtgymnasium Halle. As a pupil he was enthusiastic about puppetry, and at the same time he received piano lessons from his father who was interested in music.

His musical interest culminated in 1904 in the recording of a study of music at the University of Music and Theatre Leipzig. He studied violin with the former concertmaster of the Gewandhausorchester Arno Hilf and conducting with the Gewandhaus Kapellmeister Arthur Nikisch, Stephan Krehl (music theory) and Heinrich Zöllner (musical composition). From 1906 to 1908 he continued his studies probably for health reasons at the Princely Conservatory Sondershausen in Schwarzburg-Sondershausen. There he was decisively supported by Carl Corbach, the director of the institute. In 1909 he passed his examinations in public. He played the viola in Dvořák's 14th string quartet, conducted an aria from Mendelssohn's oratorium Elija and participated as soloist in the Violin Concerto in E minor of the composer.

=== Stages as conductor ===
From 1908 he was first violinist in the Loh-Orchester Sondershausen. In 1910 he became 2nd violinist of the Anhaltische Philharmonie in Anhalt. After one year, he also became assistant to the court kapellmeister Franz Mikorey and worked until 1915 as répétiteur and choir director at the court theatre. In the summer months he was a violinist at the Kurorchester Bad Kissingen (Bavaria) and Bad Elster (Saxony).

Afterwards, he worked at various German houses: He was opera conductor and concert conductor at the Theater Koblenz (1916) and at the Munich Chamber Opera (1917). At the Opernhaus Kiel, where he worked from 1917 to 1920, he was responsible for the new production of Cherubini's opera Der Wasserträger with recitatives composed by himself. In 1920 he became symphony concert conductor of the Staatskapelle Halle orchestra. He opened the dress rehearsals of the orchestra for the free attendance of school classes.

The premiere of his first opera Der Sonnenstürmer in Chemnitz in 1921 was a great success. His brother also sang in this opera. In the 1920s and 1930s he composed numerous stage and choral works which were premiered in Hanover, Essen, Bremen, Vienna, Leipzig and Breslau. In 1928, the Gewandhaus Quartet premiered his string quartet in F Major.

From 1922 he worked as a freelancer in Hanover for 15 years: Until 1938 he led the Hannoverschen Männer-Gesangs-Verein. 1923 he made his debut in the cupola hall of the Hannover Congress Centrum. As a concert conductor he interpreted a.o. Liszts' Faust Symphony, Bruckner's Symphony No. 5 and Mahler's Symphony No. 2 ("Resurrection Symphony"). In 1924 In 1924 with the Männerchor and the Hannoversche Konzertchor founded by him, the later Singakademie, he performed Pfitzner's romantic cantata Von deutscher Seele to the Hanover premiere.

=== Activity at the Leipzig Opera House ===
In 1938, Stieber got a position as dramaturge, musical advisor and conductor at the Leipzig Opera. He was also responsible for the composition of stage and acting music, such as Gutenberg in Mainz, Der Schauspieldirektor, Der Mumanz and Madame Devrient. Stieber became further successor of Gustav Wohlgemuth in the Leipziger Männerchor. 1941 he reorganized the Leipziger Singakademie and became its music director.

During his Leipzig years he also composed symphonic works and cantatas, which were performed under the direction of Hermann Abendroth and Paul Schmitz at the Gewandhaus. The world premiere of his opera Der Dombaumeister took place in 1942 at the Wrocław Opera.

Stieber was not a party member. He belonged to the circle of friends of the Leipzig mayor and resistance fighter Carl Friedrich Goerdeler. He saw himself as a late Romantic. According to Gert Richter (1986), "bourgeois Christian-humanistic traditions" shaped his activity. Stieber's works are "supported by high moral norms". He "did not allow himself to be corrupted by the National Socialist idea or to be pressured into his ethos". In Nazi Germany, Stieber set jubilant National Socialist texts to music.

=== Founding director of the Musikhochschule Halle ===
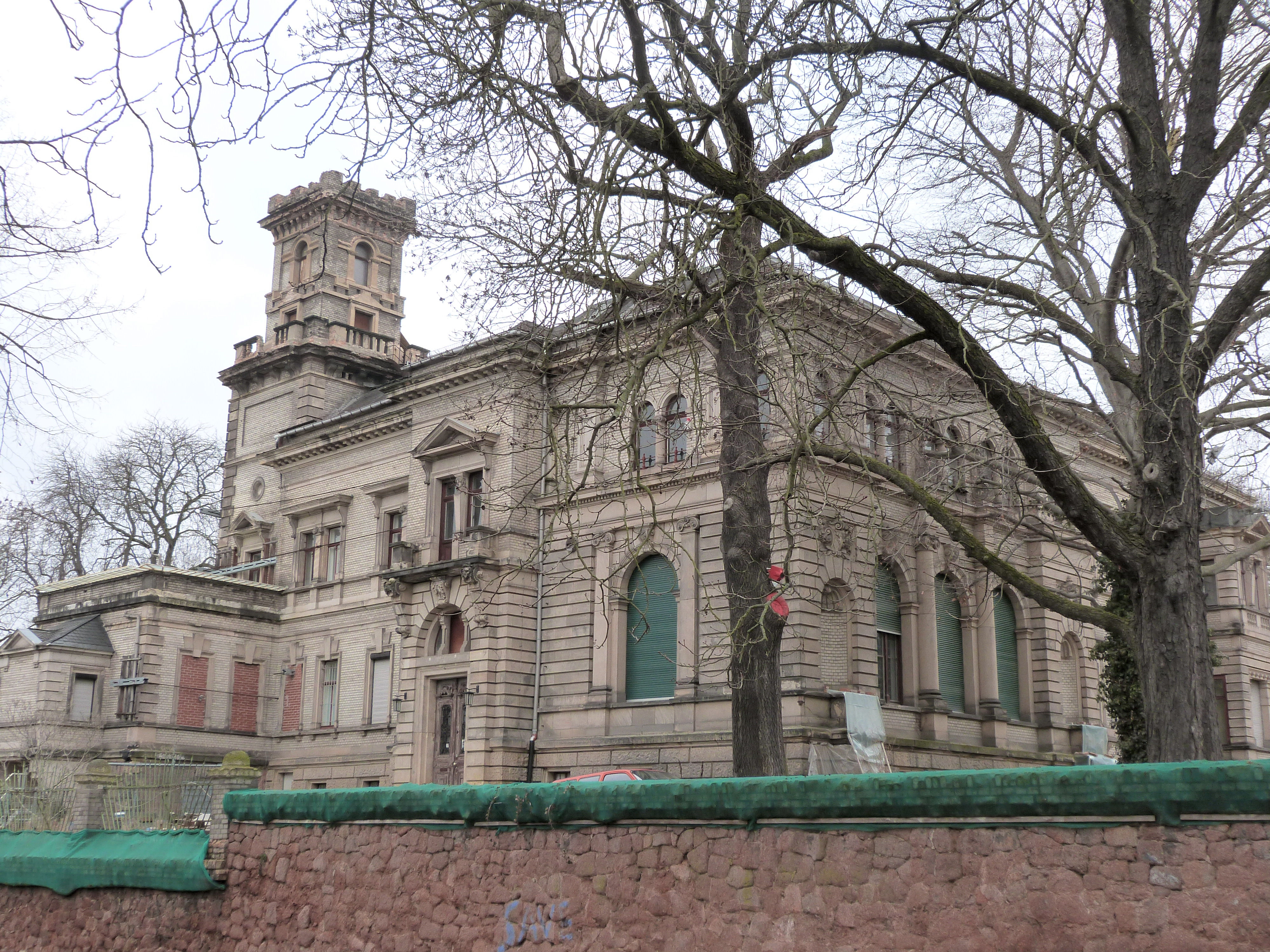
Former State University for Theatre and Music in Halle (2017)

In June 1946, commissioned by the Soviet Military Administration in Germany, gründete er 1947 among others together with Max Schneider, Walther Davisson, Bronisław von Poźniak and Sigfrid Grundeis the Hochschule für Theater und Musik in Halle, which he headed until 1938. From 1948 to 1955 he was professor and director of the master classes for musical composition, conducting and opera dramaturgy. After the transformation of the school into a music institute in 1955, he became emeritus, but continued to work at the institute as a member of the senate and head of department for composition and theory. His students included among others Fritz Ihlau and Manfred Weiss. In addition he rebuilt the Singakademie in Halle as musical director from 1948 to 1953.

Guest conductors have taken him to Prague, Frankfurt am Main, Lübeck, Hanover and Leipzig. He rejected an invitation to the 1951 Music Olympiad in Salzburg. In 1952 he took part in the 1st International Music Congress as a guest of the Gesellschaft der Musikfreunde in Vienna. He became a juror at the Society's soloist competition. The Niederrheinische Chormusikfest in Mönchen-Gladbach appointed him to its honorary committee. Stieber was also a member of the Richard-Strauss-Gesellschaft and the Gesellschaft für Musikforschung. On behalf of the Leipzig Musikhochschule he carried out music-dramaturgical research on contemporary opera works. He was also active in the Commission for Music Theatre in the Association of Composers and Musicologists of the GDR, for which he also prepared expert opinions. Stieber was an honorary member of the International Association of Wagner Societies and the Hannoverschen Männer-Gesangs-Vereins.

He was also a fruitful composer. He dedicated his Zwiegespräch for violin and viola (1965) to the Soviet violin virtuoso David Oistrakh, who received the score personally during a concert in Halle. He composed his Violin Concerto in D Major for Saschko Gawriloff. He also dealt musically with the works of the sculptor Ernst Barlach. So he became a member of the Ernst Barlach Gesellschaft Hamburg and of the Barlach-Arbeitskreis of the Cultural Association of the GDR.

Stieber died in 1969 of pneumonia in Halle at the age of 83.

== Work ==
Stieber's works are stored in the Stieber Archive of the Stadtbibliothek Hannover and as partially indexed Nachlass (edited by Gert Richter) in the library of the foundation Handel House of the city of Halle.

To his body of compositions belong music-dramaturgical works such as operas, chamber operas und Singspiele, vocal music, including choral music, as well as orchestral and instrumental chamber music pieces. He was also the author of several stage plays.

== Prizes ==
- 1961: Art Prize of the City of Halle (on the occasion of his 1000-year anniversary).
- 1965: Handel Prize presented by the city of Halle.

== Hans Stieber Prize ==
Within the framework of the Hallische Musiktage, the "Hans Stieber Prize" was awarded posthumously from 1977 onwards at the suggestion of the Association of Composers and Musicologists of the GDR.
