= Friedrich Haase =

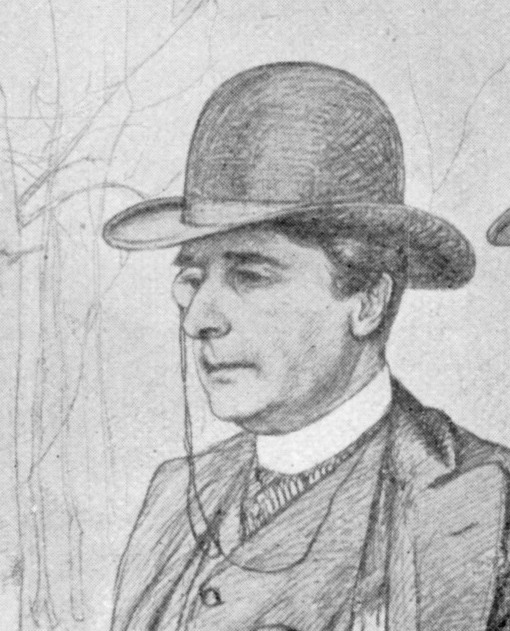
Friedrich Haase (1887, drawn by C.W.Allers)

Friedrich Haase (1 November 1827 – 17 March 1911) was a prominent German actor and theatre director. He was born in Berlin, the son of a valet to King Frederick William IV, who was his godfather.

== Career ==
Haase trained under Ludwig Tieck and made his first appearance in 1846 in Weimar. He later performed in Prague (1849–1851), under Eduard Devrient in Karlsruhe (1852–1855), and Saint Petersburg (1860–1866). He also toured the United States.

He was manager of the court theatre in Coburg, and was manager of the Stadttheater in Leipzig (today Oper Leipzig), from 1870 to 1876. After returning to Berlin, Haase founded the Deutsches Theater. He was awarded the prestigious Iffland-Ring in 1878 by Theodor Döring and much the legend of the ring's origin goes back to Haase.

Haase retired from the stage in 1898. The street Haase Straße in Berlin-Friedrichshain is named after him.

== Works ==
- Was ich erlebte 1846–1896. Berlin: Bong 1897 (autobiography)

== Literature ==
- Paul von Ebart: Friedrich Haase als Leiter des Koburg-Gothaischen Hoftheaters. Including excerpts from Haase's letters. In: Deutsche Revue 1912, March
