= Paul Devrient =

German tenor and actor

Paul Devrient, real name Walter Stieber, also Paul Stieber-Walter (17 November 1890 – 5 November 1973) was a German operatic tenor and theatre director. He was considered a renowned Verdi and Mozart interpreter. He also gained notoriety as Adolf Hitler's voice coach and speech teacher in 1932.

== Life ==
Stieber was born in Wandsbek near Hamburg one of four sons of the lawyer Paul Stieber (1856-1944) and his wife Elsbeth (Else) (1861-1940), née Biermann. His elder brother Hans Stieber (1886-1969) became a conductor, composer and violinist. Stieber attended grammar school in Halle an der Saale, where his father last worked as 1st director of the North German Knappschafts pension fund. His great-grandmother was the Berlin court actress Friederike Komitsch, née Schaffner, who was married in her first marriage to the famous actor Ludwig Devrient. His grandfather Wilhelm Stieber, a lawyer and criminologist, served as head of the Central-Nachrichten-Bureaus at the Preußisches Staatsministerium in Berlin.

He studied at the universities of Leipzig and Berlin. During his studies, he became a member of the Leipziger Universitäts-Sängerschaft zu St. Pauli in Mainz in 1909. He also took singing lessons from 1912 to 1915 with the tenor Hanns Nietan in Dessau and in 1918 with the US baritone Harry de Garmo in Wiesbaden.

Under the names Paul Stieber-Walter and Paul Devrient, he was an opera singer at the Staatstheater Mainz from 1915 to 1918, then at the Theater Chemnitz (1918–1921). In 1921, he was involved in the premiere of his brother's opera Der Sonnenstürmer in Chemnitz. In 1921/22, he moved to the Landestheater Darmstadt. From 1922 to 1929, he was an opera singer at the Staatsoper Hannover. There, he premiered the opera Herr Dürers Bild by Joseph Gustav Morczek in 1927. He also had a guest performance contract at the Preußische Staatsoper Berlin from 1924 to 1928. Further guest appearances took him to the Cologne Opera in 1925 and to the Dresden State Opera in 1927.

After 1929, he devoted himself increasingly to operetta at the Theater des Westens and at the Metropol-Theater in Berlin. From 1936 to 1939, he was a singer and director at the Stadttheater Frankfurt (Oder). He was engaged in the same capacity at the theatres in Liegnitz (1939-1941) and Görlitz (1941/42). He also appeared as a concert and oratorio singer as well as a Lieder interpreter, often accompanied by his brother on the piano. He took part in the Sopot International Song Festival in 1934.

His repertoire included Belmonte from Die Entführung aus dem Serail (Mozart), Nureddin from Der Barbier von Bagdad (Cornelius), Fritz from Der ferne Klang (Schreker), Alviano from Die Gezeichneten (Schreker), Mephisto from Doktor Faust (Busoni), Duke from Rigoletto (Verdi), Alfredo from La Traviata and Klas from Enoch Arden (Gerster). Records published by Odeon Records.

Stieber, a Protestant, was married to Marta Geigenberger and father of two children. From 1943 he lived in Marktl am Inn.

Under the name Paul Stieber-Walter, records were released by Odeon (Berlin 1924-27) and Parlophon (tenor solo in complete 9th Symphony by Beethoven under Frieder Weißmann; Berlin 1925).

== Devrient as Hitler's voice coach ==
According to Devrient's diary, published posthumously in 1975, he was supposed to provide relief after Hitler was diagnosed with impending vocal cord paralysis due to overexertion. For a fee, Devrient accompanied Hitler on his propaganda trips across Germany from April to November 1932. Devrient not only trained Hitler's voice and speaking technique, but also improved his presence as a political speaker in front of large audiences through acting and rhetoric lessons. In order not to undermine Hitler's credibility or even expose him publicly to the ridicule of his opponents, Devrient had to work under the utmost secrecy. Details only became known after his death, when his diary passed into the hands of his son Hans Stieber (born 1917). He left the records to Werner Maser, who finally published them in 1975.

Jens Dobler suspects that this diary and the entire Devrient-Hitler legend could be an invention by Hans Stieber, whom he also believes to be the presumed author of the forged memoirs of his great-grandfather Wilhelm Stieber published in 1978.

Devrient's cooperation with Hitler provided material for several stage plays and films. A first parody was delivered by Bertolt Brecht with the stage play The Resistible Rise of Arturo Ui (1941). George Tabori made the instructor into a man in the farce Mein Kampf (1987), he turned the instructor into a Jew who becomes his pupil's first victim. In the cinema comedy My Führer – The Really Truest Truth about Adolf Hitler (2006), director and writer Dani Levy has the German dictator taught by a Jewish concentration camp prisoner.

Devrient died in Ruhpolding at the age of 82.

== Filmography ==
- 1956: The Old Forester House
- 1959: Land, das meine Sprache spricht
- 1960: Schatten der Helden
- 1960/61: Hamlet
- 1963: Lady Lobsters Bräutigam
- 1963/64: Die Gardine
- 1964: Die Verbrecher
- 1966: Face of a Hero
- 1968/69: Der Fall Lena Christ

== Diary ==
- Werner Maser (coll./ed.): Mein Schüler Hitler. Das Tagebuch seines Lehrers Paul Devrient. Ilmgau Verlag, Pfaffenhofen 1975, ISBN 3-7787-1022-2.
- Werner Maser (ed.): Paul Devrient. Mein Schüler Adolf Hitler. Das Tagebuch seines Lehrers. Universitas, München 2003, ISBN 3-8004-1450-3.
