= Fritz Ihlau =

German composer

Fritz Ihlau (28 August 1909 – 1995) was a German composer. He also composed under the pseudonym Fred Langen, especially rhythmically more modern works.

== Life ==
Born in Hanover, Ilhau studied music, literature and theatre studies from 1930 to 1935 at Marburg University and the Ludwig-Maximilians-Universität München, where he received a doctorate (PhD). He joined the Christian student fraternity Marburger Wingolf In the field of music, he studied counterpoint and composition with Hans Stieber. As a student, he gave concerts under the direction of Otto Ebel von Sosen and made radio recordings under the direction of Karl List.

Afterwards, he graduated from the Tonmeisterschule in Frankfurt. Ihlau specialized as a music consultant and editor and worked at the radio stations in Hanover and at the Reichssender Königsberg. After the Second World War, he worked as a freelance journalist in Traunstein / Upper Bavaria. In 1950, he moved to WDR in Cologne as Tonmeister and was additionally appointed as the main program designer in 1961.

Ilhau retired in 1975 but remained in the music world through his compositions. Ihlau's oeuvre includes an operetta, a ballet, church music, songs, choral works and orchestral pieces.

== Work ==
=== Works for orchestra ===
- Auf der Alm – Kurpark-Bummel Intermezzo
- Zigeuner Rhapsodie (Gipsy-Rhapsody)
- Kleine Episode for salon orchestra
- Romantische Ouvertüre for large orchestra (1933)
- Serenade for flute, oboe and string orchestra (1942)

=== Works for wind orchestra ===
- 1965 Festlicher Aufklang
- 1983 Bergische Ouvertüre
- 1983 Romantisches Zwischenspiel
- 1984 Festliche Trompeten Intrada
- Bergischer Marsch
- Gut Gelaunt
- Sentimental Dreams
- Vier ernste Weisen

=== Mass and sacred music ===
- St. George's Mass in E minor (Wißkirchen) for mixed choir, soprano solo and organ
- Christmas Carol Suite for soloists (STB), Choir 1 (SSA), Choir 2 (TTBB) and Orchestra ad libitum or piano

=== Stage works ===
- 1942 Das Zauberschloss Operetta

=== Choral work ===
- Frühlingsspaziergang
- Herr Wirt habt ihr noch kühlen Wein
