= Iffland-Ring =

German theatre award

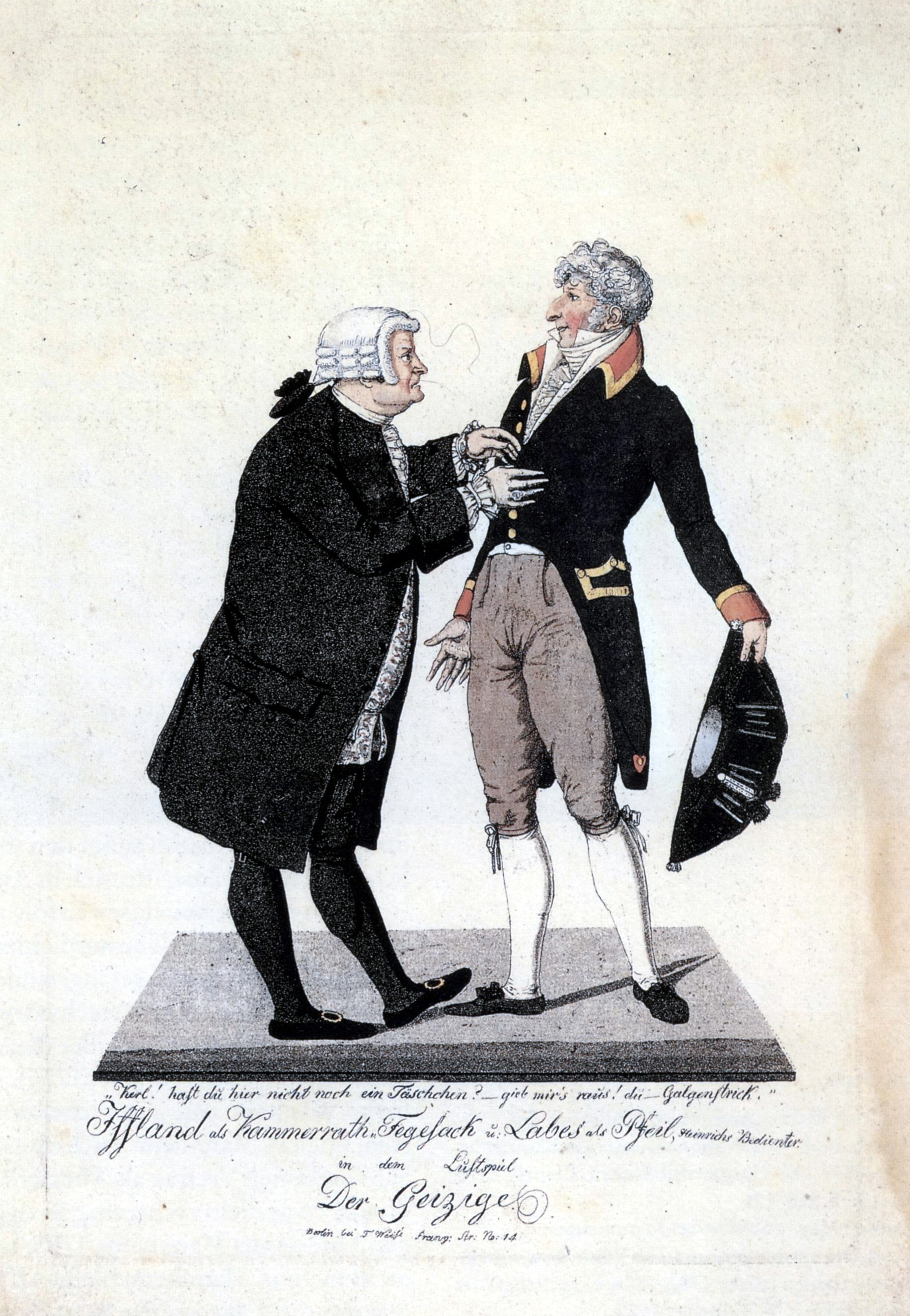
August Wilhelm Iffland and Franz Labes in Molière's Der Geizige, Berlin, c. 1810.

The Iffland-Ring is a diamond-studded ring with a picture of August Wilhelm Iffland, a prominent German actor, dramatist and theatre director of the late 18th and early 19th century, who played in works of contemporary writers Goethe and Schiller, starting in 1782. The holder of the Iffland-Ring is considered to be the "most significant and most worthy actor of the German-speaking theatre", in the opinion of the previous holder who has passed it to him by will.

One exception to this rule came in 1954, when Werner Krauß was determined not by the previous holder Albert Bassermann (1867–1952) but by a committee of German-speaking actors. Bassermann had chosen a successor three times, but on each occasion his nominee had died shortly thereafter. Bassermann considered the ring cursed, and in 1935 declined to choose a fourth successor. Since his death, the Iffland-Ring has been earmarked as the state property of the Republic of Austria, although the holder retains it until their death.

The origins of the ring are shrouded in some mystery. The apocryphal story is that it was indeed worn by Iffland, but its established history only begins a century later with its supposed fifth holder, Friedrich Haase, who has been suspected of commissioning it for himself and inventing the story.

The current holder of the ring is Jens Harzer, having been named by Bruno Ganz as his successor. By tradition, the ring is only passed from one male actor to another. Since 1977, it has had a counterpart for female actors in the Alma-Seidler-Ring, named after the actress Alma Seidler. She had been considered as a successor for the Iffland-Ring by Krauß, who held it from 1954 to 1959.

== History ==
=== Origins ===
The origins of the Iffland-Ring are shrouded in some mystery, and the current ring is said to have been the most precious of a set of seven, of which only two appear to have survived: the Iffland-Ring itself and a less valuable similar ring which in the 1950s was in the private possession of Wilhelm Burckhardsberg, but that may now also be lost.

Iffland, a leading actor in his time in Germany, was inspired by Romanticism and is claimed to have commissioned the ring, to be carried by the leading German-speaking actor of his time. If so, Iffland's inspiration was most likely the play Nathan the Wise by Gotthold Ephraim Lessing.

=== Ludwig Devrient ===
The circumstances of where and when Iffland passed on the ring to Ludwig Devrient are uncertain; according to Albert Bassermann, Iffland handed the ring to Devrient in 1814, after his last performance in Breslau. Shortly after, in September 1814, Iffland died in Berlin.

Devrient, a close friend of E. T. A. Hoffmann, whose death in 1822 he never got over, was one of the most gifted actors Germany ever produced, but also a drunkard. He collapsed while performing King Lear and died on 29 December 1832. His choice as his successor to the ring fell on his nephew Emil Devrient.

=== Emil Devrient and Theodor Döring ===
Much of the history of the ring during this period remains lost. Emil Devrient, and after him Theodor Döring, were gifted but not outstanding actors in Berlin.

=== Friedrich Haase ===
From Friedrich Haase onwards, the history of the ring is much better known.

Haase was born in Berlin, as the son of the personal servant of the then crown prince of Prussia, Friedrich Wilhelm IV. Rumor had it that he was the illegitimate son of a member of the house of Hohenzollern, something Haase used to his advantage.

After early performances in Potsdam and Weimar, Haase moved to Prague, where he had considerable success. His career took him to Karlsruhe, Munich, Frankfurt, St. Petersburg and New York, and he became one of the most successful German actors.

Neither Haase nor Döring were ever actually seen with the ring, despite both being known to have been rather vain, and one theory concerning the ring's origins has it that Haase himself had the ring made and invented its history. The now-known history of the ring in any case begins with Haase. Certain discrepancies in the wording of a note, found in the case in which the ring was kept, point in this direction, but they can also be quite easily explained otherwise. In particular, the date Haase gives for his receipt of the ring from Döring's widow, 1875, appears wrong as Döring died in 1878.

He left the ring to Albert Bassermann upon his death in 1911. Together with the ring, Haase left a note for Bassermann, dated Berlin, Christmas 1908, in which he declares his regret at their not having known each other much better. He also gives the history of the ring, and that letter became the prime source for future research into its history.

=== Albert Bassermann ===
Bassermann never wore the ring himself and named three successors during his lifetime, all of whom he survived.

He outlived his first two choices, Alexander Girardi and Max Pallenberg and upon the death of his third choice, Alexander Moissi in 1935, Bassermann placed the ring on top of Moissi's coffin, to cremate the ring alongside his last choice. The director of the Burgtheater, Hermann Röbbeling, saved the ring by taking it off the coffin, declaring that it belonged to a living actor, not a dead one. Bassermann considered the ring cursed after all three actors died shortly after he named them as his successors.

After this incident, Bassermann gave the ring to the Austrian National Library in Vienna, where it remained almost forgotten. In 1946, when Bassermann visited Vienna, Egon Hilbert, director of the Austrian theatre administration, had two meetings with the actor. Bassermann refused to take the ring back and, at the second meeting, declared that Hilbert could do with the ring as he pleased.

Hilbert asked Werner Krauss to take the ring after Bassermann died in 1952 but Krauss refused.

=== Werner Krauss ===
In October 1954, after an extraordinary meeting of the actors' guild, the ring was awarded to Werner Krauss and this time he accepted. Despite protests, especially from the Swiss actors' guild and the fact that the ring was now in private possession of Egon Hilbert, Krauss eventually received the ring. To prevent a repeat of the interregnum, laws were passed, requiring the ring bearer to always nominate a successor.

Krauss received the ring on 28 November 1954 and handed a sealed envelope to the Austrian theatre administration on 12 December, stating his choice of succession.

Like Ludwig Devrient, Krauss collapsed while performing King Lear and died on 20 October 1959, passing the ring to Josef Meinrad, his original choice in 1954. However, his widow later declared that Krauss would have liked to leave the ring to Alma Seidler, but was prevented from doing so by the fact that the ring could only be passed to a male. A female equivalent of the Iffland-Ring, the Alma-Seidler-Ring, was created upon Seidler's death in 1977.

=== Josef Meinrad ===
Meinrad's original choice of successor is not known, but in 1984, he changed his will. Upon his death in 1996, rumors were rife as to which Austrian actor would receive the ring. To the disappointment of many actors at the Burgtheater, the ring was awarded to Switzerland; Meinrad had chosen Bruno Ganz.

=== Bruno Ganz ===
The next holder of the Iffland-Ring was Swiss actor Bruno Ganz, who died 16 February 2019, aged 77.

Ganz's original choice of successor was Gert Voss, who died 13 July 2014 from leukemia, aged 72.

=== Jens Harzer ===
The current holder of the ring is German actor Jens Harzer, having been named by Bruno Ganz as his successor.

== Bearers of the Iffland-Ring ==
Ring-bearer	Born	Died	Duration	Nationality
August Wilhelm Iffland	19 April 1759	22 September 1814	?−1814	(Province of Hanover) Hanoverian / (Kingdom of Prussia) Prussian
Ludwig Devrient	15 December 1784	30 December 1832	1814–1832	(Kingdom of Prussia) Prussian
Emil Devrient	4 September 1803	7 August 1872	1832–1872	(Saxony) Saxon / (Germany) German
Theodor Döring	9 January 1803	17 August 1878	1872–1878	(Kingdom of Prussia) Prussian / (Germany) German
Friedrich Haase	1 November 1827	17 March 1911	1878–1911	(Kingdom of Prussia) Prussian / (Germany) German
Albert Bassermann (Note: Albert Bassermann was considered to be the bearer of the ring until his death in 1952 but did not have the ring in his possession after 1935.)	7 September 1867	15 May 1952	1911–1952	(Germany) German
Interregnum			1952–1954	
Werner Krauss	23 June 1884	20 October 1959	1954–1959	(Germany) German / (Austria) Austrian
Josef Meinrad	21 April 1913	18 February 1996	1959–1996	(Austria) Austrian
Bruno Ganz	22 March 1941	16 February 2019	1996–2019	(Switzerland) Swiss
Jens Harzer	14 March 1972		2019–	(Germany) German

- Note: until 1871, Germany did not exist as a country but instead was subdivided into a number of countries; citizenship before 1871 is shown as applicable.

== Laws governing the ring ==
In 1954, three basic laws were enacted concerning the possession of the ring:

- The holder of the ring has to determine a successor within three months of receiving the ring.
- Should no successor have been appointed or the documents regarding succession be lost, the federal Austrian theatre administration will form a committee to decide on a successor.
- The ring is the property of the Republic of Austria, but its future holder is determined by personal decision of the current holder.

== See also ==
- Prince des poètes
