= Alma-Seidler-Ring =

German-language theatre award

The Alma-Seidler-Ring was created in 1978 by the Austrian government as the female counterpart of the Iffland-Ring. Similar to that ring, the holder, or bearer, of the Alma-Seidler-Ring is considered to be the "most significant and most worthy actress of the German-speaking theatre", in the opinion of the previous holder who has passed it to her by will.

The ring is named after the Austrian actress Alma Seidler (1899–1977). According to the widow of Werner Krauss, holder of the Iffland-Ring from 1954 to 1959, he would have preferred to pass the ring to Seidler, had tradition not prevented him from willing it to a woman.

== Bearers of the Alma-Seidler-Ring ==
Ring-Bearer	Born	Died	Duration	Nationality
Paula Wessely	20 January 1907	11 May 2000	1979–2000	(Austria) Austrian
Annemarie Düringer	26 November 1925	26 November 2014	2000–2014	(Switzerland) Swiss
Regina Fritsch	1964		Since 2014	(Austria) Austrian
