= Karl von Holtei =

German poet and actor (1798–1880)

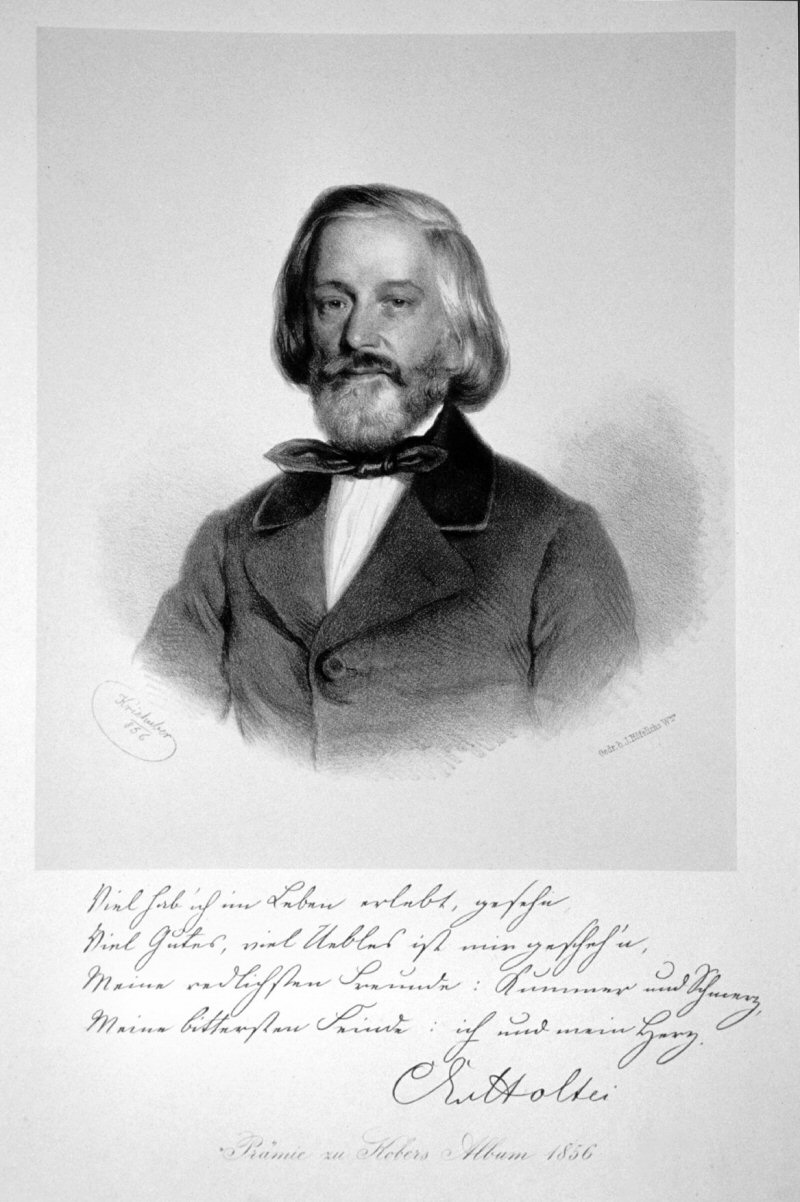
Lithography of Karl von Holtei

Karl Eduard von Holtei (24 January 1798 – 12 February 1880) was a German poet and actor.

== Life and career ==
Karl Eduard von Holtei was born at Breslau, the son of an officer of Hussars. Having served in the Prussian army as a volunteer in 1815, he shortly afterwards entered the University of Breslau as a student of law; but, attracted by the stage, he soon forsook academic life and made his debut in the Breslau theatre as Mortimer in Schiller's Maria Stuart. He led a wandering life for the next two years, appearing less on the stage as an actor than as a reciter of his own poems. In 1821 he married the actress Luise Roge (1800-1825), and was appointed theatre-poet to the Breslau stage. He next removed to Berlin, where his wife fulfilled an engagement at the Court theatre. During his sojourn here he produced the vaudevilles Die Wiener in Berlin (1824), and Die Berliner in Wien (1825), pieces which enjoyed at the time great popular favour.

In 1825 his wife died; but soon after her death he accepted an engagement at the Königsstädter theatre in Berlin, when he wrote a number of plays, notably Lenore (1828), based on Gottfried August Bürger's ballad, and Der alte Feldherr (1825). In 1830 he married Julie Holzbecher (1809-1839), an actress engaged at the same theatre, and with her played in Darmstadt. Returning to Berlin in 1831 he wrote for the composer Franz Gläser (1798-1861) the text of the opera Des Adlers Horst (1832), and for Ludwig Devrient the drama, Der dumme Peter (1837).

In 1833 Holtei again went on the stage and toured with his wife to various important cities, Hamburg, Leipzig, Dresden, Munich and Vienna. In the last his declamatory powers as a reciter, particularly of Shakespeare's plays, made a furore, and the poet-actor was given the appointment of manager of the Josefstädter theatre in the last-named city. Though proud of his successes both as actor and reciter, Holtei left Vienna in 1836, and from 1837 to 1839 conducted the theatre in Riga. Here his second wife died, and after wandering through Germany reciting and accepting a short engagement at Breslau, he settled in 1847 at Graz, where he devoted himself to a literary life and produced the novels Die Vagabunden (1851), Christian Lammfell (1853) and Der letzte Komödiant (1863). The last years of his life were spent at Breslau, where being in poor circumstances he found a home in the Kloster der Barmherzigen Brüder, and here he died.

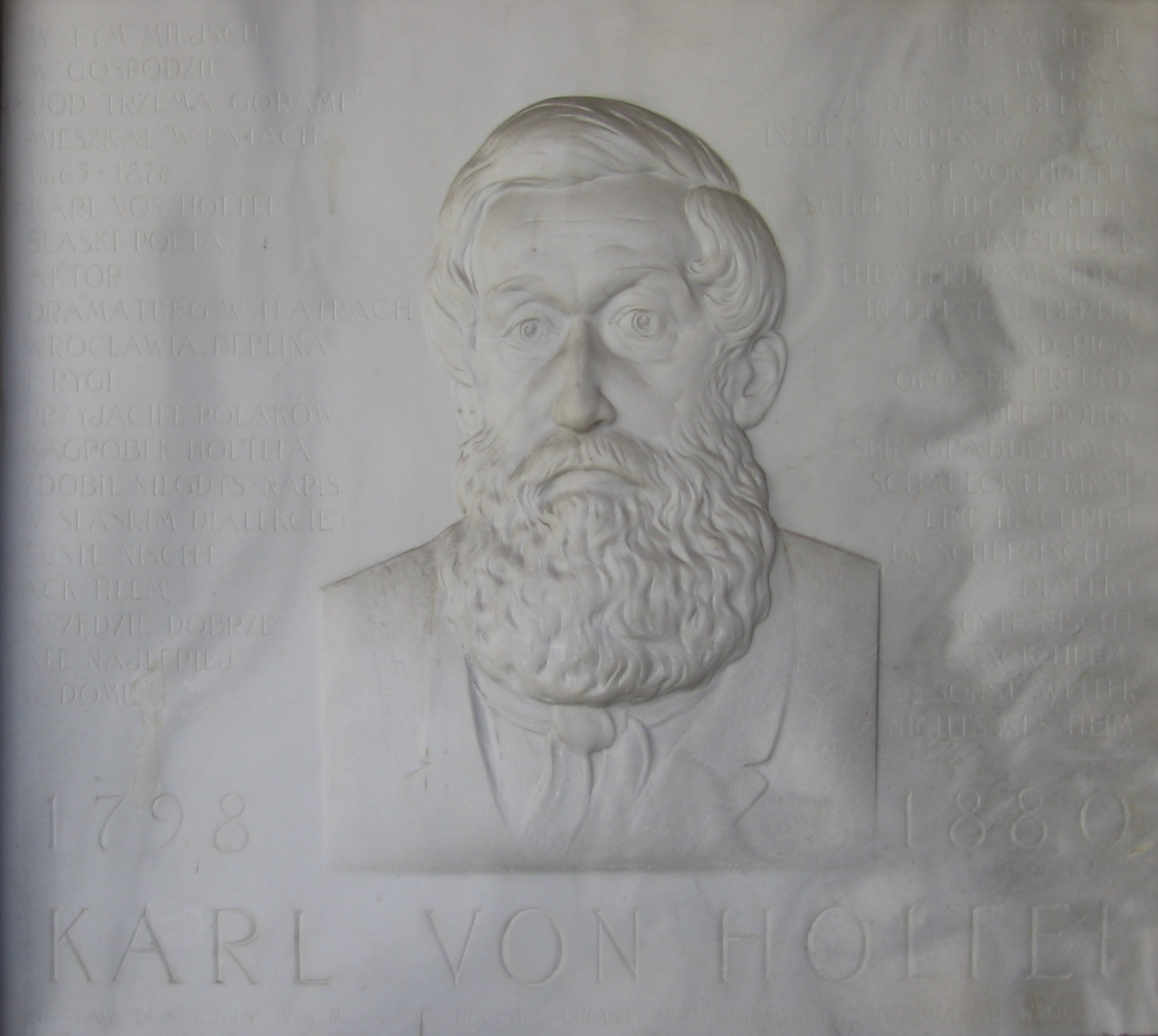
Memorial plaque in Breslau

As a dramatist Holtei may be said to have introduced the vaudeville into Germany; as an actor, although remaining behind the greater artists of his time, he contrived to fascinate his audience by the dramatic force of his exposition of character as a reciter, especially of Shakespeare, he knew no rival. August Lewald said of Holtei that by the energy of his poetic conception and plastic force he brought his audience round to his own ideas; and he added, "an eloquence such as his I have never met with in any other German."

Holtei was not only a stage-poet but, a lyric-writer of great charm. Notable among such productions are Schlesische Gedichte (1830; 20th edition, 1893), Gedichte (5th edition, 1861), Stimmen des Waldes (2nd edition, 1854). Mention ought also to be made of Holtei's interesting autobiography, Vierzig Jahre (8 vols., 1843-1850; 3rd edition, 1862) with the supplementary volume Noch ein Jahr in Schlesien (1864).

Holtei's Theater appeared in 6 volumes (1867); his Erzählende Schriften, 39 volumes (1861-1866).
