= Die Hochzeit des Camacho =

- Singspiel by Felix Mendelssohn
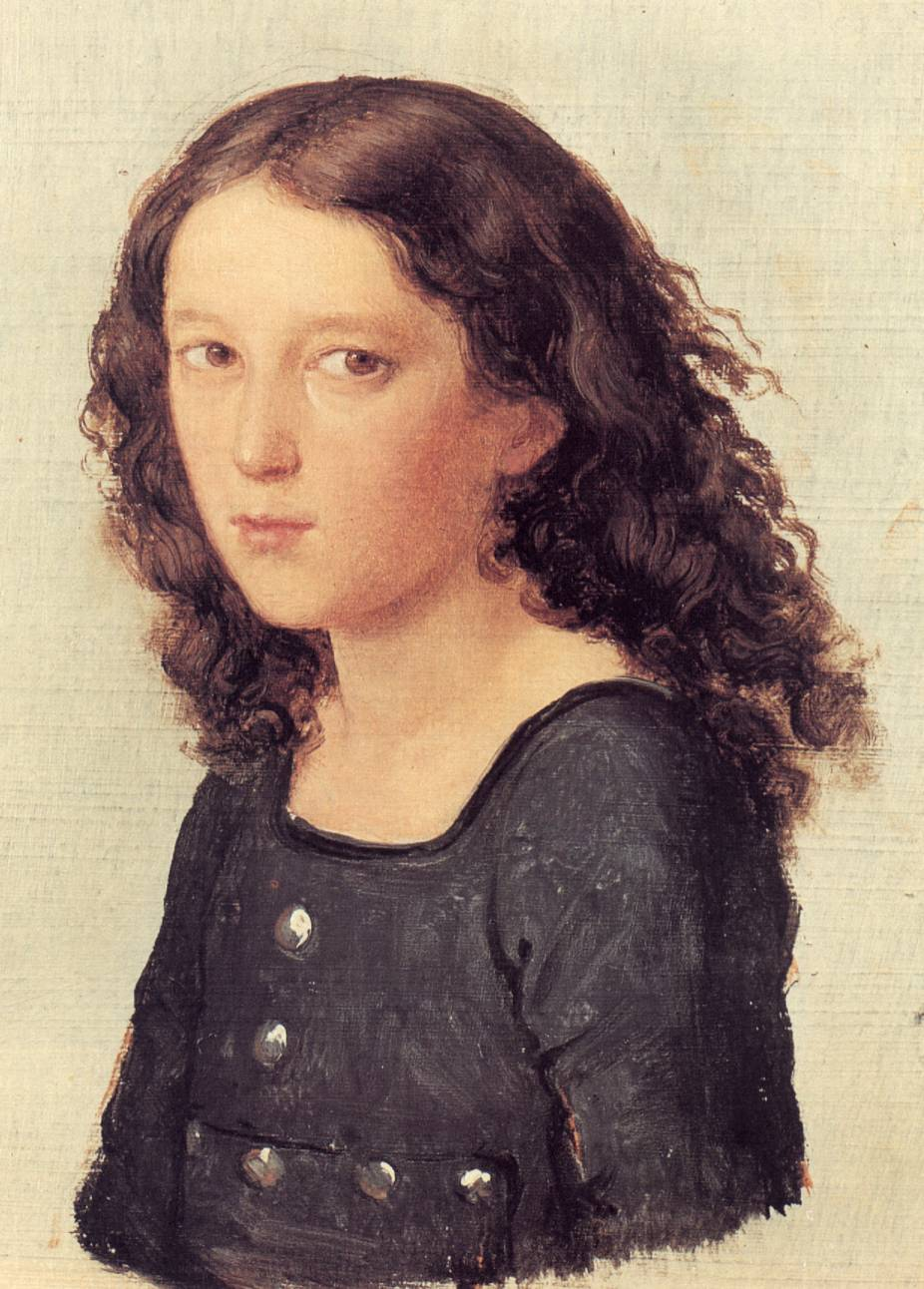
- The composer, who wrote the piece for a family performance around 1824, in 1821
- Translation: Camacho's Wedding
- Librettist: Friedrich Voigts?
- Language: German
- Based on: episode in Don Quixote by Cervantes
- Premiere: 29 April 1827; Schauspielhaus, Berlin

Die Hochzeit des Camacho (Camacho's Wedding) is a Singspiel in two acts by Felix Mendelssohn, to a libretto probably written largely by Friedrich Voigts, based on an episode in Don Quixote by Cervantes. The opera is listed as Mendelssohn's op. 10. It was written between 1824 and 1825, and first performed publicly at the Berlin Schauspielhaus on 29 April 1827.

== Background ==
Mendelssohn was only 15 when he began to write Camacho, but he had already written other Singspiel for performance within the family circle. The first act was completed in 1824, and he began work on the overture in February 1825. He revised Camacho carefully to make it worthy of public performance. According to Felix's friend Eduard Devrient, who was to sing the role of Camacho, "motherly fondness yearned to witness the son's great success". The music to Camacho indicates that he had carefully studied the operas of Carl Maria von Weber and of Mozart. Despite Mendelssohn's youth, there are some striking features, including what is in effect a leitmotif played on the brass to characterise Don Quixote, which is also heard in the opening bars of the overture and in the opera's final cadence.

Before the work was accepted for the Berlin stage, it was reviewed by Spontini, who was conductor at the Berlin Court Opera. According to Devrient:

The score was criticised with pitying deprecation, winding up with the following admonition – as Spontini led the young man to the window which was opposite to the dome of the Jewish church [synagogue] – 'Mon ami, il vous faut des idées grandes, grandes comme cette coupole'. [My friend, you should have big ideas, as big as that dome]

The rehearsals were hampered by the illness of Blume (he contracted jaundice) who was singing Quixote. In the event, Mendelssohn grew impatient during the premiere, and left before the second act. Devrient comments, "the house was crowded with well-wishers, and the applause was profuse and enthusiastic; the music however did not give genuine pleasure". Some acerbic criticism appeared in the press, some of it apparently taunting Mendelssohn's Jewish origins. The poet Ludwig Rellstab also criticised the cumbersome libretto. The experience soured Mendelssohn towards both opera and journalism. He cancelled all further performances of Camacho; it remained therefore the only one of his operas to have a public performance in his lifetime. However, a piano score of the opera was published in 1828, probably subsidized by Felix's father Abraham Mendelssohn.

There was a single performance of the opera in Boston in 1885, but the first modern performance of Mendelssohn's final version of the opera was on 24 February 1987 at the Oxford Playhouse. In 1992 Jos Van Immerseel made a CD-recording of the work (Channel Classics).

== Roles ==
Roles, voice types, premiere cast
Role	Voice type	Premiere cast, 29 April 1827
Quiteria	soprano	
Basilio, her lover	tenor	
Carrasco, her father	bass	Eduard Devrient
Camacho, his neighbour	tenor	
Don Quixote	baritone	Heinrich Blume
Sancho Panza	bass	
Lucinda	soprano	
Vivaldo	tenor	

== Synopsis ==
Carrasco intends Quiteria, against her will, to marry Camacho. Don Quixote and Sancho Panza are invited to the wedding celebrations. Basilio, Quiteria's true love, enlists Lucinda and Vivaldo to assist him by various stratagems. Many of these are foiled inadvertently by the eccentric behaviour of Quixote. Eventually Basilio pretends to stab himself and begs to marry Quiteria so that he can die happy. On Basilio's instant recovery after the ceremony, Camacho admits defeat.

== Discography ==
Rosmarie Hofmann (Quiteria), Andrea Ulbrich (Lucinda), Scot Weir (Basilio), Huw Rhys-Evans (Vivaldo), Nico van der Meel (Camacho), Waldemar Wild (Carrasco), Urban Malmberg (Sancho Panza), Ulrik Cold (Don Quixote). Director Jos van Immerseel, Anima Eterna, Der Junger Chor Aachen & Chor Modus Novus. Channel Classics CCS 5593 (2CD). September 1992

== Sources ==
- Eduard Devrient, tr. Natalia Macfarren, My Reminiscences of Felix Mendelssohn-Bartholdy, London, 1869
- R. Larry Todd, Mendelssohn, A Life in Music. Oxford, 2003
