= Bruno Ganz =

Swiss actor (1941–2019)

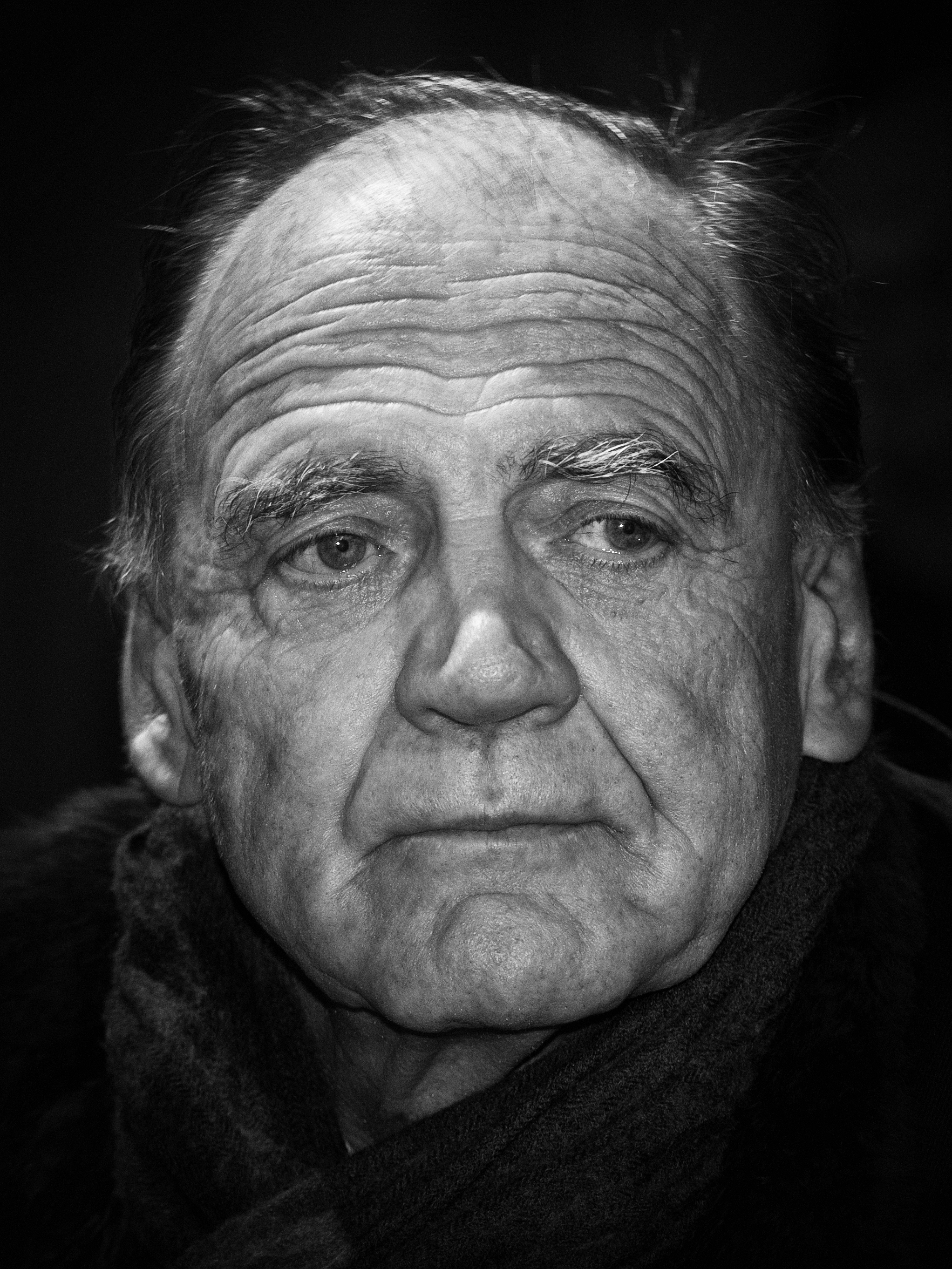
- Ganz in 2011
- Born: 22 March 1941; Zürich, Switzerland
- Died: 16 February 2019 (aged 77); Au, Wädenswil, Switzerland
- Resting place: Friedhof Rehalp, Zürich
- Occupation: Actor
- Years active: 1960–2019
- Spouse: Sabine Ganz (m. 1965, separated)
- Partner: Ruth Walz
- Children: 1
- Awards: "Actor of the Year" by Theater heute; Hans-Reinhart-Ring; Iffland-Ring; Swiss Film Prize; David di Donatello; European Film Award; Austrian Decoration for Science and Art; Order of Merit of the Federal Republic of Germany; Lifetime Achievement Award, Goldene Kamera

Bruno Ganz (Swiss Standard German: [ˈbruːnoː ˈɡants]; 22 March 1941 – 16 February 2019) (Note: Some media reports use an incorrect date and an incorrect place of death. Ganz died on 16 February 2019 (Swiss time) at his home in Au. Au is a village and a quarter of the municipality of Wädenswil, which is near Zürich.) was a Swiss actor whose career in German stage, television and film productions spanned nearly 60 years. He was known for his collaborations with the directors Werner Herzog, Éric Rohmer, Francis Ford Coppola, Theo Angelopoulos and Wim Wenders, earning widespread recognition with his roles as Jonathan Zimmerman in The American Friend (1977), Jonathan Harker in Nosferatu the Vampyre (1979) and Damiel the Angel in Wings of Desire (1987).

Ganz received renewed international acclaim for his portrayal of Adolf Hitler in the Academy Award-nominated film Downfall (2004). He also had roles in several English-language films, including The Boys from Brazil (1978), Strapless (1989), The Last Days of Chez Nous (1992), Luther (2003), The Manchurian Candidate (2004), The Reader (2008), Unknown (2011), The Counselor (2013) and Remember (2015). On stage, Ganz portrayed Dr. Heinrich Faust in Peter Stein's staging of Faust, Part One and Faust, Part Two in 2000.

== Early life ==
Ganz was born on 22 March 1941 in Zürich to a Swiss-German factory-worker father and a northern Italian mother. He had decided to pursue an acting career by the time he entered university. He was equally drawn to stage and screen but initially enjoyed greater success on the stage.

== Career ==
=== Stage career ===
Ganz made his theatrical debut in 1961 and devoted himself mainly to the stage for almost the next two decades. In 1970, he helped found the Berliner Schaubühne ensemble and two years later performed in the Salzburg Festival premiere of Thomas Bernhard's Der Ignorant und der Wahnsinnige, under the direction of Claus Peymann. The German magazine Theater heute solidified Ganz's reputation as a stage actor by pronouncing him Schauspieler des Jahres (Actor of the Year) in 1973. One of Ganz's most physically demanding stage portrayals was the title character in Peter Stein's 2000 production of Johann Wolfgang von Goethe's Faust (Parts I and II); he suffered injuries during rehearsals which delayed his starting in the role. He also served as a speaker in classical music works, including a 1993 recording of Luigi Nono's Il canto sospeso with the Berlin Philharmonic Orchestra.

=== Film career ===
In 1960 Ganz landed his first film role, in Der Herr mit der schwarzen Melone (The Man in the Black Derby). Despite the support of the lead actor, Gustav Knuth, Ganz's cinematic debut was not particularly successful and it was only many years later that his career in film got off the ground.

Ganz made his film breakthrough in a major part in the 1976 film Summerfolk, launching a widely recognized film career in Europe and the United States. He worked with several directors of the New German Cinema such as Werner Herzog and Wim Wenders, and also with international directors like Éric Rohmer and Francis Ford Coppola, among others. In 1977, he co-starred with Dennis Hopper in Wenders' American Friend, an adaptation of Patricia Highsmith's novel Ripley's Game, playing a terminally ill father who gets hired as a professional killer. In 1979, he starred opposite Klaus Kinski in Herzog's Nosferatu: Phantom der Nacht (Nosferatu: Phantom of the Night). Ganz played a professor opposite Laurence Olivier in the thriller The Boys from Brazil (1978), about Nazi fugitives.

In 1987 Ganz first played the role of the angel Damiel in Wim Wenders's Wings of Desire. He reprised the role in Faraway, So Close! in 1993. Ganz appeared in The Reader as a Holocaust survivor and as the police officer Horst Herold in The Baader Meinhof Complex, which were both nominated for the 81st Academy Awards (Best Picture and Best Foreign Language Film respectively). In 2003, he portrayed Johann von Staupitz in Luther. In 2011, he appeared as a former Stasi operator opposite Liam Neeson in Unknown. Among Ganz's later roles were the grandfather in the literary adaptation Heidi (2015), a pseudo-scientific healer in Sally Potter's The Party (2017) and the ancient Roman poet Virgil in Lars von Trier's The House that Jack Built (2018).

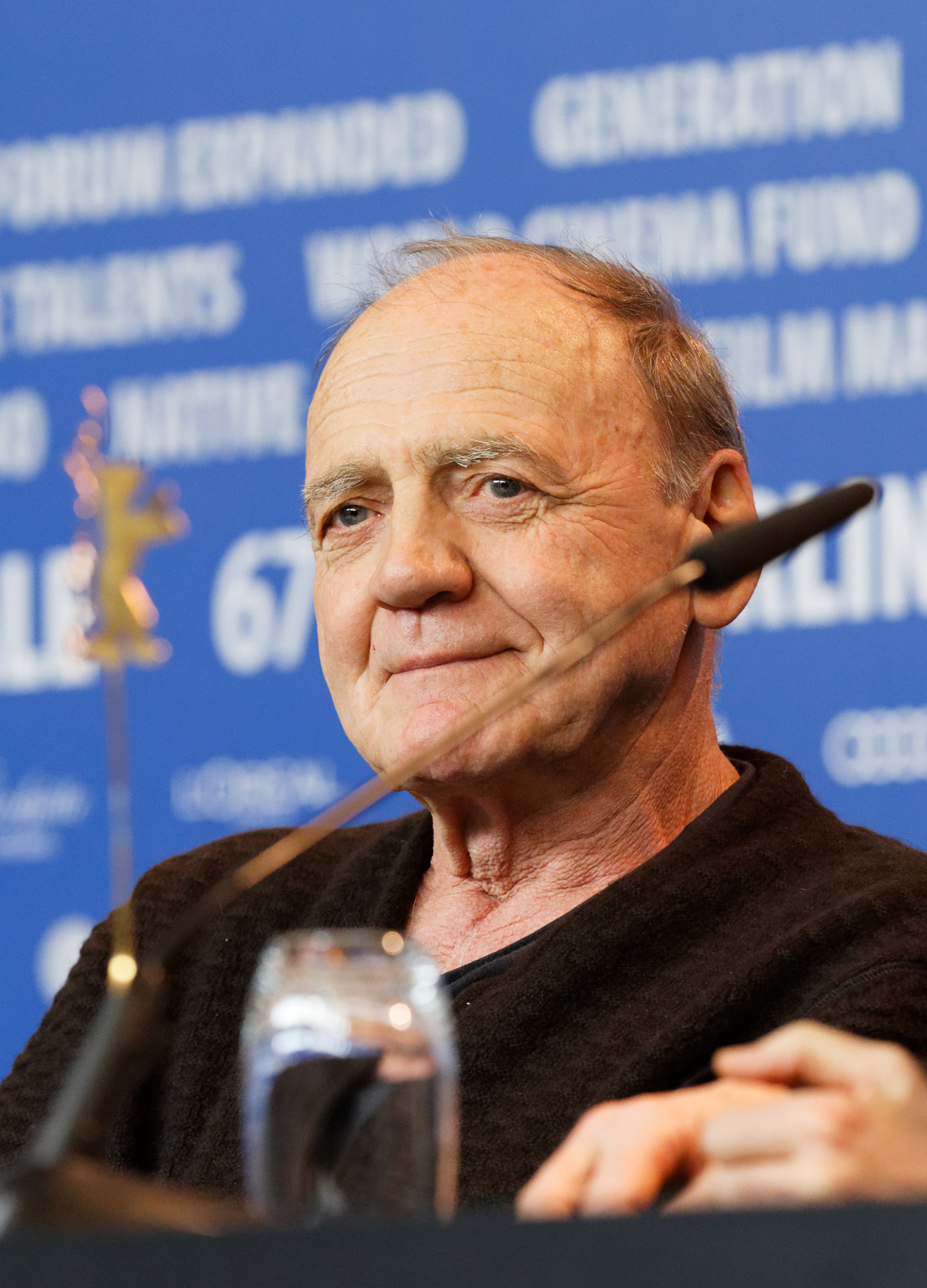
Ganz in 2017

Ganz portrayed Adolf Hitler in Der Untergang (Downfall) (2004) after four months of researching the role. His performance was widely acclaimed by critics; Rob Mackie, writing for The Guardian, described Ganz as "the most convincing screen Hitler yet: an old, bent, sick dictator with the shaking hands of someone with Parkinson's, alternating between rage and despair in his last days in the bunker". His performance has inspired many parodies on YouTube, using video and audio from the film with humorous subtitles.

== Personal life and death ==
Ganz was married to Sabine from 1965 until his death, although they were separated for a long time; their son, Daniel, was born in 1972. In the early 1970s, Ganz had a year-long romantic relationship with actress Romy Schneider.

In February 2018, doctors in Salzburg found that Ganz was suffering from intestinal cancer, and he immediately began chemotherapy. Ganz died on 16 February 2019 at his home in the village of Au, in Wädenswil, Switzerland, at the age of 77. He was attended by his partner, the theatrical photographer Ruth Walz, and his son Daniel.

From 1996 until his death in 2019, Ganz held the 200-year-old Iffland-Ring, which passes from actor to actor—each bequeathing the ring to the next holder, judging that actor to be the "most significant and most worthy actor of the German-speaking theatre". Ganz was also honored with the Order of Merit of Germany and was made a knight of the French Légion d'honneur.

== Awards and honors ==
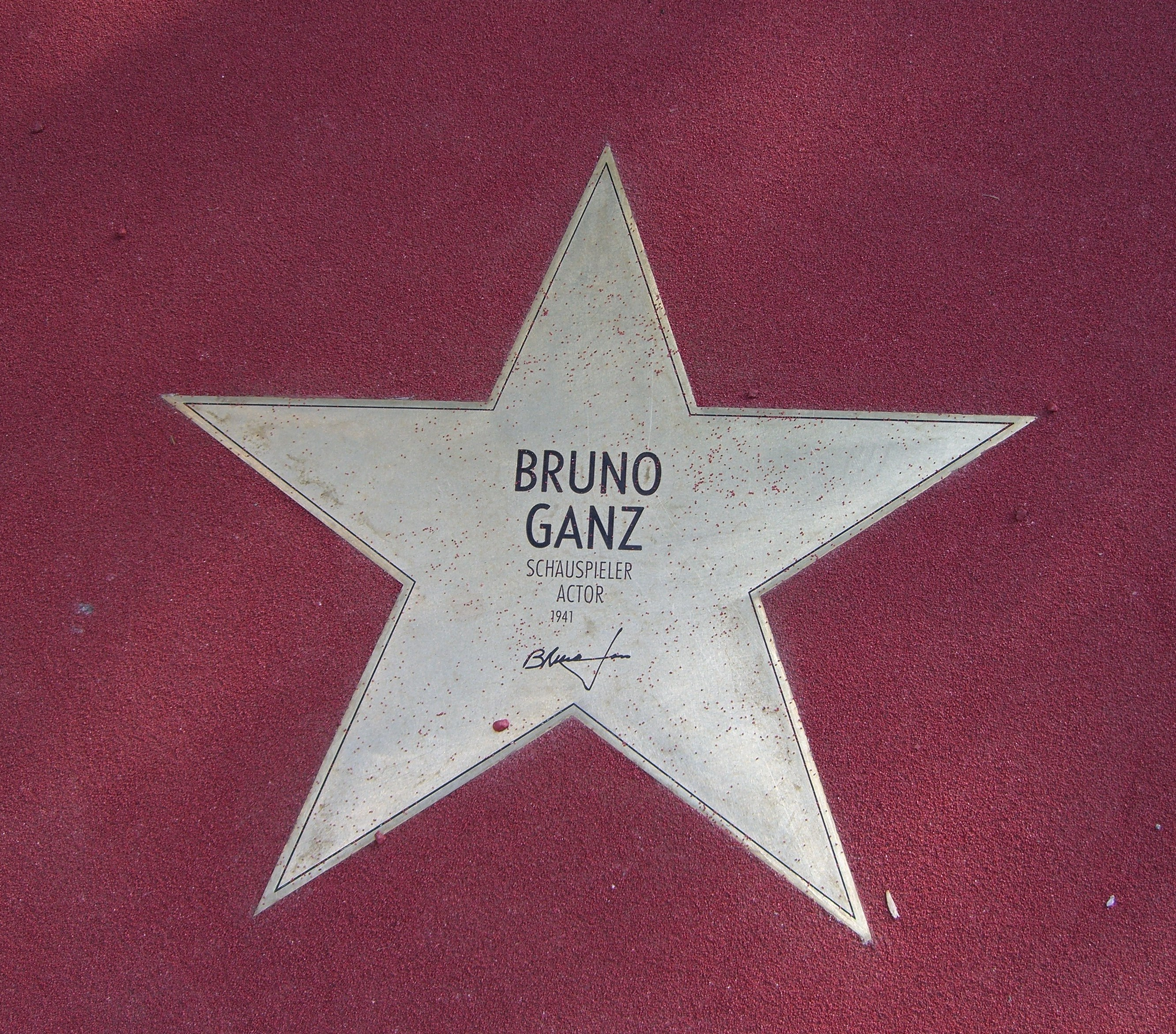
Star on the Boulevard of the Stars in Berlin

- 1973: "Actor of the Year" in German magazine Theater heute
- 1991: Hans-Reinhart-Ring, given by the Swiss Society for Theatre Culture
- 1996: Iffland-Ring
- 1998: Officier of the Ordre des Arts et des Lettres (France)
- 2000: Swiss Film Prize
- 2000: David di Donatello Award for Bread and Tulips
- 2004: European Film Award
- 2005: Austrian Decoration for Science and Art
- 2006: Officer's Cross of the Order of Merit of the Federal Republic of Germany
- 2010: Star on the Boulevard of the Stars in Berlin
- 2011: Pardo alla Carriera at Locarno International Film Festival
- 2012: Asteroid 199900 Brunoganz, discovered by Silvano Casulli in 2007, was named in his honor
- 2014: Lifetime Achievement Award, Goldene Kamera
- 2015: Special Golden Camera 300 for lifetime achievement, Manaki Brothers Film Festival

== Filmography ==
Ganz appeared in the following films:

- The Man in the Black Derby (1960), as Bellboy
- Chikita (1961)
- Es Dach überem Chopf (1962), as Fred Weber
- The Smooth Career (1967), as Barnhard Kral
- Eine große Familie (1970, TV Movie), as Heinz Hallasch
- Summerfolk (Sommergäste, 1976), as Jakov Shalimov
- Lumière (1976), as Heinrich Grün
- The Marquise of O... (1976), as Der Graf
- Die Wildente (The Wild Duck, 1976), as Gregers
- The American Friend (Der Amerikanische Freund, 1977), as Jonathan Zimmermann
- Die linkshändige Frau (The Left-Handed Woman, 1978), as Bruno
- The Boys from Brazil (1978), as Professor Bruckner
- Schwarz und weiß wie Tage und Nächte (1978, TV Movie), as Thomas Rosemund
- Messer im Kopf (Knife in the Head, 1978), as Dr. Berthold Hoffmann
- Nosferatu: Phantom der Nacht (Nosferatu the Vampyre, 1979), as Jonathan Harker
- Retour à la bien-aimée (Return to the Beloved, 1979), as Dr. Stephan Kern
- Oggetti smarriti (Lost and Found / Lost Objects / An Italian Woman, 1980), as Werner
- 5% de risque (1980), as David
- Polenta (1980), as Jules, the Narrator
- Der Erfinder (The Inventor, 1980), as Jakob Nüssli
- La provinciale (1980), as Remy
- Etwas wird sichtbar (1981)
- La Dame aux camélias (The Lady of the Camellias, 1981), as Count Perregaux
- Ręce do góry (Hands Up!, 1981)
- Die Fälschung (Circle of Deceit, 1981), as Georg Laschen
- Logik des Gefühls (The Logic of Emotion, 1982)
- Krieg und Frieden (War and Peace, 1982)
- Dans la ville blanche (In the White City, 1983), as Paul
- Closed Circuit (System ohne Schatten, 1983), as Faber
- Killer aus Florida (Killer from Florida, 1983, Short)
- De ijssalon (Private Resistance, 1985), as Gustav
- El río de oro (1986), as Peter
- Der Pendler (1986)
- Väter und Söhne – Eine deutsche Tragödie (1986, TV Mini-Series), as Heinrich Beck
- Der Himmel über Berlin (Wings of Desire, 1987), as Damiel
- Un amore di donna (1988), as Franco Bassani
- Von Zeit zu Zeit (1989), as Jumbo
- Bankomatt (1989), as Bruno
- Strapless (1989), as Raymond Forbes
- The Legendary Life of Ernest Hemingway (1989), as Ezra Pound
- Tassilo (1991, TV Series), as Tassilo
- Erfolg (Success, 1991), as Jacques Tüverlin
- Children of Nature (1991), as Engill
- La Domenica specialmente (Especially on Sunday, 1991), as Vittorio (segment "La domenica specialmente")
- Prague (1992), as Josef
- Brandnacht (Night on Fire, 1992), as Peter Keller
- L'Absence (The Absence, 1992), as Player
- The Last Days of Chez Nous (1992), as J.P.
- In weiter Ferne, so nah! (Faraway, So Close!, 1993), as Damiel
- Heller Tag (1994), as Georg
- Diario senza date (1995)
- Tödliches Schweigen (Deadly Silence, 1996, TV Movie), as Hans Plache
- Saint-Ex (1997), as Antoine de Saint-Exupéry
- Gegen Ende der Nacht (Daybreak, 1998, TV Movie), as Fehleisen
- Mia aioniotita kai mia mera (Eternity and a Day, 1998), as Alexandros
- You Can't Go Home Again (1999), as Narrator (voice)
- WerAngstWolf (2000)
- Pane e Tulipani (Bread and Tulips, 2000), as Fernando Girasole
- Johann Wolfgang von Goethe: Faust (2001, TV Movie), as Faust
- La forza del passato (The Power of the Past, 2002), as Bogliasco
- Epsteins Nacht (Epstein's Night, 2002), as Adam Rose
- Behind Me (2002), as Himself
- Luther (2003), as Johann von Staupitz
- The Manchurian Candidate (2004), as Delp
- Der Untergang (Downfall, 2004), as Adolf Hitler
- Have No Fear: The Life of Pope John Paul II (2005, TV Movie), as Cardinal Stefan Wyszynski
- Vitus (2006), as Grandfather
- Baruto no Gakuen (バルトの楽園; Ode an die Freude, 2006), as Kurt Heinrich
- Youth Without Youth (2007), as Prof. Roman Stanciulescu
- Stairway to Nowhere (2008), as Brot Darsteller
- Der Baader Meinhof Komplex (The Baader Meinhof Complex, 2008), as Horst Herold
- Η Σκόνη του Χρόνου (The Dust of Time, 2008), as Jacob
- The Reader (2008), as Professor Rohl
- Giulias Verschwinden (2009), as John
- The Day of the Cat (2010), as Kater
- Taxiphone: El Mektoub (2010)
- Satte Farben vor Schwarz (Colors in the Dark, 2010), as Fred
- Das Ende ist mein Anfang (The End Is My Beginning, 2010), as Tiziano Terzani
- Unknown (2011), as Ernst Jürgen
- Sport de filles (2011), as Franz Mann
- Night Train to Lisbon (2013), as Older Jorge O'Kelly
- Age of Uprising: The Legend of Michael Kohlhaas (2013), as The Governor
- The Counselor (2013), as the Diamond Dealer
- In Order of Disappearance (2014), as Papa
- Amnesia (2015), as Bruno, Jo's grandfather
- Remember (2015), as Rudy Kurlander #1
- Heidi (2015), as Alpöhi, Heidi's grandfather
- Un Juif pour l'exemple (2016), as Arthur Bloch
- The Party (2017), as Gottfried
- In Times of Fading Light (2017), as Wilhelm Powileit
- Fortuna (2018), as Brother Jean
- The House That Jack Built (2018), as Verge
- The Tobacconist (2018), as Sigmund Freud
- The Witness (2018), as Nikola Radin
- A Hidden Life (2019), as Judge Lueben
- Winter Journey (2019), as Gunther Goldschmidt (final film role)
