= Doris Devrient =

German actress and singer (1801–1882)

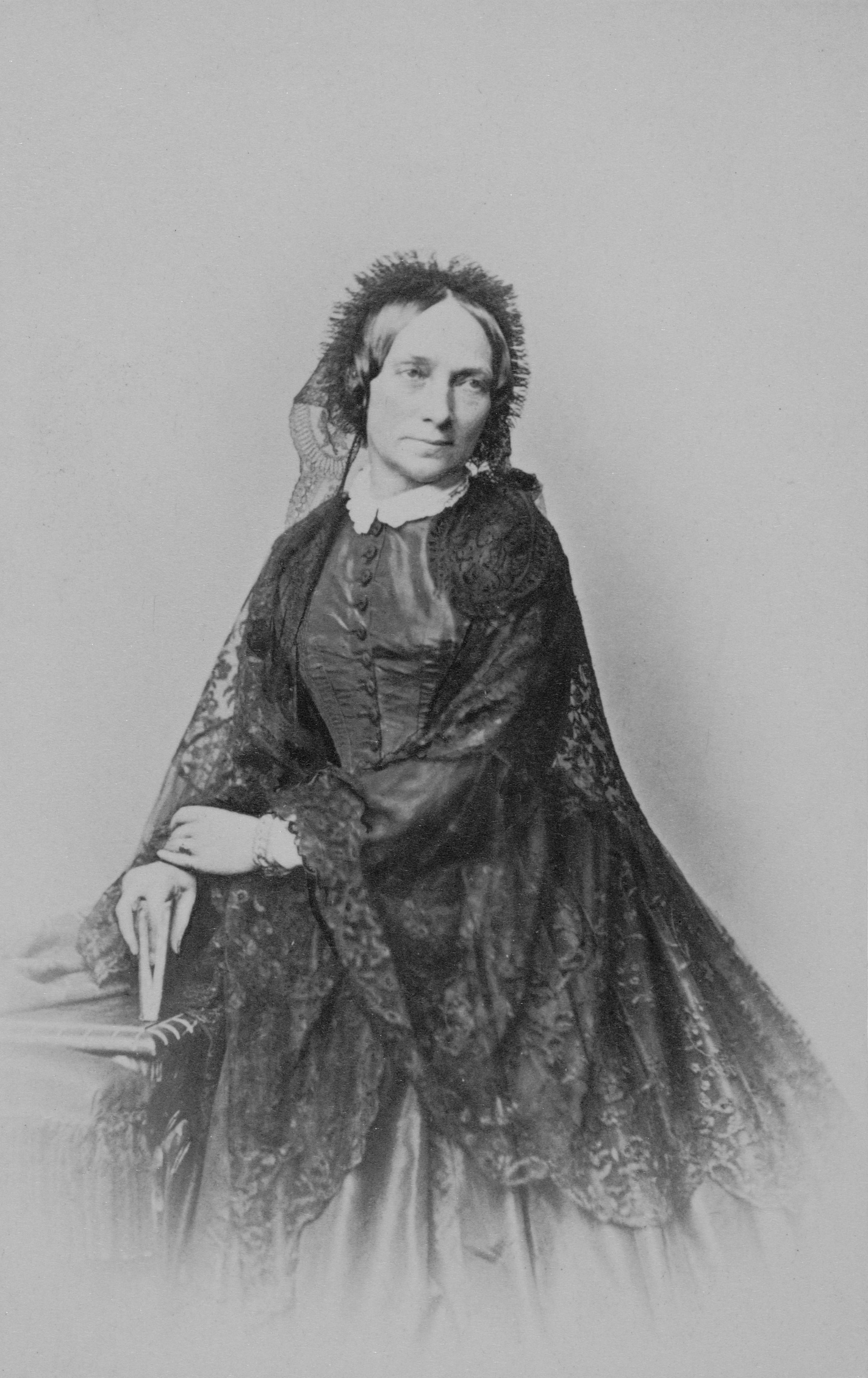
- Doris Devrient in c. 1860
- Born: Dorothee Caroline Böhler; 20 February 1801; Kassel, Hesse, Germany
- Died: 29 May 1882 (aged 81); Blasewitz, Dresden, Germany
- Other names: Doris Böhler; Dorothea Böhler; Dorothea Devrient
- Occupations: Actress, opera singer
- Years active: 1814–1843
- Spouse: Emil Devrient (m. 1825; div. 1842)
- Children: 4
- Relatives: Christine Genast (sister)

Dorothea Caroline "Doris" Devrient (née Böhler; 20 February 1801 – 29 May 1882) was a German actress and soprano singer, best known for her comedic and soubrettes roles.

== Early life ==
Dorothee Caroline Böhler was born on 20 February 1801 (Note: According to Carl-Maria-von-Weber-Gesamtausgabe, but other sources conflict on birth date and year) in Kassel to actors William and Julia Böhler. Her father originally worked as a lawyer in Mannheim but was persuaded to take up acting by August Wilhelm Iffland and then gained a reputation in Frankfurt am Main for comic and character roles. Her father personally educated her and her older sister Christine himself.

She made her acting debut on 22 July 1814 as Hannchen in Der kleine Matrose. Her father's death in 1816 prompted her mother and sister to accept an engagement at the Estates Theatre in Prague, where Doris portrayed children's parts.

Along with her mother and sister, she went to the Stadttheater in Leipzig in 1817, which was then under the direction of Karl Theodor von Küstner, where she continued to be a child actor. During this time she was known as the "little Böhler", while her sister was known as the "great Böhler". There she met actor Emil Devrient and married him on 3 February 1825.

== Career ==
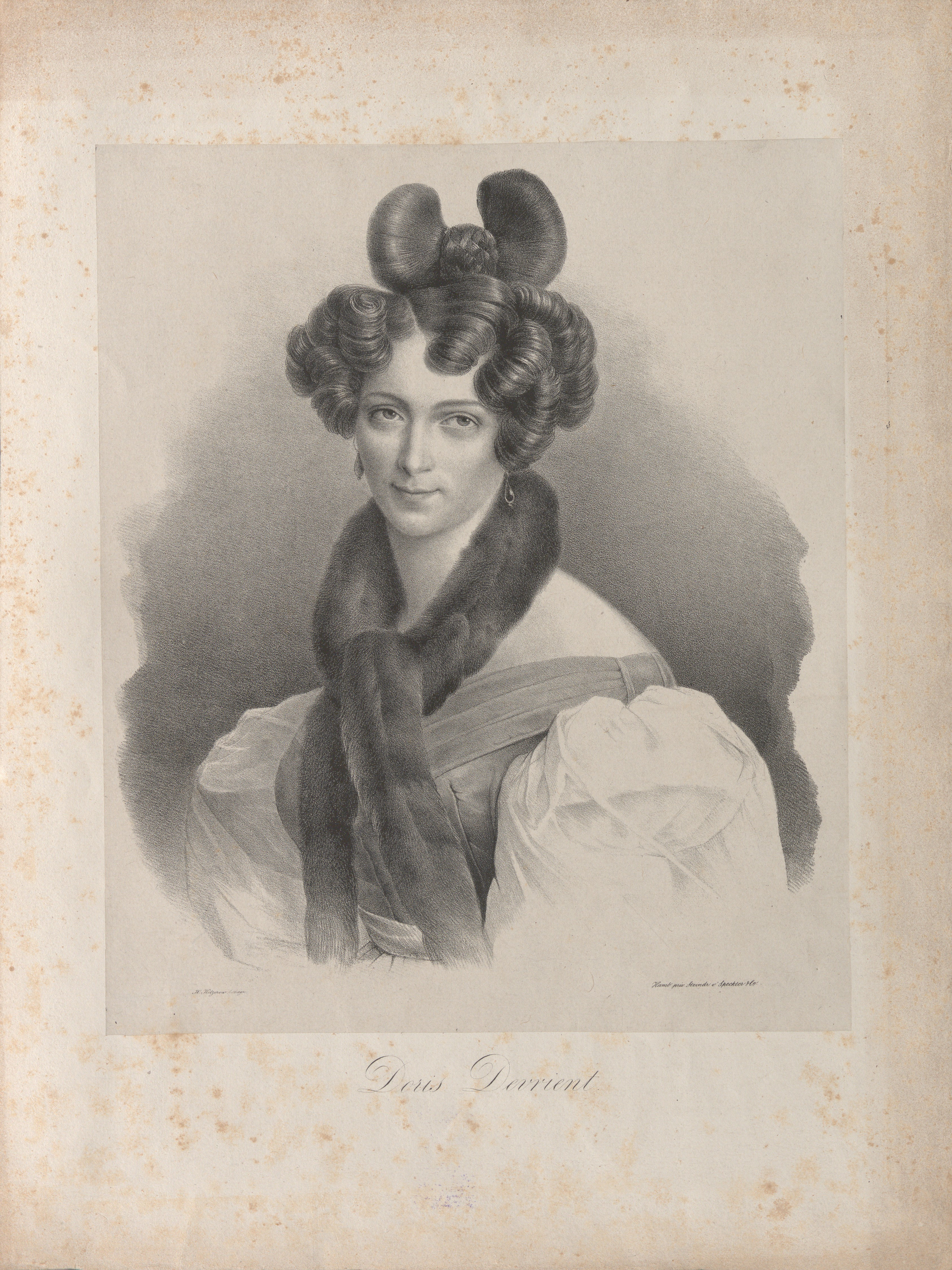
Doris Devrient lithograph by Carl Heinrich Kitzerow

Devrient specialised in comedic and soubrettes roles.

In 1828, she sang the part of Emmy in the Leipzig premiere of Heinrich Marschner's Der Vampyr. The same year, Devrient and her husband Emil left Leipzig and then was engaged in Hamburg and performed there together. After her husband had an argument, the couple transferred to the Dresden Court Theatre where she worked from 1831 to 1843.

She also had roles in Minna von Barnhelm, Bezämte Widerspenstige, Bräutigam von Mexico, Welcher ist der Bräutigam, Laune des Berliebten, Donna Diana, Hagestolzen on the stage.

== Personal life and death ==
The Devrients had four children together but their marriage started to fail in the late 1830s as the natural and fun-loving Doris clashed with the emotionally controlling Emil. In 1842, she fell in love with a Polish merchant. Because her husband would not agree to a divorce, she filed against herself as an adulteress and was sent to prison for it. However, it brought her a divorce. The scandal ended her career as a court actress in 1843. After her release, she married her lover and went with him to Poland, while her husband Emil gained custody of their children. However, this marriage also failed, and Devrient returned to Dresden in the 1870s.

Devrient died on 29 May 1882 in Blasewitz in Dresden.
