= Regina Fritsch =

Austrian actress (born 1964)

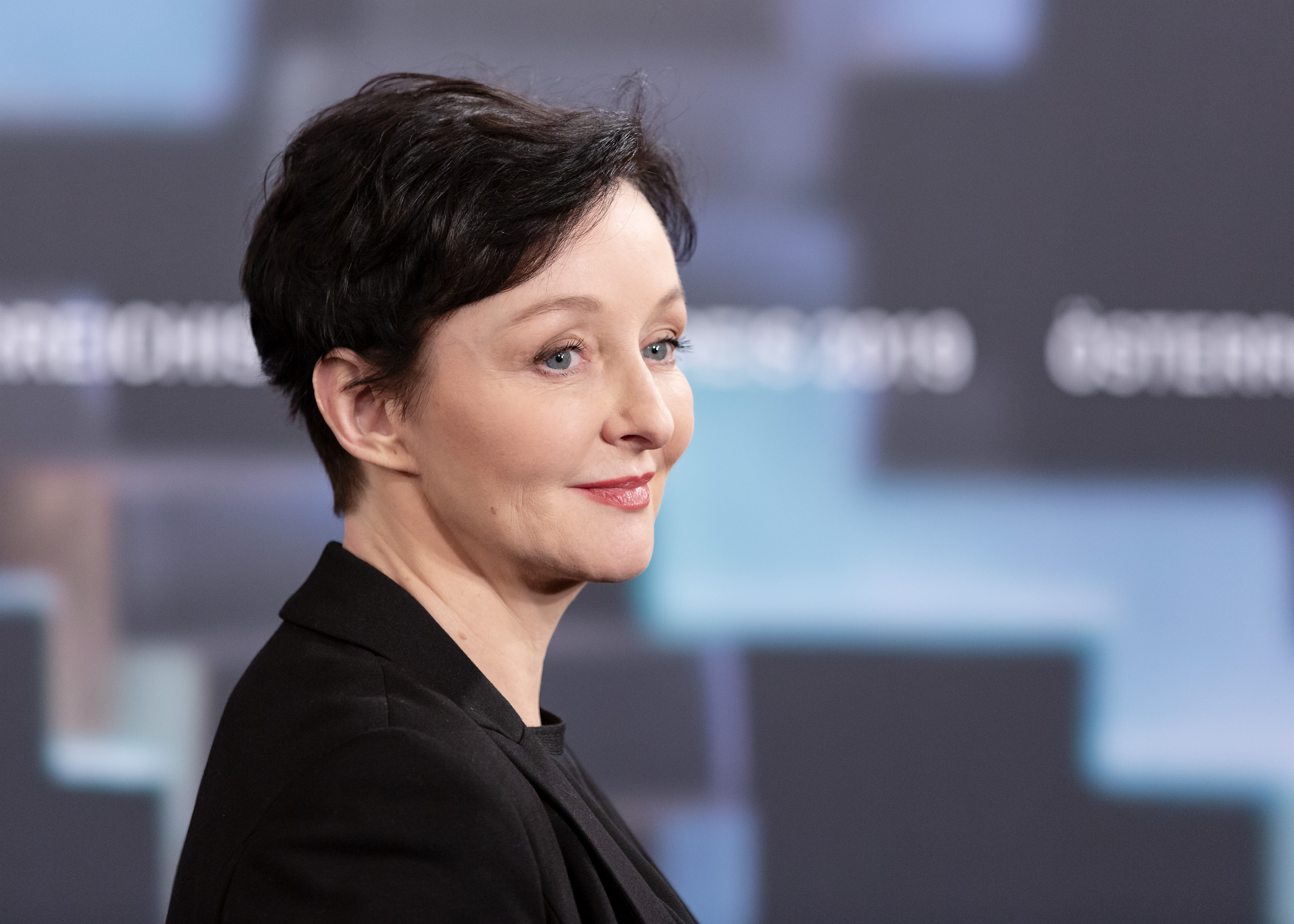
- Fritsch in 2019
- Born: 1964 (age 60–61); Hollabrunn, Lower Austria, Austria
- Occupation: Actress
- Spouse: Ulrich Reinthaller
- Children: 2, including Alina Fritsch

Regina Fritsch (born 1964) is an Austrian actress. She has been a member of the Burgtheater ensemble since 1985 and has been the holder of the Alma-Seidler-Ring since 2014.

== Life and career ==
Fritsch completed her acting training at the Krauss drama school in Vienna, after having worked for a short time as a truck driver. In 1985, she joined the ensemble of the Burgtheater, where she debuted with the Cäcilie in Nestroy's Freiheit in Krähwinkel. In addition to her stage work, she often plays in cinema and television productions. She portrayed the midwife in Joseph Vilsmaier's Brother of Sleep (1994) and worked in Erika Pluhar's Rosalinas Haus (1992) and Marafona (2001). She has two daughters from her divorced marriage with Ulrich Reinthaller. With her daughter, actress Alina Fritsch, she was already on stage together in Vienna (2014/15 to 2018/19). In 2019, Fritsch became professor at the Max Reinhardt Seminar.

== Awards ==
- 1992 O. E. Hasse Prize for best young actress
- 2007 Nestroy Theatre Prize, Best Supporting Role for her portrayal of Chantal in Maß für Maß
- 2008 Nestroy Theatre Prize, Best Actress for the role of Nawal in The Burns by Wajdi Mouawad
- 2014 Alma-Seidler-Ring
- 2015 Kammerschauspielerin
- 2021 Albin-Skoda-Ring
