= Theodor Döring =

German actor (1803–1878)

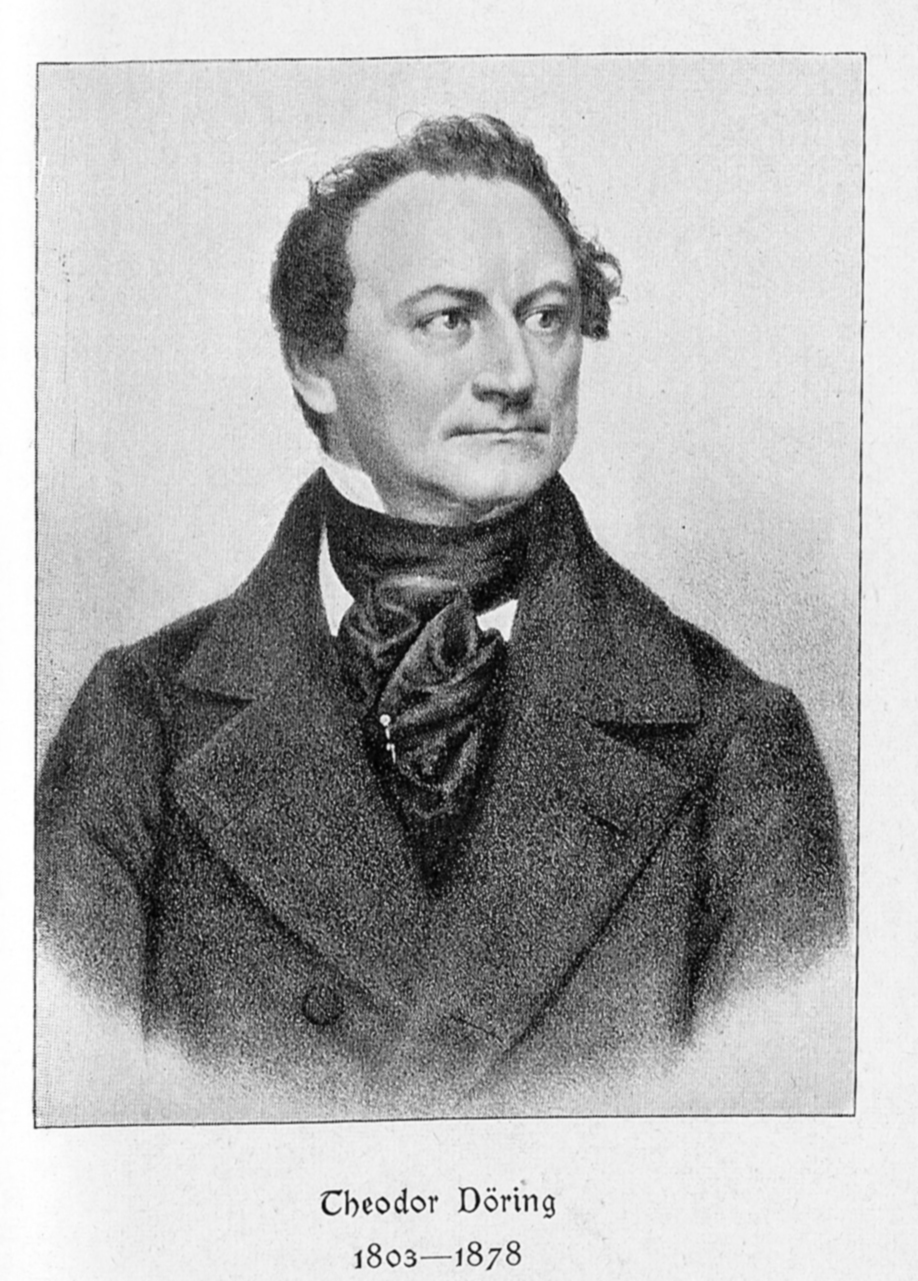

Theodor Döring (9 January 1803 – 17 August 1878) was a German actor.

Döring was born in Warsaw and settled with his family in 1807 in Prenzlau. He attended high school in Berlin. He found work as an actor, later working in Hamburg in 1834. He received a lifetime contract at the Berlin Hoftheater. He retired on 15 June 1878 and died one month later in Berlin.

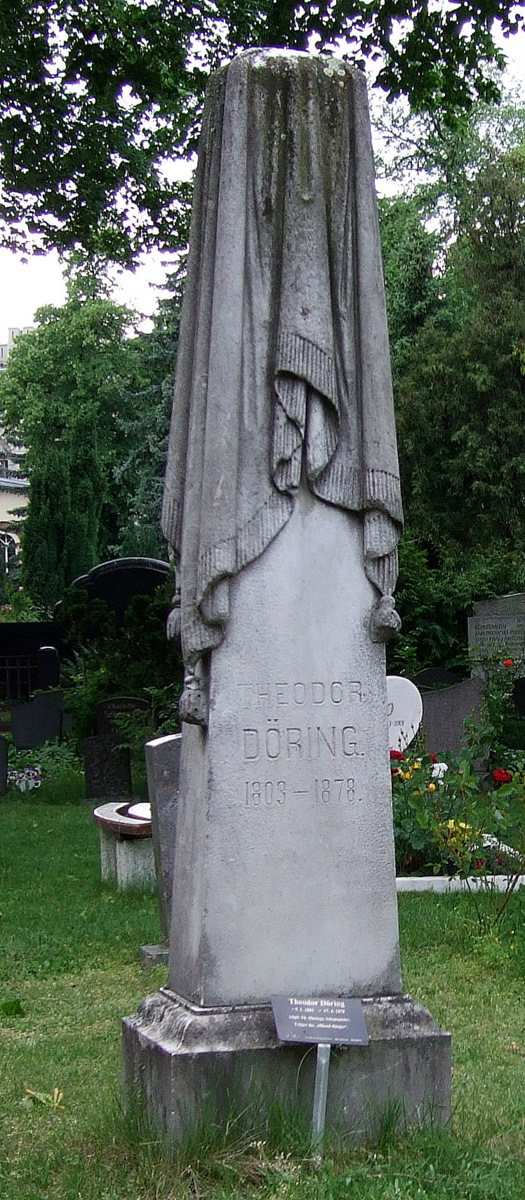
His tomb in Berlin

== Honors ==
Döring received the Iffland-Ring in 1872. Döringstrasse, a street located in Friedrichshain in Berlin, was named for him.
