= Otto Ebel von Sosen =

German musician, conductor and composer

Otto Ebel von Sosen (26 March 1899 – 6 February 1974) was a German musician, conductor and composer.

== Life ==
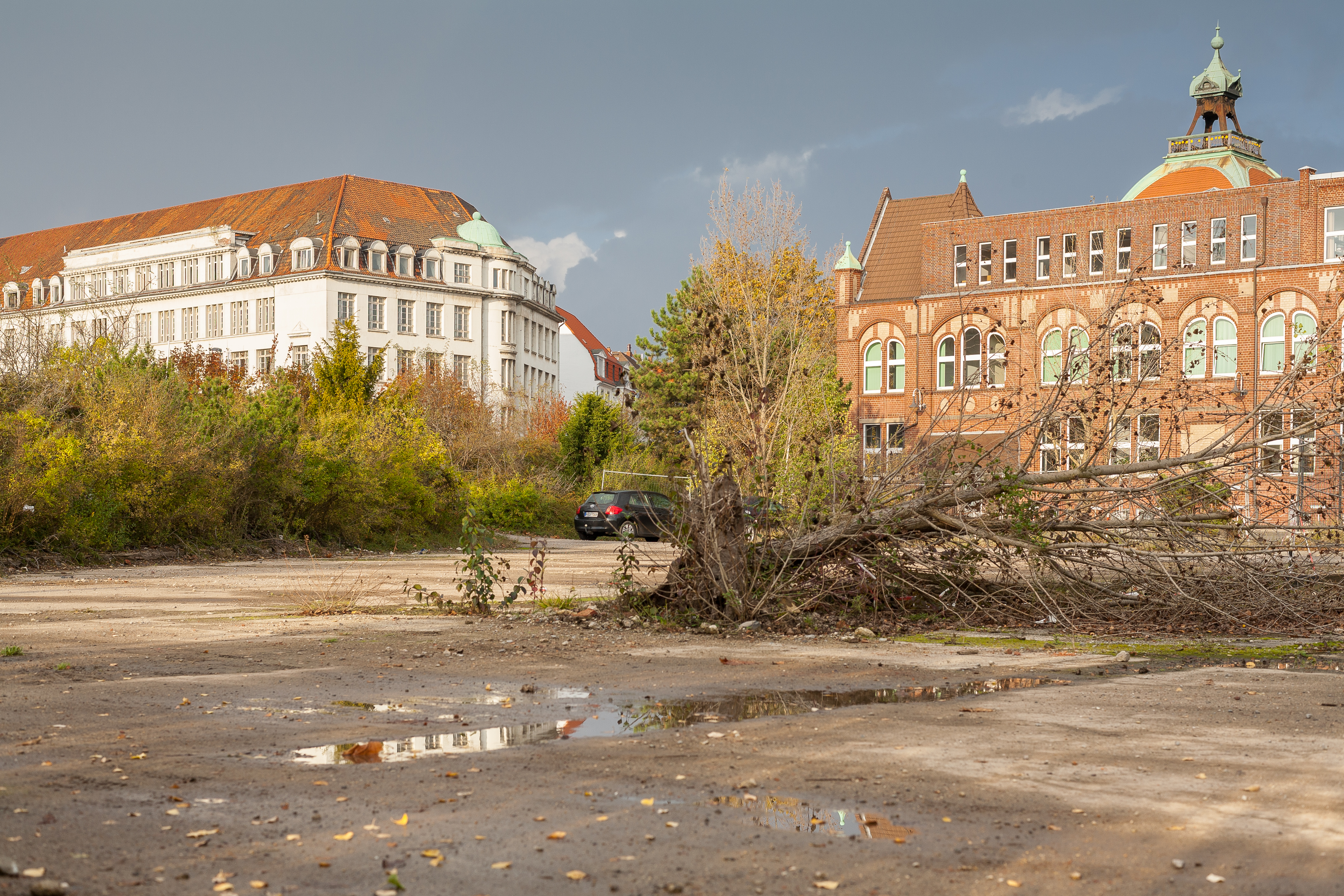
Der bis zur Bornumer Straße reichende ehemalige Verwaltungskomplex (links) der Hanomag, in dem Sosen 1926 als Direktor des NORAG-Nebensender Hannover tätig wurde

Born in Rendsburg, Sosen studied at the University of Music and Performing Arts Munich. From 1920, he worked as Kapellmeister at several small German Opera houses before he was called to Hanover on 1 April 1926 to work at the NORAG-Nebensender Hannover, which since its commissioning on 20 November 1924 was accommodated in the attic of the administrative building of Hanomag. On 16 December of the same year, and from there he was already active as conductor and as the first director of the institution. (Note: Deviating from this, Ebel von Sosen is also referred to as "Programmreferent"; compare for example Hugo Thielen: SOSEN, Otto Ebel von. In "Niedersächsisches Symphonie-Orchester", p. 339) As such, Sosen began to build up a Radio orchestra with initially only three, in 1927 already with 17 musicians. In the following year 1928, he founded and directed, at first under the name "Niedersächsisches Landesorchester", the later Niedersächsisches Symphonie-Orchester. Still at the time of the Weimar Republic, he had the orchestra from 1931 (Note: Deviating from this, 1932 is also mentioned as the first year of broadcasts of the Schlosskonzerte, see Hugo Thielen: Norddeutscher Rundfunk. In Stadtlexikon Hannover, p. 480f.) to broadcast over the radio on Mondays for more than a decade, initially from the Leineschloss.

After the Machtergreifung by the Nazis in 1933, personnel and structural changes were made at the Hanoverian broadcasting station, new station manager was now Harry Moss. Sosen was instead given full-time direction of the radio orchestra of the Reichssender Hamburg in 1934. With the beginning of the Second World War from September 1939 on, the own productions of the Hanoverian Norag subsidiary station were forbidden, but the Monday Castle Concerts Sosen were excluded from this, which were last broadcast from the Konzerthaus am Am Hohen Ufer, until these too had to be discontinued after the Bombing of Hanover in 1943.

Sosen, who wrote and composed numerous orchestral pieces, choral works, chamber music and songs, organized the Bad Pyrmont Concerts from 1955 to 1964 during the years of the Wirtschaftswunder of the Federal Republic of Germany.

Sosen died in Bad Pyrmont aged 74.

== Work ==
=== Composition ===
- Arioso im alten Stil für Klarinette und Streichorchester. Opus 15 (Collection Litolff, Nr. 5501 : 1.50) (reprint, for clarinet in A with piano; head part also in English and French), Leipzig: Edition Peters; Leipzig: Litolff, 1958
- Deutsches Interludium. Opus 7, Leipzig, London, New York: Edition Peters Group
- Abendlied. Für Salonorchester, Leipzig, London, New York: Edition Peters Group

=== Publications ===
- Pyrmont. Kleines Brevier eines Weltbades. Holzminden: Weserlandverlag, 1953
- Femmes compositeurs de musique. Dictionnaire biographique. Paris, Rosier 1910 (?)

== See also ==
- Gottbegnadeten list.
