= Karl August Devrient =

German actor (1797–1872)

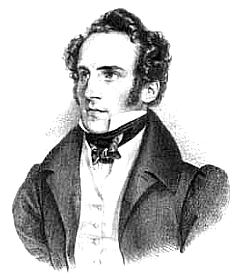
Karl August Devrient, c. 1825

Karl August Devrient (5 April 1797 – 3 August 1872) was a German stage actor best known for performances of Schiller and Shakespeare. He was related to other notable German actors, including:

- his uncle Ludwig;
- his brothers Philipp Eduard and Gustav Emil;
- his wife, operatic soprano Wilhelmine Schröder-Devrient;
- his sons, Friedrich and Max;
- his nephew, Otto.

There is a collection relating to his life at the Österreichisches Theatermuseum.

== Biography ==
Born Carl De Vrient in Berlin, prior to his acting life, he was a cavalry officer. He fought with the Hussars against Napoleon at Waterloo. He died in Bad Lauterberg in 1872, aged 75.

Devrient had his acting debut in 1819 in Braunschweig. In 1821, he received an engagement at the court theatre in Dresden, where, in 1823, he married Wilhelmine. In 1835 he joined the company at Karlsruhe, and in 1839 that at Hanover. His best-known roles were Schiller's Wallenstein, Goethe's Faust, and Shakespeare's King Lear.
