= Emil Devrient =

19th century German actor and opera singer

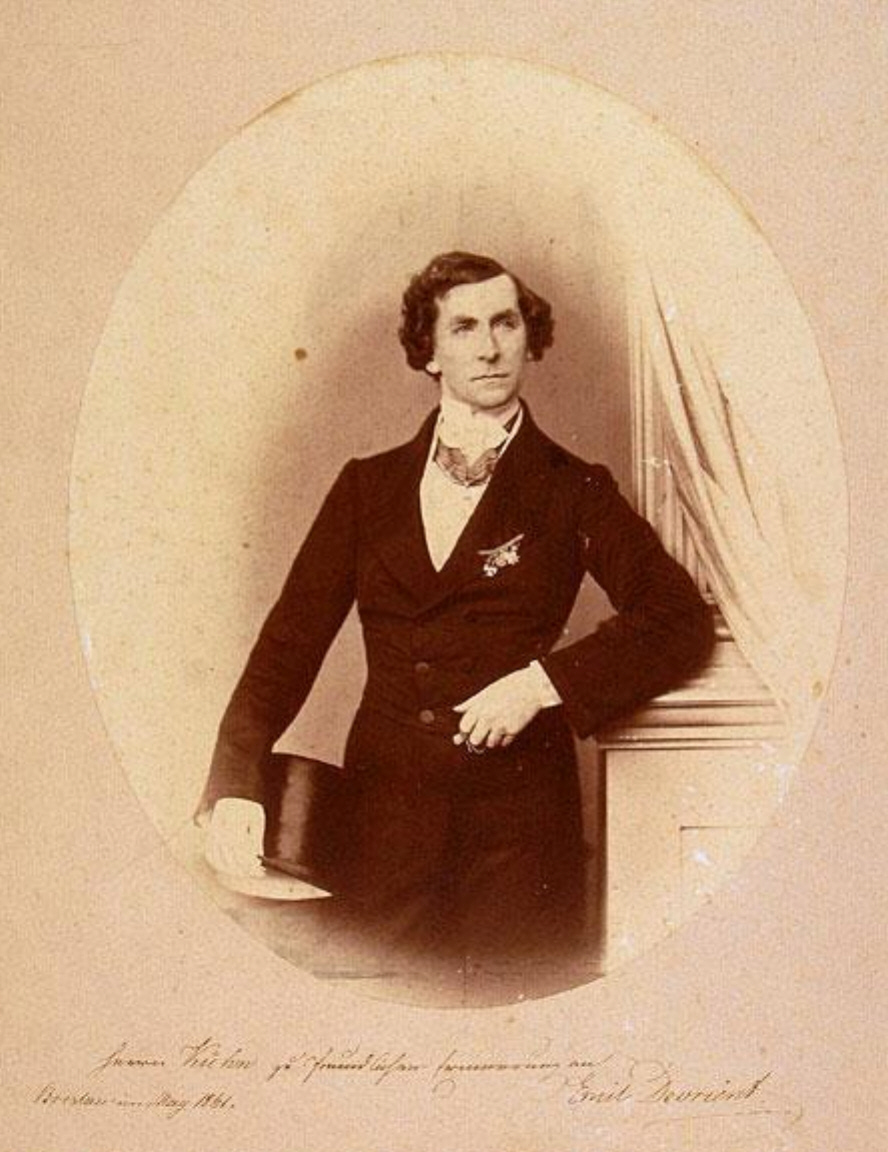
Gustav Emil Devrient, 1861

Gustav Emil Devrient (4 September 1803, Berlin – 7 August 1872, Dresden) was a German actor and an occasional operatic bass.

== Life ==
Gustav Emil Devrient was the youngest son of the six children of the silk merchant Tobias Philipp Devrient and his wife Marie Charlotte. The actors Karl August Devrient (1797–1872) and Eduard Devrient (1801–1877) were his brothers, the actor Ludwig Devrient (1784–1832) was his uncle and the actors Max Devrient (1857–1929) and Otto Devrient (1838–1894) were his nephews. The opera singer Wilhelmine Schröder-Devrient was his sister-in-law by her marriage to Karl August.

As a youth, Devrient entered an apprenticeship in his uncle's chemical factory in Zwickau, but soon followed his brothers to the theatre. His stage debut was in 1821 as Raoul in Schiller's The Maid of Orléans in Braunschweig. In 1822 he move to the theatre in Bremen where he sang bass roles in operas and played the "youthful lover" in plays, a role he played until the end of his career. The next year he appeared in Dresden as Kaspar in Der Freischütz, conducted by its composer Carl Maria von Weber.

When in 1824 he gained an engagement in Leipzig, Devrient became a full-time actor. There, he met his later wife, the actress Doris (or Dorothea) Böhler (1805–1882); they divorced after a 17-year marriage in 1842 and their four children were put into his custody. His daughter Marie (born 1826) also became an actress. When the Leipzig theatre was closed, he moved in 1828 to Magdeburg, and in 1829 to Hamburg. He completed his theatrical education there and moved to the Dresden Hofbühne (Court Theatre) in 1830. He worked there for 38 years until he retired on 1 May 1868, in order, as he put it, "not to outlive himself as an artist." Throughout his career, he toured widely and to great acclaim in Germany and Europe, e.g. to Paris and twice (1852 and 1853) to London.

Devrient was famous for his roles as Marquis Posa in Schiller's Don Carlos, as Hamlet, and as Goethe's Egmont and Torquato Tasso, which he also performed in his last stage appearance. Devrient died in Dresden and was buried at the Alter Annenfriedhof in the Dresden suburb of Südvorstadt, but the grave is lost.

== Honours ==
Devrient was the first actor to receive the Knight's Cross of the Saxonian Civil Order and was made a Court Councillor (Hofrat). From 1832 until his death in 1872 he was the second holder of the Iffland-Ring. The Saxonian Court Theatre made him an honorary member and had a special commemorative medaillon designed for the occasion of his retirement in 1868. A street near the city centre of Dresden is named after him.
