= Ludwig Devrient =

German actor (1784–1832)

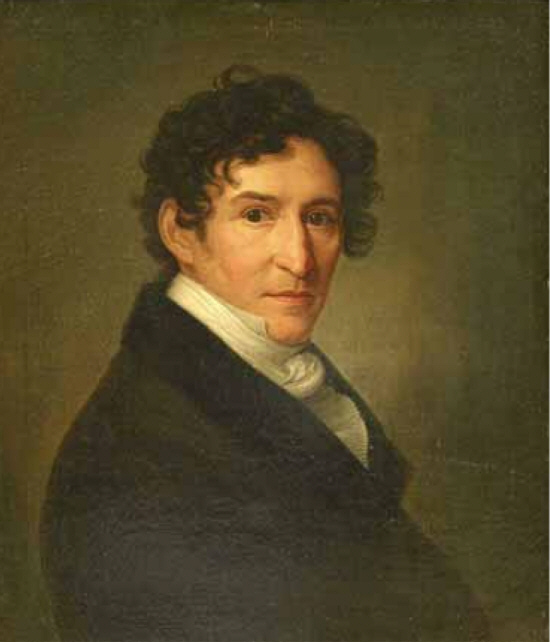
Ludwig Devrient (1831), by Christoph Wilhelm Wohlien

Ludwig Devrient (15 December 1784 – 30 December 1832) was a German actor, noted for his playing in the works of Shakespeare and Schiller.

Devrient, who was born in Berlin, left a commercial career for the stage in 1804. He joined a travelling theatrical company, and made his first appearance on the stage at Gera as the messenger in Schiller's Braut von Messina. By the interest of Count Brühl, he appeared at Rudolstadt as Franz Moor in Schiller's Die Räuber, so successfully that he obtained a permanent engagement at the ducal theatre in Dessau, where he played until 1809. He then received a call to Breslau, where he remained for six years. Such was his success in the title-parts of several of Shakespeare's plays, that the leading actor August Wilhelm Iffland began to fear for his own reputation; yet that artist was generous enough to recommend the young actor as his only possible successor. On Iffland's death, Devrient was summoned to Berlin, where he was for fifteen years the popular idol. He died there in December 1832.

Ludwig Devrient was equally adept in comedy and tragedy. Falstaff, Franz Moor (in Die Räuber), Shylock, King Lear and Richard II were among his best parts. Karl von Holtei in his Reminiscences gave a graphic picture of him and the "demoniac fascination" of his acting. He also wrote several plays and a history of the German stage (1848–74) in five volumes. With his son, Otto, he published translations of Shakespeare's plays.

Devrient was a member of a notable theatrical family, his three nephews all being actors. Karl August Devrient (1797–1872) was popular in heroic and character roles such as Lear, Shylock, and Faust. Another nephew, Eduard Devrient (1801–1877), directed the Court Theatre, Dresden (1844–46), and the Karlsruhe Theatre (1852–70). Gustav Emil Devrient (1803–1872), was the youngest and most gifted of all three nephews of Ludwig Devrient.
