= Wilhelm Stieber =

Prussian spymaster and police chief (1818–1882)

Wilhelm Johann Carl Eduard Stieber (3 May 1818 – 29 January 1882) was Otto von Bismarck's master spy and director of the Prussian Feldgendarmerie. Stieber was both an agent of domestic surveillance and an external agent. Along with Joseph Fouché, he invented modern information gathering.

== Biography ==
According to his questionable memoirs, Stieber was born in Merseburg, Prussian Saxony. His parents were Hypolith Stieber, a minor government official who later entered the Lutheran ministry, and Daisy Cromwell, an English noblewoman. He began studying German law at Friedrich Wilhelm University in Berlin against the wishes of his father, who desired a career for him in the Prussian Church. He was then employed in 1841 in a criminal court. When his father learned that he was studying law, he ended all funding towards his education.

In order to earn his tuition, young Stieber began working for the Berlin Police. Finding this much more exciting than law, he obtained a promotion to Inspector of Division IV, the Criminal Division. After the Revolution of 1848, he was promoted by King Frederick William IV of Prussia to chief of police. During the winter of 1850, he was ordered to investigate an exiled political extremist named Karl Marx.

His unreliable memoirs claim that, posing as a doctor, he bluffed his way into Marx's London household and stole the membership listings of Marx's Communist League. The information in the files was sent to France and also to several German states. Many of Marx's associates were then sentenced to long prison terms. Stieber's memoirs also describe his involvement with matters embarrassing to the House of Hohenzollern. He refers to an occasion when a Greek swindler named Constantine Simonides tricked the Berlin Academy of Science out of 5,000 talers with a forged ancient Greek manuscript. As the money had come from the king's private purse, Stieber was ordered to get it back as discreetly as possible. Using an elderly circus performer as an interpreter, Stieber forced Simonides to return the money by threatening to hand him over to the notoriously brutal Greek police. With the money secured, Simonides was escorted to the border and ordered never to return to Prussia.

Stieber also investigated a counterfeiting gang in the Rhineland and insider trading on the Berlin Stock Exchange. He also became something of an expert on the prostitution trade in Berlin and recruited many of its denizens as informants.

He died in Berlin.

A more reliable biography of the life of Stieber is Memorabilia Of The Privy Councillor Dr. Stieber Edited From His Papers (1883) by the reputable historian and jurist Dr. Leopold Auerbach.

== In popular culture ==
- Stieber and his espionage against Napoleon III's France is the focus of episode 1 of the 1955 American television series I Spy
- Stieber appears as a character in the novel The Prague Cemetery by Umberto Eco.

== Works ==
- Die Prostitution in Berlin und ihre Opfer in historischer, sittlicher, medizinischer und polizeilicher Beziehung beleuchtet. Hofmann, Berlin 1846 (English: Prostitution in Berlin and Its Victims)
- Der erste politische Prozeß vor den Geschwornen Berlins, betreffend die Anklage des Ober-Staatsanwalts Sethe wider den Literaten Robert Springer wegen Majestätsbeleidigung : nach stenographischen Berichten dargest. vom Vertheidiger des Angeklagten. Robert Springer, Berlin 1849
- Carl Georg Ludwig Wermuth / Stieber: Die Communistischen -Verschwörungen des neunzehnten Jahrhunderts. Im amtlichen Auftrag zur Benutzung der Polizei-behörden der sämmtlichen deutschen bundesstaaten. Erster Theil. Enthaltend: Die historische Darstellung der betreffenden Untersuchungen. Druck von A. W. Hayn, Berlin 1853 (Reprint: Olms, Hildesheim 1969 und Verlag Klaus Guhl, Berlin 1976)
- Carl Georg Ludwig Wermuth / Stieber: Die Communistischen -Verschwörungen des neunzehnten Jahrhunderts. Im amtlichen Auftrag zur Benutzung der Polizei-behörden der sämmtlichen deutschen bundesstaaten. Zweiter Theil. Enthaltend: Die Personalien der in den Communisten-untersuchungen vorkommenden Personen. Druck von A. W. Hayn, Berlin 1854 (Reprint: Olms, Hildesheim 1969 und Verlag Klaus Guhl, Berlin 1976) [online] Available at: https://www.digitale-sammlungen.de/de/view/bsb10771201?page=11 [Accessed 8 Oct. 2014].
- With Carl Georg Ludwig Wermuth: Die Communisten-Verschwörungen des neunzehnten Jahrhunderts, ASIN: B0000BU4N6 (English: Communist Conspiracies of the Nineteenth Century)
- Practisches Lehrbuch der Criminal-Polizei. Auf Grund eigener langjähriger Erfahrungen zur amtlichen Benutzung für Justiz- und Polizeibeamte und zur Warnung und Belehrung für das Publikum bearb. von Wilhelm Stieber. Hayn, Berlin 1860 (Reprint: Kriminalistik-Verlag, Heidelberg 1983)
- Wilhelm J. C. E. Stieber: Spion des Kanzlers. Die Enthüllungen von Bismarcks Geheimdienstchef. Seewald, Stuttgart 1978, ISBN 3-512-00518-7 (dtv, München 1978 ISBN 3-512-00518-7) (English: The Chancellor's Spy. Memoirs of the Founder of Modern Espionage. Translated from the German by Jan Van Heurch, Grove Press, New York 1979)

== See also ==
- Prussian Secret Police

== Literature ==
- Karl Bittel: Der Kommunistenprozeß zu Köln 1852 im Spiegel der zeitgenössischen Presse. Hrsg. und eingeleitet. Rütten & Loening, Berlin 1955
- Binder, Manfred (2010). Dr. Wilhelm Stieber, Der preußisch loyale Staatsagent; Feldpolizeidirektor & Geheimdienstchef Fürst Bismarcks und seine Denkwürdigkeiten. Norderstedt: Books on Demand.
- Hilmar-Detlef Brückner: Wilhelm Stieber (1818–2018) oder wie sich alternative Wirklichkeit durchsetzt. Eine Fallstudie. Hamburg tradition, 2018
- Thomas Diembach: "Das kann doch nicht wahr sein! Zur Authentizität der Memoiren von Bismarcks Geheimdienstchef Wilhelm Stieber". In: Themen juristischer Zeitgeschichte 2. Recht und Juristen in der deutschen Revolution 1848–49. Nomos, Baden-Baden 1998, s. 236–243 ISBN 3-7890-5676-6
- Rudolf Herrnstadt: Die erste Verschwörung gegen das internationale Proletariat. Zur Geschichte des Kölner Kommunistenprozesses 1852. Rütten & Loening 1958
- Karl Marx: Enthüllungen über den Kommunisten-Prozeß zu Köln. Boston 1853
- Wilhelm J. C. E. Stieber: Spion des Kanzlers. Die Enthüllungen von Bismarcks Geheimdienstchef. Seewald, Stuttgart 1978, ISBN 3-512-00518-7 (dtv, München 1978 ISBN 3-512-00518-7) (English: The Chancellor's Spy. Memoirs of the Founder of Modern Espionage. Translated from the German by Jan Van Heurch, Grove Press, New York 1979)
- Denkwürdigkeiten des Geheimen Regierungsrathes Dr. Stieber. Aus seinen hinterlassenen Papieren bearbeitet von Dr. Leopold Auerbach. Engelmann, Berlin 1884 (English: Memorabilia of the Privy Councillor Dr. Stieber)
