= August Wilhelm Iffland =

German actor and author (1759–1814)

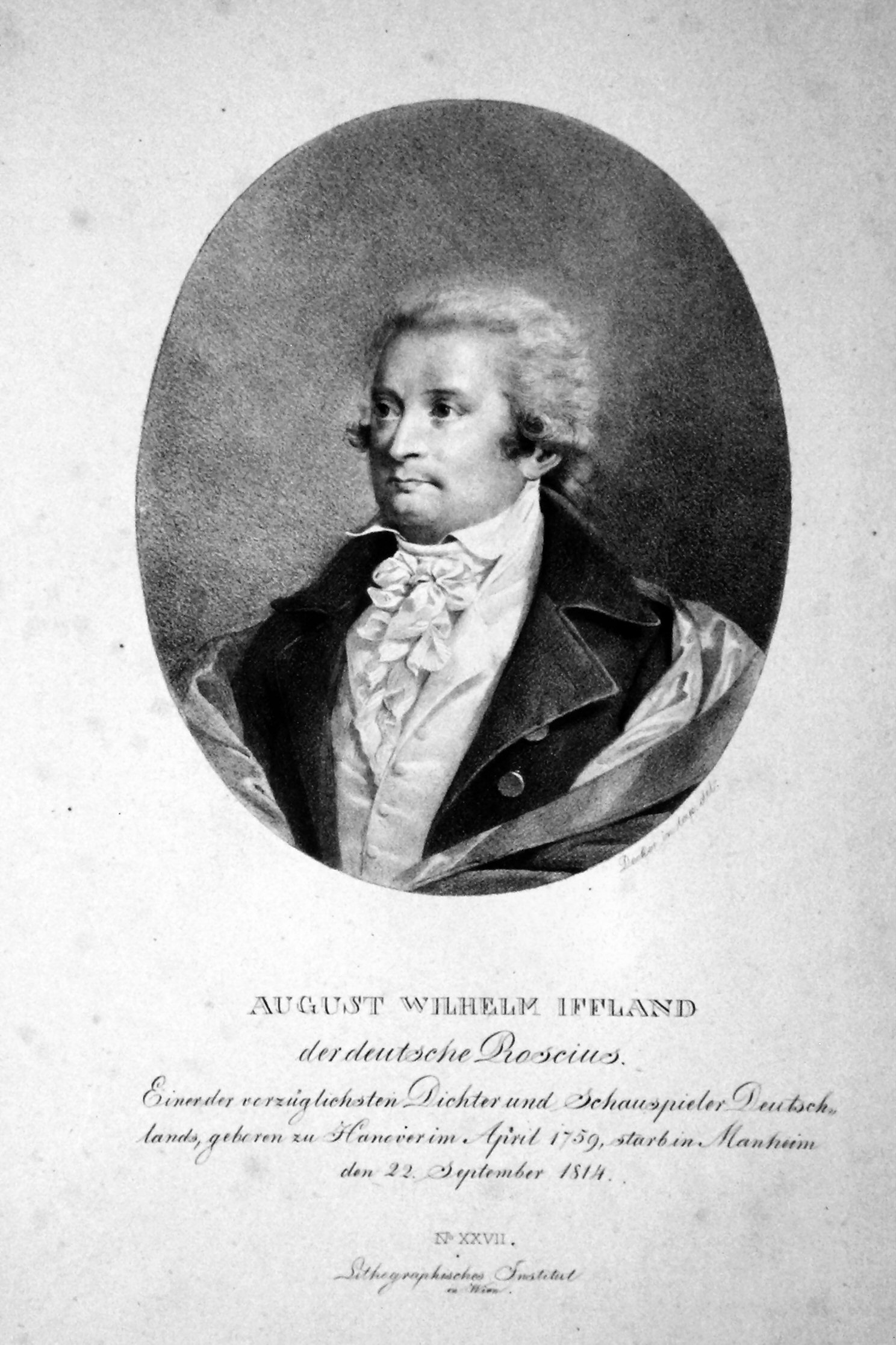
- A lithograph of Iffland by Johann Stephan Decker, c. 1825
- Born: 19 April 1759; Hanover, Electorate of Hanover, Kingdom of Great Britain
- Died: 22 September 1814 (aged 55); Berlin
- Occupation: Thespian
- Parents: Johann Rudolf Iffland (father); Carolina Schröder (mother)

Signature
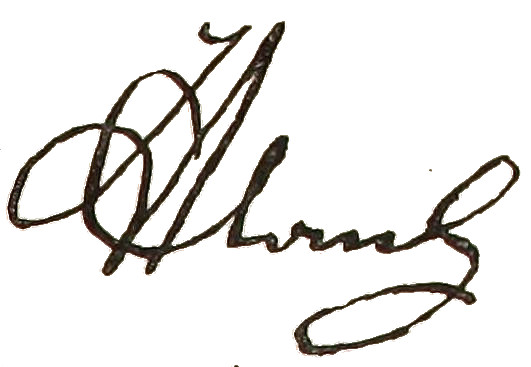

August Wilhelm Iffland (19 April 1759 – 22 September 1814) was a German actor and dramatic author.

== Life ==
Born in Hanover, his father intended him to be a clergyman, but Iffland preferred the stage, and at eighteen ran away to Gotha in order to prepare himself for a theatrical career.

He received instruction from Hans Ekhof, and made such rapid progress that he was able to accept an engagement at the theater in Mannheim in 1779, beginning his rise into prominence. In Mannheim, he played the lead role Franz Moor in the acclaimed premiere of Friedrich Schiller's The Robbers in 1782. He soon stood high in his profession, and enhanced his reputation by frequently playing in other towns. In 1796 he settled in Berlin, where he became director of the national theater of Prussia, and in 1811 he was made general director of all presentations before royalty.

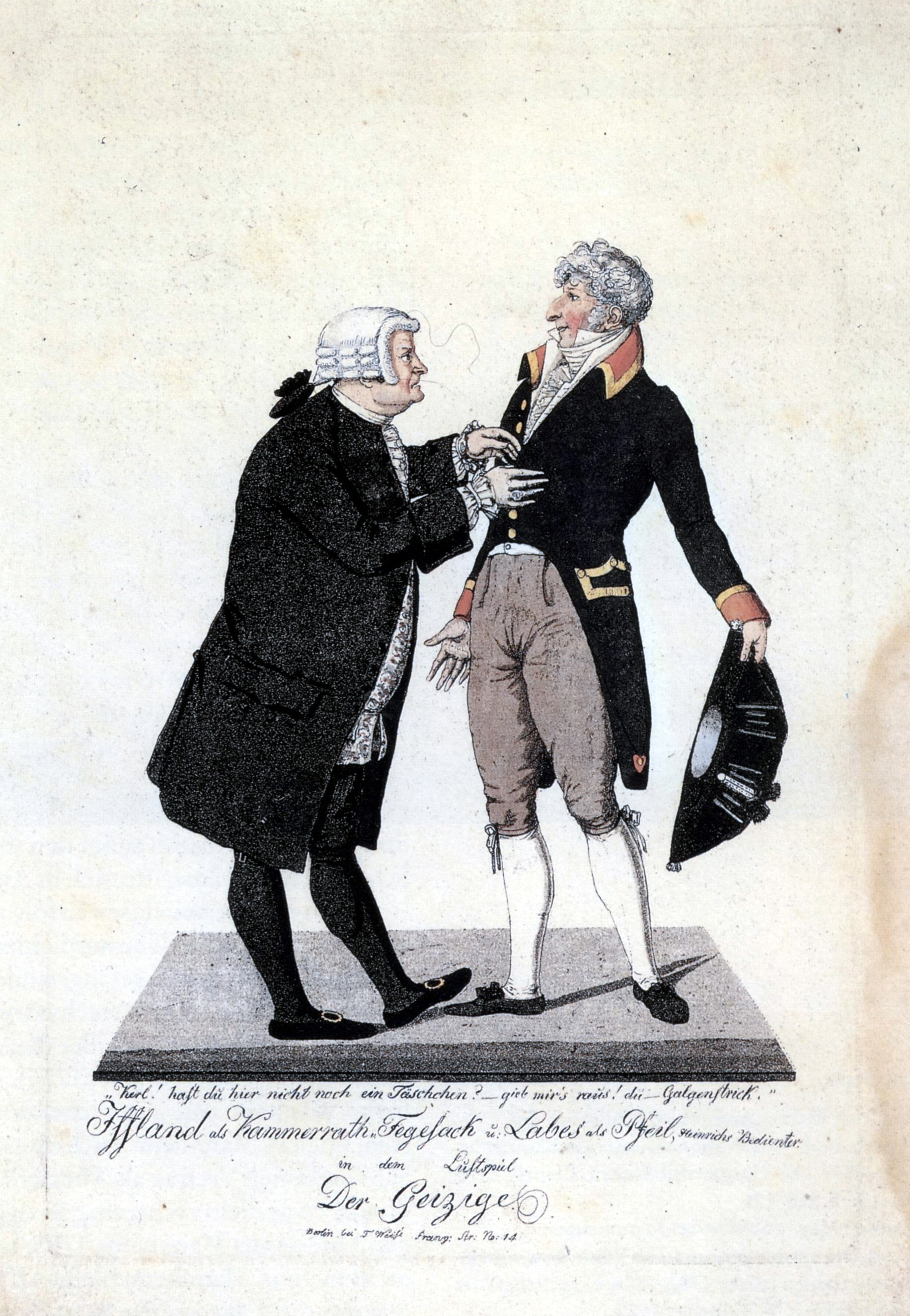
Iffland and Franz Labes in Molière's The Miser, Berlin, c. 1810

Iffland produced the then contemporary, now classical works of Goethe and Schiller with conscientious care, but he had little understanding for the drama of the romantic writers. As an actor, he was conspicuous for his comedy parts: fine gentlemen, polished men of the world, and distinguished princes.

Iffland died in Berlin on 22 September 1814. He is buried in the Jerusalems- und Neue Kirche Friedhof II (Cemetery No. II of the Jerusalem's Church and New Church) in Berlin-Kreuzberg. A bronze portrait statue of him was erected in front of the Mannheim theater in 1864. A street in Berlin is named after him.

The Iffland-Ring bears Iffland's likeness, and is borne by the most important German-speaking actor, as decided by his predecessor.

== Works ==
Iffland specialized in domestic dramas depicting everyday life. His works display a thorough mastery of the technical necessities of the stage, and a remarkable power of devising effective situations.

His best-known plays are Die Jäger, Dienstpflicht, Die Advokaten, Die Mündel and Die Hagstolzen. Iffland was also a dramatic critic, and German actors placed high value on his reasonings and hints about their works in his Almanach für Theater und Theaterfreunde. During 1798–1802 he issued his Dramatischen Werke in sixteen volumes, to which he added an autobiography (Meine theatralische Laufbahn). During 1807–1809 Iffland put out two volumes of Neue dramatische Werke. Selections from his writings were later published, one in two volumes, the other in ten volumes.
