= Eduard Devrient =

German opera singer

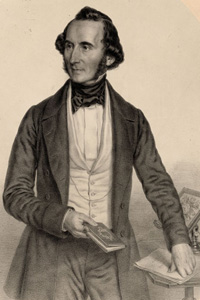

(Philipp) Eduard Devrient (11 August 1801 – 4 October 1877) was a German baritone, librettist, playwright, actor, theatre director, and theatre reformer and historian.

Devrient came from a theatrical family. His uncle was Ludwig Devrient and his brother Karl was the first husband of Wilhelmine Schröder-Devrient.

He was born and studied in Berlin and performed in a number of German opera houses between 1819 and 1834, when he lost his singing voice and turned his attention to writing and acting. From 1844-6 he worked in Dresden as actor/director, and he directed the Hoftheater in Karlsruhe from 1852 until his retirement in 1870.

As a singer, he performed in works by Gluck, Mozart, Beethoven and Weber, among others, and sang in the première of Marschner's Hans Heiling (in the title-role; Devrient also wrote its libretto). He also sang in the 1831 Berlin premiere of Der Templer und die Jüdin (as Bois-Guilbert).

He also took the part of Christ in the 1829 revival by his friend Felix Mendelssohn of J. S. Bach's St Matthew Passion, having previously sung the role of Carrasco in Mendelssohn's only publicly performed opera, Die Hochzeit des Camacho (1827).

He wrote a number of plays and two other opera librettos, Die Kirmes and Der Zigeuner, both set by Wilhelm Taubert. In Karlsruhe, in the course of seventeen years, he not only raised it to a high position, but enriched its repertory by many noteworthy librettos. But his chief work is his history of the German stage, Geschichte der deutschen Schauspielkunst (Leipzig, 1848-1874).

Eduard Devrient died in Karlsruhe. His son Otto Devrient also worked in the theatre.

== Sources ==
- Sadie, Stanley, ed. (1992). The New Grove Dictionary of Opera. Oxford: Oxford University Press. ISBN 978-0-19-522186-2.
- Warrack, John, and Ewan West (1992). The Oxford Dictionary of Opera. Oxford: Oxford University Press. ISBN 0-19-869164-5.
