= Otto Devrient =

German actor and playwright

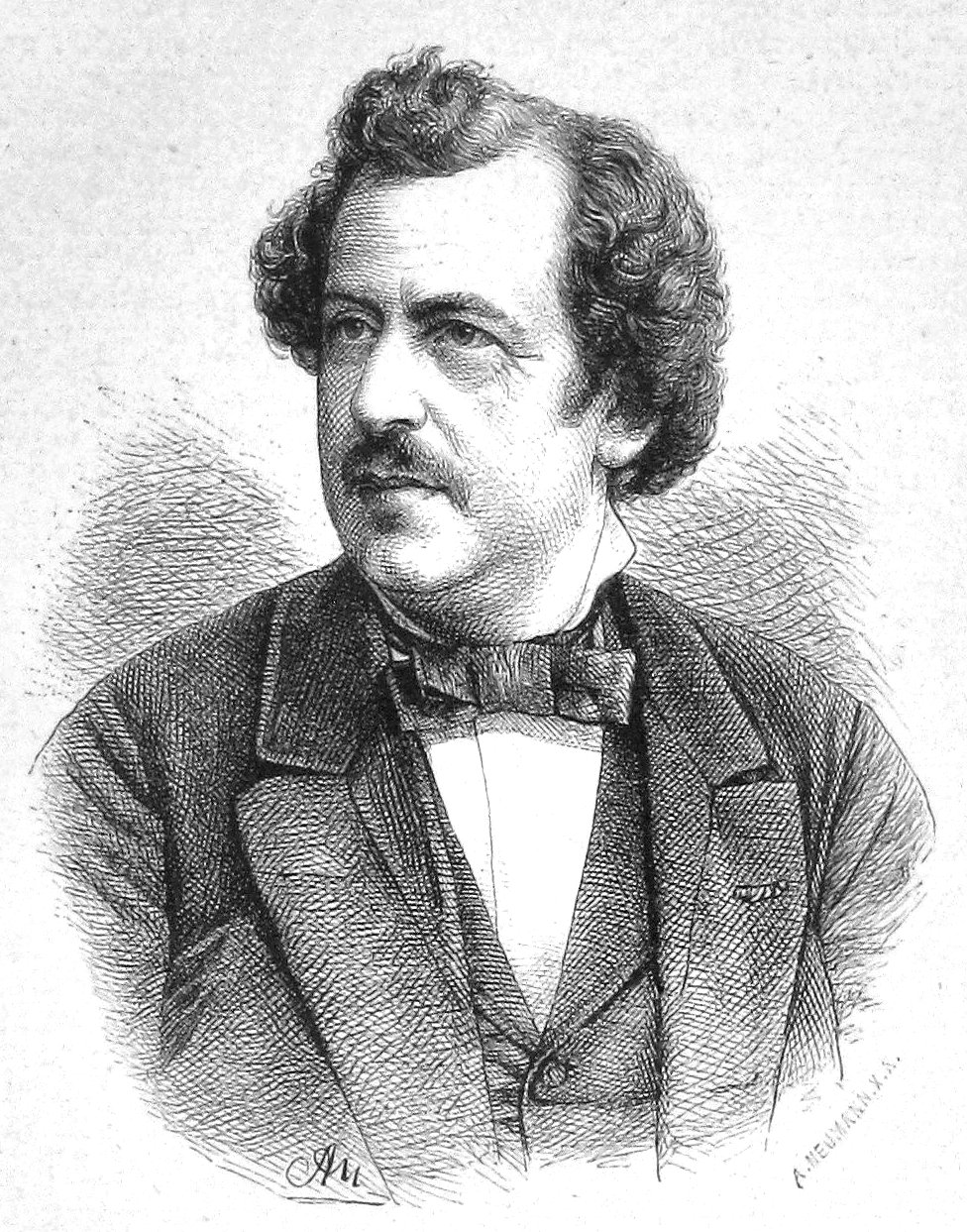
Otto Devrient.

Otto Devrient (born 3 October 1838 in Berlin; † 23 June 1894 in Stettin) was a German actor and playwright.

Devrient was the son of Philipp Eduard Devrient. He first went on stage in 1856, training in Stuttgart, Berlin and Leipzig. In 1863, he entered the Hoftheater in Karlsruhe, and moved to the Hoftheater in Weimar in 1873 as character role actor and director.

There, he made an impression with his staging of Goethes Faust. In 1876, he became chief director of the Hoftheater in Mannheim, in 1877 intendant of the new municipal theatre in Frankfurt, and after a tour through Berlin, Cologne, and Düsseldorf, he settled in Jena, where he received a PhD h.c.. In 1884, he became director of the Hoftheater in Oldenburg.

== Works ==
- Zwei Shakespeare-Vorträge (Karlsruhe 1869)
- Zwei Könige (Karlsruhe 1867)
- Tiberius Gracchus (Karlsruhe 1871)
- Kaiser Rotbart (Karlsruhe 1871)
- Was wir bieten (Weimar 1873)
- Briefe Ifflands und Schröders an den Schauspieler Werdy (Frankfurt 1881)
- Das Freudenspiel am Hofe Ernst des Frommen
