= Prinsep =

Notable British family

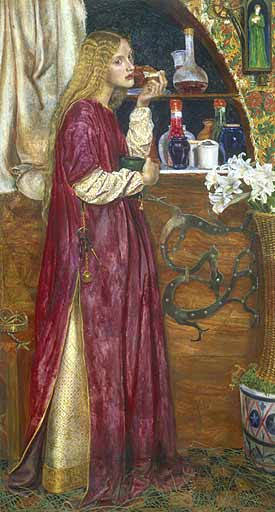
The Queen was in the Parlour, Eating Bread and Honey, 1860 by Valentine Cameron 'Val' Prinsep

Prinsep may mean any of several notable members of the British Prinsep family.

The family descended from John Prinsep, an 18th-century merchant who was the son of Rev. John Prinsep, rector of Saundby, Nottinghamshire, and Bicester, Oxfordshire. John Prinsep, his son, founded indigo production in India as well as the making of cotton fabrics in Bengal, opened a copper mint in India and was a founder of the Westminster Life Insurance Society in London, where he later served as Alderman and in Parliament. Prinsep arrived in India as a soldier in the army of the East India Company but became a merchant soon afterwards. During his 16 years in India, John Prinsep amassed a £40,000 fortune, which he used to set himself up as a London businessman and get himself elected to Parliament. Prinsep made two large fortunes and lost both. He was the first of three succeeding generations of Prinseps in India, all of whom were known for their artistic abilities. Among his descendants are the artist Valentine Cameron Prinsep, the Anglo-Indian antiquarian, scholar and architect James Prinsep.

== Prinsep family members ==
A partial listing of Prinsep family members:

- Augustus Prinsep (1803–1830), eighth and youngest son of John Prinsep, sketcher, writer, civil servant, born in London, attended Haileybury College, then clerk with East India Company, Calcutta, attempted to settle in Australia but, unsuccessful, died aboard ship
- Charles Robert Prinsep (1789–1864), Lincoln's Inn barrister and economist, graduate of St John's College, Cambridge, Judge Advocate General of Bengal, resided at Belvedere Estate, Calcutta, son of patriarch John Prinsep
- Charles Robert Prinsep, Singapore merchant for whom Singapore's Prinsep Street and Prinsep Place are named, owner of the Prinsep nutmeg plantation, 6,700 nutmeg shrubs covering much of what is now downtown Singapore
- Edward Augustus Prinsep, (1828–1900), Calcutta merchant, son of William Prinsep of Calcutta
- Lieut. Frederick Bruce Prinsep (d. 1879), soldier, 21st Hussars, 3rd European Light Cavalry, decorated for his role in the Indian Rebellion of 1857
- George Augustus Prinsep Esq., (d. 1839) prominent Anglo-Indian journalist, cotton merchant, salt manufacturer, shipping owner, Calcutta, member, Royal Asiatic Society of Bengal, assumed editorship of The Courier newspaper of Calcutta after failure of early business venture, publisher Calcutta Gazette, regained fortune through salt interests, son of merchant John Prinsep
- George Levett-Prinsep, Norfolk Crescent, London

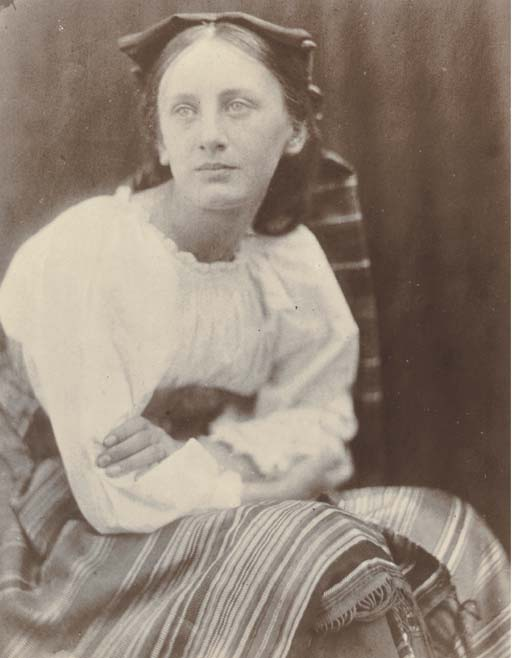
'May' Prinsep, daughter of Charles Robert Prinsep. Photographed by Julia Margaret Cameron, 1866

- Henry Charles Prinsep (1844–1922), manager of family estates in Western Australia, civil servant, Chief Protector of Aborigines, artist, son of Charles Robert Prinsep, and brother of 'May' Prinsep (who married Hallam Tennyson, elder son of Alfred, Lord Tennyson), born in Calcutta, died in Busselton, Western Australia, home of his wife Josephine Bussell's family
- Lt. Col. Henry Auriol Prinsep (1836–1914), soldier, Bengal Staff Corps, his daughter Mary married Hon. William Fitzwilliam James Dundas
- James Prinsep (1799–1840), numismatist, linguist, artist, scholar, Secretary of the Asiatic Society, son of John Prinsep, brother of Henry Thoby Prinsep and William Prinsep (executor of his estate), died at sea returning to England, 1840
- Henry Thoby Prinsep (1793–1878), merchant and civil servant, Bengal Civil Service, named director of East India Company 1849, served on the Council of India 1858–1874, son of patriarch John Prinsep, lived at Little Holland House, Kensington, London, one of London's sought-after salons of the age, and The Briary, Isle of Wight, amateur oil painter, married in 1835 to Sarah Monckton Pattle (Calcutta, 1816–Brighton, 1887), and brother-in-law of photographer Julia Margaret Cameron
- Sir Henry Thoby Prinsep (1836–1914), judge of the High Court, Calcutta
- Arthur Thoby Haverleigh Prinsep (1862–1938), Sir Henry Thoby's son, Australian and New Zealand-based author, actor, poet, journalist and footballer. Wrote under the name F. D'A. C. De L'Isle. He is also the father of Gordon De Lisle.
- John Prinsep, vicar's son, patriarch of the Prinsep family in India, indigo planter, entrepreneur, arrived in India a few weeks after Warren Hastings became Governor General in 1773, amassed a large fortune in indigo production, retired to frescoed mansion on London's Leadenhall Street later occupied by the India Office, London alderman, Member of Parliament
- James Hunter Prinsep, Bengal Civil Service
- James F. M. Prinsep (1861–1895), footballer, was the grandson of Henry's brother, William.
- Thomas Prinsep (1800–1830), engineer, amateur artist, Calcutta, India, younger brother of James Prinsep
- Thomas Prinsep of Croxall Hall, Derbyshire, High Sheriff of Derbyshire 1802, former India merchant, artist, cattle breeder, son of patriarch John
- Thomas Levett-Prinsep, heir to his uncle Thomas Prinsep and son of Theophilus Levett of Wychnor Park Derbyshire. On the early death of Prinsep, his seat at Croxall Hall, Derbyshire, devolved onto his nephew Levett, who took the name Levett-Prinsep, resided at Croxall Hall, Derbyshire, Justice of the Peace and landowner
- Valentine Cameron Prinsep (1838–1904), painter, son of Henry Thoby Prinsep, trained to become an Indian merchant but turned to art instead, author of Imperial India, a book of travel writing
- Anthony Leyland Val Prinsep (1888-1942), son of Valentine Prinsep, theatre manager and producer who married Marie Lohr and Margaret Bannerman.
- William H. Prinsep (1794–1874), merchant, Palmer & Co., Carr, Tagore and Company, founder, Union Bank (failed), founder, Bengal Tea Association, founder, Bengal Coal Company, owner, Bengal Salt Company (inherited from his brother George), Sheriff, Fort William, Calcutta, amateur artist (studied under George Chinnery), retired to Hyde Park Place, London, secretary, Great Western Railway, South Devon Railway, one of seven sons of patriarch John Prinsep. Appointed secretary of the Oswestry & Newtown Railway in September 1855 but appointment rescinded in October 1855 because shareholders thought that he would be biased in favour of the Great Western Railway.

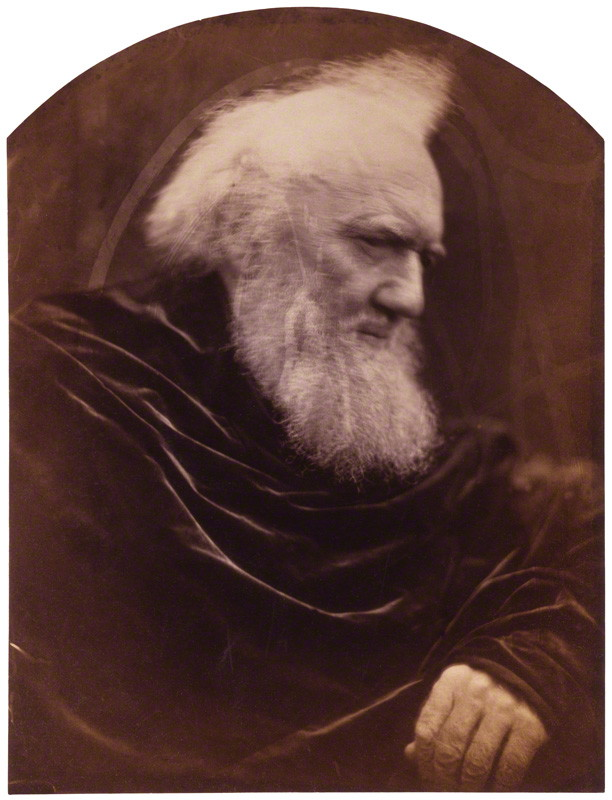
Henry Thoby Prinsep of London. Photograph by Julia Margaret Cameron, 1866

- The tree Prinsepia that grows in India, China and Bangladesh, is named for James Prinsep, secretary of the Asiatic Society of Calcutta.
