= Leopold Demuth =

German opera singer (1861–1910)

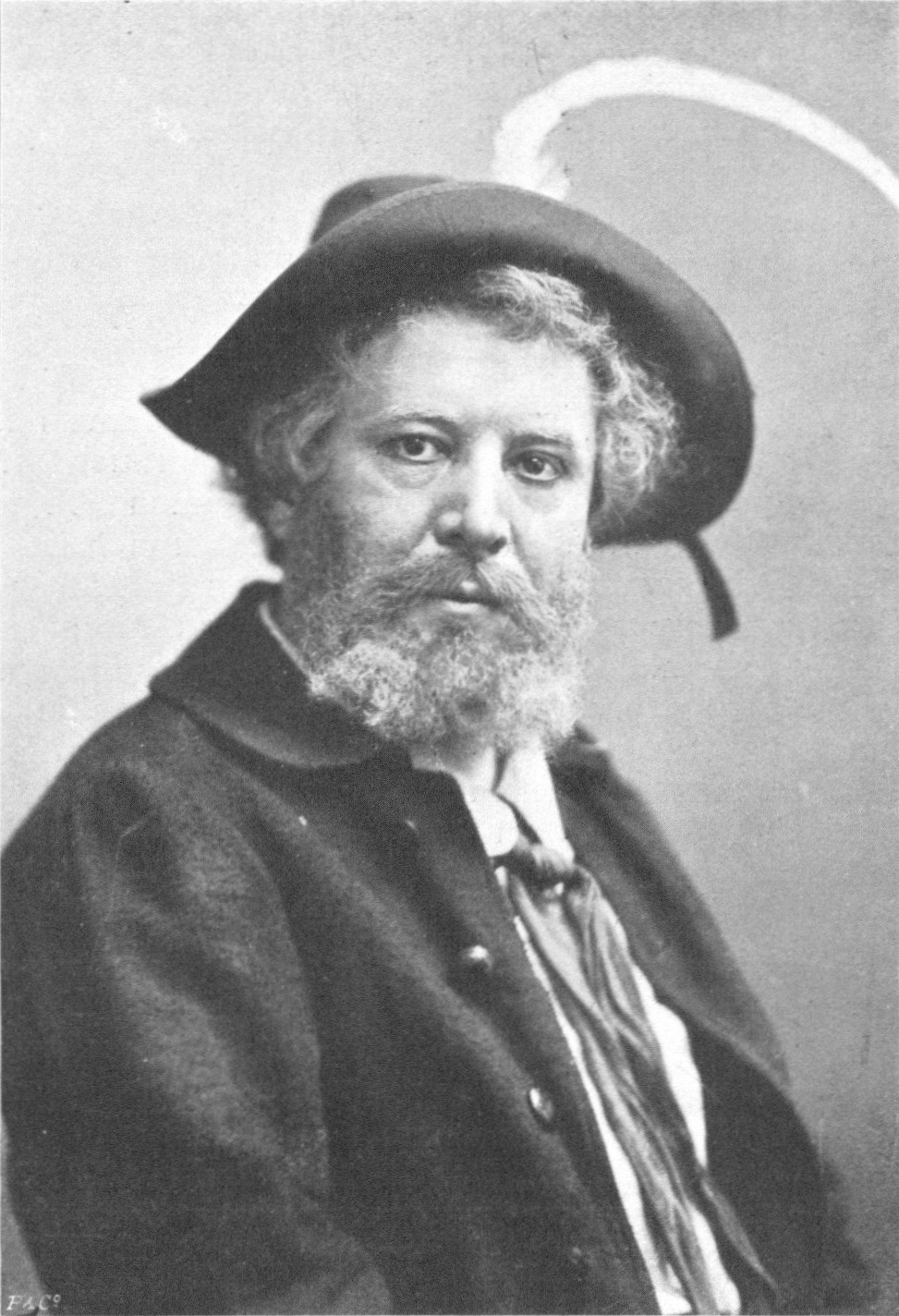
Leopold Demuth as the Vagabond in Xavier Leroux's opera. (Photo: Grillich, 1909)

Leopold Demuth (real name Leopold Pokorny (2 November 1861 in Brno – 4 March 1910 in Czernowitz) was a Moravian operatic baritone. He was celebrated in particular for his successful performances in works by Wolfgang Amadeus Mozart, Giuseppe Verdi and Richard Wagner.

== Life ==
Born Leopold Pokorny in Brno on November 2, 1861, Demuth was the son of a civil servant. Before his singing career, he served in the military. He studied at the Vienna Conservatory with Josef Gänsbacher. In 1889 he made his professional opera debut at the Halle Opera House as the title hero in Heinrich Marschner's Hans Heiling. From 1891 through 1896 he was a resident artist at the Leipzig Opera, and from 1896 through 1898 he was committed to the Hamburg State Opera.

In 1898 Demuth became a resident performer with the Vienna State Opera; a position he held until his death twelve years later. At that opera house he sang a total of 68 leading roles under the leadership of Gustav Mahler. These included the first Falstaff heard at that theatre in 1904, and the first performance of Scarpia at that house in 1910. He also created the role of Polixenes in the world premiere of Karl Goldmark's Ein Wintermärchen in 1908 with Bruno Walter leading the musical forces. That same year he performed the role of Sebastiano in the Vienna premiere of Eugen d'Albert's Tiefland.

Demuth also appeared as a guest artist at several opera houses during his career, including the Berlin State Opera (1897), the Munich Opera Festival (1903 and 1905), and the New German Theatre, Prague (1907). In 1899 he performed the roles of Hans Sachs in Die Meistersinger von Nürnberg and Gunther in Götterdämmerung at the Bayreuth Festival. Other opera houses he performed at as a guest included the Breslau Opera, the Cologne Opera, and the Frankfurt Opera.

Some of the other roles in Demuth's repertoire included Count Almaviva in Mozart's The Marriage of Figaro, Guglielmo in Mozart's Così fan tutte, Herr Fluth in Otto Nicolai's The Merry Wives of Windsor, Jochanaan in Richard Strauss's Salome, Johannes Freudhofer in Wilhelm Kienzl's Der Evangelimann, King Solomon in Goldmark's Die Königin von Saba, Kühleborn in Albert Lortzing's Undine, Kunrad in Strauss's Feuersnot, Renato in Verdi's Un ballo in maschera, Telramund in Wagner's Lohengrin, Tio Lucas in Hugo Wolf's Der Corregidor, Tonio in Pagliacci, Valentin in Faust, Wolfram in Wagner's Tannhäuser, Wotan in The Ring Cycle, and the title roles in Mozart's Don Giovanni, Giuseppe Verdi's Rigoletto, Wagner's The Flying Dutchman, and Karel Weis's 1901 opera Der polnische Jude.

Demuth died on March 4, 1910, in Czernowitz (now Chernovtsy, Ukraine). He was buried in the Vienna Central Cemetery. He made numerous recordings during the last decade of his life; the earliest in 1900 with Berliner Gramophone. He also made records with Deutsche Grammophon and the Gramophone Company. He was married to the actress Eugenie Lenau.
