= Altes Theater (Leipzig) =

German theatre

Coordinates: 51°20′38″N 12°22′20″E

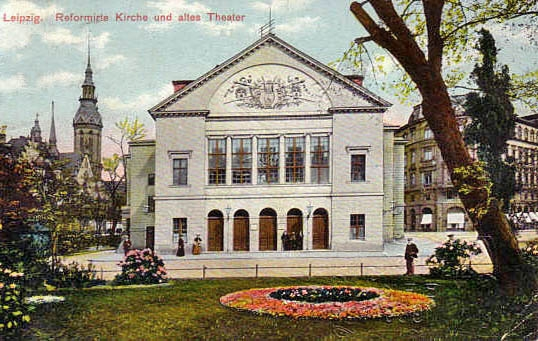
Altes Theater in Leipzig (1906)

Altes Theater (the old theatre) was the first theatre building in the German city of Leipzig. It was on the site of today's tramway station Goerdelerring near Richard-Wagner-Platz.

== History ==
Commissioned by the businessman Benedikt Zehmisch in 1766 from the architect Georg Rudolph Fäsch (1710–1787), it was at first called the Theater auf der Rannischen Bastei and sited on the foundations of a bastion on the city wall. It had three tiers of seating and boxes, with a capacity of 1186 standing and seated. It opened on 7 October 1766 with the tragedy Hermann by Johann Elias Schlegel, a ballet and a comedy – the audience included Johann Wolfgang von Goethe. In 1768 Gotthold Ephraim Lessing put on his play Minna von Barnhelm there. Johann Adam Hiller also sang there.

The building was renovated and extended in 1796 and 1802 and finally converted to the classical style in 1817 by Friedrich Weinbrenner and the university's chief-of-works Carl August Benjamin Siegel. It reopened in 1817 as the Theater der Stadt Leipzig and its 1828–29 season saw the premieres of Heinrich Marschner's Der Vampyr and Der Templer und die Jüdin. From 1829 to 1832 it served as the court theatre for the Kingdom of Saxony before passing into private hands. After the Neues Theater was built in 1868, the theatre was renamed the Altes Theater and used only for plays and operettas. From 1912 onwards it was again operated by the city council.

On 7 December 1912, it hosted the world premiere of the 6-scene play Peterchens Mondfahrt by Gerdt von Bassewitz, who turned it into an illustrated children's book in 1915. On 8 December 1923 it also saw the world premiere of Bertolt Brecht's drama Baal, causing a scandal which led the mayor to cancel the rest of its run. The building was destroyed by a British air raid on the night of 3–4 December 1943 and the ruins demolished after the war.

== See also ==
- Architecture of Leipzig – Neoclassicism

== Sources ==
- "Richard-Wagner-Platz". Universität Leipzig (in German).
- "Notenspur: Stationsansicht". Notenspur (in German).
