= Heiling =

Heiling may refer to:

- Hans Heiling (mythology), a legendary person in German and Bohemian mythology
- Hans Heiling, an 1833 opera by Heinrich Marschner on the legend

== See also ==
- Heil (disambiguation)
