= Der Bäbu =

Opera by Heinrich Marschner

- Opera by Heinrich Marschner
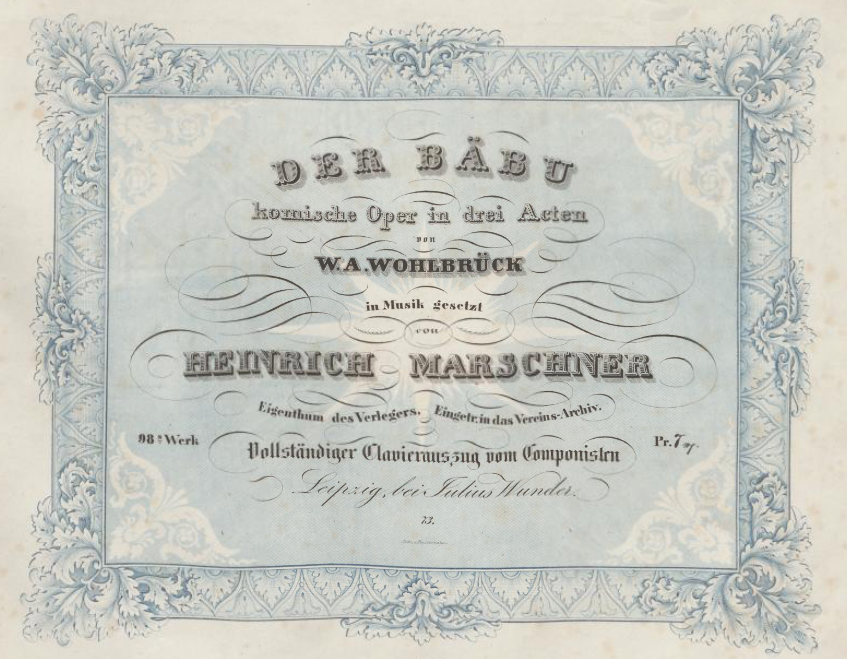
- Vocal score
- Translation: The Baboo
- Librettist: Wilhelm August Wohlbrück
- Language: German
- Based on: Augustus Prinsep's The Baboo and Other Tales Descriptive of Society in India
- Premiere: 19 February 1838; Opernhaus Hannover

Der Bäbu (The Baboo) is a Comic opera in three acts by Heinrich Marschner. The German libretto by Wilhelm August Wohlbrück (Marschner's brother-in-law) is based on the book The Baboo and Other Tales Descriptive of Society in India, Smith, Elder, and Co., London 1834 by Augustus Prinsep. The first performance took place on 19 February 1838 in Hanover.

== Roles ==
Role	Voice type	Premiere,19 February 1838
Bäbu Brischmohun Bonurschi	baritone	Traugott Gey
Nabob Jussuf Ali Khan	bass	
Dilafrose, his daughter	soprano	Adele Jazedé
Heinrich Forester	tenor	Eduard Holzmiller
Gosain, fakir	bass	
Eva Eldridge, his niece	soprano	
Friedrich Mosely	tenor	
Conductor		Heinrich Marschner

== Instrumentation ==
Marschner scored the opera for two piccolos and two flutes (not doubling), two oboes, two clarinets, two bassoons, four horns, three trombones, timpani, tamtam, and strings.

== Recordings ==
- Overtura
