= List of operas by Heinrich Marschner =

This is a complete list of operas by Heinrich Marschner (1795–1861).

== List ==
Title	Genre	Subdivisions	Libretto	Première date	Place, theatre
La clemenza di Tito	opera seria	3 acts	Caterino Mazzola, after Metastasio	composed 1816, but unperformed	
Das stille Volk	Zauberspiel		August Gottlieb Hornbostel	abandoned 1818	
Saidar und Zulima, oder Liebe und Grossmut		3 acts	August Gottlieb Hornbostel	26 November 1818	Pressburg, Schauspielhaus
Heinrich IV und D'Aubigné	grosse Oper	3 acts	August Gottlieb Hornbostel	19 July 1820	Dresden, Hoftheater
Der Kiffhäuser Berg	romantische Oper	1 act	August von Kotzebue	2 January 1822	Zittau
Der Holzdieb	Singspiel	1 act	Friedrich Kind	22 February 1825	Dresden, Hoftheater
Die Wiener in Berlin	Liederspiel	1 act	C E von Holtei	24 August 1825	Dresden, am Linckeschen Bade
Lucretia Op. 67	Oper	2 acts	Joseph August Eckschlager	17 January 1827 (Act 1 only)	Danzig, Danziger
Der Vampyr	romantische Oper	2 acts	Wilhelm August Wohlbrück, after Heinrich Ludwig Ritter's Der Vampir oder die Totenbraut and John Polidori's The Vampyre	29 March 1828	Leipzig, Stadt
Der Templer und die Jüdin, Op. 60	grosse romantische Oper	3 acts	Wilhelm August Wohlbrück, after Johann Reinhold von Lenz's Das Gericht der Templer and Sir Walter Scott's Ivanhoe	22 December 1829	Leipzig, Stadt
Des Falkners Braut, Op. 65	komische Oper	3 acts	Wilhelm August Wohlbrück, after Alexander Julius Carl Spindler	10 March 1830	Leipzig, Stadt
Hans Heiling	romantische Oper	prologue and 3 acts	Eduard Devrient	24 May 1833	Berlin, Hofoper
Das Schloss am Ätna	grosse romantische Oper	3 acts	Ernst August Friedrich Klingemann	29 January 1836	Leipzig, Stadt
Der Bäbu, Op. 98	komische Oper	2 acts	Wilhelm August Wohlbrück	19 February 1838	Hanover, Hof
Kaiser Adolf von Nassau, Op. 130	grosse Oper	4 acts	Heribert Rau	5 January 1845	Dresden, Hoftheater
Austin	romantische Oper	4 acts	Marianne Marschner	25 January 1852	Hanover, Hof
Geborgt (revision of Der Holzdieb)	Singspiel	1 act	Friedrich Kind	1853	Dresden?
Der Sangeskönig Hiarne, oder Das Tyrfingschwert	grosse romantische Oper	4 acts	Wilhelm Grothe, after Esaias Tegnér	13 September 1863	Frankfurt, National
