= Symphonic Études =

Piano compositions by Robert Schumann

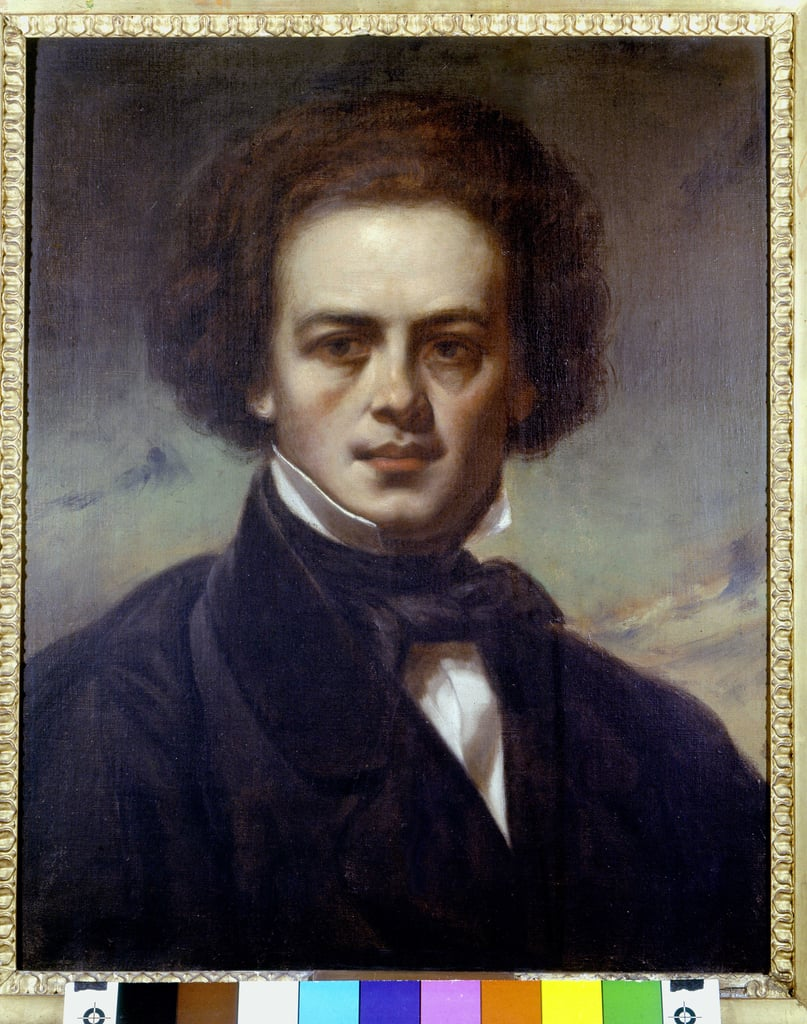
Schumann portraited in his twenties or thirties

The Symphonic Études (French: Études symphoniques), Op. 13, is a set of études for solo piano by Robert Schumann. It began in 1834 as a theme and sixteen variations on a theme by Baron von Fricken, plus a further variation on an entirely different theme by Heinrich Marschner.

== Composition ==
The first edition in 1837 carried an annotation that the tune was "the composition of an amateur": this referred to the origin of the theme, which had been sent to Schumann by Baron von Fricken, guardian of Ernestine von Fricken, the Estrella of his Carnaval Op. 9. The baron, an amateur musician, had used the melody in a Theme with Variations for flute. Schumann had been engaged to Ernestine in 1834, only to break abruptly with her the year after. An autobiographical element is thus interwoven in the genesis of the Études symphoniques (as in that of many other works of Schumann's).

Of the sixteen variations Schumann composed on Fricken's theme, only eleven were published by him. (An early version, completed between 1834 and January 1835, contained twelve movements). The final, twelfth, published étude was a variation on the theme from the Romance Du stolzes England freue dich (Proud England, rejoice!), from Heinrich Marschner's opera Der Templer und die Jüdin, which was based on Sir Walter Scott's Ivanhoe (as a tribute to Schumann's English friend, William Sterndale Bennett). The earlier Fricken theme occasionally appears briefly during this étude. The work was first published in 1837 as XII Études Symphoniques. Only nine of the twelve études were specifically designated as variations. The sequence was as follows:

- Theme – Andante [C^{♯} minor]
- Etude I (Variation 1) – Un poco più vivo [C^{♯} minor]
- Etude II (Variation 2) – Andante [C^{♯} minor]
- Etude III – Vivace [E Major]
- Etude IV (Variation 3) – Allegro marcato [C^{♯} minor]
- Etude V (Variation 4) – Scherzando [C^{♯} minor]
- Etude VI (Variation 5) – Agitato [C^{♯} minor]
- Etude VII (Variation 6) – Allegro molto [E Major]
- Etude VIII (Variation 7) – Sempre marcatissimo [C^{♯} minor]
- Etude IX – Presto possibile [C^{♯} minor]
- Etude X (Variation 8) – Allegro con energia [C^{♯} minor]
- Etude XI (Variation 9) – Andante espressivo [G^{♯} minor]
- Etude XII (Finale) – Allegro brillante (based on Marschner's theme) [D^{♭} Major]

Other titles had been considered in September 1834: Variations pathétiques and Etuden im Orchestercharakter von Florestan und Eusebius. In this latter case the Études would have been signed by two imaginary figures in whom Schumann personified two essential, opposite and complementary aspects of his own personality and his own poetic world. 'Florestan and Eusebius' then signed the Davidsbündlertänze, Op. 6; but only in the 1835 version of the Études symphoniques were the pieces divided so as to emphasize the alternation of more lyrical, melancholy and introvert pages (Eusebius) with those of a more excitable and dynamic nature (Florestan). In the 1837 version Florestan prevails.

Fifteen years later, in a second edition (Leipzig 1852), the 1837 title Études symphoniques became Études en forme de variations, two etudes (Nos. 3 and 9) that did not correspond to the new title (not being exactly variations) were eliminated, and some revisions were made in the piano writing.

The entire work was dedicated to Schumann's English friend, the pianist and composer William Sterndale Bennett. Bennett played the piece frequently in England to great acclaim, but Schumann thought it was unsuitable for public performance and advised his wife Clara not to play it.

== Character ==
Leaving aside the allusions to Florestan and Eusebius, all of Schumann's proposed titles show some of the essential character of Op. 13's conception. This was of 'studies' in the sense that the term had assumed in Frédéric Chopin's Op. 10, that is to say, concert pieces in which the investigation of possibilities of technique and timbre in writing for the piano is carried out; they are 'symphonic études' through the wealth and complexity of the colours evoked – the keyboard becomes an "orchestra" capable of blending, contrasting or superimposing different timbres.

If etudes Nos. 3 and 9 are excluded, where the connection with the theme is tenuous, the etudes are in variation form. It was not the first time that Schumann had tackled variation form. But here the variation principle is used more as free transformation, no longer of an actual theme, but of a musical 'cell' or cells (as for example in the same composer's Carnaval). The Études symphoniques learn the lesson of Beethoven's Diabelli Variations: the theme that acts as a unifying element is amplified and transformed, and becomes the basis from which blossom inventions of divergent expressive character. The work also shows the influence of the Goldberg Variations, most obviously in the use of a pseudo-French overture variation (the 7th Variation) , and in the use of various canonic effects (most notably, in Variations 1, 3 and 7).

The highly virtuosic demands of the piano writing are frequently aimed not merely at effect but at clarification of the polyphonic complexity and at delving more deeply into keyboard experimentation. The Etudes are considered to be one of the most difficult works for piano by Schumann (together with his Fantasy in C and Toccata) and in Romantic literature as a whole.

== Later publication history ==
In 1861, five years after Schumann's death, his father-in-law Friedrich Wieck published a third edition under the editorial pseudonym "DAS" (an acronym for Der alte Schulmeister). This edition attempted to reconcile the differences between the earlier two, and bore both the previous titles XII Études Symphoniques and Études en forme de variations.

On republishing the set in 1890, Johannes Brahms restored the five variations that had been cut by Schumann. These are now often played, but in positions within the cycle that vary somewhat with each performance; there are now twelve variations and these five so-called "posthumous" variations which exist as a supplement.

The five posthumously published sections (all based on Fricken's theme) are:

- Variation I – Andante, Tempo del tema [C# minor]
- Variation II – Meno mosso [C# major]
- Variation III – Allegro [C# minor]
- Variation IV – Allegretto [C# minor]
- Variation V – Moderato [D♭ major]

== Orchestrations ==
The Etude XI and XII (finale), were orchestrated by Pyotr Ilyich Tchaikovsky, and have been recorded.
