= Marie-Louise Gilles =

German mezzo-soprano

- Born: 1937 (age 88–89); Düren, Germany
- Education: Folkwangschule
- Occupations: Operatic mezzo-soprano; Academic teacher
- Organizations: Staatstheater Wiesbaden; Staatsoper Hannover; Musikhochschule Hannover
- Website: www.marie-louise-gilles.de

Marie-Louise Gilles (or Marie-Luise Gilles; born 1937) is a German mezzo-soprano in opera and concert, a professor of voice, and an opera stage director.

== Career ==
Born in Düren, Gilles studied at the Folkwangschule in Essen with Hilde Wesselmann. After a first engament at the Stadttheater Oberhausen, she was a member of the Staatstheater Wiesbaden from 1961 to 1964, where she appeared as Dorabella in Mozart's Così fan tutte and performed trouser roles in operas by Richard Strauss, Octavian in Der Rosenkavalier and the composer in Ariadne auf Naxos. After Munich and Bremen, she sang from 1968 at the Staatsoper Hannover. The same year, she appeared at the Bayreuth Festival as the valkyrie Grimgerde in Richard Wagner's Die Walküre. She performed in 1969 in Hans Pfitzner's Palestrina another trousers role, Palestrina's pupil Silja. In 1973, she appeared in Benjamin Britten's Owen Wingrave, conducted by George Alexander Albrecht, with Gerhard Faulstich in the title role, Astrid Schirmer as Miss Wingrave, and Theo Altmeyer in supporting roles. She sang in 1977 the parts of Waltraute and Second Norne in Wagner's Götterdämmerung, alongside Herbert Becker and Ute Vinzing. Leading parts included characters by Verdi (Azucena in Der Troubadour, Eboli in Don Carlos) and Wagner (Brangäne in Tristan und Isolde, Ortrud in Lohengrin, Fricka in Die Walküre), and Santuzza in Mascagni's Cavalleria rusticana. In operas by Alban Berg, she performed Countess Geschwitz in Lulu and the soprano part of Marie in Wozzeck.

From 1982, Gilles has been a professor at the Musikhochschule Hannover. She was also a stage director for opera.

Gilles was one of the soloists for the series of broadcasts and recordings of Bach's cantatas with Diethard Hellmann. In 1972, she recorded the alto part in J. S. Bach's St Matthew Passion with Philipp Röhl conducting his choir Philharmonischer Chor Köln. The same year, she recorded the part of Gertrude in Heinrich Marschner's opera Hans Heiling, conducted by Gerd Albrecht, with choir and orchestra of RAI Turin, with Bernd Weikl in the title role, Gerti Zeumer as Anna and Ursula Schröder-Feinen as the Königin der Erdgeister.
