= Bass-baritone =

Voice type between bass and baritone

A bass-baritone is a high-lying bass or low-lying "classical" baritone voice type which shares certain qualities with the true baritone voice. The term arose in the late 19th century to describe the particular type of voice required to sing three Wagnerian roles: the title role in Der fliegende Holländer, Wotan/Der Wanderer in the Ring Cycle and Hans Sachs in Die Meistersinger von Nürnberg. Wagner labelled these roles as Hoher Bass ("high bass")—see fach for more details.

The bass-baritone voice is distinguished by two attributes. First, it must be capable of singing comfortably in a baritonal tessitura. Secondly, however, it needs to have the ripely resonant lower range typically associated with the bass voice. For example, the role of Wotan in Die Walküre covers the range from F_{2} (the F at the bottom of the bass clef) to F♯_{4} (the F♯ above middle C), but only infrequently descends beyond C_{3} (the C below middle C). Bass-baritones are typically divided into two separate categories: lyric bass-baritone and dramatic bass-baritone.

Bass-baritones should not be confused with their vocal cousin—the so-called Verdi baritone. This type of Italianate baritone voice has a brighter tone colour and sings at a slightly higher tessitura than that possessed by the bass-baritone. In addition to the operas of Giuseppe Verdi, its natural home is to be found in operatic music composed after about 1830 by the likes of Donizetti, Ponchielli, Massenet, Puccini and the verismo composers.

The term bass-baritone is roughly synonymous with the Italian vocal classification basso cantante; for example, in the Verdian repertoire, Philip II in Don Carlos is usually taken by a bass-baritone, while Ferrando in Il trovatore is sung by a true bass, though the two roles' ranges are very similar. In Debussy's Pelléas et Mélisande the role of Golaud, created by Hector Dufranne, sits between Pelléas (high baritone) and Arkel (bass). Some of the classical Mozart baritone roles such as Don Giovanni, Count Almaviva, and Gugliemo—composed before the term "baritone" gained currency—are occasionally played by a bass-baritone.

Gilbert and Sullivan's Savoy operas usually featured a comic bass-baritone character, created to make use of D'Oyly Carte company member Richard Temple.

In short: the bass-baritone is a voice that has the resonant low notes of the typical bass allied with the ability to sing in a baritonal tessitura. Colloquially, it refers to a voice with a range and tone somewhere between a bass and a baritone.

The bass-baritone's required range can vary tremendously based on the role, with some less demanding than others. Many bass-baritones have ventured into the baritone repertoire, including (among others) Leopold Demuth, Georges Baklanoff, Rudolf Bockelmann, George London, Thomas Quasthoff, Thomas Stewart, James Morris, and Bryn Terfel.

== Repertoire ==
"Le veau d'or"
Méphistophélès in Faust, performed by Feodor Chaliapin

"Die Frist ist um"
The Dutchman in Der fliegende Holländer, performed by Friedrich Schorr

The following operatic parts are performed by bass-baritones but sometimes by high basses:

- Don Pizarro, Fidelio by Beethoven
- Golaud, Pelléas et Mélisande by Debussy
- Olin Blitch, Susannah by Floyd
- Méphistophélès, Faust by Gounod
- Leporello, Don Giovanni by Mozart
- Don Alfonso, Così fan tutte by Mozart
- Figaro, The Marriage of Figaro by Mozart

Core bass-baritone operatic parts:

- Escamillo, Carmen by Bizet
- Igor^{*}, Prince Igor by Borodin
- Porgy, Porgy and Bess by Gershwin
- The 4 Villains, The Tales of Hoffmann by Offenbach
- Scarpia^{*}, Tosca by Puccini
- Dutchman, Der fliegende Holländer by Wagner
- Hans Sachs, Die Meistersinger von Nürnberg by Wagner
- Wotan, Der Ring des Nibelungen by Wagner
- Amfortas, Parsifal by Wagner

Bass-baritone parts in Gilbert and Sullivan works:

- Trial by Jury: Usher
- The Sorcerer: Sir Marmaduke Pointdextre
- H.M.S. Pinafore: Dick Deadeye
- The Pirates of Penzance: The Pirate King
- Patience: Colonel Calverley
- Princess Ida: King Hildebrand
- Princess Ida: Arac
- Princess Ida: Guron
- The Mikado: The Mikado of Japan
- Ruddigore: Sir Roderic Murgatroyd
- The Yeomen of the Guard: Sergeant Meryll
- The Gondoliers: Don Alhambra del Bolero

Other bass-baritone parts:

- Roméo et Juliette by Berlioz
- Symphony No.15 by Langgaard
- Cantabile, symphonic suite by Magle
- Gurre-Lieder by Schoenberg

^{*} A role also sung by 'standard' baritones

== See also ==
- Soprano
- Mezzo-soprano
- Contralto
- Tenor
- Baritone
- Bass
