= Thomas Levett-Prinsep =

English landowner

Thomas Levett-Prinsep (born Thomas Levett; 1800/1–1849) was an English landowner in Derbyshire and Staffordshire. He took on the additional name of Prinsep on inheriting his uncle's holding of Croxall Hall.

== Life ==
He was born at Wychnor Park in Wychnor, Staffordshire, the third son of Theophilus Levett, High Sheriff of Staffordshire. He was educated at Eton College, and matriculated at Trinity College, Oxford in 1828, aged 17.

In 1835, Levett inherited Croxall Hall in Derbyshire.

=== Croxall Hall descent ===
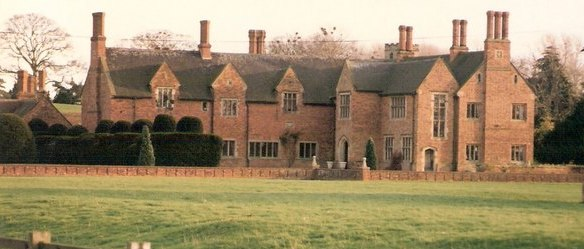
Croxall Hall, inherited by Thomas Levett-Prinsep from his uncle Thomas Prinsep

Croxall Hall is located eight miles (13 km) southwest of Burton-on-Trent. The Curzon family held it for 15 consecutive generations. Mary Curzon, the heiress of the Curzon family and governess to the Royal Family, married Sir Edward Sackville, 4th Earl of Dorset.

John Prinsep Esq., India merchant and progenitor of the Anglo-Indian family of the same name, purchased the property from George Sackville, 4th Duke of Dorset, and became lord of the manor. The Prinseps became well known for the cattle they bred at their Croxall estate, which at 1,450 acres (5.9 km^{2}) was said to be the biggest family farm in Derbyshire at the time. Croxall Hall is near to Catton Hall, once a property of the Anson family, who later intermarried with the Levetts of nearby Milford Hall, distant relations of Thomas Levett-Prinsep. Thomas Prinsep, High Sheriff of Derbyshire in 1802, died without an heir, and so left Croxall Hall to his nephew, the son of Theophilus Levett of Wychnor Hall, High Sheriff of Staffordshire, who had married in 1794 Frances Prinsep, daughter of John Prinsep of Croxall Hall, and sister of Thomas Prinsep. Prinsep left his property to his nephew Levett on condition that he adopt the name and coat of arms of Prinsep in addition to Levett.

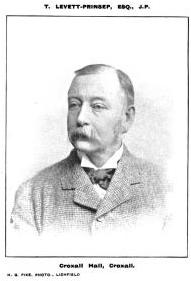
Thomas Levett-Prinsep, Esq., JP, Croxall Hall, Staffordshire

=== Later life ===
Following his second marriage, Thomas Levett-Prinsep (as now he was) returned to Croxall Hall, which he had inherited from his father. He renovated the Hall, and built The Grange to manage his farmland. The couple moved to nearby Walton Hall, Walton-on-Trent.

Levett-Prinsep was a Derbyshire JP, member of the Tamworth Board of Guardians, and cattle breeder in Derbyshire. He died suddenly while crossing Teignmouth Harbour.

== Family and legacy ==
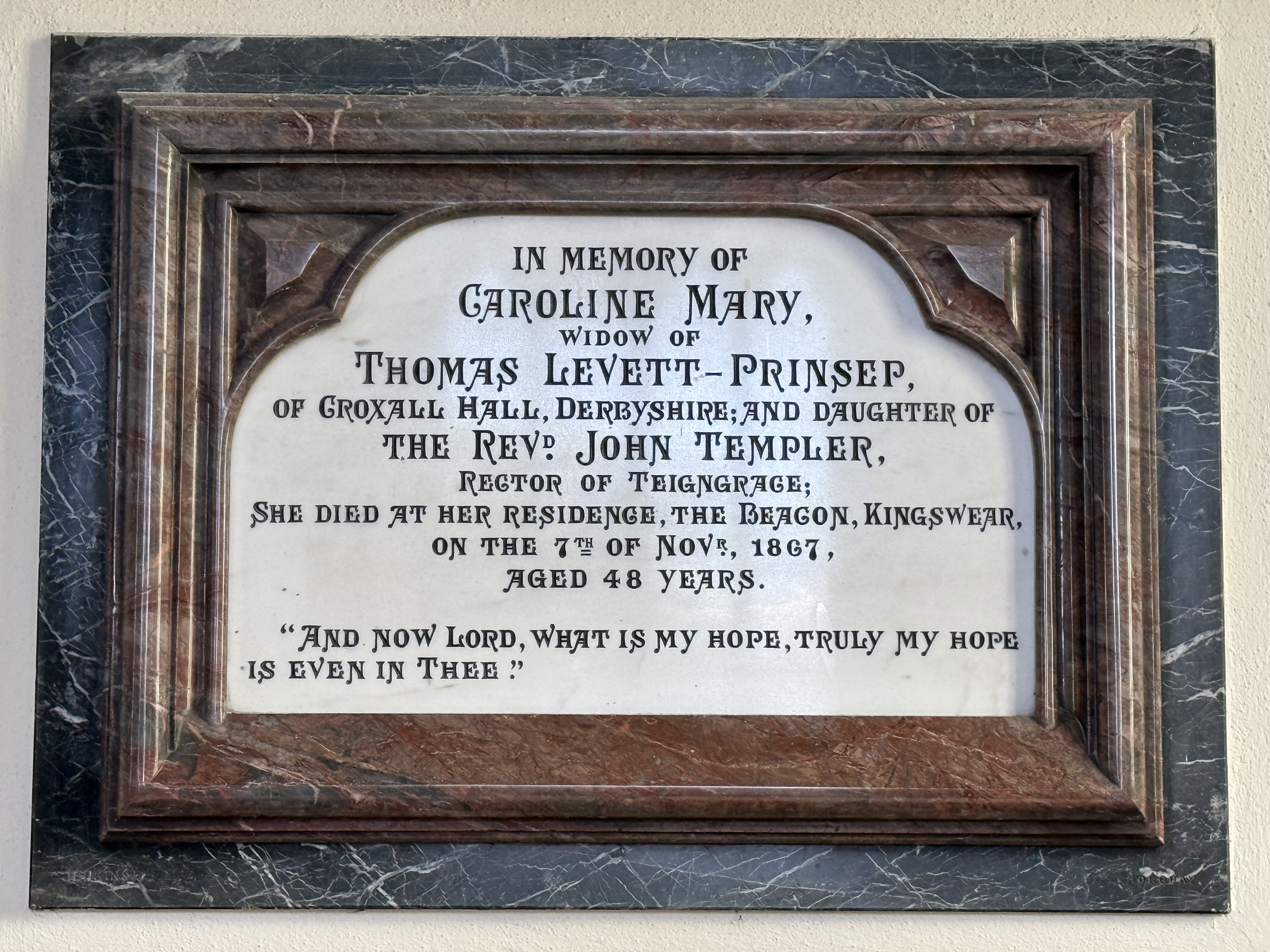
Memorial to his second wife, Caroline Mary, in Church of St Thomas of Canterbury, Kingswear

Levett married:

1. In 1831 Margaret, the daughter of Scottish merchant David Monro, a seigneur, businessman and political figure in Lower Canada who, after building a fortune in the Canadian ironworks, left North America and moved to Bath, Somerset.
2. Following Margaret's death, in 1838 as his second wife Caroline Mary Templer. She was the daughter of Rev. John James Templer of Newton Abbot in Devon, the Rector of Teigngrace and a member of the Templer family who owned Stover House and the 80,000-acre (320 km^{2}) Stover Estate in Devon – later sold due to Templer family financial troubles to Edward St Maur, 11th Duke of Somerset. Rev. Templer's other daughter Henrietta was married to Thomas Levett-Prinsep's elder brother Theophilus Levett, who had inherited the Levett family's Wychnor Park.

His children, surname Levett-Prinsep, included:

- A daughter of the first marriage, Margaret Catherine Levett-Prinsep, born in 1837 in Bath. In 1860 she married her cousin Robert Thomas Kennedy Levett, son of John Levett and his wife, the former Sophia Eliza Kennedy, of Wychnor Park. Thomas Prinsep Levett (born 1862, died 1938), George Arthur Monro Levett (born 1871, died 1940) and Robert Kennedy Levett were their children.
- A son, also Thomas Levett-Prinsep, heir to the Croxall estate at his early death in 1849. He married on 23 June 1868, at Stokenham, Devon, Georgina Holdsworth, daughter of Arthur Bastard Easterbrook Holdsworth of Widdicombe House (son of Arthur Howe Holdsworth): Their daughter Katherine Mary married in 1896 Lt. Col. Henry Edward Disbrow Wise, CBE, and their son Thomas Arthur Levett-Prinsep, born 1879, married in 1907 Margaret Noel Simpson, from a Yorkshire clerical family; they were the parents of Thomas Francis Anthony Levett-Prinsep (1908–1983), an artist known as Anthony Prinsep.

The Levett-Prinsep heirs sold Croxall Hall in 1920, and moved to the West Country, closer to family relations there. The family eventually inherited Widdicombe House in Kingsbridge, Devon.

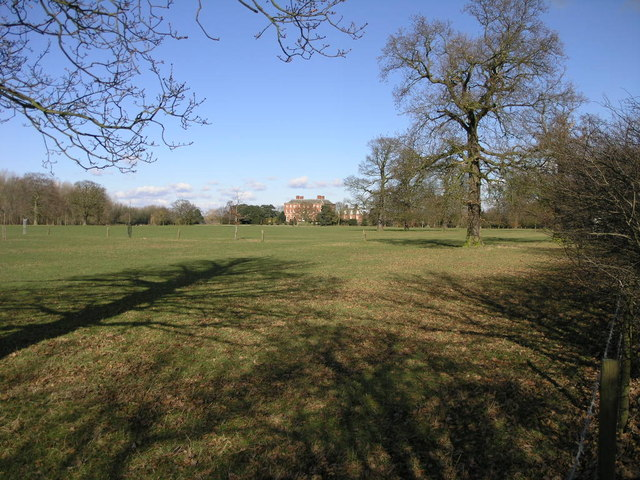
Catton Hall, one of two manors, along with Levett-Prinsep's Croxall Hall, within the parish of Croxall in Derbyshire

== Sources ==
- The Levetts of Staffordshire, Dyonese Levett Haszard, Milford, Staffordshire, privately printed
- Victoria County History: A History of the County of Stafford, M.W. Greenslade, R.B. Pugh (editors)
