= Der Templer und die Jüdin =

Opera by Heinrich Marschner

- Opera by Heinrich Marschner
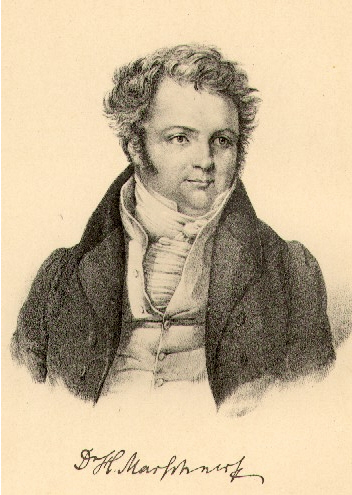
- Portrait of Heinrich Marschner in 1838
- Translation: The Templar and the Jewess
- Librettist: Wilhelm August Wohlbrück
- Language: German
- Based on: Walter Scott's Ivanhoe
- Premiere: 22 December 1829; Altes Theater (Leipzig)

Der Templer und die Jüdin (English: The Templar and the Jewess) is an opera (designated as a Große romantische Oper) in three acts by Heinrich Marschner. The German libretto by Wilhelm August Wohlbrück was based on a number of intermediate works based in turn on Walter Scott's 1819 novel Ivanhoe.

== Performance history ==
The first performance took place at the Leipzig Opera on 22 December 1829. It became Marschner's most successful work and was staged more than 200 times in Germany during the next 70 years.

A revised version with recitatives rather than spoken dialogue was performed in Berlin on 3 August 1831 with Eduard Devrient as Bois-Guilbert. It was given in London at the Prince's Theatre on 17 June 1840, and in New York on 29 January 1872.

Many critics regarded the opera as unnecessarily complicated (and expensive to produce) and simplified versions were prepared by Felix Mottl, Richard Kleinmichel and finally Hans Pfitzner (1912). The latter's version was performed in Lübeck, Strasbourg and Cologne just before the First World War.

The opera was revived at the Wexford Festival in 1989, conducted by Albert Rosen and directed by Francesca Zambello, with William Stone as Bois-Guilbert and Greer Grimsley as the Black Knight.

Robert Schumann quotes an air from this opera in the finale of his Études symphoniques for piano.

== Roles ==
Role	Voice type	Premiere Cast, 22 December 1829 (Conductor: Heinrich Marschner)
Brian de Bois-Guilbert, Templar	baritone	Heinrich Hammermeister
Friar Tuck, Hermit of Copmanhurst	bass	Wilhelm Fischer
Cedric von Rotherwood, Saxon knight	bass	Wilhelm Pögner
The Black Knight (King Richard I)	bass	Eduard Schütz
Lokslei, the outlaw leader	baritone	
Lucas de Beaumanoir, Knights Templar Grand Master	bass	
Maurice de Bracy, Norman knight	tenor	
Rebecca, the Jewess, daughter of Isaac of York	soprano	Fortunata Franchetti-Wazel
Rowena von Hargottstandstede, ward of Cedric	soprano	Henriette Wüst
Wamba, a fool	tenor	August Wiedemann
Wilfried von Ivanhoe, son of Cedric	tenor	Ubrich
Oswald, Cedric's steward	bass	
Albert Malvoisin, Norman knight	spoken	
Conrad, Malvoisin's squire	spoken	
Elgitha, Rowena's maid	spoken	
Isaac of York, a Jew	spoken	
Walter, an outlaw	spoken	
Willibald, an outlaw	spoken	
Robert, Bois-Guilbert's squire	spoken	
Philip, Bois-Guilbert's squire	spoken	
Herdibert	spoken	

== Synopsis ==
The opera is set in England at the end of the 12th century and the main characters include The Black Knight, King Richard 'the Lionheart', Saxons, Normans, Templars and Robin Hood (here called Lokslei, i.e., Locksley) and his band of outlaws.
