= James F. M. Prinsep =

English footballer

James Frederick McLeod Prinsep (27 July 1861 – 22 November 1895) was an English footballer who held two 'youngest player' records for almost 125 years, before they were both broken within the space of just over a year.

He made his debut (and only appearance) for England, against Scotland on 5 April 1879, at the age of 17 years and 252 days, which made him England's youngest-ever player at the time. He held this record for almost 124 years, until Wayne Rooney made his debut at the age of 17 years and 111 days against Australia on 12 February 2003. Prinsep was selected for a further England v Scotland international fixture in 1882 but was unavailable.

Prinsep played for Clapham Rovers, and also formerly held the record for being the youngest player to play in an FA Cup final, playing in the 1879 final against Old Etonians at the age of 17 years and 245 days. This record was broken not long after his England record, by then Millwall player Curtis Weston, who played in the 2004 final aged 17 years and 119 days.

== Early life ==
Prinsep, born in India, was a descendant of the Anglo-Indian merchant John Prinsep. His namesake, the scholar James Prinsep, was his grandfather's brother. He attended Charterhouse School from 1874 to 1878 and played for their football XI in 1876 and 1877, as well as their cricket XI.

== Football career ==
He played as half-back, being described by C.W. Alcock as "..always cool, very strong on his legs, and combining plenty of strength with great accuracy; kicks splendidly and with judgement; seldom makes a mistake", also "can kick the ball in any position, and passes it admirably to his forwards".

His first FA Cup Final in 1879 saw Clapham Rovers lose 1–0 to Old Etonians. The second however, for his old boy club Old Carthusians two years later, saw his team defeat the Old Etonians 3–0.

His only appearance for England saw them win 5–4, at Kennington Oval against Scotland.

Aside from his clubs, he played in representative matches for Surrey county, London, The South v The North and The Rest v England.

== Other sports ==
Prinsep was also a club cricketer, especially effective as a bowler, with Free Foresters and the Grey Friars cricket club, the latter club drawn from Old Carthusians.

== Military career ==
He entered the Royal Military College, Sandhurst in 1878 and played in their football teams also, during a period that covered his F.A. Cup Finals and international match.

Prinsep was commissioned into the Essex Regiment in 1882 and went on to see action in the Mahdist War. In 1884 he was awarded the Bronze Medal of the Royal Humane Society after saving a fellow soldier from drowning in the Shaban Cataract of the Nile. In 1885 he received a second award of the same medal for rescuing a Sudanese sailor from the same river near El Sabon. In 1885, as a Major, he was seconded to the Egyptian Army. He transferred to the Egyptian Coastguard in 1890, serving until his death when he reached rank of Sub-Inspector General.

== Death ==
Most sources record that he was killed fighting in Egypt at the age of 34, although the Charterhouse School register of former pupils records that he died in Nairn. In fact, he died of blood poisoning and kidney failure after seven weeks' illness with pneumonia which developed after a cold he suffered when playing golf.

== Honours ==
Clapham Rovers

- FA Cup runner-up: 1878–79

Old Carthusians

- FA Cup: 1880–81

== See also ==
- List of England international footballers born outside England
