= Josef Gänsbacher =

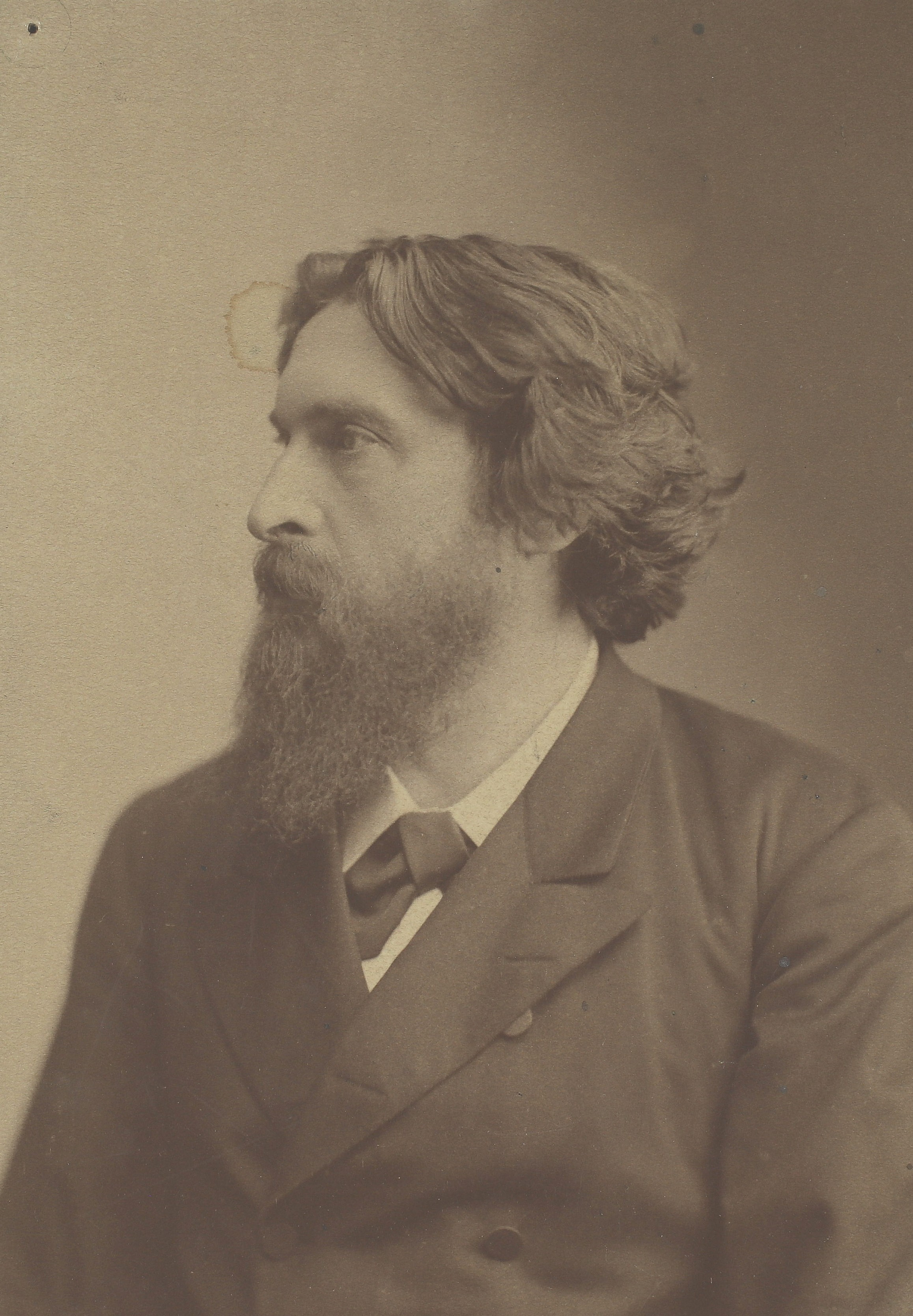
Photograph of Gänsbacher by Josef Löwy, 1879

Josef Gänsbacher (6 October 1829 in Vienna – 5 June 1911 ibid) was an Austrian music educator.

== Life ==
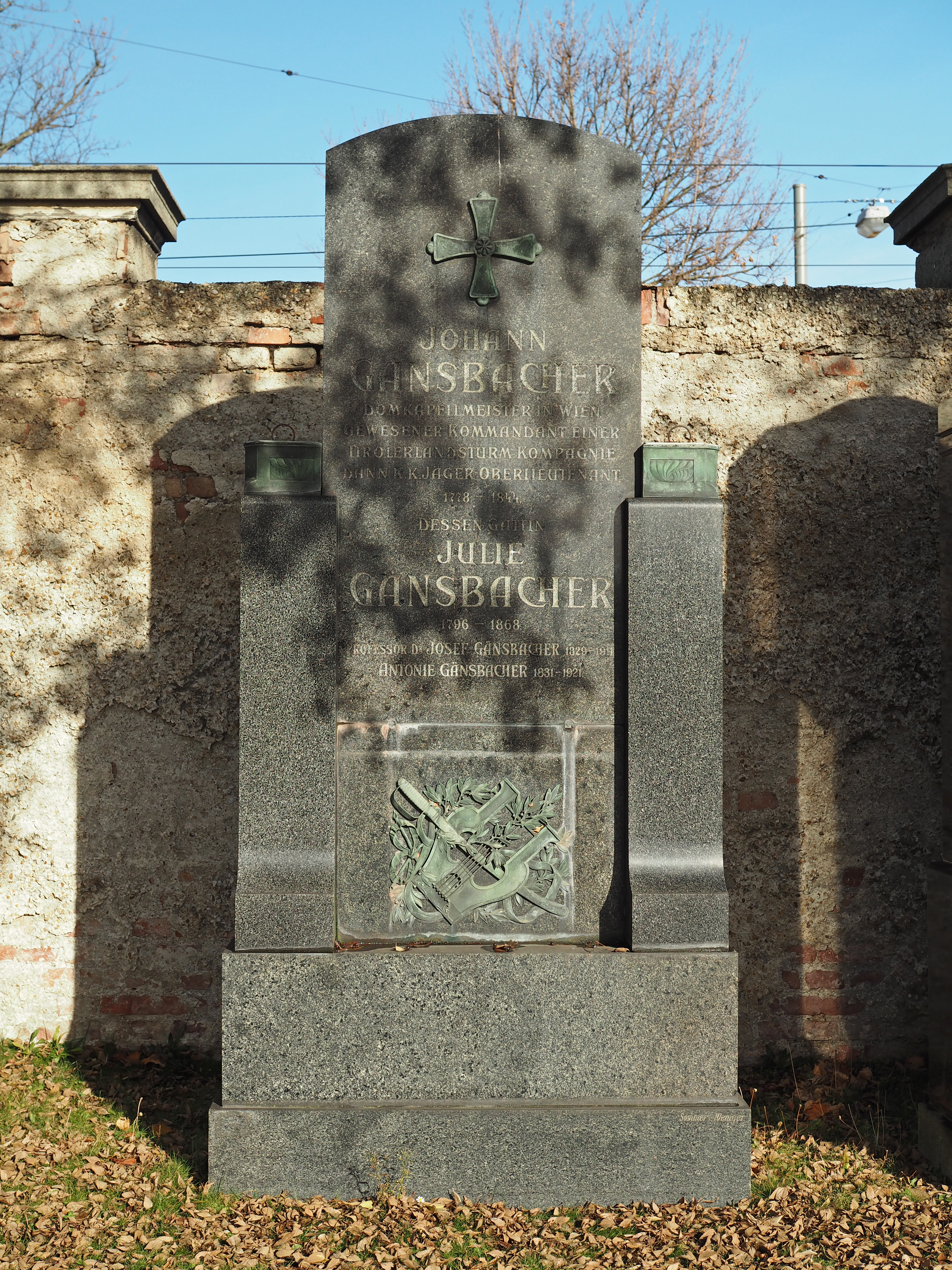
Grave of Josef Gänsbacher at the Vienna Central Cemetery

Gänsbacher was the son of the composer and conductor Johann Baptist Gänsbacher. He studied law at the University of Vienna. In 1855 he graduated with a doctorate in law. He took singing lessons from Giovanni Gentiluomo and Hollup. From 1863 to 1904 he was active as a singing teacher at the Gesellschaft der Musikfreunde. At his time he belonged to Vienna's most respected Stimmbildner. Leopold Demuth, Nikolaus Rothmühl and Marie Wilt were among his pupils.

Johannes Brahms dedicated his Cello Sonata No. 1 in E minor to him.

The mortal remains of Gänsbacher were buried in Vienna Central Cemetery near his father.
