= Romantische Oper =

Early nineteenth-century German opera genre

Romantische Oper (German for 'romantic opera') (Note: Plural: Romantische Opern) is a genre of early nineteenth-century German opera, developed not from the German Singspiel of the eighteenth-century but from the opéras comiques of the French Revolution. It offered opportunities for an increasingly important role for the orchestra, and greater dramatic possibilities for reminiscence motifs – phrases that are identified with a place, person or idea and which, when re-used in a work, remind the listener of the place, person or idea in question.

Carl Maria von Weber's Der Freischütz (1821) inaugurated the genre, which increasingly became associated with a distinctively German national style, as exemplified by composers such as Heinrich Marschner (e.g. Der Vampyr and Hans Heiling), Albert Lortzing (e.g. Undine) and Louis Spohr. Themes explored included nature, the supernatural, the Middle Ages and popular culture, specifically folklore. Musically, German folk music also served as an inspiration. Spoken dialogue continued to be used between musical numbers.

The genre reached its apogee in the early works of Richard Wagner, specifically Die Feen, Das Liebesverbot, The Flying Dutchman and Tannhäuser, although these differed from their predecessors in not using spoken dialogue. His later operas developed the reminiscence motif into the more protean Leitmotif and gradually abandoned many of the themes of romantische Oper, while still largely focused on myths, legends and nature.
