= Henry Prinsep =

English official of the Indian Civil Service and historian

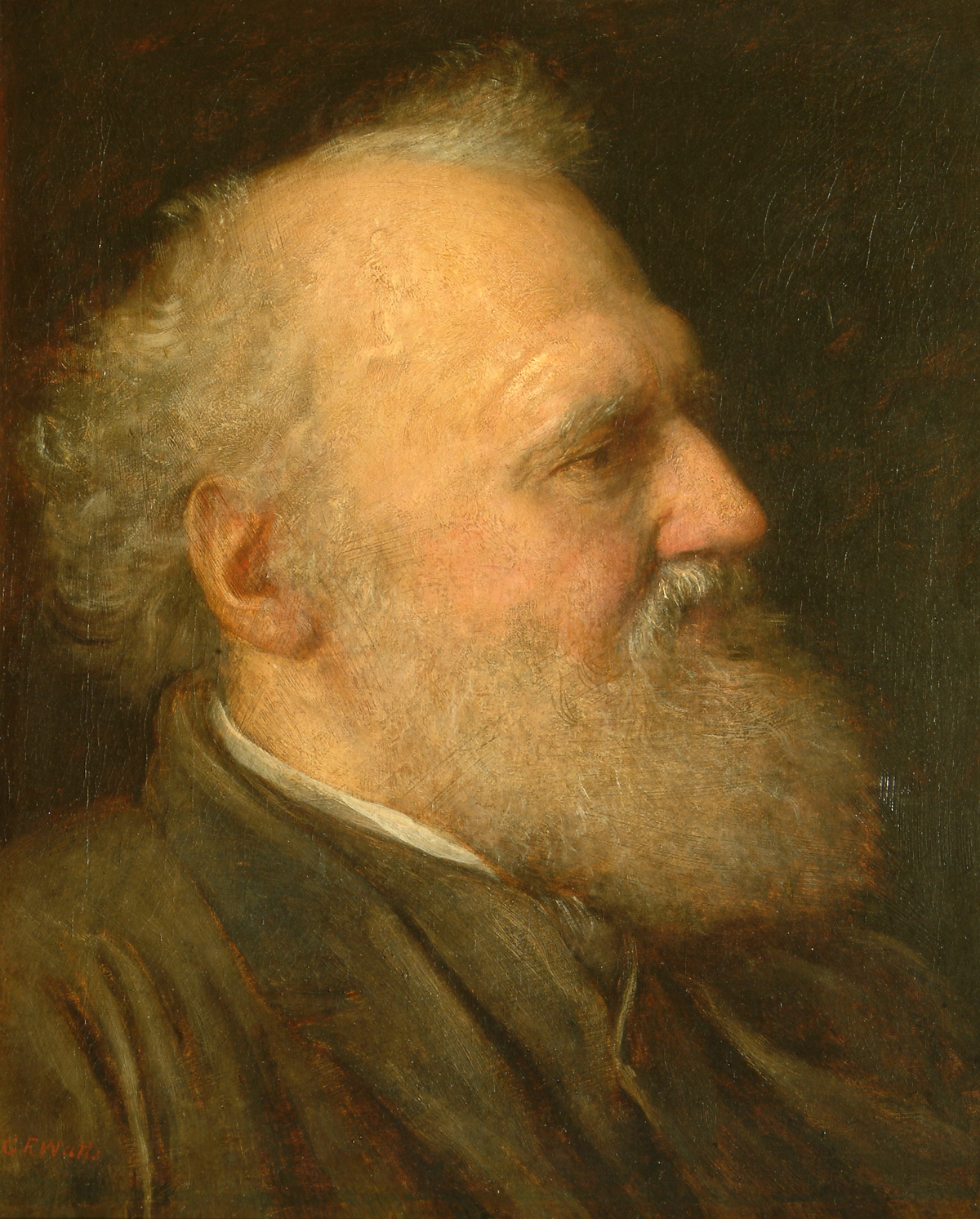
Henry Thoby Prinsep 1871 portrait by G. F. Watts

Henry Thoby Prinsep (15 July 1793 – 11 February 1878) was an English official of the Indian Civil Service, and historian of India. In later life he entered politics, and was a significant figure of the cultural circles of London.

== Early life ==
Prinsep was born at Thoby Priory, Essex, the fourth son of Sophia Elizabeth Auriol (1760–1850) and politician John Prinsep. Prior to his birth, his father had been active as a soldier and businessman in India returning to England in 1788 and settling at the Priory. His brothers were James Prinsep and the barrister Charles Robert Prinsep.

He was educated by a private tutor, and at the age of 13 joined Tonbridge School under Vicesimus Knox II, where he was placed in the sixth form. In 1807, having obtained a writership to Bengal, he entered the East India College, then at Hertford Castle.

== In India ==
Leaving the college in December 1808, Prinsep arrived at Calcutta on 20 July 1809, aged 16. After passing two years there, first as a student in Writers' Buildings, where he saw much of Holt Mackenzie, and then as an assistant in the office of the court of Sadr Adálat, be was sent to Murshidábad, where he was employed as assistant to the magistrate, and also as registrar, a dealing with petty suits. After serving in the Jungle Mehuls and in Bákarganj, Prinsep was appointed, in 1814, to a subordinate office in the secretariat, and a member of the suite of the governor-general, Lord Moira, whom he accompanied through Oudh and the North-Western Provinces. He was subsequently the first holder of the office of superintendent and remembrancer of legal affairs, protecting the interests of the government in the courts of the provinces; but was summoned to join the governor-general's camp during prolonged tours.

In 1819 and 1820, while still holding his permanent appointment, Prinsep was employed in special inquiries. An investigation into land tenures in Bardhaman district led to Regulation 8 of 1819 for Bengal. On 16 December 1820, he was appointed Persian secretary to government. When Lord William Bentinck conferred with Maharaja Ranjit Singh of the Sikh Empire in October 1831, at the Ropar Meeting, Prinsep was in attendance. He was appointed a member of council, first during a temporary vacancy in 1835, and five years later, when he was permanently appointed to the office. He finally retired from the service and left India in 1843.

He was District Grandmaster of Bengal.

== Later life ==
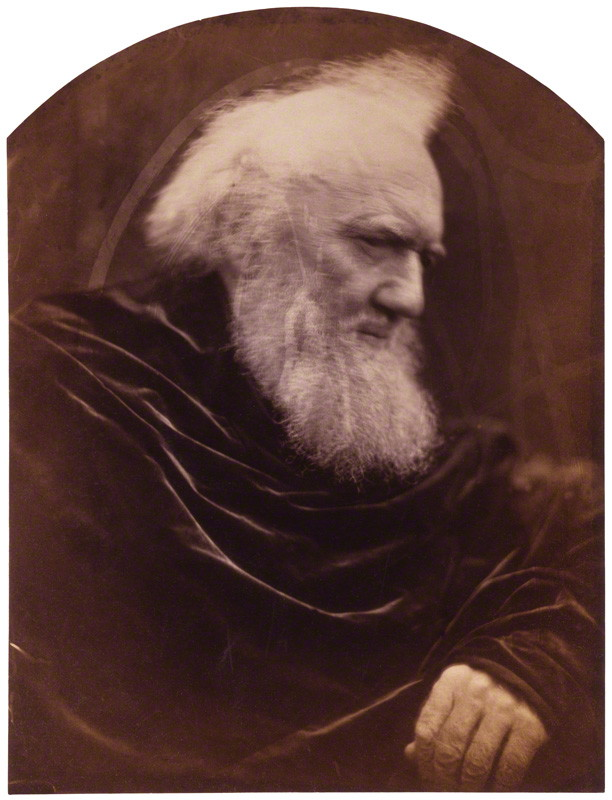
Henry Thoby Prinsep, photograph by Julia Margaret Cameron, 1866

On his return to England in 1843 Prinsep settled in London, where he was a member of the Carlton Club and the Athenæum Club. His ambition at that time was to enter the House of Commons, and he contested four constituencies as a Conservative candidate (Kilmarnock Burghs, Dartmouth, Dover and Harwich). At Harwich in March 1851 he was returned by a majority, was unseated by petition on technical grounds connected with his qualification, which were removed by the House of Commons. Harwich constituency was then much troubled with petitions against electoral corruption, barely surviving the scrutiny. Prinsep lost his seat in another 1851 election there, surrounded by further controversy.

Prinsep also canvassed for a seat in the court of directors of the East India Company, to which he was elected in 1850. When the number of directors was diminished under the Government of India Act 1853 (16 & 17 Vict. c. 95), he was one of those elected by ballot to retain their seats. In 1858, when the Council of India was established, he was one of the seven EIC directors appointed to the new body.

In the council of India, Prinsep recorded frequent dissents from the decisions of the secretary of state. He was opposed to some of the measures adopted after the Indian Rebellion of 1857. He disapproved of the abolition of the system of recruiting British troops for local service in India; and of the original scheme for the establishment of staff corps for India. He was opposed to the re-establishment of local government in Mysore, after it had been administered for 30 years by British officers. On financial grounds he deprecated the works to improve the navigation of the Godavari River. In his last year of office he recorded a protest against the adoption of the narrow gauge for Indian railways. He retired from the council in 1874.

Five or six years after returning from India, the Prinseps settled at Little Holland House, in Kensington. There he cultivated the society of artists: G. F. Watts was one of his most attached friends, and lived at Little Holland House for 25 years. Another friend was Edward Burne-Jones.

Prinsep died of bronchitis in 1878, at the house of G. F. Watts at Freshwater, Isle of Wight.

== Works ==
At the end of the Third Anglo-Maratha War, Prinsep obtained the permission of the governor-general to write A History of the Political and Military Transactions in India during the Administration of the Marquis of Hastings, i.e. from October 1813 to January 1823. Prinsep sent the completed manuscript to his elder brother, Charles Robert Prinsep. George Canning, President of the Board of Control, prohibited the publication, but Prinsep went ahead on his own responsibility, and John Murray brought out the book in 1823. The original edition was revised and republished in two volumes, when the author was in England on leave, in 1824. In 1865, he wrote a manuscript autobiographical sketch, in which he recorded his impressions of successive governors-general.

Prinsep wrote also works on: the origin of Sikh power in the Punjáb (1834); recent discoveries in Afghanistan (1844); social and political conditions of Tibet, Tartary, and Mongolia (1852). In 1853 he published a pamphlet on the India question, when the Charter Act was under discussion. He also, when in India, brought out Ramachandra Dasa's Register of the Bengal Civil Servants 1790–1842, accompanied by Actuarial Tables (Calcutta, 1844). In his old age he printed for private circulation Specimens of Ballad Poetry applied to the Tales and Traditions of the East.

== Family ==
On 14 May 1835, he and Sara Monckton (1816–1887), daughter of James Pattle of the Bengal civil service, were married. Together they had one daughter and three sons:

- Alice Marie Prinsep, who married Charles Gurney, son of Daniel Gurney (1791–1880)
- Sir Henry Thoby Prinsep, a judge of the high court at Calcutta, in March 1904, he was made a Knights Commander of India (KCIE).
- Valentine Cameron Prinsep, RA
- Arthur Haldimand Prinsep CB, major-general of the Bengal cavalry
