= Ursula Schröder-Feinen =

German operatic soprano (1936–2005)

- Ursula Schroder-Feinen, in the 1970s
- Born: 21 July 1936; Gelsenkirchen
- Died: 9 February 2005 (aged 68); Hennef, North Rhine-Westphalia, Germany
- Occupation: Dramatic soprano
- Organizations: Bayreuth Festival; Deutsche Oper am Rhein
- Awards: Litteris et Artibus

Ursula Schröder-Feinen (21 July 1936 – 9 February 2005) was a German operatic dramatic soprano who performed internationally, including at the Metropolitan Opera and the Bayreuth Festival.

== Life and career ==
She was born in Gelsenkirchen, where she studied voice with Maria Helm. Later she studied at the Folkwangschule in Essen. From 1958 she sang in the opera chorus of her hometown. In 1961 her career as a soloist began with singing the title role of Verdi's Aida. She was a member of the ensemble of the Deutsche Oper am Rhein from 1968 to 1972.

She performed at the Edinburgh Festival, the Vienna State Opera and at La Scala. She appeared as a guest at the Deutsche Oper Berlin, in Leipzig, Geneve, Strasbourg, Copenhagen, Prague and Amsterdam, among others.

Her debut at the Metropolitan Opera was in 1970 as Chrysothemis in Elektra by Richard Strauss, alongside Birgit Nilsson and Regina Resnik, conducted by Karl Böhm. She performed there Brünnhilde in Wagner's Siegfried in 1972, in the title roles of Salome (1973) and Elektra (1976), and in 1978 as the Dyer's wife in Die Frau ohne Schatten by Richard Strauss.

At the Bayreuth Festival, she appeared as Senta in Der fliegende Holländer from 1971 to 1975, Brünnhilde in Siegfried in 1973, Ortrud in Lohengrin in 1972, and Kundry in Parsifal in 1975.

At the Salzburg Festival, she portrayed the Dyer's wife in 1975, with Leonie Rysanek, James King, Ruth Hesse and Walter Berry, with Böhm conducting the Vienna Philharmonic.

In 1970, she sang the role of Kundry at the Rome Opera in 1970. Her performance was described:

As Kundry, Schröder-Feinen is remarkable in her ability not only to perform the role well, but to imbue it with a vocal characterization that emerges on a recording and not just on stage. Her voice is suited to the role, not only for the demands that the role poses, but in the intensity with which she approaches the entirety of the second act. This performance benefits from a freshness and spontaneity often hoped for a Kundry to embody. ... Vocally, Schröder-Feinen triumphs in her execution of the act with elan.

In 1973, she performed the title role of Salome in the Canadian premiere of the opera. She sang the role also at the Edinburgh Festival. In 1974, she appeared as the Dyer's wife at the Salzburg Festival. In 1977, she performed the title role of Elektra at the Vienna State Opera, conducted by Horst Stein, alongside Gwyneth Jones as Chrysothemis, Christa Ludwig as Klytämnestra, Theo Adam as Orest and Hans Beirer as Aegisth. She appeared as Isolde, and performed the title roles of Puccini's Tosca and Turandot, Gluck's Alceste and Janáček's Jenůfa. She retired in the late 1970s.

Schröder-Feinen died in 2005 in Hennef, near Bonn.

== Recordings ==
Schröder-Feinen's voice is heard in live recordings, excerpts from Marschner's Hans Heiling, conducted by George Alexander Albrecht, from Lohengrin (with Anna Tomowa-Sintow, René Kollo, Siegmund Nimsgern, Robert Kerns and Karl Ridderbusch, Herbert von Karajan conducting the Berlin Philharmonic, the aria of Rezia from Weber's Oberon, conducted by Rafael Kubelík, and from Die Frau ohne Schatten in Salzburg 1975.

A collection of recordings from the Deutsche Oper am Rhein includes Leonore's aria "Abscheulicher! Wo eilst du hin?" from Fidelio, the "Erzählung" of Sieglinde from Die Walküre, and excerpts from a 1973 performance of Elektra with Schröder-Feinen in the title role and Astrid Varnay as Klytämnestra.
