= Augustus Prinsep =

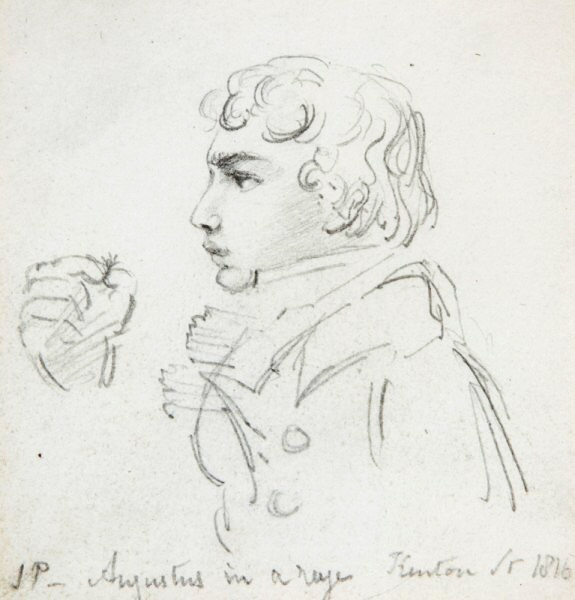
Pencil sketch of Augustus Prinsep by his brother James Prinsep, 1816. The drawing is captioned "Augustus in a Rage. Kenton [Street, Bloomsbury, London]".

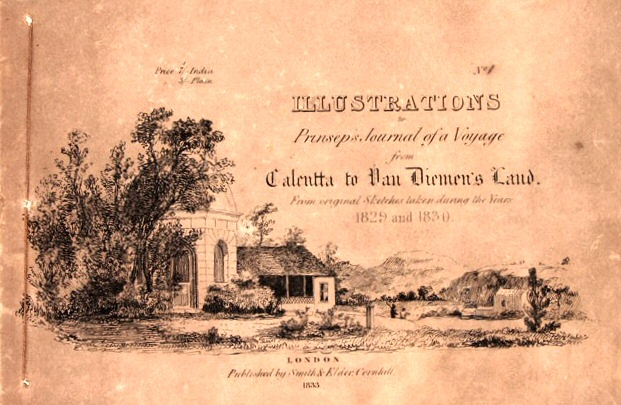
Title-page of Illustrations for Prinsep's Journal of a Voyage from Calcutta to Van Diemen's Land, 1833

Augustus Prinsep (31 March 1803 – 10 October 1830) was an English artist, writer, and civil servant. He is best known for his posthumous book, The Journal of a Voyage from Calcutta to Van Diemen's Land.

== Life ==
Prinsep, born in London, was the eighth and youngest son of Sophia Elizabeth Auriol (1760–1850) and John Prinsep. He was educated at Haileybury College. He went to India, arriving in Calcutta in July 1822. He worked as a clerk with the East India Company in Calcutta. In 1827 he was promoted to commissioner of Pergunnah Palamow. He married Elizabeth Acworth Ommanney in June 1828. He was diagnosed with consumption and advised by his doctors to leave India. He decided to emigrate to Australia, recording his travels in his journal and letters to his wife. He reached Hobart, Van Diemen's Land (Tasmania) in September 1829 via Batavia, Dutch East Indies (Indonesia). He died at sea on a further voyage made in the hope of recuperating his health, and his wife published his journal as a book, The Journal of a Voyage from Calcutta to Van Diemen's Land.

The Spectator commented that "This is the pleasantest little book we have lately received concerning foreign parts. Its form is unpretending; its price is next to nothing; but it is full of matter, and the author was a man of no mean authority in the East." It described his report as "peculiarly valuable" since he was "a thoroughly impartial observer".

== Works ==
- The Journal of a Voyage from Calcutta to Van Diemen's Land: Comprising a Description of that Colony During a Six Months' Residence. From Original Letters, Selected by Mrs A. Prinsep, Smith, Elder, And Co., 1833.
