= Hans Heiling =

Opera by Heinrich Marschner

- Opera by Heinrich Marschner
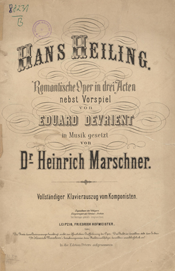
- Score
- Librettist: Eduard Devrient
- Language: German
- Based on: folk legend
- Premiere: 24 May 1833; Königliche Hofoper, Berlin

Hans Heiling is a German Romantic opera in 3 acts with prologue by Heinrich Marschner with a libretto by Eduard Devrient, who also sang the title role at the première at the Königliche Hofoper (now Berlin State Opera), Berlin, on 24 May 1833. From there, the work went on to become Marschner's most successful opera. The opera brought the composer a considerable reputation, although this did not materially affect his position in Hanover, where he was music director of the Court Theatre. Like Marschner's other great success, Der Vampyr, the plot of Hans Heiling makes great use of supernatural elements. As with several of his operas, Hans Heiling is based on a folk legend.

== Roles ==
Role	Voice type	Premiere cast, 24 May 1833 (Conductor: H. Marschner)
Queen of the Erdgeister ("Earth spirits")	soprano	Johanna Lehmann
Hans Heiling, her son	baritone	Eduard Devrient
Anna, his bride	soprano	Therese Grünbaum
Gertrud, her mother	alto	Henriette Valentini
Konrad, a hunter and Anna’s sweetheart	tenor	Karl Adam Bader
Stephan, a blacksmith	bass	?
Niklas, a tailor	tenor	Gustav Becker

== Synopsis ==
Place: Bohemian part of the Ore Mountains
Time: 14th century.

=== Prologue ===
After falling in love with the mortal Anna, Hans Heiling plans to leave the underworld empire of the Erdgeister to wed her. Ignoring the attempts of his mother the Queen to persuade him to stay, he takes some jewels and a magic book enabling him to retain power over his underworld subjects.

=== Act 1 ===
Scene 1

Heiling ascends to the earth to find his would-be bride. Heiling finds Anna and her mother, who encourages Anna to accept the advances of the rich stranger. During a moment alone Anna looks inside Heiling's book, which immediately fills her with terror. Heiling burns the book on her demand and reluctantly accompanies Anna to the village festival.

Scene 2

There are many people in the tavern drinking, dancing and singing. Stephan and Niklas are joined by Konrad, who has loved Anna for a long time. Anna and Heiling arrive and Konrad asks to dance with Anna. Heiling objects angrily but Anna ignores him; and reminding him that they are not yet married, walks away with Konrad.

=== Act 2 ===
Scene 1

Anna wanders through a forest on her way home. She has realised that she loves Konrad, but she remains Heiling's bride to be. Suddenly the Queen appears and beseeches the girl to release her son, who is not a human being but a prince of the underworld. Anna faints and upon discovering her, Konrad takes Anna home.

Scene 2

Heiling approaches Anna in her house, offering his jewellery to win her over, but it is returned by Anna who now knows of its origin. In a rage, Heiling stabs Konrad before running away.

=== Act 3 ===
Scene 1

Heiling returns to the realm of the Erdgeister. He summons his former subjects, only to be reminded that without his book he has lost his power. He then finds out that Konrad is not dead, and is to be wed to Anna the next day. In his despair, he throws himself on the ground, and seeing that Heiling has lost so much, his subjects swear fealty to him again. With the news of the wedding in his mind, he returns to the earth to take revenge with his new-found powers.

Scene 2

Konrad and Anna are wed in a forest chapel. Heiling approaches and seizes the hand of Anna, who pleads for mercy. Konrad rushes to help his wife, but his knife shatters as he strikes Heiling. Heiling summons the Erdgeister to destroy all the people, but then the Queen appears. She persuades Heiling to reconcile, and they then return to the underworld.

== Music ==
A pivotal opera between Weber and Wagner, Hans Heiling's structure is highly original. The overture to act 1 does not open the opera as it conventionally would — there is instead a prologue before the overture begins after which the curtain descends, and the overture is played during a change of scenery.

Heiling's aria from the first act, An jenem Tag (On that fair day), still has recordings and performances in concert both in Germany and abroad and is generally regarded as the gem of the score. Also of worth are the Queen's aria, O bleib bei mir (O stay with me); the first act finale; Anna's scena and aria, Einst war so tiefer Freude (Once was such deep contentment); Conrad and Anna's duet, Ha! dieses Wort (Ha! Such a word) and Heiling's conjuration, Herauf (Appear).

It is worth mentioning here that the theme from the Queen's aria in 2nd act (to the words: Sonst bist du verfallen...) was later on used by Wagner in his Die Walküre, act 2, when that slightly modified leitmotif is repeated many times in the scene of Brünnhilde's apparition to Siegmund, their mutual questions and answers. Albeit a very rare example of borrowing in the case of Wagner, even he was not always absolutely unique.

== Recordings ==
- Marie-Luise Gilles, Heikki Siukola, Ursula Schröder-Feinen, Bernd Weikl, Gerti Zeumer, RAI Symphony Orchestra Turin & Chorus, conductor George Alexander Albrecht. CD, June 1972. Gala Records GLA 730, UPC 675754665821
- Marianne Eklof, Magdaléna Hajóssyová, Karl Markus, Thomas Mohr, Ladislav Neshyba, Jan Rozehnal, Eva Seniglova, Slovak Philharmonic Orchestra & Chorus, conductor Ewald Körner. CD, recorded 1992, Naxos Records 8.223306-07 (Marco Polo imprint).
- Hans Franzen, Harald Meister, Hermann Prey, Hetty Plümacher, Liane Synek, Leonore Kirschstein, et al. WDR Symphony Orchestra Cologne & Chorus, conductor Joseph Keilberth. CD, live performance July 1966, Köln. Opera d’Oro, UPC 723724387027
- Markus Werba, Anna Caterina Antonacci, Herbert Lippert, Gabriele Fontana, Cornelia Wulkopf, Nicola Ebau, Brian Garth Nickel, Teatro Lirico di Cagliari & Chorus, conductor Renato Palumbo. DVD, 26 July 2005. Dynamic 33467, UPC 675754849825
