= Carl August Benjamin Siegel =

German architecture professor and chief of works

Carl August Benjamin Siegel (27 April 1757, Dresden – 15 October 1832, Dresden) was a German architecture professor and chief of works, active in Leipzig and Dresden.

== Life and work ==
Siegel received his education in Dresden as a student of Friedrich August Krubsacius and Gottlob August Hölzer. This was followed in Leipzig from 1785 by employment as a teacher of architectural drawing at the Academy of Art (now the Academy of Visual Arts). He then became a full professor and was head of the Department of Architectural Art until 1823. He also served as a university architect in Leipzig. After 1823, he became a professor and head of the building school at the Dresden Academy of Art. In Dresden, the Brücknersche Haus was built in 1825 according to his designs on the corner plot Bautzener Platz/Alaungasse.
