= Hans Heiling (mythology) =

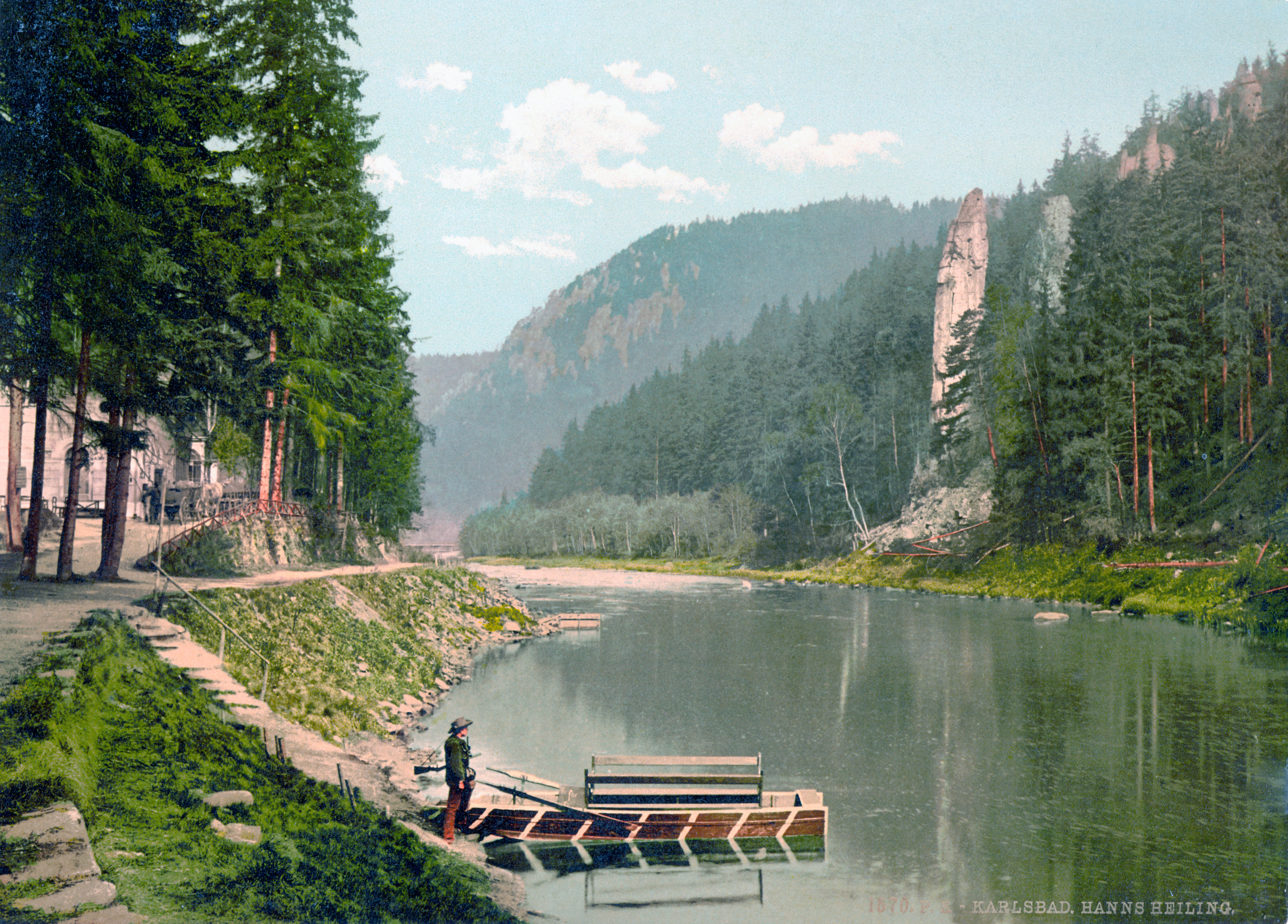
Hans-Heiling-Felsen

Hans Heiling (Jan Svatoš in Czech) is a legendary person in German and Bohemian folklore.

The legends originate from German inhabitants of Loket (now in the Czech Republic). He was allegedly the son of a water sprite from the river Ohře who taught him to master magic and command spirits. Once he had become rich and powerful, he ordered the spirits under his command to build a great city. The granite rocks above the Ohře, named Hans-Heiling-Felsen in German and Svatošské Skály in Czech, were believed to be the ruins of this city. When Hans Heiling discovered that he could not achieve human happiness even with his supernatural powers, he discarded them and died fighting a bear. Another variant of the story is that the rock formation is a petrified wedding party. A notable opera of the same name was inspired by the tale.

The poem "Ballad" by Gerda Mayer is based on the wedding party variant and appears in The Oxford Book of Story Poems.
