= John Prinsep =

British merchant (1748–1830)

Arrival of civil servant in Calcutta, by William Prinsep, son of John Prinsep

John Prinsep (23 April 1748 – 30 November 1830) was born the son of a vicar in rural Oxfordshire, England. With limited horizons for advancement, he joined the East India Company as a cadet, travelling to Bombay, and was soon engaged in mercantile pursuits, eventually becoming the earliest British merchant to plant indigo, and becoming extremely wealthy in the process. Prinsep subsequently returned to England, where he became a London alderman and a member of parliament, but he eventually lost both large fortunes he created. He was the progenitor of an Anglo-Indian family of merchants, all of whom were artistically gifted.

== Life ==
John Prinsep was born on 23 April 1748, the son of Rev. John Prinsep, BA graduate of Balliol College, Oxford and vicar of Bicester, Oxfordshire. The young Prinsep arrived in Bombay in 1771 as a cadet, shortly after the arrival of Warren Hastings as the first Governor-General of Bengal.

The vicar's son and former London cloth merchant arrived in Calcutta with almost nothing to his name. "I landed with my baggage at the Custom House," Prinsep recalled in an unpublished memoir, "and proceeded to the 'Punch House' in the Bazaar with ten guineas that I had borrowed from my friend to bear my expenses till I should have presented myself to the Fort Major." It was an inauspicious beginning, but like so many other English arrivals in India, it was fraught with the frisson of Empire and ambition.

In spite of being nearly penniless, Prinsep arrived with a valuable commodity: letters of introduction. Soon, he discovered, Calcutta was not London. "I could not help being surprised at the hospitality offered me," Prinsep later wrote, "for, once respectably introduced, I found myself at home everywhere. No formality, no stiffness or reserve, everybody happy to receive the stranger." The point of view would be echoed by the English ever since, down to E. M. Forster.

Prinsep was apparently distracted by commercial opportunities almost on arrival. He never joined the Army, and resigned his commission in 1772, the year after his arrival in India. A servant of the East India Company, Prinsep became close friends with Warren Hastings, an opportune relationship which served him well. It was his friend Hastings who first secured for Prinsep his lucrative hold on the production of indigo.

The young Prinsep lost his father and two of his sisters to an outbreak of fever in 1768. By then Prinsep seems to have taken up employment in the cotton trade of the East India Company, having worked before his arrival in India in several London merchant houses specialising in fabrics. Within a few years, though, Prinsep discovered indigo. In 1779, Prinsep introduced the cultivation and manufacture of indigo at a factory (plantation) located in Nilgang, near Baraset. Indigo was also being grown in South Carolina for export to England as textile dye, but Prinsep's establishment of the Indian indigo business, simultaneously with the Revolutionary War having slashed American indigo export to England, meant that the Indian producers soon controlled the market.

The business was apparently profitable from the outset, to the extent that within a year Prinsep opened a copper mint at Pulta in 1780 under authority of the government, after he and Alexander Cunningham discovered the copper mines at Rotasgarh, producing the first copper coinage in India. Prinsep also traded on his background in the textile business, opening a cotton fabric printing plant in Bengal, as well as acting for ten years as the chintz contractor for the East India Company, an enormously successful venture. (The chintz venture involved adapting British calico-making techniques to making a cloth called chintz.)

In a few years, Prinsep's near-monopoly had made the country vicar's son one of the wealthiest men in India. In 1782 he married Sophia Elizabeth Auriol (1760–1850), sister of James Peter Auriol, secretary to government during Warren Hastings' administration. She was a descendant of an old French Huguenot family from Chartres.

By 1773, Prinsep's connections had paid off: he was named an Alderman of the Mayor's Court. For some years afterwards Prinsep's legendary business acumen, first proved to the East India Company when he was still in the fabric business in England and gave advice on improving the Company's fabric business, resulted in his being named Assistant Superintendent of Investments for the Company. By this time Prinsep had set himself up in regal digs in the village of Monirampur close to the Phulta waterworks which supplied Calcutta with drinking water.

As soon as Prinsep began generating returns on his early investments, he did what other successful English merchants had done: he bought the ships with which he traded. No longer would he be at the mercy of the shipping fleet.

By 1788, Prinsep left India and decamped for home, arriving in London with an enormous £40,000 fortune – primarily derived from his indigo ventures – which he used to set himself up in business as an East India agent and Italian silk merchant, a step made easier by his role as an East India Company shareholder. Back in England, Prinsep proved to be a vocal, if not particularly subtle, advocate for the unencumbered rights of English merchants. One tract he authored in 1793, for instance, was entitled: "The right in the West India merchants to a Double Monopoly of the Sugar Market and the Expedience of all Monopolies Examined."

Prinsep simultaneously urged a government policy of opening up the India market to the free competition of British merchants, a policy eventually adopted, but one which he was not able to participate in due to financial reversals resulting from the market crisis occasioned at the end of the American War of Independence.

In 1780, Prinsep wrote to Lord North while still in Calcutta "outlining his intention of introducing indigo, sugar and tobacco into Britain from South Asia", wrote historian H. V. Bowen in his The Business of Empire. "He did so with the belief that a 'richer tribute may by such means be drawn from Bengal than is furnished by the present almost worn out system of investing it in manufactures which are every day falling in estimation at home since European industry has adopted such variety of imitation and improvement on the fabricks of the East."

Prinsep continued to write, sometimes under pseudonyms, to put across his political views. In modern parlance, he would probably be called a 'spinner,' so anxious was he to advance his economic and social agenda.

John Prinsep subsequently launched himself on an auspicious political career, as well as purchasing an enormous frescoed mansion at 147 Leadenhall Street, London, which would later become part of the East India Company's offices, as well as Thoby Priory in Essex.

Back in London, Prinsep became one of the founders of the Westminster Life Assurance Society. He served as MP for Queenborough, Kent, from 1802–06, as a London alderman from 1804–09, and, following financial reverses, as High Bailiff for Southwark from 1817–24. Prinsep also served as Master of the Worshipful Company of Skinners of London.

Prinsep died in London on 30 November 1830. He was survived by seven sons, most of whom became Anglo-Indian merchants and English businessmen, artists and gentlemen farmers. All seven attained official positions of authority while still in India, including Henry Thoby Prinsep who served as a director of the East India Company. Henry's son Val Prinsep, and John's youngest son Augustus Prinsep were notable artists.

Prinsep and his wife had eight sons and three daughters.

Prinsep Ghat in today's Kolkata is named after James Prinsep, the noted philologist and Indologist who first deciphered the Brahmi script.

== See also ==
- Croxall Hall, Prinsep
