= James Prinsep =

English orientalist and antiquary (1799–1840)

James Prinsep FRS
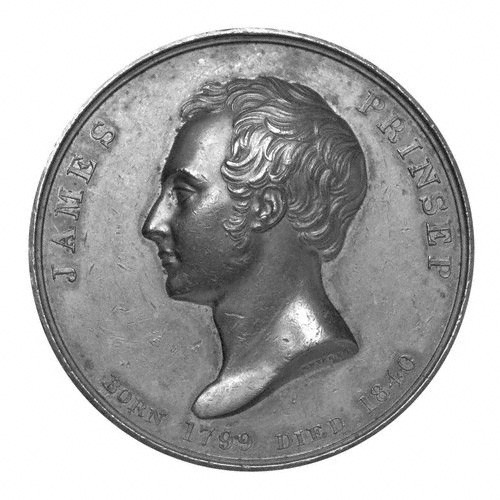
- James Prinsep in medal cast c. 1840 from the National Portrait Gallery
- Born: 20 August 1799; England
- Died: 22 April 1840 (aged 40); London, England

Academic work
- Main interests: Numismatics, Philology, Metallurgy and Meteorology
- Notable works: Journal of the Asiatic Society of Bengal
- Notable ideas: Deciphering Brahmi and Kharosthi scripts

James Prinsep FRS (20 August 1799 – 22 April 1840) was an English scholar, orientalist, and antiquary. He was the founding editor of the Journal of the Asiatic Society of Bengal and is best remembered for deciphering the Kharosthi and Brahmi scripts of ancient India. He studied, documented, and illustrated many aspects of numismatics, metallurgy, and meteorology apart from pursuing his career in India as an assay master at the mint in Benares.

== Early life ==
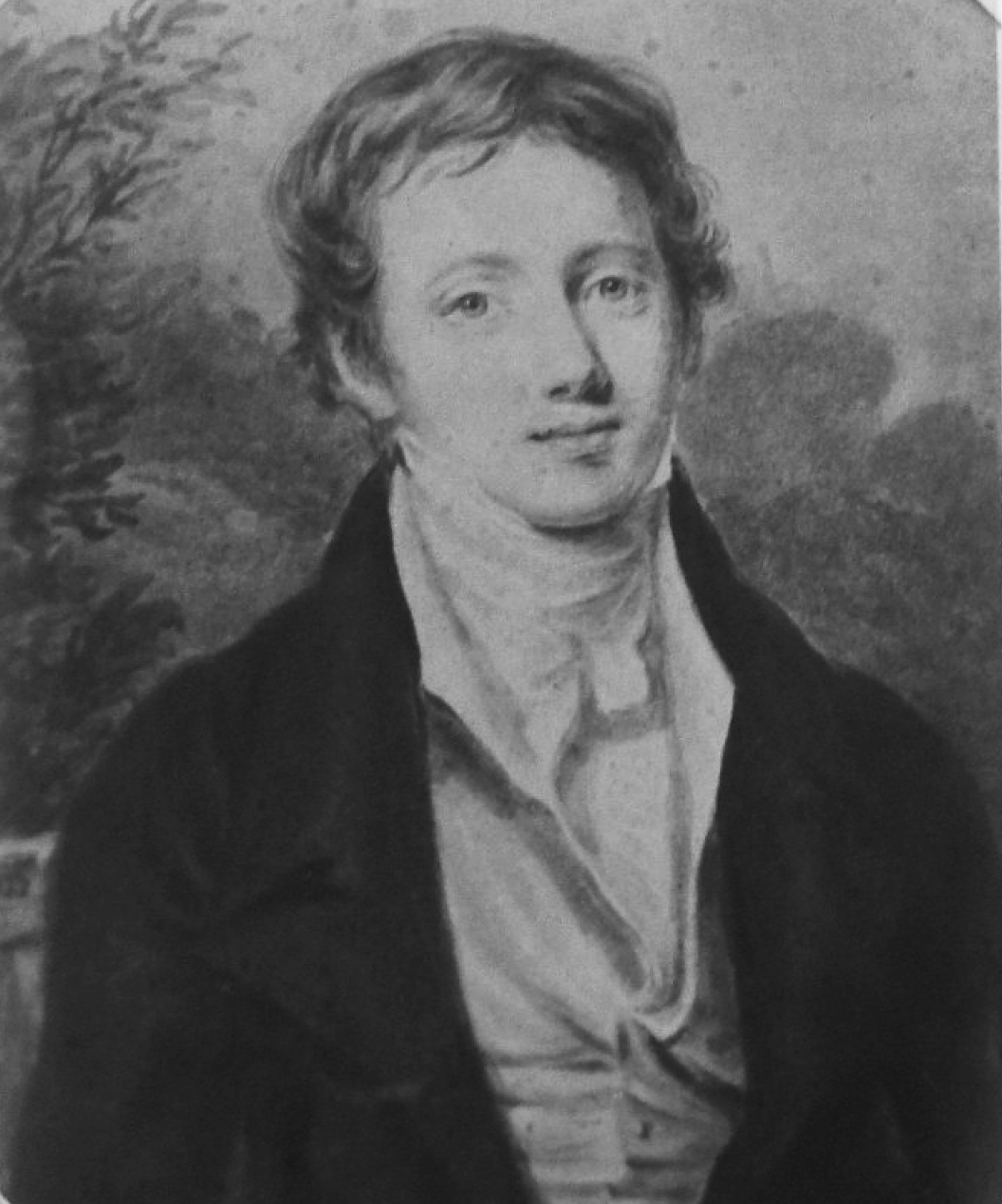
Young James drawn by his sister Emily

James Prinsep was the seventh son and the tenth child of John Prinsep (1746–1830) and his wife, Sophia Elizabeth Auriol (1760–1850). John Prinsep went to India in 1771 with almost no money and became a successful indigo planter. He returned to England in 1787 with a fortune of £40,000 and established himself as an East India merchant. He moved to Clifton in 1809 after incurring losses. His connections helped him find work for all his sons and several members of the Prinsep family rose to high positions in India. John Prinsep later became a member of parliament. James initially went to study in a school in Clifton run by a Mr. Bullock but learnt more at home from his older siblings. He showed a talent for detailed drawing and mechanical invention and this made him study architecture under the gifted but eccentric Augustus Pugin. His eyesight, however, declined due to an infection and he was unable to take up architecture as a profession. His father knew of an opening in the assay department at the mint in India and sent him to train in chemistry at Guy's Hospital and later as an apprentice to Robert Bingley, assay master at the Royal Mint in London (1818–19).

== Career in India ==
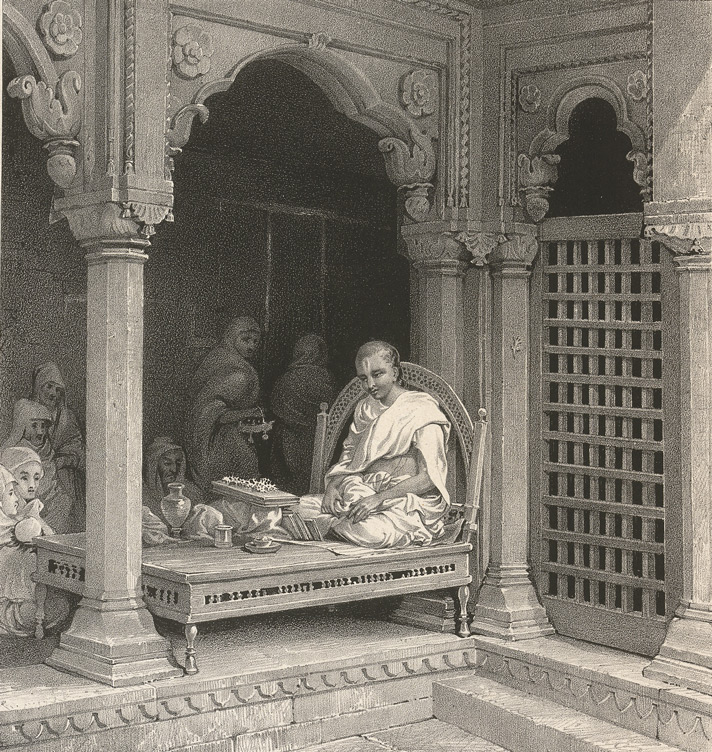
A Preacher Expounding The Poorans. In The Temple of Unn Poorna, Benares. Lithograph by Prinsep (1835)

Prinsep found a position as an assay master at the Calcutta mint and reached Calcutta along with his brother Henry Thoby on 15 September 1819. Within a year at Calcutta, he was sent by his superior, the eminent orientalist Horace Hayman Wilson, to work as assay master at the Benares mint. He stayed at Benares until the closure of that mint in 1830. He subsequently moved back to Calcutta as deputy assay master, and when Wilson resigned in 1832, he was made assay master (overruling Wilson's nominee for that position, James Atkinson) at the new silver mint designed in Greek revival style by Major W. N. Forbes.

His work as assay master led him to conduct many scientific studies. He worked on means for measuring high temperatures in furnaces accurately. The publication of his technique in the Philosophical Transactions of the Royal Society of London in 1828 led to his election as a Fellow of the Royal Society. He suggested the possibility of visual pyrometric measurement using a calibrated series of mica plates as well as using the thermal expansion of platinum but considered that a practical approach was to use calibrated combinations of platinum, gold and silver alloys placed in a cupel or crucible and observe their melting. He also described a pyrometer that measured the expansion of a small amount of air held within a gold bulb. In 1833 he called for reforms to Indian weights and measures and advocated a uniform coinage based on the new silver rupee of the East India Company. He also devised a balance so sensitive as to measure three-thousandth of a grain (≈0.19 mg).

=== Architecture ===
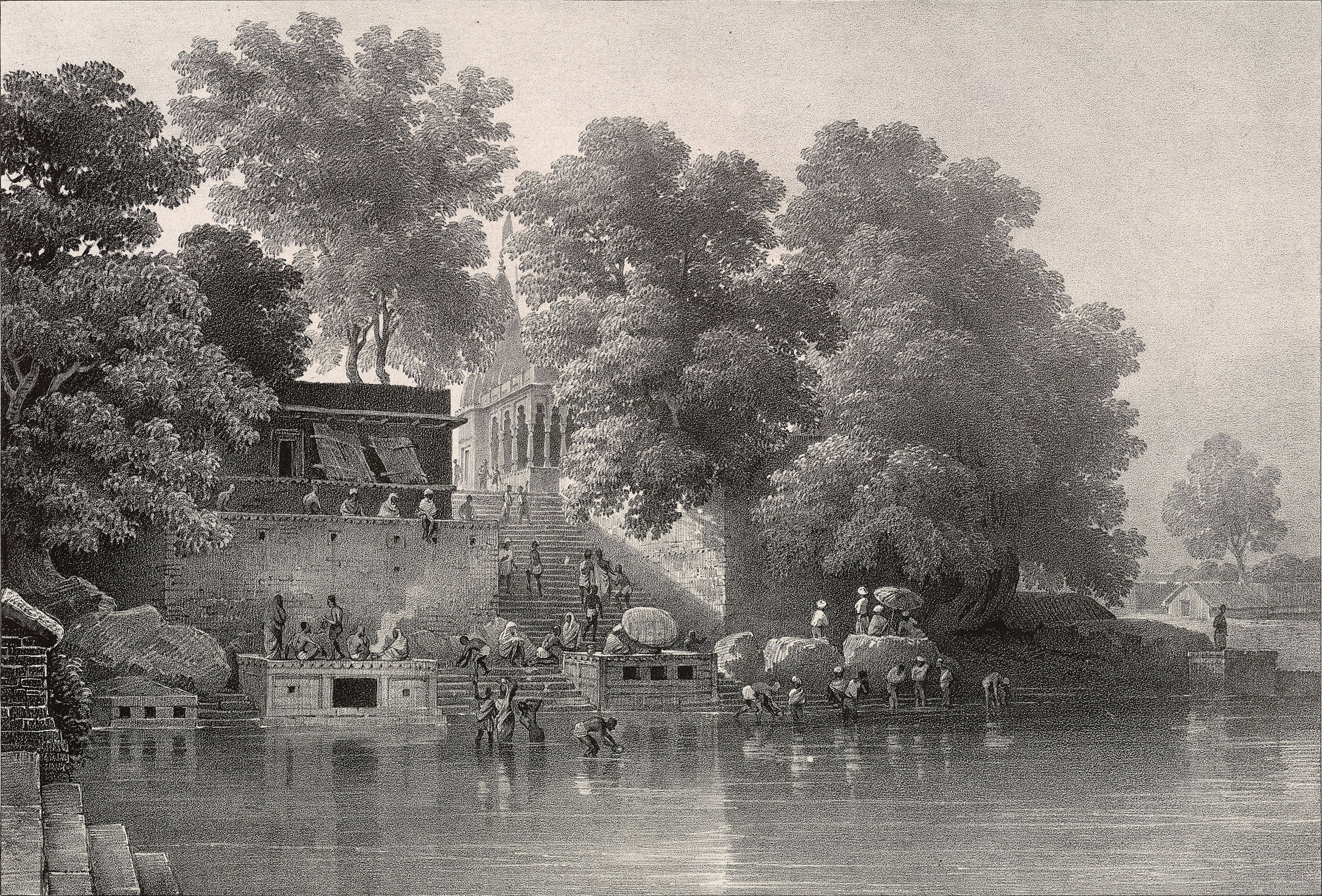
Lithograph of Kupuldhara Tulao, Benares by Prinsep (1834)

James Prinsep continued to take an interest in architecture at Benares. Regaining his eyesight, he studied and illustrated temple architecture, designed the new mint building at Benares as well as a church. In 1822 he conducted a survey of Benares and produced an accurate map at the scale of 8 inches to a mile. This map was lithographed in England. He also painted a series of watercolours of monuments and festivities in Benares which were sent to London in 1829 and published between 1830 and 1834 as Benares Illustrated, in a Series of Drawings. He helped design an arched tunnel to drain stagnant lakes and improve the sanitation of the densely populated areas of Benares and built a stone bridge over the Karamansa river. He helped restore the minarets of Aurangzeb which were in a state of collapse. When he moved to Calcutta, he offered to help complete a canal that had been planned by his brother Thomas but left incomplete by the latter's death in 1830. Thomas's canal linked the River Hooghly with branches of the Ganges further to the east.

=== Asiatic Society of Bengal ===
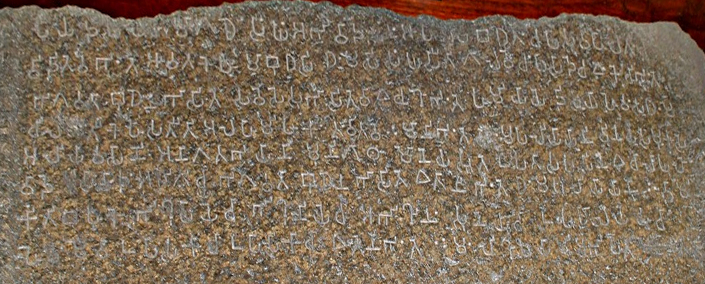
Bairat inscription, on which Prinsep worked to decipher Brahmi. On display in the Asiatic Society. See commemorative plate in honour of James Prinsep.

In 1829, Captain James D. Herbert started a serial called Gleanings in Science. Captain Herbert, however, was posted as Astronomer to the King of Oudh in 1830, leaving the journal to the editorship of James Prinsep, who was himself the primary contributor to it. In 1832 he succeeded H. H. Wilson as secretary of the Asiatic Society of Bengal and suggested that the Society should take over Gleanings in Science and produce the Journal of the Asiatic Society. Prinsep became the founding editor of this journal and contributed articles on chemistry, mineralogy, numismatics and on the study of Indian antiquities. He was also very interested in meteorology and the tabulation of observations and the analysis of weather data from across the country. He worked on the calibration of instruments to measure humidity and atmospheric pressure. He continued to edit the journal until his illness in 1838 which led to his leaving India and subsequently his death. Many of the plates in the journal were illustrated by him.

=== Numismatist ===
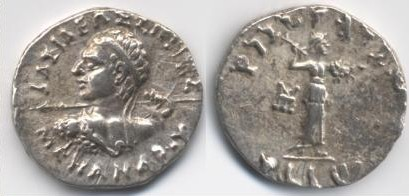
Prinsep used bilingual Indo-Greek coins to decipher Kharoshthi. Obverse and reverse legends in Greek "Basileos Sotēros Menandroy" and Kharosthi "Maharaja Tratasa Menandrasa": "Of The Saviour King Menander".

Coins were Prinsep's first interest. He interpreted coins from Bactria and Kushan as well as Indian series coins, including "punch-marked" ones from the Gupta series. Prinsep suggested that there were three stages; the punch-marked, the die-struck, and the cast coins. Prinsep also reported upon the native punch-marked coinage, noting that they were better known in eastern India.

=== Brahmi script philologist ===
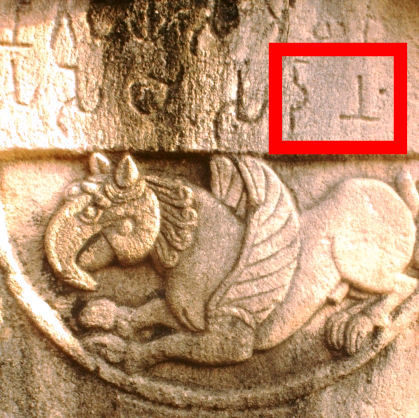
The last two letters at the end of this inscriptions in Brahmi were guessed to form the word "dǎnam" (donation), which appears at the end of most inscriptions at Sanchi and Bharhut. This hypothesis permitted the complete decipherment of the Brahmi script by James Prinsep in 1837.

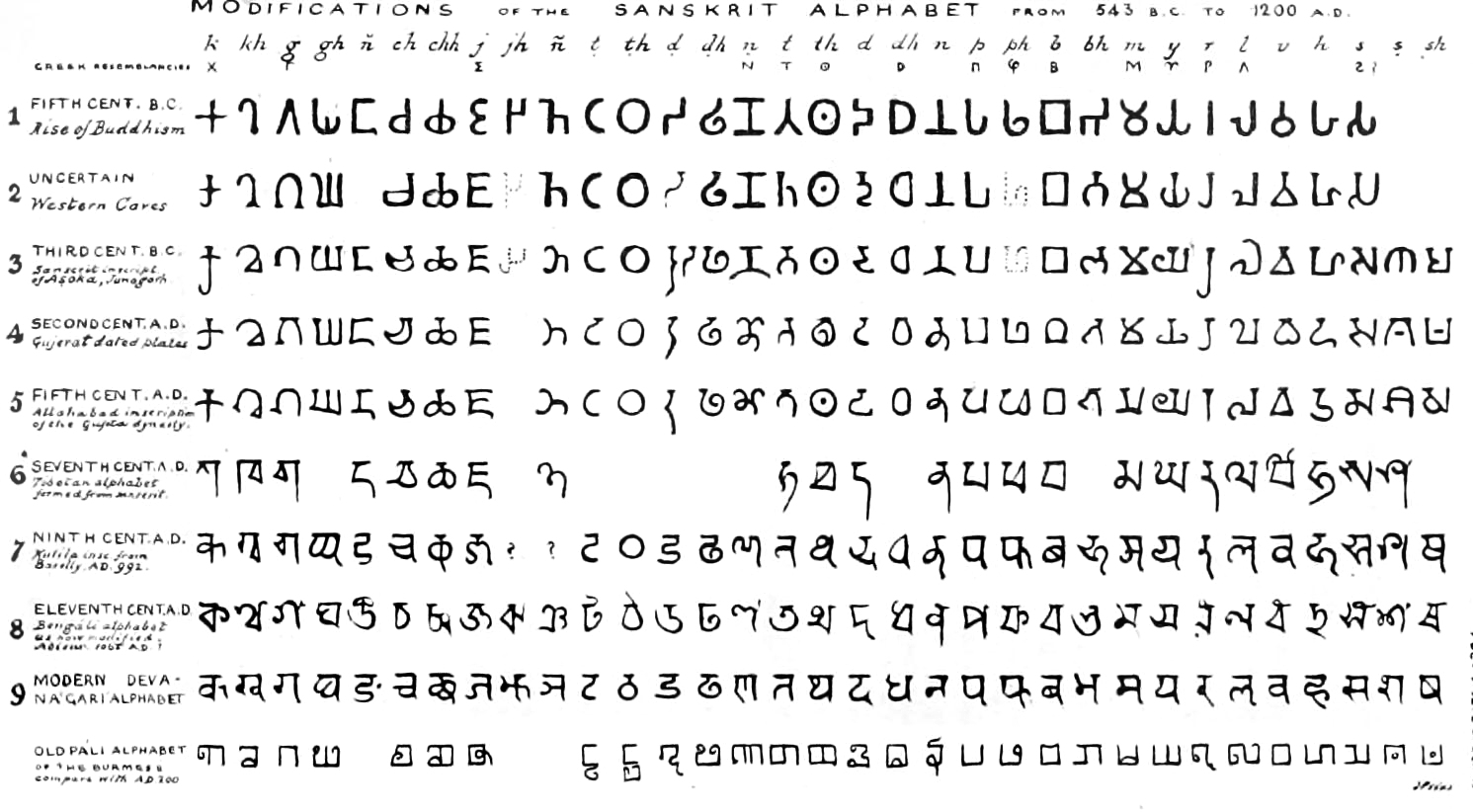
Consonants of the Brahmi script, and their evolution down to modern Devanagari, according to James Prinsep, as published in the Journal of the Asiatic Society of Bengal, in March 1838.

As a result of Prinsep's work as an editor of the Asiatic Society's journal, coins and copies of inscriptions were transmitted to him from all over India, to be deciphered, translated, and published.

The decipherment of Brahmi became the focus of European scholarly attention in the early 19th century during East India Company rule in India, in particular in the Asiatic Society of Bengal in Calcutta. Brahmi was deciphered by Prinsep, who was then the secretary of the Society, in a series of scholarly articles published in the Society's journal between 1836 and 1838. His breakthroughs built on the epigraphic work of Christian Lassen, Edwin Norris, H. H. Wilson and Alexander Cunningham, among others.

The edicts in Brahmi script mentioned a King Devanampriya Piyadasi which Prinsep initially assumed was a Sri Lankan king. He was then able to associate this title with Ashoka on the basis of Pali script from Sri Lanka communicated to him by George Turnour. These scripts were found on the pillars at Delhi and Allahabad and on rock inscriptions from both sides of India, and also the Kharosthi script in the coins and inscriptions of the north-west. The idea of Corpus Inscriptionum Indicarum, a collection of Indian epigraphy, was first suggested by Prinsep and the work was formally begun by Sir Alexander Cunningham in 1877. His studies on inscriptions helped in the establishment of date of Indian dynasties based on references to Antiochus and other Greeks. Prinsep's research and writing were not confined to India. Prinsep also delved into the early history of Afghanistan, producing several works that touched on archaeological finds in that country. Many of the collections were sent by Alexander Burnes. After James Prinsep's death, his brother Henry Thoby Prinsep published in 1844 a volume exploring the numismatist's work on collections made from Afghanistan.

=== Other pursuits ===
A talented artist and craftsman, Prinsep made meticulous sketches of ancient monuments, astronomy, instruments, fossils and other subjects. He was also very interested in understanding weather. He designed a modified barometer that automatically compensated for temperature. He maintained meteorological registers, apart from supplying barometers to volunteers and graphically summarising the records of others. He conducted experiments on practical methods to prevent rusting of iron surfaces.

== Personal life ==
Prinsep married Harriet Sophia Aubert, elder daughter of Lieutenant-Colonel Jeremiah Aubert (grandson of Alexander Aubert) of the Bengal army and his wife Hannah, at the cathedral in Calcutta on 25 April 1835. They had a daughter Eliza in 1837, who was to be the only child to survive.

He was elected a member to the American Philosophical Society in 1839.

== Death and legacy ==
Prinsep Ghat at Kolkata (Calcutta) in 1906

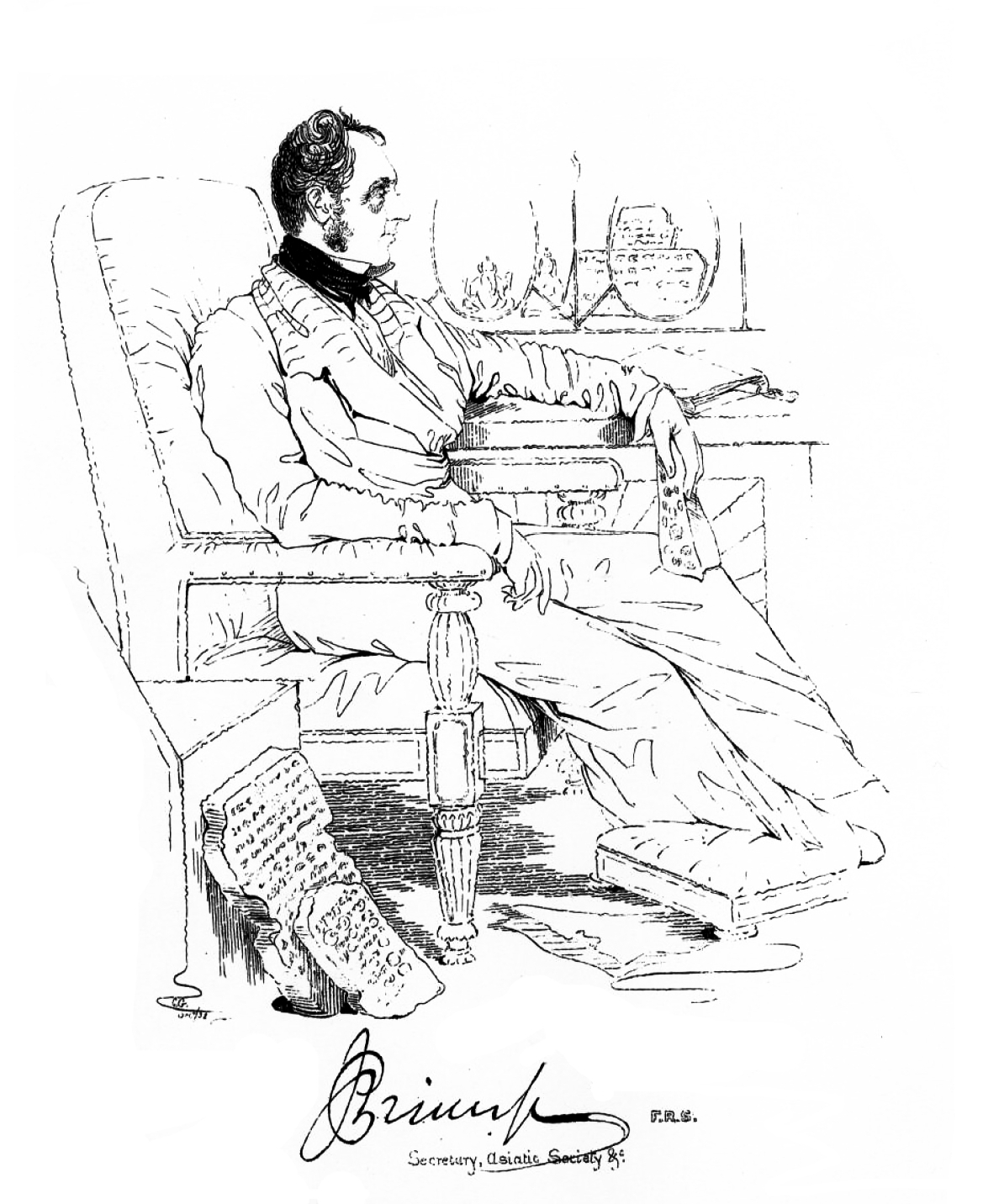
Portrait by Colesworthey Grant (c. 1838)

Prinsep literally worked himself to death. From 1838 he began to suffer from recurrent headaches and sickness. It was initially thought to be related to a liver (bilious) condition and he was forced to get away from his studies and left for England in November 1838 aboard the Herefordshire. He arrived in England in poor condition and did not recover. He died on 22 April 1840 in his sister Sophia Haldimand's home at 31 Belgrave Square of a "softening of the brain". A genus of plant Prinsepia was named after him by the botanist John Forbes Royle in 1839 in appreciation of his work.

News of his death reached India and several memorials were commissioned. A bust at the Asiatic Society was to be made by Francis Chantrey but was finished by Henry Weekes. Prinsep Ghat, a Palladian porch on the bank of the Hooghly River designed by W. Fitzgerald in 1843, was erected in his memory by the citizens of Calcutta. Part of his original collection of ancient coins and artefacts from the Indian subcontinent is now in the British Museum, London.

== See also ==
- William Jones
- Allahabad Pillar

== Sources ==
- Prinsep, J. (1837). "Interpretation of the Most Ancient of the Inscriptions on the Pillar Called the Lát of Feroz Sháh, near Delhi, and of the Allahabad Rodhia and Mattiah Pillar, or Lát, Inscriptions Which Agree Therewith". Journal of the Asiatic Society of Bengal. 6: 566–609.
- Kejariwal, O. P. (1993), The Prinseps of India: A Personal Quest. The Indian Archives, 42 (1-2)
- Allbrook, Malcolm (2008), 'Imperial Family': The Prinseps, Empire and Colonial Government in India and Australia, PhD thesis, Griffith University, Australia.
- James Prinsep and O. P. Kejariwal (2009), "Benares Illustrated" and "James Prinsep and Benares" , Pilgrims Publishing, ISBN 81-7769-400-6.
