= Der Vampyr =

1828 opera by Heinrich Marschner

- Opera by Heinrich Marschner
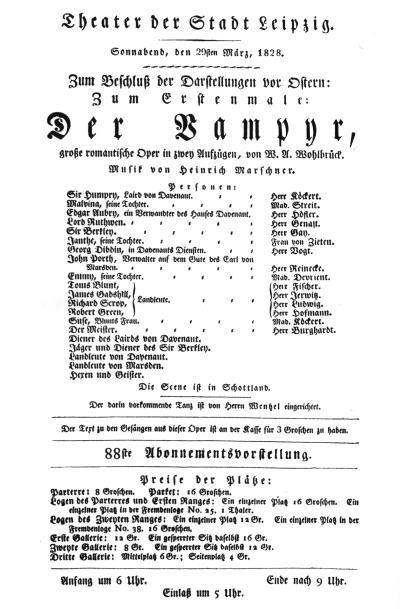
- Poster from 1828
- Translation: The Vampire
- Librettist: Wilhelm August Wohlbrück
- Language: German
- Based on: Heinrich Ludwig Ritter's Der Vampir oder die Totenbraut
- Premiere: 29 March 1828; Altes Theater (Leipzig)

Der Vampyr (The Vampire) is a Romantic opera in two acts by Heinrich Marschner. The German libretto by Wilhelm August Wohlbrück (Marschner's brother-in-law) is based on the play Der Vampir oder die Totenbraut (1821) by Heinrich Ludwig Ritter, which itself was based on the short story The Vampyre (1819) by John Polidori. The first performance took place on 29 March 1828 in Leipzig, where it was a hit.

The opera is still occasionally performed, and, in 1992, an updated adaptation, entitled The Vampyr: A Soap Opera, with new lyrics by Charles Hart, starring Omar Ebrahim and produced by Janet Street-Porter, was serialised on BBC television.

In June 2014, OperaHub in Boston premiered a new English-language adaptation of Der Vampyr by John J King that spoofs more modern vampire stories such as Twilight, Dracula, the Vampire Chronicles, and Buffy the Vampire Slayer.

== Roles ==
Role	Voice type	Premiere, 29 March 1828 (Conductor: Heinrich Marschner)
Lord Ruthven, the vampire	baritone	Franz Eduard Genast
Sir Humphrey Davenaut	bass	Köckert
Malwina, his daughter	soprano	Wilhelmina Streit
Sir Edgar Aubry	tenor	Josef August Höfler
Sir John Berkley	bass	Gay
Janthe, his daughter	soprano	von Zieten
George Dibdin, a servant in Davenaut's house	tenor	Vogt
Emmy Perth	soprano	Dorothea Devrient
Toms Blunt	baritone	Wilhelm Fischer
Suse, his wife	mezzo-soprano	Wilhelmine Köckert
James Gadshill	tenor	
Richard Scrop	tenor	
Robert Green	bass	
The Vampire Master	speaking part	
John Perth	speaking part	Reinecke

== Synopsis ==
Place: Scotland
Time: the eighteenth century.

=== Act 1 ===
Scene 1: After midnight

At a Witches' Sabbath, the Vampire Master tells Lord Ruthven that if he cannot sacrifice three virgin brides within the next 24 hours, he will die. If he can, he will be granted another year of life. The clock strikes one, and Ruthven's first victim, Janthe, arrives for a clandestine meeting, although she is due to marry another on the following day. Berkley, having discovered that she is missing, is searching for her with his men, and Ruthven hides with her in a cave. Her screams alert the search-party, and the body and the Vampire are discovered. Berkley stabs Ruthven and leaves him to die, but he is discovered by Aubry, whose life had been saved by Ruthven in the past. Ruthven pleads with Aubry to drag him into the moonlight so that he can revive, and Aubry, while doing so, realises that Ruthven is a vampire. He has to swear not to reveal this secret for twenty-four hours, or he will become a vampire, too.

Scene 2: Next morning

The 18-year-old Malwina and Aubry, with whom she is in love, are told by Davenaut that she must marry the Earl of Marsden. Aubry recognises the Earl as Lord Ruthven, but is told that he is Ruthven's brother, who has been abroad for some time. Aubry, however, recognises a wound that proves that the Earl really is Ruthven, and is about to denounce him when Ruthven reminds him of his oath and the consequences that will follow if he breaks it. The preparations for Malwina's marriage to "Marsden" begin.

=== Act 2 ===
Scene 1: Near Marsden castle

Emmy awaits her husband-to-be, George. News of Janthe's gruesome death emerges, and Emmy recounts the legend of the Vampire. Ruthven appears and impresses the villagers with his largesse. He flirts with Emmy until, interrupted by George, he departs - though by then he has extracted a promise from Emmy that she will dance with him later.

Scene 2

Aubry tries to persuade Ruthven to give up his claim to Malwina, but is again reminded of the fate that awaits if he breaks his oath. Ruthven, in a soliloquy, rails against the torments that a Vampire must face.

Scene 3

Aubry is torn by his choice between breaking his oath and saving Malwina, or keeping quiet and losing her to the Vampire. George asks Aubry to use his influence to stop "Marsden" from seducing Emmy. Aubry warns George that he must keep watch over Emmy - but already she is being led into the forest by Ruthven.

Scene 4: Outside the inn

Blunt, Gadshill, Scrop and Green sing of the pleasures of drink. Blunt's wife Suse upbraids the men, to the delight of the onlookers, but a dishevelled George arrives, recounting how he followed Emmy and "Marsden", only to find him standing over her dead body. He had shot the Earl immediately, leaving him to die in the moonlight. The villagers express their sympathy and sorrow.

Scene 5: In Davenaut's castle

Malwina is to be married to "Marsden" before midnight. Aubry warns her that she is in danger, and she puts her trust in God. The wedding-guests arrive, followed by Ruthven, who apologises for his lateness. Malwina and Aubry make one last appeal to Davenaut, who throws Aubry out and orders the wedding to proceed. A thunderstorm approaches, and Aubry returns, having decided to reveal Ruthven's secret at no matter what cost to himself. Suddenly, the clock strikes one, and Aubry, released from his oath, reveals that "Marsden" is Lord Ruthven, the Vampire. Ruthven, having failed in his task, is struck by lightning and descends into Hell. Now Davenaut asks Malwina to forgive him and consents to her marriage to Aubry, to general rejoicing.

== Instrumentation ==
Marschner scored the opera for two piccolos and two flutes (not doubling), two oboes, two clarinets, two bassoons, serpent, four horns, two clarion natural trumpets, three trombones, timpani, tamtam, and strings, together with two offstage horns and two offstage trumpets.

== Music ==
Apart from some references to Beethoven, and, in the Ruthven/Emmy/George scene, a similarity with Don Giovanni/Zerlina/Masetto, Marschner's opera is a notable link between two other operas with supernatural elements, Carl Maria von Weber's Der Freischütz (1821) and Richard Wagner's The Flying Dutchman (1843). Much of the music is reminiscent of Weber: one example is the Aubry/Malwina duet whose tune also appears in the overture, and there is a marked similarity between the Witches' Sabbath and the Wolf's Glen (Freischütz). Marschner, however, made no attempt to introduce any local colour into his score. On the other hand, Emmy's Legend of the Vampire prefigures Senta's aria about the story of the Flying Dutchman, and the identical description, "der bleiche Mann" (the pallid man), appears in both.

Wagner, in fact, conducted Der Vampyr when at Würzburg in 1833. When his brother, who sang the part of Aubry, complained that the aria "Wie ein schöner Frühlingsmorgen" was not effective enough, Wagner replaced Marschner's original agitato ending with a new allegro of his own. Despite being well received at the time, Wagner's allegro is rarely performed.

The opera is normally performed in the 1924 edition by Hans Pfitzner.

== Recordings ==
- Gisela Rathauscher, Traute Skladal, Liane Synek, Maria Nussbaumer, Kurt Equiluz, Erich Kuchar, Fritz Sperlbauer, Großes Wiener Rundfunkorchester (Viennese Radio Orchestra), conductor Kurt Tenner. Recording from Vienna, 1951. Line Music/Cantus Classics CACD 5.00269 F (supposedly not the revised version by Pfitzner)
- Ursula Boecke, Albert Kunz, Bruno Manazza, Charles Gillig, Chloe Owen, Erich Arberle, Ernst Gutstein, Gottfried Fehr, Hans Eberg, Nelde Clavel, Bern Radio Orchestra, conductor Hans Haug. Recording from 1963 edited in 1971 on a 4-LP box set together with Hans Heiling, no label, ref. MRF-70-S.
- Roland Hermann, Arleen Auger, Anna Tomowa-Sintow, Donald Grobe, Kurt Böhme, Jane Marsch, Nikolaus Hillebrand, Bavarian Radio Symphony Orchestra, conductor Fritz Rieger. Live recording from Munich, 1974. OPD-Opera d'Oro 1186 (Original version)
- Siegmund Nimsgern (Ruthven), Carole Farley (Malvina Davenaut), Anastasia Tomaszewska-Schepis, Josef Protschka (Aubry), Armando Caforio, Galina Pisarenko, Martin Engel, Chorus and Orchestra Sinfonica of Radio Italiana, conductor Günter Neuhold. Live recording from Rome, 1980. HOMMAGE 7001834-HOM (revised version by Pfitzner)
- Franz Hawlata (Ruthwen), Jonas Kaufmann (Aubry), Regina Klepper, Thomas Dewald, Yoo-Chang Nah, Anke Hoffmann, Hein Heidbüchel, Kay Immer, Franz Gerihsen, Josef Otten, Marietta Schwittay-Niedzwicki, Dirk Schortemeier, WDR Rundfunkchor Köln and WDR Rundfunkorchester Köln, conductor Helmuth Froschauer. Recording from Cologne, 1999. Capriccio C5184, UPC 845221051840

== Operas with similar themes ==
- Other early 19th-century vampire operas were Silvestro de Palma's I vampiri (1812), Martin-Joseph Mengal's Le vampire (1826) and Lindpaintner's Der Vampyr (1828).
