= Heinrich Marschner =

German composer (1795–1861)

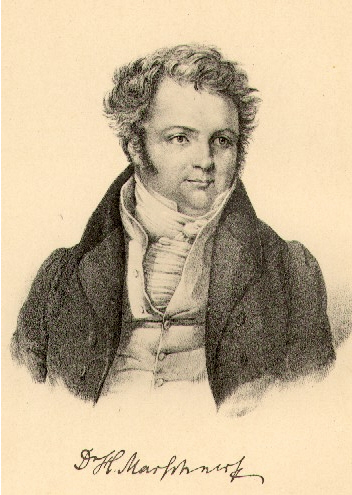
Heinrich Marschner, lithograph after a drawing by F. A. Jung, c. 1830

Heinrich August Marschner (16 August 1795 – 14 December 1861) was a German composer best known for his operas. He is considered to be the most important composer of German opera between Weber and Wagner.

== Biography ==
Marschner was born in Zittau, in southeastern Saxony, and was originally intended for a legal career. After a meeting with Beethoven around 1815–16, he decided to devote himself to music and became a private music teacher in Bratislava. From 1821 he worked as a stage composer and conductor at the municipal theatres in Dresden (from 1821), Leipzig (from 1827), and the Court Theatre at Hanover (from 1830), where the opera Hans Heiling (1833) established his name among the leading German opera composers of the time. He died in Hanover.

== Legacy ==
Marschner was widely regarded as one of the most important composers in Europe from about 1830 until the end of the 19th century. He was a rival of Weber and friend of Beethoven and Mendelssohn. His operas often contain thematic material based on folksong, and this folk-influenced genre had begun with Weber's Der Freischütz (1821). The last of his operas, Austin, was first staged in 1852. It was not very well received, and later the increasingly renowned Wagner overshadowed him.

Robert Schumann praised Marschner's piano trios lavishly. Marschner did not just toss off these works as an afterthought, but clearly devoted considerable time and effort to writing them. He gave the title "Grand Trio" to each of his works for piano, violin and cello, indicative of the importance he attached to them. In these pieces, one finds all of the emotions prevalent in the Romantic movement during the mid-19th century.

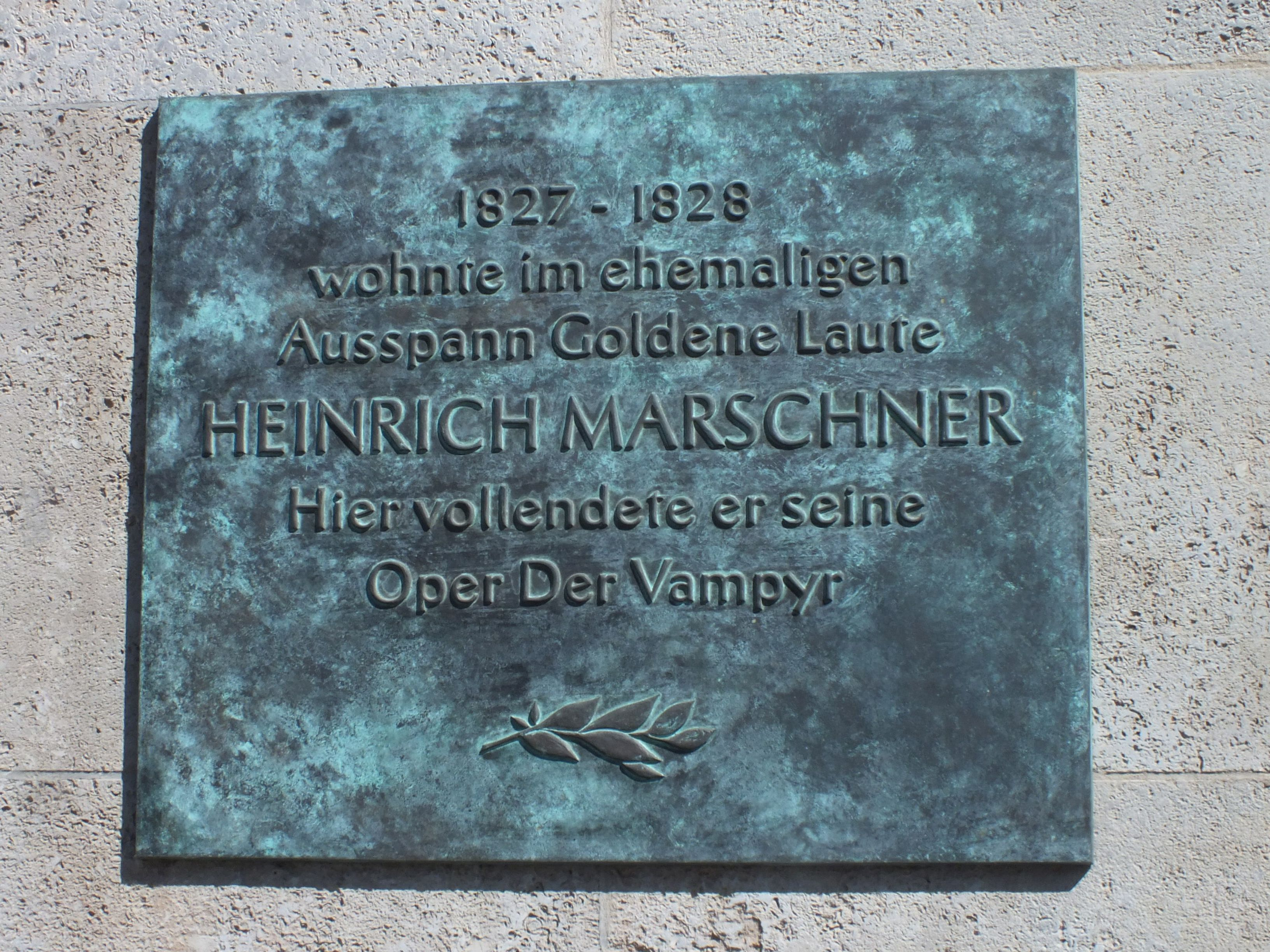
Comemmorative plaque on the house 8, Ranstädter Steinweg in Leipzig, where Marschner finished the opera Der Vampyr

To the extent that Marschner is still remembered, it is largely for his operas Hans Heiling (1833), Der Vampyr (1828) and Der Templer und die Jüdin (1829), extremely popular in his lifetime. Marschner's ability to depict supernatural horror by musical means is especially evident in the first two operas as well as in some of his ballads, such as "Die Monduhr" (c. 1839).

Next to his operas, Marschner's most significant musical contribution is to the Lied. The best of his works in this form are comparable with those by Carl Loewe. He also wrote a considerable amount of chamber music, including seven piano trios, as well as unaccompanied male choruses that were very popular in the nineteenth century. While Marschner's operas strongly influenced Wagner, his chamber music, songs, and his cantata Klänge aus Osten (1842) were admired by Schumann, whose cantata Paradise and the Peri (1843) shows the older composer's influence. Marschner's Bagatelles for guitar (1814) have been taken up lately by some guitarists, and some of his chamber music is still very occasionally played. Among his operas, Hans Heiling and especially Der Vampyr have been adapted and revived in recent years with considerable success.

== Selected works ==
=== Incidental music (Music to plays) ===
- Prinz Friedrich von Homburg, Op. 56 (1821) to the play by Kleist
- Schön Ella, Op. 27 (1822–3) to a play by Johann Friedrich Kind
- Der Goldschmied von Ulm (1856) to a play by Salomon Hermann Mosenthal
- Die Hermannsschlacht to the play by Kleist

=== Chamber music ===
- Piano trio No. 1 in A minor, Op. 29
- Piano trio No. 2 in G minor, Op. 111
- Piano trio No. 3 in F minor, Op. 121
- Piano trio No. 4 in D major, Op. 135
- Piano trio No. 5 in D minor, Op. 138
- Piano trio No. 6 in C minor, Op. 148
- Piano trio No. 7 in F major, Op. 167
- Piano quartet No. 1 in B-flat major, Op. 36
- Piano quartet No. 2 in G major, Op. 158

=== Solo music ===
- Douze Bagatelles pour la Guitarre, Op. 4
