= Blumauer =

Blumauer is a surname. Notable people with this surname include:

- Aloys Blumauer (1755–1798), Austrian poet
- Elke Blumauer (born 1963), German handball player
- Georg Blumauer (born 1974), Austrian former professional tennis player
- Karl Blumauer (1785–1841), Austrian theatre actor, singer and writer
- Minona Frieb-Blumauer (1816–1886), German actress and singer
