= Giovanni Battista Lalli =

Italian poet and jurist

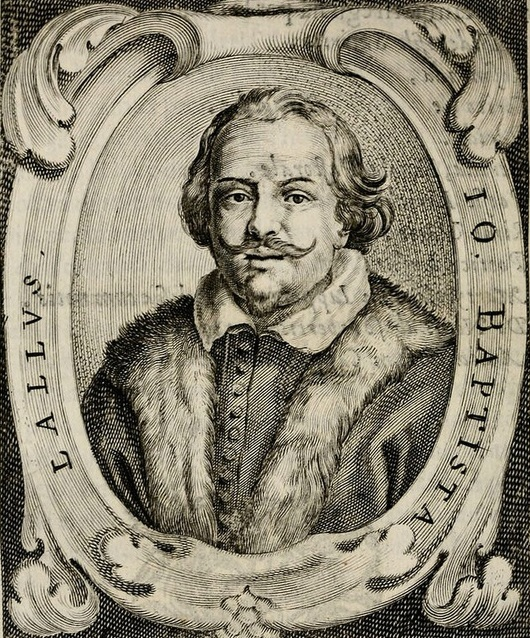
- Portrait of Giovanni Battista Lalli. From the book "Le glorie degli Incogniti", 1647
- Born: 1 July 1572; Norcia, Papal States
- Died: 6 February 1637 (aged 64); Norcia, Papal States
- Education: University of Parma; University of Perugia
- Occupations: Poet; Jurist; Civil servant
- Writing career
- Language: Latin; Italian
- Period: 17th century; Baroque literature
- Genres: Poetry
- Movements: Baroque; Marinism

Giovan Battista Lalli (1 July 1572 – 6 February 1637) was an Italian poet and jurist. He was the author of numerous mock-heroic poems among which La franceide and L'Eneide travestita are probably the best known.

== Biography ==
Lalli was born in Norcia, Umbria, in 1572. He studied law in Parma and Perugia, where he obtained his doctoral degree in 1598. He served as governor of several little cities both in the Papal States and in the Duchy of Parma. His mock-heroic poems, La moscheide ouero Domiziano il moschicida (1624), recounting the Emperor Domitian's war against the assembled armies of flies, and La franceide ouero del mal francese (1629) adapted Marinist conceptismo to the comic repertory. His L'Eneide travestita (The Aeneid Disguised, 1633), a mock heroic travesty of the Aeneid of Virgil making fun of the feudal cult of heroes, was imitated in the Virgile travesti by Paul Scarron, which in turn inspired a whole series of adaptations both in Germanic and Slavic languages, from Charles Cotton's Scarronides to the Eneida by Ivan Kotliarevsky. Lalli attempted serious imitation of Torquato Tasso's Jerusalem Delivered and Giambattista Marino's Gerusalemme distrutta in his epic Tito Vespasiano ouero Gerusalemme desolata, a poem upon the siege of Jerusalem (1635). The Argomenti, or themes, that precede each canto of the poem were conceived by Bartolomeo Tortoletti. Later in his life Lalli retired to his native Norcia, where he died on February 6, 1637, at the age of 64. Lalli was a member of the Accademia degli Incogniti of Venice.

== Works ==
- Moscheide ouero Domiziano il moschicida. Venice: appresso Giacomo Sarzina. 1624.
- Franceide overo del mal francese. Venice: presso Giacomo Sarzina. 1629.
- Tito Vespasiano overo Gierusalemme disolata. Venice: presso Giacomo Sarzina. 1629.
- Opere poetiche del dottor Gio. Battista Lalli da Norsia. Cioè: La franceide, La moschedie, Gerusalemme desolata, Rime giocose... Milan: appresso Donato Fontana, & Gioseffo Scaccabarozzo. 1630.

== Bibliography ==
- Media related to Giovanni Battista Lalli at Wikimedia Commons
- «Gio. Battista Lalli da Norsia». In : Le glorie de gli Incogniti: o vero, Gli huomini illustri dell'Accademia de' signori Incogniti di Venetia, In Venetia : appresso Francesco Valuasense stampator dell'Accademia, 1647, pp. 220–223 (on-line).
- Giovanni Battista Lalli entry (in Italian) by Giulio Natali in the Enciclopedia Treccani, 1933
- Picchio, Riccardo (1995). "From Lalli to Kotljarevs'kyj. On the Evolution of a Poetic Formula". Slavia. 64 (1–2): 133–141.
- Russo, Emilio (2004). "LALLI, Giovanni Battista". Dizionario Biografico degli Italiani (in Italian). Vol. 63: Labroca–Laterza. Rome: Istituto dell'Enciclopedia Italiana. ISBN 978-88-12-00032-6.
- Braund, Susanna (1 June 2019). "Travesty: The Ultimate Domestication of Epic". classicsforall.org.uk.
