= Eneida =

1798 poem by Ivan Kotliarevsky

Aeneid
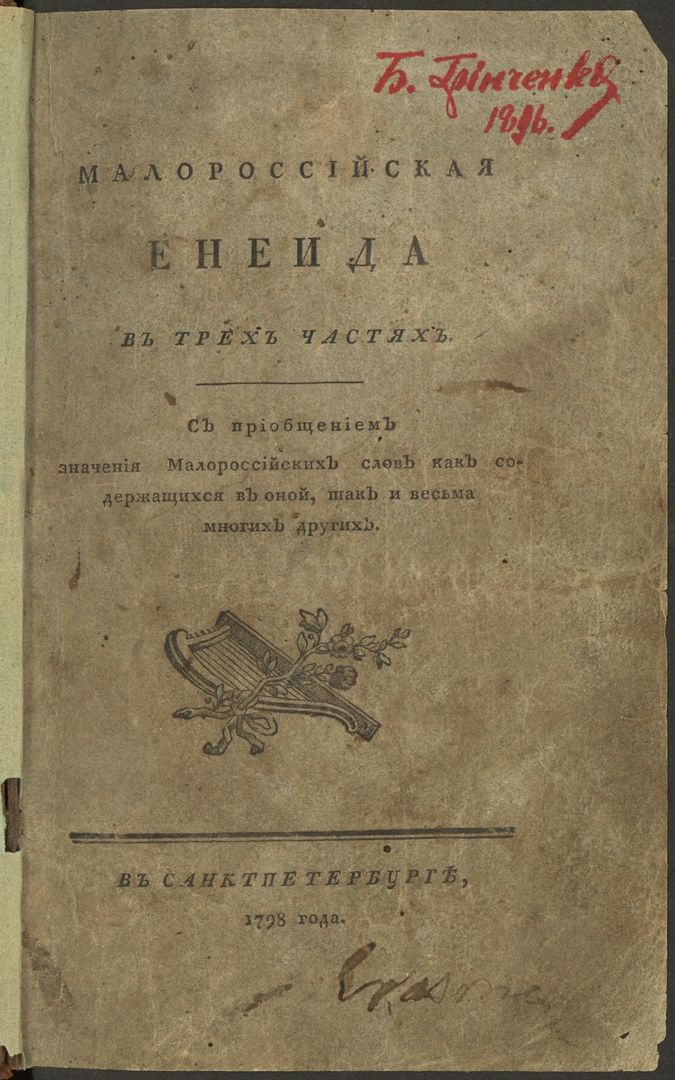
- The first edition of Kotliarevsky's Eneyida, 1798
- Author: Ivan Kotliarevsky
- Original title: Енеїда
- Translator: Bohdan Melnyk
- Language: Ukrainian
- Genre: Travesty, poem
- Publisher: Maksym Parpura (in Ukrainian, first ed.); The Basilian Press (in English, full ed.)
- Publication date: 1798 (first 3 parts); 1842 (in full)
- Publication place: Russian Empire; Canada
- English publication date: 1933 (first stances); 2004 (in full)
- Pages: 279
- ISBN: 978-0921-5-3766-3
- Followed by: Natalka Poltavka (1819) «Москаль-чарівник» (1819, Moskal-Charivnyk)

Eneida (Ukrainian: Енеїда, lit. 'Aeneid', Ukrainian pronunciation: [ɛnɛˈjidɐ]) is a burlesque poem in the Ukrainian language, written by Ivan Kotliarevsky in 1798. This mock-heroic poem is considered to be the first literary work published wholly in the Ukrainian vernacular. The talented depiction of various elements of the life of the Ukrainian people in the context of language, history, traditions and everyday life brought the poem great success among contemporaries, caused many imitations, and led to the final displacement of the old literary language from the literary use by the vernacular.

Eneida is a parody of Virgil's Aeneid, where Kotliarevsky transformed the Trojan heroes into Zaporozhian Cossacks. It is a loose retelling of N. P. Osipov's 1791 Aeneid Turned Inside Out (Russian: Виргилиева Энеида, вывороченная наизнанку), written in Russian; the latter being a free translation of Aloys Blumauer's Virgils Aeneis, travestiert (1784), which in turn hails back to Paul Scarron's 1648 poem Le Virgile travesty en vers burlesques. Critics believe that it was written in the light of the destruction of Zaporozhian Host by the order of Catherine the Great. The poem was written during the formation of romanticism and nationalism in Europe. At that time, part of the Ukrainian elite was gripped by nostalgia for the Cossack time.

The first three parts of the poem were published in 1798 in St. Petersburg, without the author's knowledge. The complete Eneida was published after Kotliarevsky's death in 1842.

The poem is in top-100 list by "From Skovoroda to modern time: 100 most important works in Ukrainian".

== Synopsis ==
=== І ===
After the destruction of Troy by the Greeks, Aeneas (Enei) fled with a troop of Trojans by sea. Juno, who did not love Aeneas, the son of Venus, ran to the wind god Aeolus to raise a storm and drown the Trojans. Aeolus let loose the winds and made a terrible storm. But Aeneas gave a bribe to the god of the sea, Neptune, and the storm subsided. Venus, worried about her son, went to complain about Juno to Zeus.

He said that the fate of Aeneas had already been decided — he would go to Rome to "build a strong kingdom", "drive the whole world into serfdom" and "they will all be leaders". After long wanderings, the Trojans reached Carthage, where Dido ruled. The queen fell in love with Aeneas and walked with him so that he forgot about his main goal — the construction of Rome. Zeus, accidentally looking at the earth from Olympus, saw this, got angry and sent Mercury to remind Aeneas of his appointment. Aeneas and the Trojans fled Carthage at night, and Dido burned herself with grief.

=== ІІ ===
The Trojans sailed the sea and landed in Sicily, where King Acest ruled. The Sicilians received them hospitably. Aeneas decided to hold a wake for his father Anchises. During the Trojan feast and games, Juno sent her maid to earth, who persuaded the Trojan women to burn the boats. There was a big fire. Aeneas became angry and went to curse the gods, asking for rain. The rain went down and some of the ships survived. Aeneas went to bed in grief and saw his father in a dream. Anchises promised that all would be well and asked him to visit him in hell.

=== III ===
Leaving Sicily, the Trojans sailed on the sea for a long time, until they landed at Cumae. Aeneas went looking for a way to hell and met Sibyl the soothsayer. She promised to take Aeneas to hell in exchange for a bribe to the sun god Phoebus and a gift for herself. They both went down the street to hell, where Drowsiness, Yawning, and Death lived, and behind them stood the plague, war, cold, famine, and other calamities. Across the Styx, the mythical ferryman Charon transported Aeneas and Sibyl to hell. At the entrance they were met by a terrible Cerberus, to whom the soothsayer threw bread. There they saw sinners tormented in hell: lords, liars, stingy, stupid parents… Aeneas met in hell Dido and the slain fellow Trojans. Finally he met his father Anchises, who said that Aeneas will found "a great and zealous family", that "will rule the whole world".

=== IV ===
After boarding the boats, the Trojans, led by Aeneas, sail on. The guide sailor sees an island ruled by the cruel queen Circe, who turns people into animals. The island could not be bypassed. Aeneas turns to Aeolus and asks to avert trouble. Aeolus helps and the army continues its journey.

Aeneas and his Trojans sail to the island ruled by the Latin king. Together with his wife Amata, he is going to marry his daughter Lavinia to King Turn. Meanwhile, Aeneas sends soldiers on reconnaissance. They tell him that the locals speak Latin. Aeneas and his army learn Latin in a week. Then Aeneas sends the king inns and he receives the Cossacks with honors, wishing that Aeneas became his son-in-law. Meanwhile, Juno, seeing that Aeneas is already allowing himself too much, decides to give him a good lesson for his impudent behavior.

The goddess sends Erinys Telphousia, who inhabits first Amata and then visit Turnus. Turnus sees a dream in which his future bride chooses Aeneas as her fiancé. Offended, he sends a letter to the Latin king, declaring war. Aeneas' army accidentally drops greyhounds on Amata's nanny's dog. In turn, she begins to turn people against Aeneas. The Latin people are preparing for war.

=== V ===
Aeneas is thinking about how to defeat Turnus, because the Olympic gods were in no hurry to help. Aeneas fell asleep, and in a dream an old man advises Aeneas to make friends with the Arcadians, who were enemies of the Latins. Thus he decides to seek help from the Arcadians (Evander is the king of the Arcadians, Pallant is his son).

Aeneas sacrifices to the gods and goes to Evander. He agrees to help and sends his son Pallant with the army. Venus asks Vulcan the blacksmith to make her son Aeneas a strong weapon.

Juno sends a maid to warn Turnus about a possible attack by Aeneas and advises to strike first. He besieges the Trojan fortress, but can not take it. Then he burns the Trojan fleet. Venus complains to Cybella (mother of the gods), and she, in turn, complains to Zeus. The supreme god turns the ships of the Trojans into sirens, and the Rutuls flee in fear. Then there was silence again. Nyz and Evrial, young warriors, are on guard. Nyz offers to get into the Rutul camp and beat the enemies. He wants to do it himself, because Evrial has an old mother, and he has no one. However, his comrade does not agree, and they go together. Nyz and Evrial showed great courage, cut out many enemies, and when they returned, they came across Latins going to their camp. The young men try to hide in the woods, but the Latins tracked them down, surrounded the forest, from which "you can not slip away", and began to look for a "brave couple". When Evrial was caught, Nyz climbed a willow tree, dropped his spear, and thus revealed himself. Colonel Wolsent executed Evrial, and Nyz thrust his sword into the enemy and fell in battle.

A fierce battle begins. Turnus goes with the army to the assault fortress, and the Trojans bravely defend themselves; Juno intervenes again and defends Turnus. The Rutuls are beating the Trojans and they already want to leave the fortress. Then the artillery chief begins to embarrass them, to remind them that Aeneas "considers us soldiers, the grandchildren of the most glorious grandfathers". The embarrassed Trojans rallied and went on the offensive, and Turnus fled.

=== VI ===
Angered at the gods for their intervention, Zeus forbids the gods to do anything for either party. Venus comes to the supreme god, begins to flatter him and complain about Juno. Juno, hearing this, starts a quarrel.

At this time, Aeneas sails on a ship with Pallant to help the Trojans. When everyone is asleep, he thinks about how to defeat Turnus. Suddenly he sees a mavka in the water. She tells him that Turnus and his soldiers have already started fighting the Trojans and nearly burned their fleet. Aeneas rushes to the rescue and immediately rushes into battle. Turnus kills the brave Pallant. Jul tells Aeneas what had happened in his absence.

Zeus, drunk, goes to apologize to his wife Juno. She deceived God with her cunning and put him to sleep. Juno turned into the image of Aeneas and lured Turnus to the ship so that he would sail home and not die.

The next day, Aeneas buried the dead. Envoys from Latin came to him. He tells them that he is not fighting against the Latins, but against Turnus, and offers to arrange a one-on-one duel with him. The ambassadors liked it and they retold the words of Aeneas to Latin and Turnus. The latter reluctantly prepares for a duel. Amata opposes the marriage of her daughter and Turnus, because she is secretly in love with him.

The next day, both sides took up positions to watch the battle. Juno sends Juturna to help Turnus. She starts a fight between the Trojans and the Rutuls again. Aeneas was wounded during the skirmish. Venus collects for him all sorts of potions that help heal the wound.

Thinking that Turn is dead, Amata decides to hang himself. This news frightened everyone. Aeneas goes to a duel with Turn, knocks him out of the sword. Juno, with the hand of Juturna, gives Turnus another sword. For this, Zeus quarrels with Juno and says: "We have already told all the gods: Aeneas will be with us in Olympus to eat the same pies that I tell you to bake." The duel continues. Having knocked Turnus to the ground, Aeneas is going to kill him, but Rutul's words touched his heart. Suddenly he notices Pallant's armor on Turnus' body and kills him.

== Analysis ==
According to Ukrainian philosopher Myroslav Popovych, Eneida belongs to the carnival and satirical literary tradition, playing on the contrast between the epic-heroic tone of Virgil's original poem and the "lowly" style of Kotliarevsky's text. The humorous effect is amplified by separate passages, which are written in a macaronic mix of vernacular Ukrainian and Classical Latin. The poem also contains references to numerous elements of Ukrainian folk tradition and represents an important source on material culture, cuisine and other aspects of daily life in Ukraine during the 18th century.

== English translation ==
Partial translations of Eneida date back to 1933 when a translation of first few stanzas of Kotliarevsky's Eneida by Wolodymyr Semenyna was published in the American newspaper of Ukrainian diaspora Ukrainian Weekly on October 20, 1933. Another partial translation was published by University of Toronto Press in 1963 in the anthology Ukrainian Poets 1189–1962, by C. H. Andrusyshen and Watson Kirkconnell. However, the first full English translation of Kotliarevsky's magnum opus Eneida was published only in 2004 in Canada by a Ukrainian-Canadian Bohdan Melnyk, most well known for his English translation of Ivan Franko's Ukrainian fairy tale "Mykyta the Fox" (Ukrainian: Лис Микита).

Еней був парубок моторний
І хлопець хоть куди козак,
На лихо здався він проворний,
Завзятіший од всіх бурлак.

Но греки, як спаливши Трою,
Зробили з неї скирту гною,
Він, взявши торбу, тягу дав;
Забравши деяких троянців,
Осмалених, як гиря, ланців,
П'ятами з Трої накивав.

Він, швидко поробивши човни,
На синє море поспускав,
Троянців насадивши повні,
І куди очі почухрав.

Но зла Юнона, суча дочка,
Розкудкудакалась, як квочка, —
Енея не любила — страх;
Давно уже вона хотіла,
Його щоб душка полетіла
У пекло, щоб і дух не пах.

— Ivan Kotliarevsky – Eneida
Translation:

Aeneas was a lively fellow
And quite a Cossack for a lad,
For mischief he was more than mellow
While courage above all he had.

But when the Greeks felt very bitter
And made of Troy a heap of litter
He took a bag, and with a lust –
With some good Troyans whom he gathered
Whose hides were tough and necks well lethered –
He showed old Troy a cloud of dust.

He quickly built some boats of timber,
Then launched them in the quiet sea
And filling them with muscle limber
He hit the foam where eyes could see.

But cackling Juno, dog-gone-daughter,
Kept cackling like a hen for water;
– That's how Aeneas lacked her grace –
A long long time she had been praying:
She wished his soul would stop delaying
The trip to that unearthly place.

— Translation by W. Semenyna

=== List of English translations ===
- Ivan Kotliarevsky. Aeneid: [Translated into English from Ukrainian by Bohdan Melnyk]. — Canada, Toronto: The Basilian Press, 2004. — 278 pages. ISBN 978-0921-5-3766-3.

== Cultural influences ==
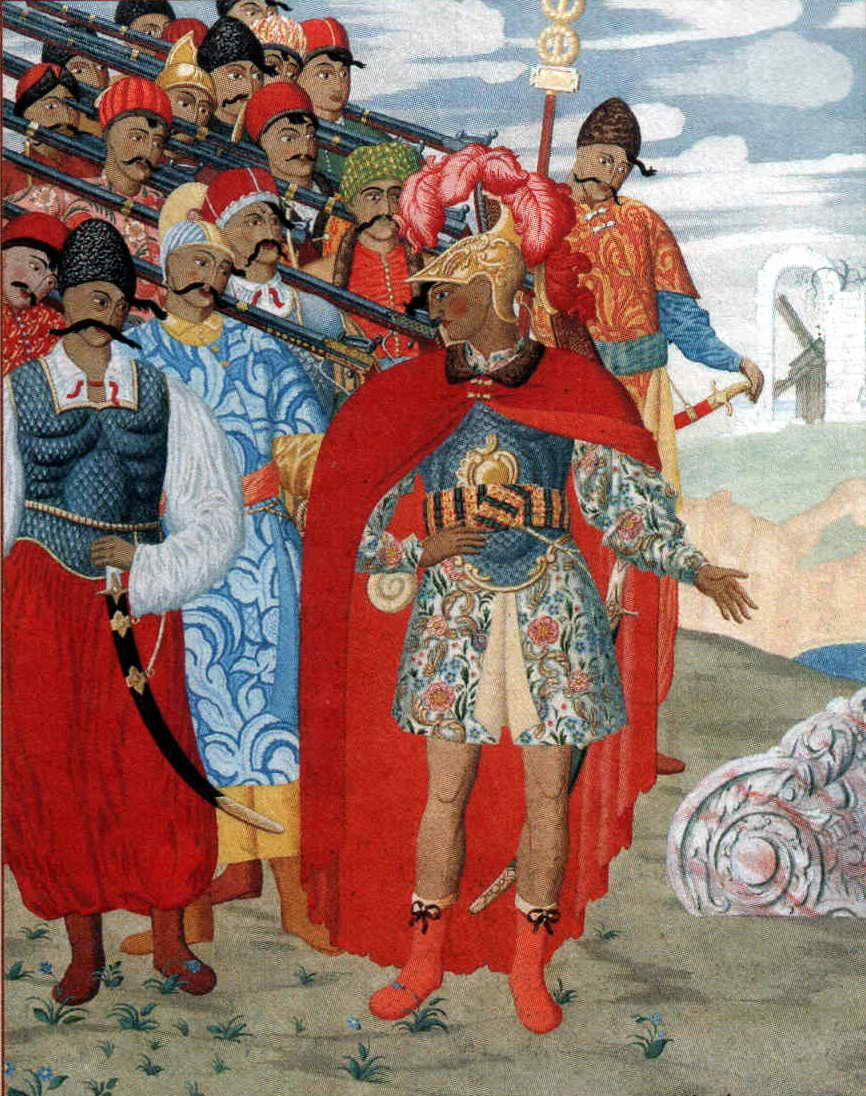
An illustration to Eneida by Heorhiy Narbut

=== In art ===
The first artist to illustrate the poem was Porfyriy Martynovych, a folklorist and ethnographer stemming from Kotliarevsky's native city of Poltava. Created during the 1870s, Martynovych's illustrations were first presented in 1903, during the opening of a monument to the poet in his native city. Among other notable artists who created illustrations to Eneida were Mykhailo Derehus, Ivan Padalka and Anatoliy Bazylevych, with the latter's works achieving the greatest popularity. In 1919 heroes of the poem were depicted by Heorhiy Narbut.

A high relief depicting the heroes of Eneida was created by sculptor Leonid Pozen as part of the monument to Ivan Kotliarevsky in Poltava in 1903. During the 1960s two cycles of decorative porcelain compositions inspired by the poem were created by Ukrainian artists Vladyslav Shcherbyna and Valentyna Trehubova.

A comic book based on the plot of Eneida was presented by Ivan Budz in 1995.

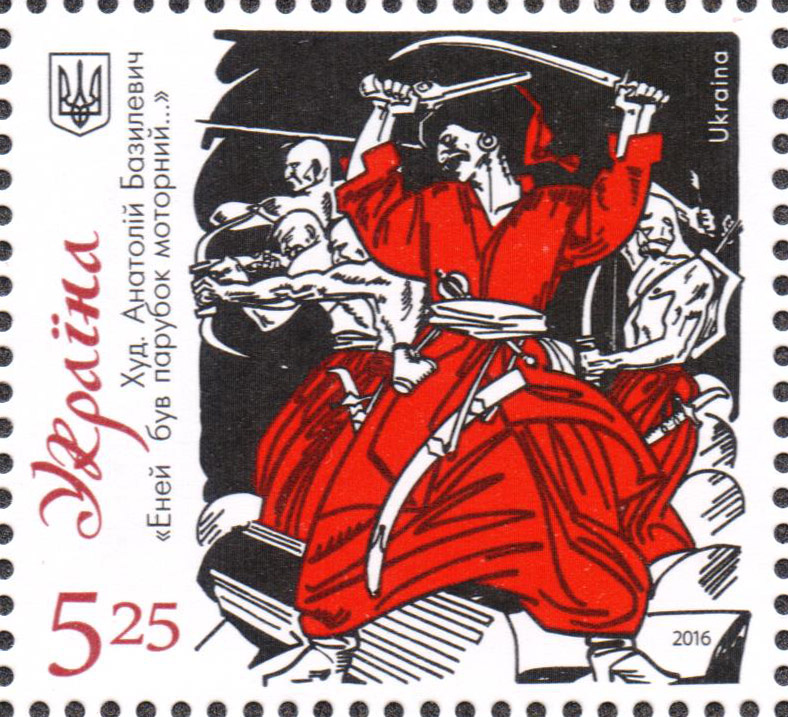
A postal stamp of Ukraine with an illustration to Eneida by Anatoliy Bazylevych

=== In other spheres ===
Literary cafe Eney, which functioned between 1966 and 2000 at the headquarters of the National Writers' Union of Ukraine in Kyiv, was named after the poem's main hero, and its interiors were decorated with illustrations to the work created by Anatoliy Bazylevych.

== Adaptations ==
=== Theatre ===
In 1891 an eponymous operetta based on Eneida was created by Mykola Sadovsky. In 1910 an opera in three acts based on Kotliarevsky's poem was presented by Mykola Lysenko, with the Ukrainian-language libretto written by Liudmyla Starytska-Cherniakhivska. A 1959 production of Lysenko's work at the Kyiv Opera starred Dmytro Hnatiuk as the main protagonist. An avant-garde treatment of Eneida was prepared in 1927 by Boris Erdman, but there is no data if it was ever realized. In 1986 a new production of Eneida premiered at the Ivan Franko National Academic Drama Theater with libretto by Ivan Drach, starring among others Natalia Sumska and Bohdan Stupka. Kotliarevskyi's work has also been adopted as rock opera and is present in the repertoire of Kyiv Puppet Theatre.

=== Film ===
- Adventures of Cossack Eney (Ukrainian: Пригоди козака Енея), a 1969 Soviet Ukrainian animation film created by Eduard Kirych.
- Eneida, a 1991 Ukrainian animation film directed by Volodymyr Dakhno; first animated feature film to premiere in independent Ukraine.

=== Other genres ===
A multimedia performance based on Eneida premiered in 2017 at the Arsenal Book Festival, with author's narration by Yurii Andrukhovych.
