= John Bulteel =

John Bulteel may refer to:

- John Bulteel (died 1669), Member of Parliament (MP) for Lostwithiel
- John Bulteel (writer) (1627–1692), his cousin, English writer and translator
- John Crocker Bulteel (1793–1843), MP for South Devon

== See also ==
- Bulteel, a surname
