= The Resurrection of Christ (poem) =

18th-century Belarusian burlesque poem

- by Anonymous
- Original title: Уваскрэсенне Хрыстова
- Country: Russian Empire (territory of Belarus)
- Language: Old Belarusian / Belarusian dialect
- Genre(s): Travesty, burlesque

The Resurrection of Christ (Belarusian: «Уваскрэсенне Хрыстова»; also known as The Resurrection of Christ and His Descent into Hell, Belarusian: Васкрэсенне Хрыстова і сашэствіе яго ў ад) is an anonymous poetic work of Belarusian literature from the late 18th century. Written in the style of a travesty, it originated under the direct influence of the Ukrainian work Verses for Easter and passed into folklore in various redactions.

== History and publication ==
One of the variants of the poem was published in the collection Belarusian Songs (1873) by Ivan Nasovich. Another version was found in the manuscript collection Belarusian Folk Legends, Epics, and Songs of the Peasants of the Former Sebezh County of the Vitebsk Governorate, 1882–1890.

== Content and style ==
Although written on a religious-ecclesiastical theme, the poem illuminates phenomena in a humorous, burlesque form, reflecting the peculiarities of the life and everyday existence of the Belarusian peasantry in the 18th century. The author describes the biblical plot of the Second Coming of Jesus and the advent of Judgment Day and the Kingdom of God in a humorous tone.

Biblical characters such as Adam, Eve, Samson, the scribe Moses, the sage Solomon, and others are presented in contemporary circumstances; in their language, behavior, and character traits, they resemble ordinary peasants more than biblical figures. The personality of the author, his view of life, and the structure of the world are clearly traceable in the work. The ideological content of The Resurrection of Christ and the author's concept of worldview give the work an anti-religious character.

== See also ==
- Eneida navyvarat
- Taras on Parnassus

== Bibliography ==
- Пашкоў, Г. П.; et al., eds. (2003). «Уваскрэсенне Хрыстова» ["The Resurrection of Christ"]. Беларуская энцыклапедыя: У 18 т. Т. 16: Трыпалі — Хвіліна [Belarusian Encyclopedia: In 18 Vol. Vol. 16: Trypali — Khvilina] (in Belarusian). Мінск: БелЭн. p. 576. ISBN 985-11-0263-6.
- Ахрыменка, П. П.; Ларчанка, М. Р. (1968). Старажытная беларуская літаратура [Ancient Belarusian Literature] (in Belarusian). Мінск.
- Лазарук, М. А. (1968). Станаўленне беларускай паэмы [The Formation of the Belarusian Poem] (in Belarusian). Мінск.
- Беларуская літаратура XIX ст.: Хрэстаматыя [Belarusian Literature of the 19th Century: Anthology] (in Belarusian). Мінск. 1971.
