= Laura Friedmann =

German soprano

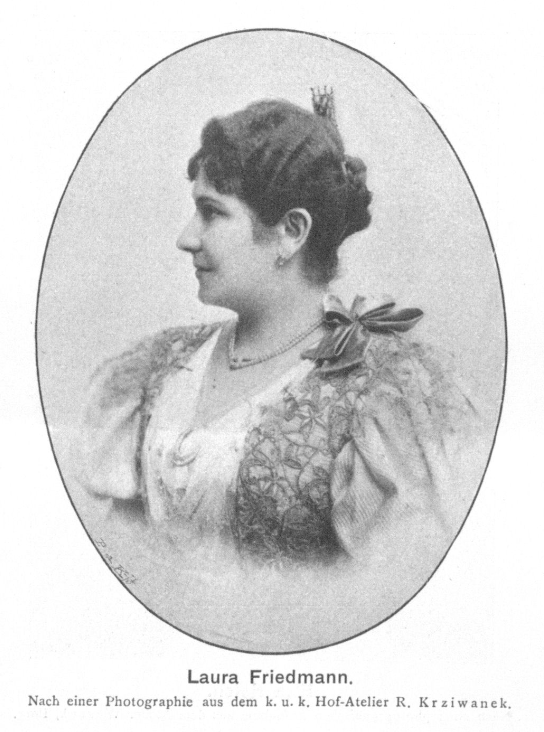
Laura Friedmann, 1900

Laura Friedmann (8 April 1862 – after 1893) was a German operatic coloratura soprano.

== Life ==
Laura Friedmann was born in Berlin on 8 April 1862. She showed her singing talent at an early age and was trained as an opera singer at the Königliche Hochschule in Berlin from 1874 to 1877. Among others, she was trained in singing by Gustav Engel and Adolf Schulze and in acting by Minona Frieb-Blumauer and Karl Gustav Berndal.

On 30 June 1877, Friedmann passed her exams under the supervision of Joseph Joachim and was discharged into professional life. She had her first engagement in Bremen under the direction of Max Pohl. She made her debut as Queen in Les Huguenots. Friedmann remained in Bremen for two years before moving to Cologne from 1880 to 1882.

To further her education, Friedmann went to Paris for a year to Pauline Viardot. In Paris, she also met Charles Gounod, Giuseppe Verdi, Ambroise Thomas and Jules Massenet personally.

From 1883 until 1893, Friedmann was a member of the Semperoper in Dresden and also appeared several times as a concert singer.

Friedmann not only sang parts for coloratura soprano, but also dramatic parts. Her repertoire included among others Susanna in The Marriage of Figaro, Donna Anna in Don Giovanni, Rosina in the Barber of Seville, Violetta in Verdi's La traviata, Gilda in Rigoletto and Martha in Friedrich von Flotow's Martha.
