= Travesty (literature) =

Travesty is a comical or satirical literary genre, commonly a poetry, in which the plot of a well-known myth or a serious literary work is retold in a comical form. The genre overlaps with parody, but differs from the latter in that a travesty follows the plot of the original, but the style is different, while a parody follows the style, but not necessarily the plot. Also, a travesty serves primarily for an amusement of the reader, while a parody is often a literary weapon.

== Etymology ==
Paul Scarron's title "Virgile travesti" gave rise to the English term for the genre. The French verb travestir means "to change the dress", "to disguise"; it also gave rise to other meanings of the word "travesty".

== Examples ==
Examples are multiple travesties of Virgil, such as Giovanni Battista Lalli's L'Eneide travestita (1634), Paul Scarron's "Virgile travesti" (1648–52) and Aloys Blumauer's "Virgil's Aeneid" (1783). In Shakespeare's A Midsummer Night's Dream (1595–96), the humorous retelling of the Pyramus and Thisbe legend may be considered as an early example of the genre.

In 1791 the Russian poet N. P. Osipov published Aeneid Turned Inside Out (Russian: Виргилиева Энеида, вывороченная наизнанку, lit. 'Vergil's Aeneid, turned inside out'). Ivan Kotliarevsky's mock-epic poem Eneida (Ukrainian: Енеїда), written in 1798, is considered to be the first literary work published wholly in the modern Ukrainian language. The Belarusian-language travesty, Aeneid Inside Out was written in the first half of the 19th century and attributed either to Vikentsiy Ravinski (Wincenty Rowiński) or to Ihnat Mankowsky.

== See also ==
- Burlesque
- Mock-heroic
- Paraphrase
