= Anna Haverland =

German stage actress

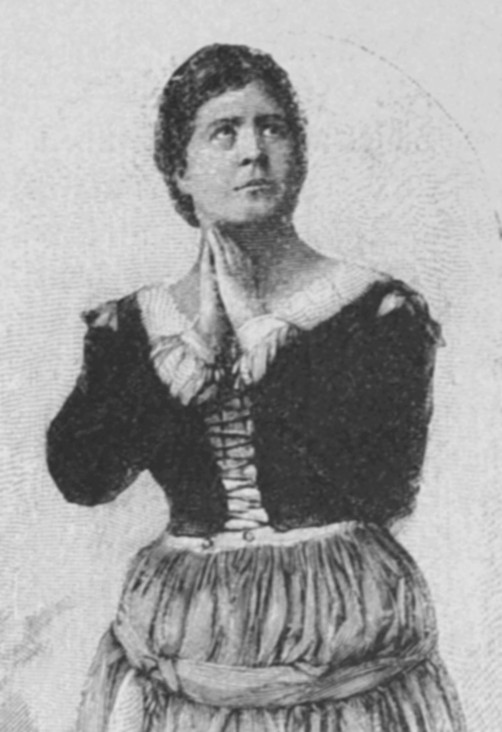
Anna Haverland as The Maid of Orleans

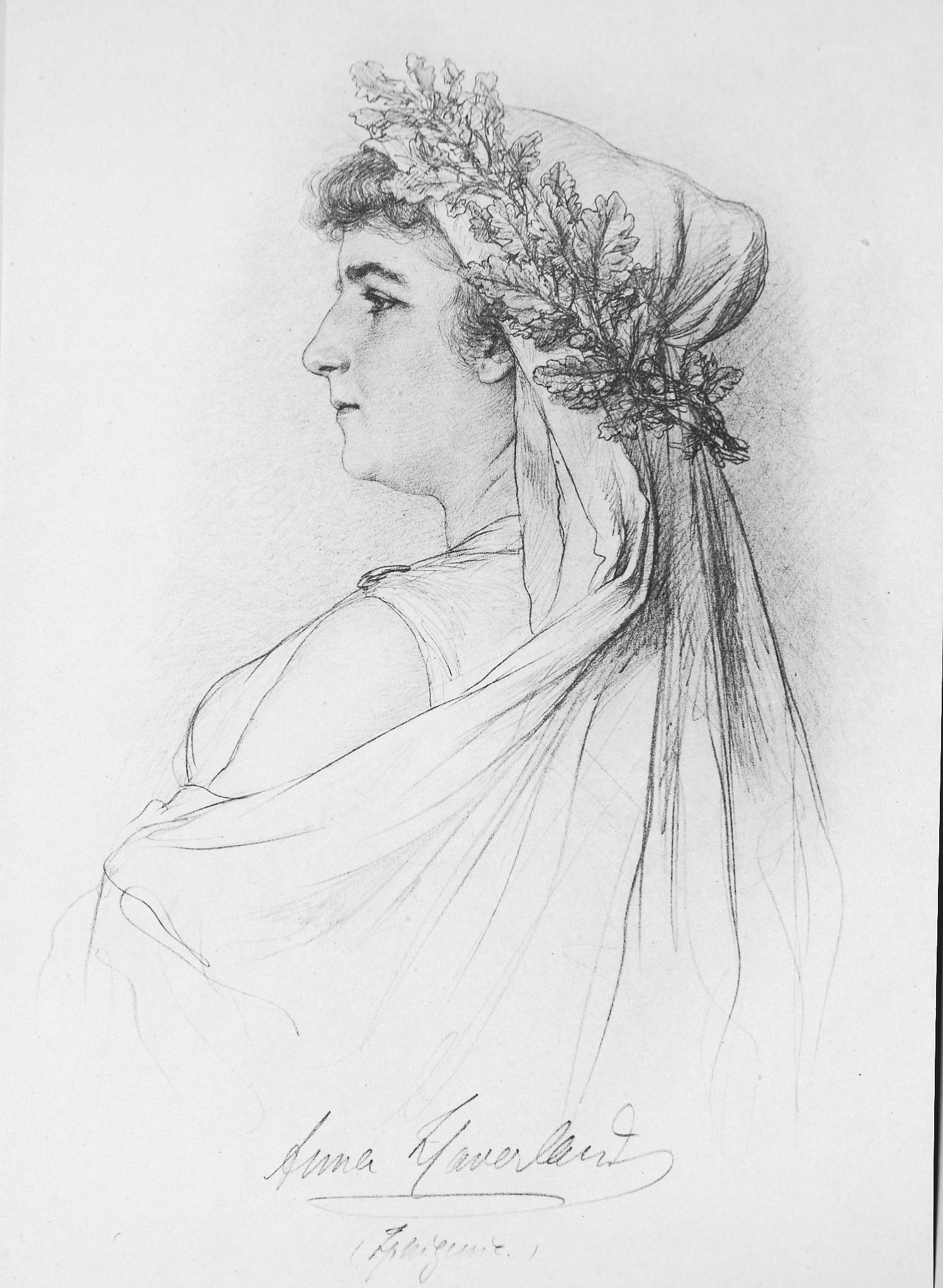
Anna Haverland as Iphigenie, Meiningen Court Theatre, ca. 1890

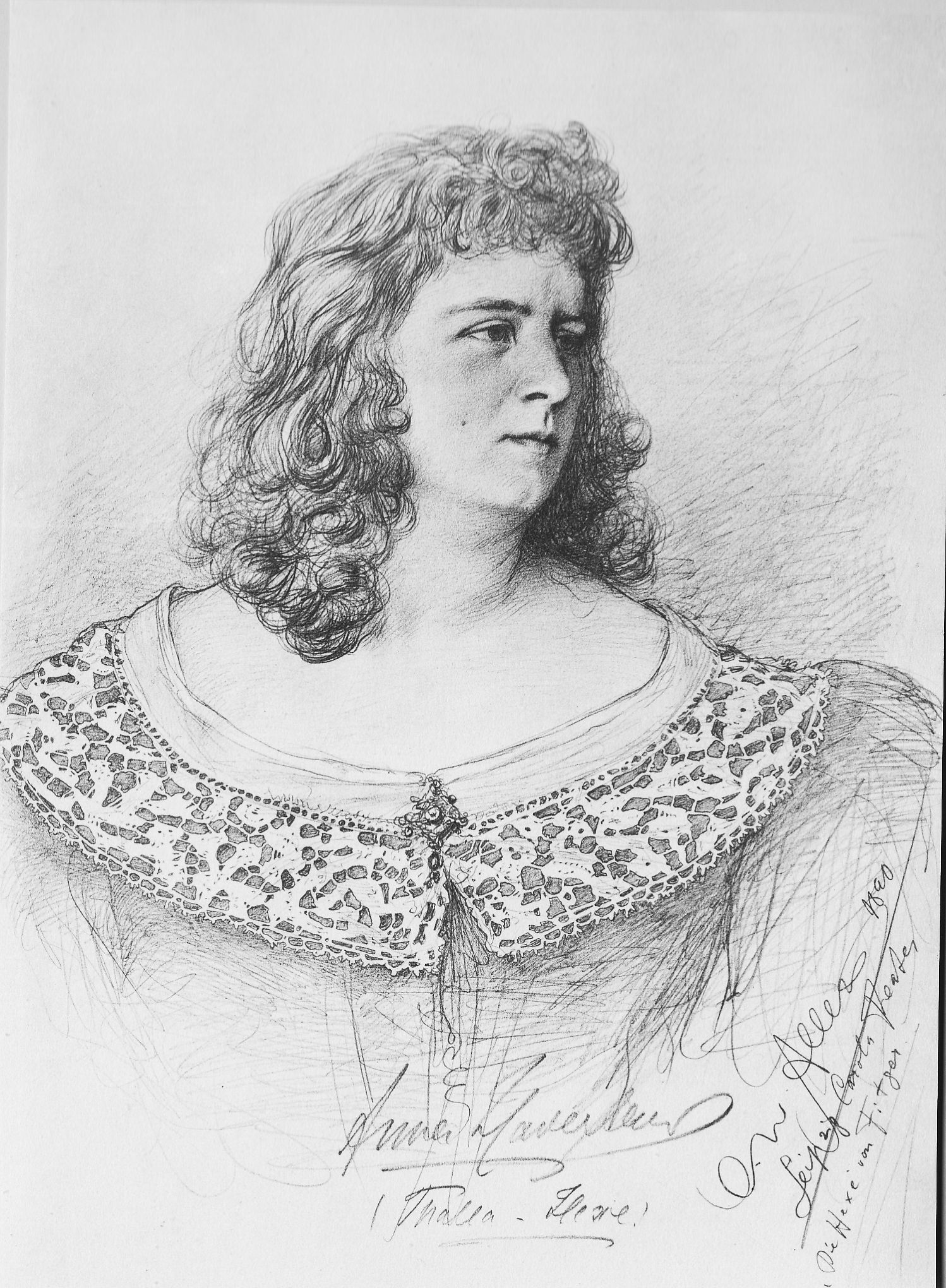
As Hexe in Die Hexe by Arthur Fitger, 1890

Anna Haverland (8 January 1854 – 31 May 1908) was a German actress who also worked as a writer.

== Life ==
Haverland trained as an actress in her home-town Berlin with Karl Gustav Berndal and Minona Frieb-Blumauer. She got her first engagement in 1871 at the Stadttheater Leipzig, where she was fixed on the role of the youthful lover. Her engagement in Leipzig ended in 1874; it followed an engagement at the Dresdner Hoftheater. There, she was cast in the heroine parts, played leading roles in modern plays and classical works, and gained general recognition "through the nobility of her conception and the noble sculpture of her movements". In 1877, she was engaged by Karl Hoff for the role of Germania at a festival honoring William I, on the occasion of his visit to the artists' association "Malkasten" in Düsseldorf.

This was followed by engagements at the Schauspielhaus Berlin (1878-1879), where she made her debut as The Maid of Orleans, and in Frankfurt (1880-1883). In addition, Haverland made numerous guest appearances with the ensemble of the Meiningen Court Theatre, including tours to London and St. Petersburg. Another engagement led her to the Deutsche Theater Berlin in 1883, where she played beside Josef Kainz. Contemporaries praised her performance of Antigone, Iphigenia, Sappho and Medea. In 1892, Haverland made a guest appearance in New York City, where she played the leading role in Ibsen's Hedda Gabler at the Amberg's Theatre. It was the first German performance of the play in America; Ibsen chose himself Haverland as the actress when the play was first performed at the Lessing Theatre in Berlin in February 1891. Haverland was in contact with other artists of her time, including Theodor Fontane. In the Berlin novel Allerlei Glück, which has remained in fragment form, Fontane placed the character of the theatre-loving Bertha, who is enthusiastic about the role of Iphigenie and chats with her friend Hanke about various plays, on a posthumous journey to Haverland. Johannes Schilling took the arm of Germania of the Niederwalddenkmal from Haverland's arm as a model.

Because of a serious illness, Haverland stopped her stage career in 1897, lived first in Berlin and finally moved to Dresden. She died in 1908 in Blasewitz at the age of 54. Obituaries praised her as "one of those generous artists [...] who seemingly can no longer live up to our days. Her name deserves a place of honour next to Charlotte Wolter, Klara Ziegler, Kathi Frank, and Eleonore Benzinger-Wahlmann."

== Work ==
- 1891: Lose Blätter (Skizzen)
- Die gnädige Frau ist nicht zu Hause (comedy, printed as manuscript)
- Adam Asper (comedy, printed as manuscript)
