= Hedwig Meyer =

German stage actress

Alwina Clara Hedwig Meyer (7 October 1841 – after 1916) was a German stage actress.

== Life ==
Born in Leipzig, Meyer was trained by Minona Frieb-Blumauer. Afterwards, she worked for three years as a young lover at the Thalia Theatre in Hamburg before she moved to the Wallnertheater in Vienna. She worked at several theatres in Berlin and in 1890, she got an engagement at the Deutsches Theater in Berlin, where she stayed until 1894, playing mainly Salondame. After several engagements at bigger theatres in Northern Germany, she retired from the stage in 1897. After that she lived married in Berlin.

Her siblings were the actors Clara Meyer and Adolf Meyer.
