= Adolf Meyer (actor) =

German stage actor

Adolf Meyer (16 March 1840 – 9 January 1890) was a German stage actor and theatre director.

== Life ==
Born in Leipzig, Meyer started his stage career at the court theatre in Dessau on 1 August 1857, where he worked as a hero for 18 years. In 1876, he moved to the municipal theatre in Cologne, then to Leipzig and Düsseldorf.

Among his most popular roles were Götz, Faust, Tell, Odoardo Galotti, Wallenstein etc. Besides his acting he also worked as a director.

His sisters were the actresses Clara and Hedwig Meyer.

Meyer died in Berlin at the age of 49.
