= Jean Rotrou =

French poet and tragedian (1609–1650)

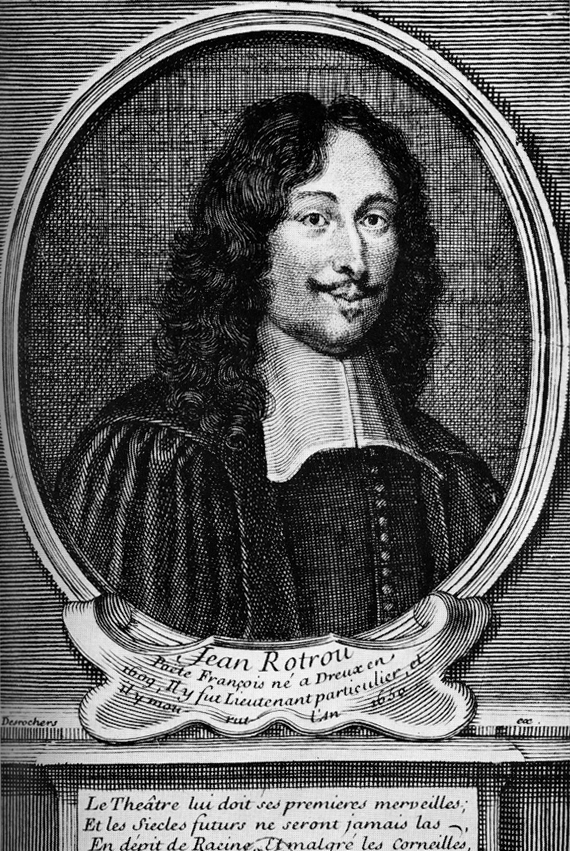
- Born: 21 August 1609; Dreux, France
- Died: 28 June 1650 (aged 40)
- Writing career
- Genres: poetry and tragedy
- Notable work: Antigone

Jean Rotrou (21 August 1609 – 28 June 1650) was a French poet and tragedian.

== Life ==
Rotrou was born at Dreux, city of the current department of Eure-et-Loir, in Centre-Val de Loire region. He studied at Dreux and at Paris, and, though three years younger than Pierre Corneille, began writing before him. In 1632, he became playwright to the actors of the Hôtel de Bourgogne. (This hall is the setting for the first act of Rostand's play Cyrano de Bergerac, and Rotrou's name is mentioned - as is Corneille's) With few exceptions, the only events recorded of Rotrou's life are the successive appearances of his plays, and his enrolment in 1635 in the band of five poets who had the duty of turning Richelieu's dramatic ideas into shape.

Rotrou's own first piece, L'Hypocondriaque (first published in 1631, probably staged in 1628; critical edition by JC Vuillemin [Droz, 1999]), dedicated to the Comte de Soissons, seigneur of Dreux, appeared when he was only eighteen. In the same year he published a collection of Œuvres poetiques, including elegies, epistles and religious verse. His second piece, La Bague de l'oubli (1635), an adaptation in part from the Sortija del Olvido of Félix Lope de Vega, was much more characteristic. It is the first of several plays in which Rotrou endeavoured to naturalize in France the romantic comedy which had flourished in Spain and England instead of the classical tragedy of Seneca and the classical comedy of Terence.

Corneille had leanings in the same direction. Rotrou's brilliant but hasty and unequal work showed the marks of a stronger adhesion to the Spanish model. In 1634, when he printed Cleagénor et Doristée (acted 1630), he said he was already the author of thirty plays; but this probably includes adaptations. Diane (acted 1630; pr. 1633), Les Occasions perdues (acted 1631; printed 1635), which won for him the favour of Richelieu, and L'Heureuse Constance (acted 1631; pr. 1635), which was praised by Anne of Austria, succeeded each other rapidly, and were all in the Spanish manner.

In 1631, Rotrou imitated Plautus in Les Ménechmes, and in 1634 Seneca in his Hercule mourant. Comedies and tragi-comedies followed. Documents exist showing the sale of four pieces to Antoine de Sommarille for 750 livres tournois in 1636, and in the next year he sold ten to the same bookseller. He spent much time at Le Mans with his patron, de Belin, who was one of the opponents of Corneille in the quarrel over Le Cid. It has been generally assumed, partly because of a forged letter long accepted as Corneille's, that Rotrou was his generous defender in this matter. He appears to have been no more than neutral, but is credited with an attempt at reconciliation between the parties in a pamphlet printed in 1637, L'Inconnu et veritable amy de messieurs de Scudéry et Corneille.

De Belin died in 1637, and in 1639 Rotrou bought the post of lieutenant particulier au baüliage at Dreux. In the next year he married Marguerite Camus, and settled down as a model magistrate and père de famille. Among his pieces written before his marriage were a translation of the Amphitryon of Plautus, under the title of Les Deux Sosies (1636), Antigone (1638), and Laure Persécutée (acted 1637; pr. 1639), in the opposite style to these classical pieces.

In 1646, Rotrou produced the first of his four masterpieces, Le Veritable Saint Genest (acted 1646; pr. 1648), a story of Christian martyrdom containing some amusing byplay, one noble speech and a good deal of dignified action. Rotrou uses with considerable success the device of a play within a play to assert a Christian perspective on the theatrum mundi theme. The Roman actor Genest becomes a real convert while playing the part of a Christian martyr. Incidentally (Act i. Sc. v.) Rotrou pays a noble tribute to the genius of Corneille. Don Bertrand de Cabrère (1647) is a tragi-comedy of merit; Venceslas (1647; pr. 1648) is considered in France his masterpiece, and has had several modern revivals; Cosroès (1649) has an Oriental setting, and is claimed as the only absolutely original piece of Rotrou.

These masterpieces follow foreign models, and Rotrou's genius is shown in the skill with which he simplifies the plot and strengthens the situations. Saint Genest followed Lope de Vega's Lo fingido verdadero; Venceslas followed the No ay ser padre siendo rey of Francisco de Rojas Zorrilla. In this play Ladislas and his brother both love the princess Cassandra; Ladislas makes his way into her house and in the darkness kills a man whom he thinks to be the duke of Courland, but who is really his brother Alexandre, the favoured lover. In the early morning he meets the king and is confronted by the duke of Courland. The outline of this incident is in the Spanish play, but there the spectators are aware of the ghastly mistake at the time of the murder. Rotrou shows his dramatic skill by concealing the real facts from the audience until they are revealed to the horror-struck Ladislas himself.

In 1650, the plague broke out at Dreux. Rotrou remained at his post, although urgently desired to save himself by going to Paris; caught the disease, and died shortly after. He was buried at Dreux on 28 June 1650. Rotrou's great fertility (he left thirty-five collected plays besides others lost, strayed or uncollected), and perhaps the uncertainty of dramatic plan shown by his hesitation almost to the last between the "classical" and the romantic style have injured his work. He has no thoroughly good play, hardly one thoroughly good act. But his situations are often pathetic and noble, and as a tragic poet properly so called he is at his best almost the equal of Corneille and of Jean Racine. His single lines and single phrases have a brilliancy and force not to be found in French drama between Corneille and Victor Hugo.

A complete edition of Rotrou was edited in five volumes by Viollet-le-Duc in 1822. In 1882 Louis de Ronchaud published a handsome edition of six plays—Saint Genest, Venceslas, Don Bertrand de Cabrère, Antigone, Hercule Mourant and Cosroes. Venceslas and Saint Genest are also to be found in the Chefs-d'œuvre Tragiques of the Collection Didot.

Rotrou's brother, Pierre Rotrou de Saudreville, left a memoir of him which is unfortunately lost, but this is cited by the Abbé Brillon (1671–1736) as his authority in a Notice biographique sur Jean Rotrou, first printed in 1885 at Chartres under the editorship of L. Merlet.

== Works ==
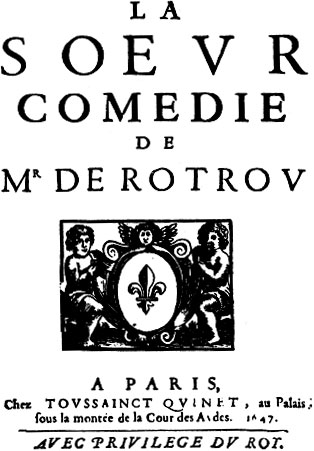
La sœur by Rotrou, Paris, T. Quinet (1647)

- Agésilan de Colchos, tragi-comédie, 1635.
- Amarillis
- Amélie, tragi-comédie, 1636.
- L'Aveugle de Smyrne
- Les Captifs, ou les Esclaves, comedy, 1638.
- L'Hypondriaque ou Le Mort amoureux, tragi-comédie, 1628.
- La bague de l'oubli, comedy, 1628.
- Cléagenor et Doristée, tragi-comédie, 1630.
- La Diane, comedy, 1630.
- L'Heureuse constance, tragi-comédie, 1631.
- Les Ménechmes, comedy, 1632.
- La Comédie des Tuileries
- Cosroès, tragédie, 1648.
- Dom Bernard de Cabrère, tragi-comédie, 1647.
- Dom Lope de Cardone, tragi-comédie, 1649.
- La Florimonde, comedy, 1649.
- Hercule mourant, tragedy, 1632.
- Laure persécutée, tragi-comédie, 1637.
- Métamorphose des yeux de Philis en astres
- La Naissance d'Hercule, ou l’Amphitryon
- Les Occasions perdues, tragi-comédie, 1631.
- La Sœur, comedy, 1645.
- Le Temple de la mort
- Venceslas, tragedy, 1647.
- Le Véritable Saint Genest, tragedy, 1646.
- Antigone, tragedy, 1638
- Iphigénie, tragedy, 1640.
- La Célimène, comedy, 1633.
- L'Heureux naufrage, tragi-comédie, 1633.
- La Céliane, tragi-comédie, 1634.
- La Belle Alphrède, comedy, 1634.
- La Pèlerine amoureuse, tragi-comédie, 1634.
- L'innocente infidélité, tragi-comédie, 1635.
- Clorinde, comedy, 1636.
- Les Deux Sosies, comedy, 1636.
- Les deux Pucelles, tragi-comédie, 1636.
- Crisante, tragedy, 1639.
- Clarice, comedy, 1641.
- La Bélisaire, tragédy, 1643.
- Célie ou Le Vice-roi de Naples, comedy, 1646.
