= Agnes Freund =

German stage actress

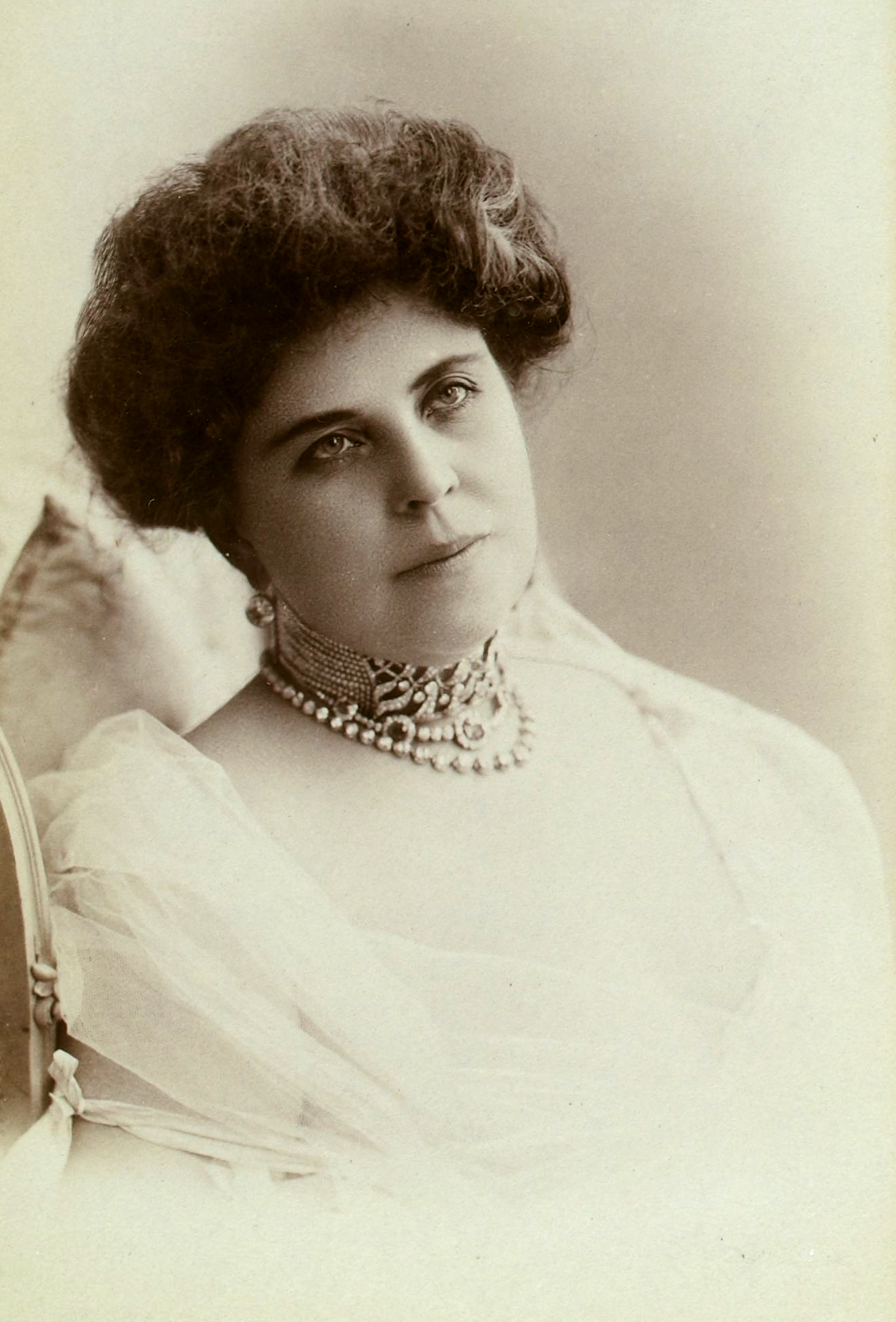
Agnes Freund

Agnes Freund (née Voß (13 July 1866 – after 1902) was a German stage actress.

== Life ==
Born in Königsberg, Agnes Voß was the daughter of the composer and staff trumpeter of the 1st Field Artillery Regiment Voß and his wife Ottilie. She made her debut in a children's roles at the municipal theatre of her home town as early as 1874. Because she was praised by the critics there, she got private lessons from actress Minona Frieb-Blumauer.

Early in the 1880s, she appeared in Halle as Klärchen in Goethe's Egmont. After some engagements in Halle and Berlin ("Neues Theater" und "Lessingtheater") she was only sporadically seen on German stages. Longer tours and guest performances took her to Graz, Vienna, Saint Petersburg and Moscow.

Freund began her career as a "young lover", but soon switched to the "tragic heroine". She was married to the publisher Carl Freund. For the writer Julius Stinde, Freund was a confidante, stimulator and first critic. Stinde commemorated her in the figure of the "Majoress of Wingleb" in his novel Der Liedermacher (1893). The book bears the dedication: "Frau Agnes Freund / née Voß / dedicated to the art-loving wife of my publisher / in / sincere admiration".

Some letters from Freund are in the estate of Julius Stinde, which is administered by the Staatsbibliothek zu Berlin.
