= Lina Frieb =

German soprano

Lina Frieb, real name Karoline Frieb, married name Karoline Mühldorfer (26 November 1845 – 27 August 1876) was a German operatic soprano.

== Life ==
Born in Vienna, Frieb was the daughter of the actress and singer Minona Frieb-Blumauer and the engineer Emanuel Frieb, devoted herself to the stage career and received her first dramatic lessons from her mother. She took singing lessons with choirmaster Johann Elsler in Berlin.

Frieb made her début on 24 November 1864 at the Niedersächsische Staatstheater Hannover as Benjamin in Joseph by Étienne Méhul. In 1866, she came to Berlin as a soubrette at the Staatsoper Unter den Linden, where she stayed until 1868, then sang at the Leipzig Opera for a year, and after a short but successful career as an artist, she appeared on stage for the last time on 31 May 1869. Zerline in Fra Diavolo and Marie in Tsar and Carpenter were also excellent performances by the popular singer.

In 1872, she married the Kapellmeister Wilhelm Mühldorfer. Lina Frieb Mühldorfer died in Leipzig at the age of 30.
