= Travesty =

A travesty is an absurd or grotesque misrepresentation, a parody, or grossly inferior imitation. In literary or theatrical contexts it may refer to:

- Burlesque, a literary, dramatic, or musical work intended to cause laughter by caricaturing the manner or spirit of serious works, or by ludicrous treatment of their subjects
- Travesti (theatre) (also spelled travesty), the portrayal of a character in a play, opera, or ballet by a performer of the opposite sex
- Victorian burlesque, a genre of theatrical entertainment popular in Victorian England and New York theatre in the mid-19th century
- Travesty generator or parody generator, a computer program that generates nonsensical text (travesty), often based on statistics of an input text
- Travesty (literature), a literary genre in which the plot of an actual myth or a serious literary work in retold in a comical form

== See also ==
- Travesti (gender identity), a term used in South American cultures for a person who was born male but has a feminine gender identity
- Travesties, a comedy by Tom Stoppard (1974)
- Texas Travesty, a humor magazine published by students at the University of Texas at Austin
