= Francisco de Rojas Zorrilla =

Spanish dramatist

Francisco de Rojas Zorrilla (4 October 1607 – 23 January 1648) was a Spanish dramatist. The main pieces of Rojas Zorrilla are Del rey abajo ninguno and No hay padre siendo rey (both published in the 1640s).

== Biography ==
Rojas Zorrilla was born at Toledo. He became a knight of Santiago in 1644. It is believed that he studied at the University of Toledo and University of Salamanca, and for a time followed a military career. His plays were published between 1640 and 1645; his greatest dramatic composition, Del rey abajo ninguno, was printed separately under the title of García del Castañar.

His works were adapted by authors outside Spain. No hay padre siendo rey was borrowed by Jean Rotrou for his Venceslas. Donde hay agravios no hay zelos and the Amo criado were imitated by Paul Scarron in his Jodelet Souffleté and Maître Valet. Entre Bobos anda el juego was the source of Thomas Corneille's Don Bertrand de Cigarral, as well as of Scarron's Don Japhel d'Arménie. Four foreign works derive from Obligados y ofendidos: Les Généreux Ennemis by François le Metel de Boisrobert, Les Illustres Ennemis by Thomas Corneille, Scarron's Écolier de Salamanque, and the story of Count Belflor and Leonor de Cespedes in Alain-René Lesage's novel Le Diable boiteux (1707). La traición busca el castigo is the basis of John Vanbrugh's False Friend and Lesage's Traître puni.

== Works in English translation ==
- La traición busca el castigo – Vanbrugh, John (1702). The False Friend. London: Jacob Tonson. (a free adaptation)
- Los Bandos de Verona ("The Factions in Verona") – in Cosens, F. W. (1874). Los bandos de Verona, Montescos y Capeletes. London: Chiswick Press. (partial translation)
- Del Rey Abajo Ninguno ("None Beneath the King") – in Alpern, Hymen (1963). Three Classic Spanish Plays. Washington Square Press.
- Los áspides de Cleopatra ("Cleopatra") – in Edwards, Gwynne (2005). Three Spanish Golden Age Plays. London: Methuen. ISBN 0-413-77475-9.

== Del Rey Abajo Ninguno ==
'Del Rey Abajo Ninguno' or 'None Beneath the King' in the English translation, is Rojas Zorrilla's most well-known work. Praised for its realism and natural plot, the play follows time-period accurate themes, including court life, honor, and class. As the work is known as a comedia, we see absurdism and comedy incorporated through characters like Bras who is characterized as a Gracioso in Spanish Golden Age works.

=== Plot ===
The story follows the noble García del Castanar, who lives disguised as a peasant with his wife Blanca. Blanca is also of noble lineage, however unaware. The King Alfonso XI visits García in disguise, impressed by his support for the King’s campaigns. A courtier, Don Mendo, seduces Blanca by pretending to be the King. García kills Mendo after suspecting betrayal from the King and kills Blanca in attempt to restore his honor. García discovers he did not actually kill the King; however, the King he grants him pardon and reveals García’s noble status.

=== Characters ===
- Don García, labrador.
- Doña Blanca, labradora.
- Teresa, labradora.
- Belardo, viejo.
- El Rey (1).
- La Reina (2).
- Don Mendo.
- Bras.
- El Conde De Orgaz, viejo.
- Tello, criado.
- Dos Caballeros.
- Musicos y Labradores.
