= Clara Meyer =

German stage actress

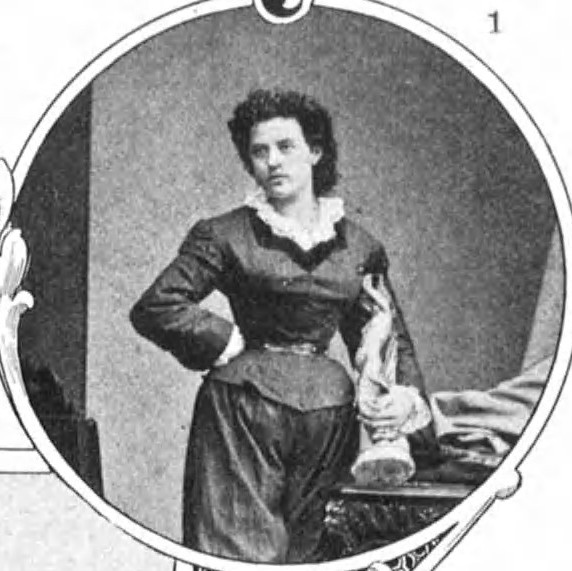
Clara Meyer

Clara Meyer, also Klara Meyer, (7 October 1848 – 24 July 1922) was a German stage actress

== Life ==
Born in Leipzig, Meyer, the daughter of a factory owner, attended the Düsseldorf ballet school and from 1867 performed on stage in Düsseldorf. In 1867, she was engaged in Dessau and was a tragic lover at the Schauspielhaus Berlin from 1871 until 1891 and from 1909 until 1912.

She appears several times in the theatre reviews of Theodor Fontane.

Her siblings Hedwig Meyer and Adolf Meyer also became theatre actors.

Meyer died in Berlin at the age of 73.
