= Bulteel =

Bulteel is a surname. Notable people with the surname include:

- Andrew Bulteel (1850–1888), English rugby union international
- Émile Bulteel (1906–1978), French water polo player
- John Crocker Bulteel (1793–1843), English politician
- John Bulteel (died 1669) (?–1669), English member of Parliament, friend of Pepys
- John Bulteel (writer) (c.1627–1692), English writer and translator, cousin of the above
