= René Le Pays =

French poet

Le Païs, sans mentir, est un bouffon plaisant; Mais je ne trouve rien de beau dans ce Voiture.

— Boileau, 1665

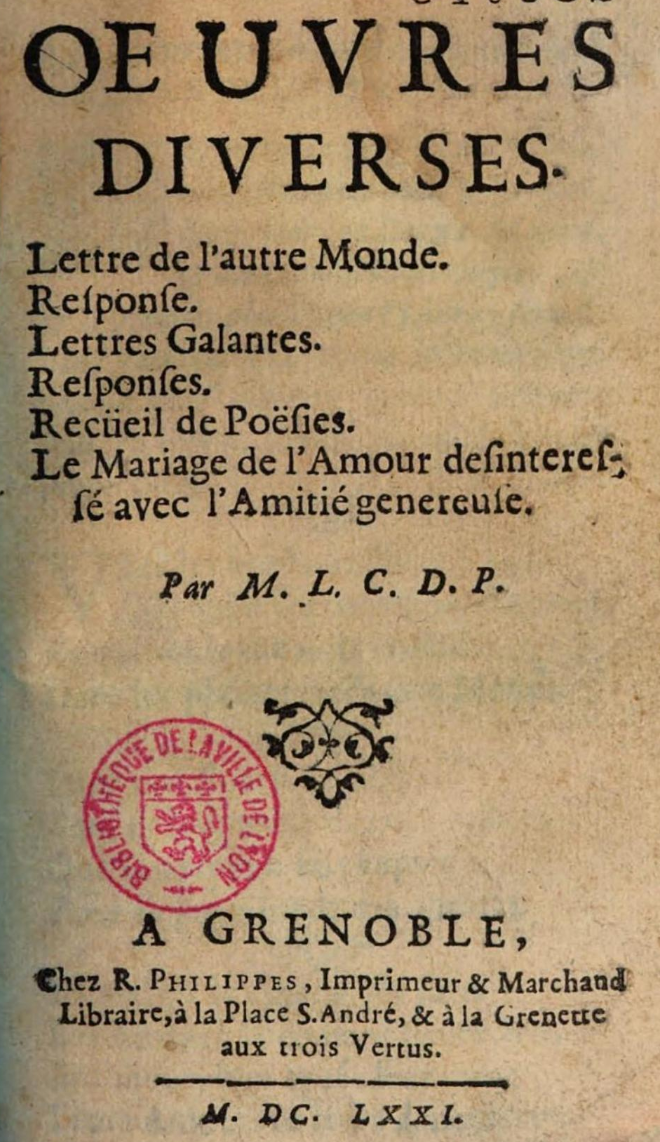
Œuvres diverses, 1671

René Le Pays, sieur de Plessis-Villeneuve (Nantes or Fougères, 1636 - Paris, April 30, 1690), sometimes credited as M.L.C.D.P., was a French poet and tax farmer-general (fermier général des gabelles) in Dauphiné and Provence.

He was a founding member of the Academy of Arles in 1668, and the Duke of Savoy conferred on him the Order of St. Maurice in 1670.

== Works ==
- Amitiés, Amours, et Amourettes, Grenoble 1664
- Zélotide, histoire galante, Paris 1665
  - Translated as The drudge, or The jealous extravagant, a piece of gallantry by John Bulteel, 1673
- Nouvelles Œuvres, 1672 (2 vols.)
- Le Démélé de l'Esprit et du Cœur, 1688

== Bibliography ==
- Biographie universelle, ancienne et moderne, ou Histoire, par ordre alphabétique, de la vie publique et privée de tous les hommes, ed. Michaud, 1811-1828 French Wikipedia Reference page, s.v. Le Pays (René)
- A General Biographical Dictionary, 2 s.v., drawn from Michaud
