= Catharine Jacobi =

German stage actress

Catharine Jacobi, née Katharina Bußler, also Katharina Jacobi, (4 November 1837 – 24 June 1912) was a German stage actress.

== Life ==
Born in Berlin, Jacobi, the daughter of a secret court councillor and granddaughter of the tenor Karl Adam Bader, was trained by Minona Frieb-Blumauer and made her debut as Lorle in 1858 in Dorf und Stadt at the Thaliatheater in Hamburg, where she was engaged for the role of youthful lover and Salondame. She had rehearsed this play with Charlotte Birch-Pfeiffer.

From 1862 until 1867, she worked at the court theatre in Weimar, where she successfully appeared in the first performance of Shakespeare's royal dramas (April 1864 in Dingelstedt's establishment) and in the first performance of the Wallenstein trilogy as Thekla. In 1867, the talented actress applied to the court theatre in Mannheim, which she accepted, even after she had been happy with her guest performance. Over the years, she changed from first-lover roles to character portraits and comic old men.

In addition to her acting abilities, she also tried her luck as a writer.

Gertrude, Jacobi's daughter with the character actor Hermann Jacobi, was engaged as an actress in Zurich and Poznan.

Jacabi died in Mannheim at the age of 74.

== Work ==
- Weihnachten
- Coeur Dame
- Das verwunschene Königskind, dramatised fairy tale.

== Awards ==
- Order of the Zähringer Lion: Anniversary Medal Silver Medal for Art and Science on the Ribbon of the Order of the Lion of Zähringen (to be worn on the left breast).
