= Olga Arendt =

German writer and actress

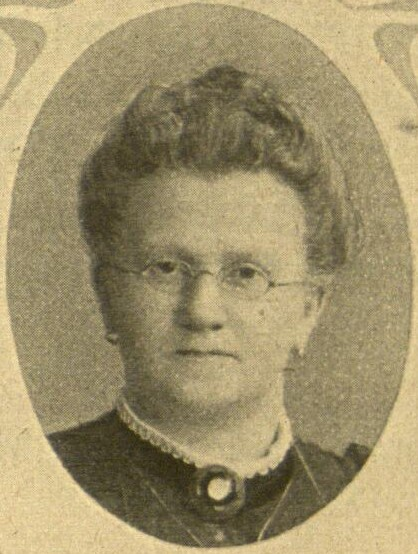
Lina Morgenstern, Arendt' mother

Olga Arendt, (née Olga Morgenstern, pseudonym Rosa Morgan; 19 November 1859 – 29 May 1902) was a German writer and stage actress.

== Life ==
Arendt was born in Berlin as the daughter of the merchant Theodor Morgenstern and the feminist and writer Lina Morgenstern. She attended the Bussesche Höhere Mädchenschule until she was 16 years old. Afterwards she trained as a kindergarten teacher. Her plan to become an actress was forbidden by her father. After finishing her training she ran a private kindergarten, which her mother had founded. In addition, she took acting lessons with Minona Frieb-Blumauer and after three years passed an examination of the Berlin court theatre with director Botho von Hülsen, who recommended her to the court theatre in Koburg-Gotha as a young lover. Due to the family's financial difficulties, her father also agreed to join Arendt's stage career.

After two years Arendt left the theatre for good and worked in Berlin as a rhetorical and dramatic teacher from 1886 to 1893. One of her pupils was the later actress Gertrud Berry. In Vienna, she learned declamation by the actor and reciter Joseph Lewinsky for half a year. She wrote her first poems and stories, which she presented in recitals in Mecklenburg, Silesia and Poznan. She went on lecture tours in Vienna and Germany.

In 1893, she married Otto Arendt, a member of the Landtag and publicist, and retired from public life. After the birth of their third child, Arendt fell ill with edema around 1899 and died of the disease in Berlin in 1902 at the age of 42.

== Work ==
- Für gesellige Kreise. Sammlung ernster und heiterer Deklamationsstücke, nebst einem Anhang von Gelegenheitsgedichten. With a foreword by Minona Frieb-Blumauer. Edited by Olga Morgenstern. Rosenbaum & Hart, Berlin 1888.
- Märchen-Bilderbuch von Olga Morgenstern. Dichtung zu lebenden Bildern, mit genauer Anweisung zur Aufstellung und geeigneten Musik-Begleitung. Bloch, Berlin 1891.
- Sylvesternacht. Romantische Erzählung. Walther, Berlin 1893.
- Ein Freundschaftstag. Lustspiel in 1 Akt. Böoch, Berlin 1894.
- Gedichte von Olga Arendt-Morgenstern. Nach ihrem Tode herausgegeben von Lina Morgenstern. Deutsche Hausfrauenzeitung, Berlin 1903.
- Ullas Kindheit. Eine Erzählung für 8 bis 14jährige Mädchen und Knaben von Olga Arendt-Morgenstern. Edited by Lina Morgenstern. Deutsche Hausfrauenzeitung, Berlin 1903.
