= Ivan Kotliarevsky =

Ukrainian writer (1769–1838)

- Іван Котляревський
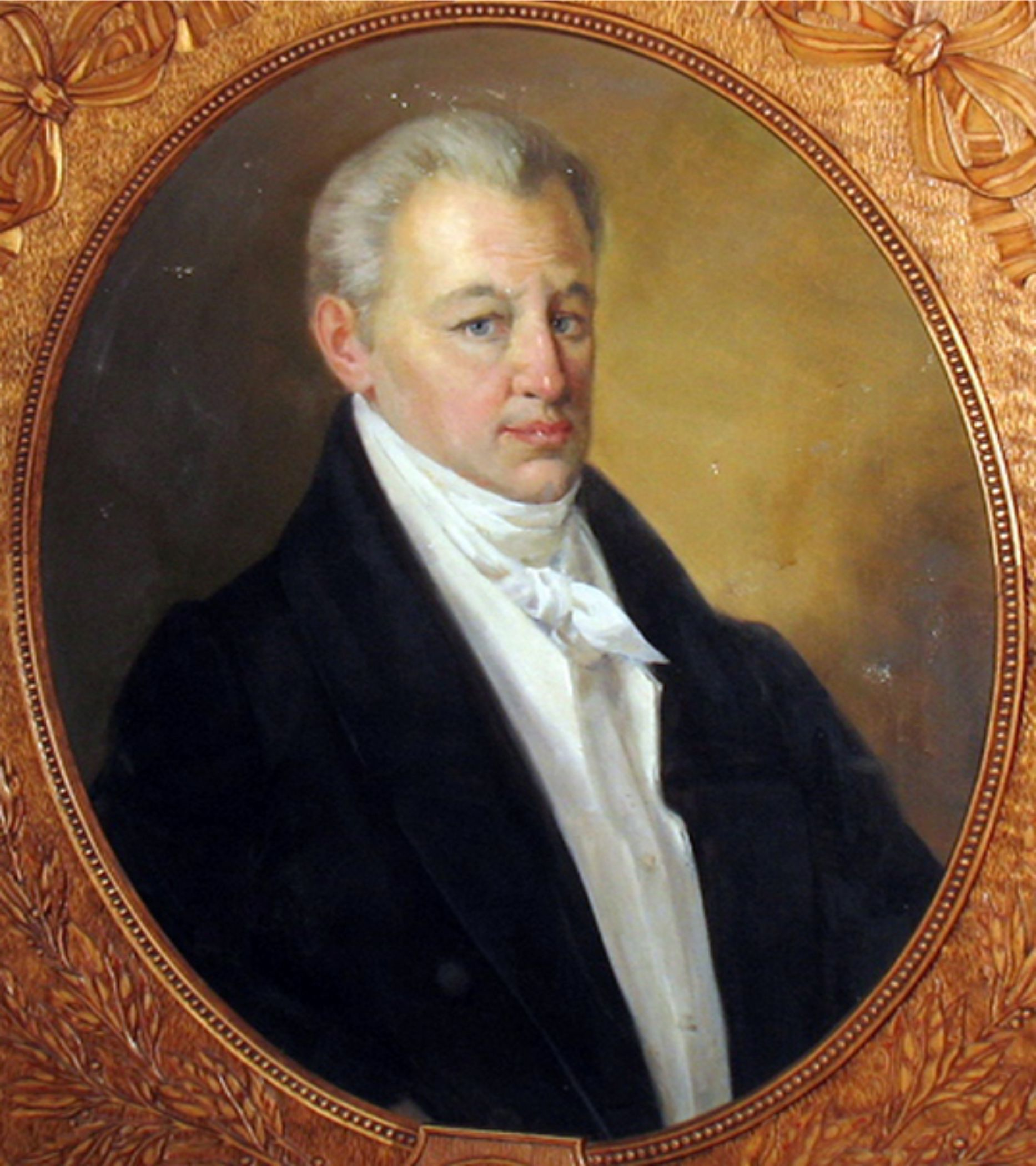
- Portrait of Kotliarevsky
- Born: 29 August 1769 O.S. (9 September 1769 N.S.); Poltava, Russian Empire (now Ukraine)
- Died: 29 October 1838 (aged 69) O.S. (10 November 1838 N.S.); Poltava, Russian Empire

Ivan Petrovych Kotliarevsky (Ukrainian: Іван Петрович Котляревський, IPA: [iˈwɑn petˈrɔwɪt͡ʃ kotlʲɐˈrɛu̯sʲkɪi̯]; 9 September [O.S. 29 August] 1769 – 10 November [O.S. 29 October] 1838) was a Ukrainian writer, poet, playwright, and social activist, regarded as the pioneer of modern Ukrainian literature. His main work is the poem Eneida, a travesty of Virgil's Aeneid.

== Biography ==
Kotliarevsky was born on 9 September [O.S. 29 August] 1769 in the Ukrainian city of Poltava in the family of clerk Petro Kotliarevsky. The Kotliarevskys belonged to the Ukrainian nobility but were not wealthy. They owned a small estate in Poltava and a plot of land nearby. After studying at the Poltava Theological Seminary (1780–1789), he worked as a tutor for the gentry at rural estates, where he became familiar with Ukrainian folk life and the peasant vernacular. He served in the Imperial Russian Army between 1796 and 1808 in the Siversky Karabiner Regiment. Kotliarevsky participated in the Russo-Turkish War (1806–1812) as a staff-captain, during which the Russian troops laid the siege to the city of Izmail. In 1808 he retired from the Army. In 1810 he became the trustee of an institution for the education of children of impoverished nobles. In 1812, during the French invasion of Russia he organized the 5th Ukrainian Cossack Regiment in the town of Horoshyn (Khorol uyezd, Poltava Governorate) under the condition that it will be left after the war as a permanent military formation. For that he received a rank of major.

He helped stage theatrical productions at the Poltava governor-general's residence and was the artistic director of the Poltava Free Theater between 1812 and 1821. In 1818 together with Vasyl Lukashevych , V. Taranovsky, and others he became a member of the Poltava Freemasonry Lodge Liubov do istyny (Love of truth). Kotliarevsky participated in the buyout of actor Mikhail Shchepkin out of the serfdom. From 1827 to 1835 he directed several philanthropic agencies. He died on 10 November [O.S. 29 October] 1838. Shortly before his death, he released his serfs and distributed his property to relatives and acquaintances. He was buried in Poltava.

== The first modern Ukrainian writer ==
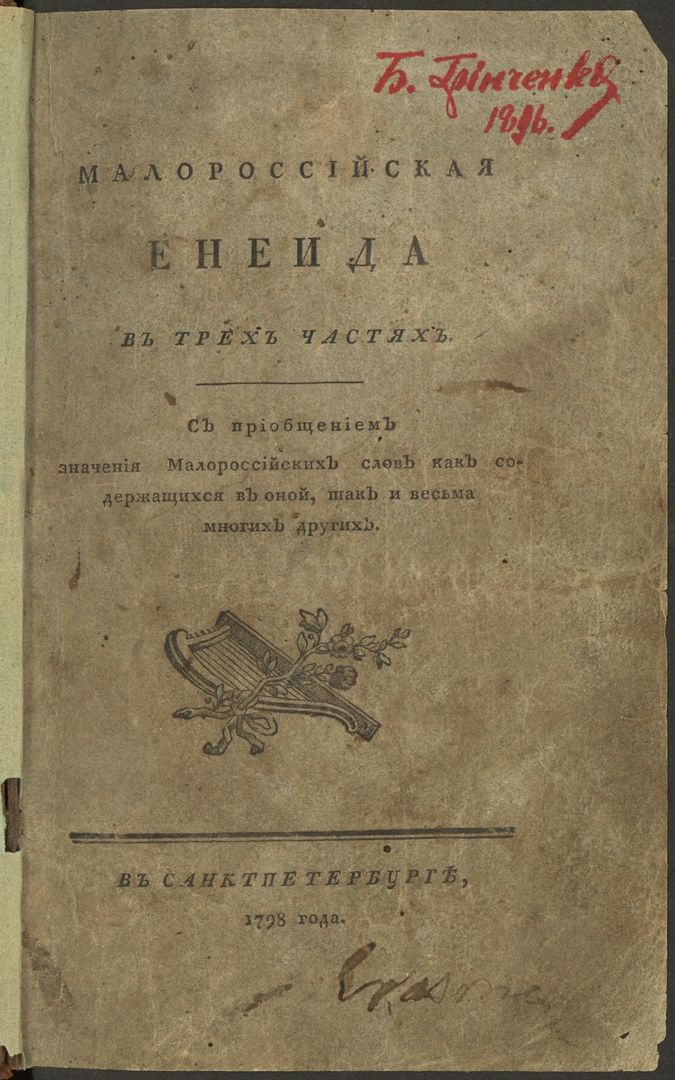
The first edition of Kotliarevsky's Eneida, 1798.

Kotliarevsky wrote his first poems while a student at the Poltava Theological Seminary and published them in the satirical almanac Poltavska mukha (Poltava fly). He began work on his best-known literary work, the travesty poem Eneida (Ukrainian: Енеїда), in 1794. The first three parts were published in Saint Petersburg (without the author's permission) in 1798. Its publication is usually regarded as the starting point of modern Ukrainian literature, as it marked the beginning of the use of vernacular Ukrainian as a literary language. The fourth part was published in 1809, and the fifth and sixth parts were completed around 1820, although the first complete edition of the work was published only in 1842, after the author's death.

Kotliarevsky's Eneida built upon a tradition of travesties of Virgil's Aeneid in European literature. In particular, its main model was the earlier poem Aeneid Turned Inside Out (Russian: Виргилиева Энеида, вывороченная наизнанку, lit. 'Vergil's Aeneid, turned inside out') published in 1791 by the Russian poet Nikolay Osipov (completed by Alexander Kotelnitsky), but Kotliarevsky's work is absolutely different. In Eneida, the Trojan heroes of the Aeneid are transformed into Zaporozhian Cossacks while the Olympian gods become merciless landlords. It reflects the memory of the recently destroyed Zaporozhian Sich and Cossack Hetmanate and the current high point of Russian-imposed serfdom in Ukraine. It satirizes the social classes of the past and present eras. The work became very popular in its time and inspired a number of imitations. With Eneida, Kotliarevsky also introduced into Ukrainian poetry accentual-syllabic verse, which replaced the earlier syllabic versification deemed less suitable for the randomly stressed Ukrainian language. He used iambic tetrameter in ten-line strophes with regular rhymes.

Kotliarevsky's two plays, the comedy Natalka Poltavka (Natalka from Poltava, 1819) and the vaudeville Moskal-Charivnyk (The soldier-sorcerer), played a major role the development of Ukrainian national theater.

== Views ==
Pavlo Petrenko writes that Kotliarevsky's worldview was "guided by moral rather than by sociopolitical criteria, and his sympathy for the socially and nationally oppressed Ukrainian peasantry was subordinated to his loyalty to tsarist autocracy."

== Legacy ==
According to Pavlo Petrenko, "Kotliarevsky's influence is evident not only in the works of his immediate successors (Hryhorii Kvitka-Osnovianenko, Taras Shevchenko, Yakiv Kukharenko, K. Topolia, Stepan Pysarevsky, and others), but also in the ethnographic plays of the second half of the 19th century and in Russian (the works of the ethnic Ukrainians Nikolai Gogol and Vasilii Narezhny) and Belarusian (the anonymous Eneida navyvarat [The Aeneid Inside Out]) literature."

Kotliarevsky's complete works were published in Kyiv 1952–3 and 1969. In 1952, the Kotliarevsky Museum was opened in Poltava. The Kharkiv I. P. Kotlyarevsky National University of Arts, in Kharkiv, Ukraine, is named after him. Monuments to Kotlyarevsky were erected in Kyiv (sculptor G. Kalchenko, architect A. Ignashchenko) and in Poltava (sculptor L. Pozen, architect A. Shirshov). Numerous boulevards and streets in Ukrainian cities are named after the poet, the largest ones being in Kyiv, Poltava, Chernihiv, Vinnytsia, Khmelnytskyi, Chernivtsi, Pryluky, Lubny and Berdychiv.

== English translations ==
The first few stanzas of Kotliarevsky's Eneida were translated into English by Wolodymyr Semenyna and published in the Ukrainian-American newspaper Ukrainian Weekly on 20 October 1933. However, the first complete English translation of the work was published only in 2004 by Ukrainian-Canadian Bohdan Melnyk.
