= Elke Blumauer =

German handball player (born 1963)

Personal information
- Nationality: German
- Born: 23 July 1963 (age 63) Offenbach am Main, West Germany
- Height: 176 cm (69 in)

Sport
- Sport: Handball
- Current club: Retired

Senior clubs
- Years: Team
- 1981-1983: Vfb 1900 Giessen
- 1983-1984: SG Kleeheim
- 1984-1987: PSV Grünweiß Frankfurt
- 1987-1988: TV Lützellinde
National team
- Years: Team
- –: West Germany

Elke Blumauer (born 23 July 1963) is a German handball player who played for the West German national team. She was born in Offenbach am Main. She represented West Germany at the 1984 Summer Olympics in Los Angeles, where the West German team placed fourth.
