= Eneida navyvarat =

Belarusian mock-heroic poem

- by Unknown (attributed to Vikenty Ravinsky)
- Original title: Энеіда навыварат
- Country: Russian Empire
- Language: Belarusian
- Subject: Parody of Virgil's Aeneid

Eneida navyvarat (Belarusian: Энеіда навыварат; "Aeneid Inside Out") is a mock-heroic poem, one of the first major works of modern Belarusian literature. Written between 1812 and the early 1830s, it is a travesty (burlesque) parodying the epic poem Aeneid by the ancient Roman poet Virgil. Only a fragment of the poem (half of the 1st canto) has survived.

== History and authorship ==
The poem was written after 1812 but no later than the early 1830s. The first dated manuscript copies date back to 1837. The first publication (a fragment) appeared in the St. Petersburg journal Mayak in 1845, and a more complete version was published in the Smolenskiy Vestnik in 1890.

The authorship of the poem has been a subject of debate. It has been attributed to residents of the Vitebsk region such as Ihnat Mańkoŭski and K. Mysłoŭski. However, most researchers believe that the poem originated in the western Smolensk region, which is closely linked to Belarus, and was written by Vikenty Ravinsky, a participant in the War of 1812. Recent research has confirmed this conclusion.

== Content and style ==
The poem belongs to a series of travesty "Aeneids" that appeared in many European literatures starting from the 17th century as a democratic reaction to classicism. The closest models for the author of Eneida navyvarat were the corresponding Ukrainian (by Ivan Kotliarevsky) and Russian (by N. Osipov) works. While borrowing the plot (the adventures of the legendary hero Aeneas, the founder of the state in ancient Latium) from his predecessors, the author created an original work filled with the realities of Belarusian life during the era of serfdom.

The work has a distinct democratic, anti-feudal orientation. The author endows the Trojans (Aeneas's companions) with the traits of Belarusian serfs, portraying them as a quick-witted, hardworking, and life-loving people. The ancient gods (Juno, Aeolus) and other characters (Dido) are depicted as landowners and their helpers. The author demonstrates a perfect knowledge of Belarusian folklore and the great expressive possibilities of the Belarusian language (specifically the East Belarusian dialect). The work is rich in tonality and colors. Despite naturalistic passages and vulgarisms caused by the specifics of the travesty genre, Eneida navyvarat played a significant role in the formation of modern Belarusian literature and is considered a treasure of Belarusian poetry.

== Publications ==
- Карский Е. (1909). Белорусская Энеида наизнанку [Belarusian Aeneid Inside Out]. Сборник Харьковского историко-филологического общества (in Russian). 18.
- Энеіда навыварат. Тарас на Парнасе: Паэмы [Aeneid Inside Out. Taras on Parnassus: Poems] (in Belarusian). Мінск. 1982.

== Literature ==
- Карский Е. Ф. (1922). Белорусы. Т. 3, ч. 3 [Belarusians. Vol. 3, part 3] (in Russian). Петроград.
- Кісялёў, Г. (1971). Загадка беларускай «Энеіды» [The Riddle of the Belarusian "Aeneid"] (in Belarusian). Мінск.
- Кісялёў, Г. (1989). Разыскивается классик... [Wanted: A Classic...] (in Belarusian). Мінск.
- Кісялёў, Г. (1996). Слядамі «Энеіды» [In the Footsteps of the "Aeneid"]. Полымя (in Belarusian) (10).
