= Virgile travesti =

French poem by Paul Scarron (1648)

Virgile travesti is a parody of the Aeneid written by Paul Scarron in 1648. It was inspired by Giovanni Battista Lalli's L'Eneide travestita (The Aeneid Disguised, 1633). It is an early example of French burlesque literature. Produced in eight volumes, the last book in the work was not published until 1659.

The title gave rise to the English term for the literary genre of travesty.
