= Minona Frieb-Blumauer =

German actress

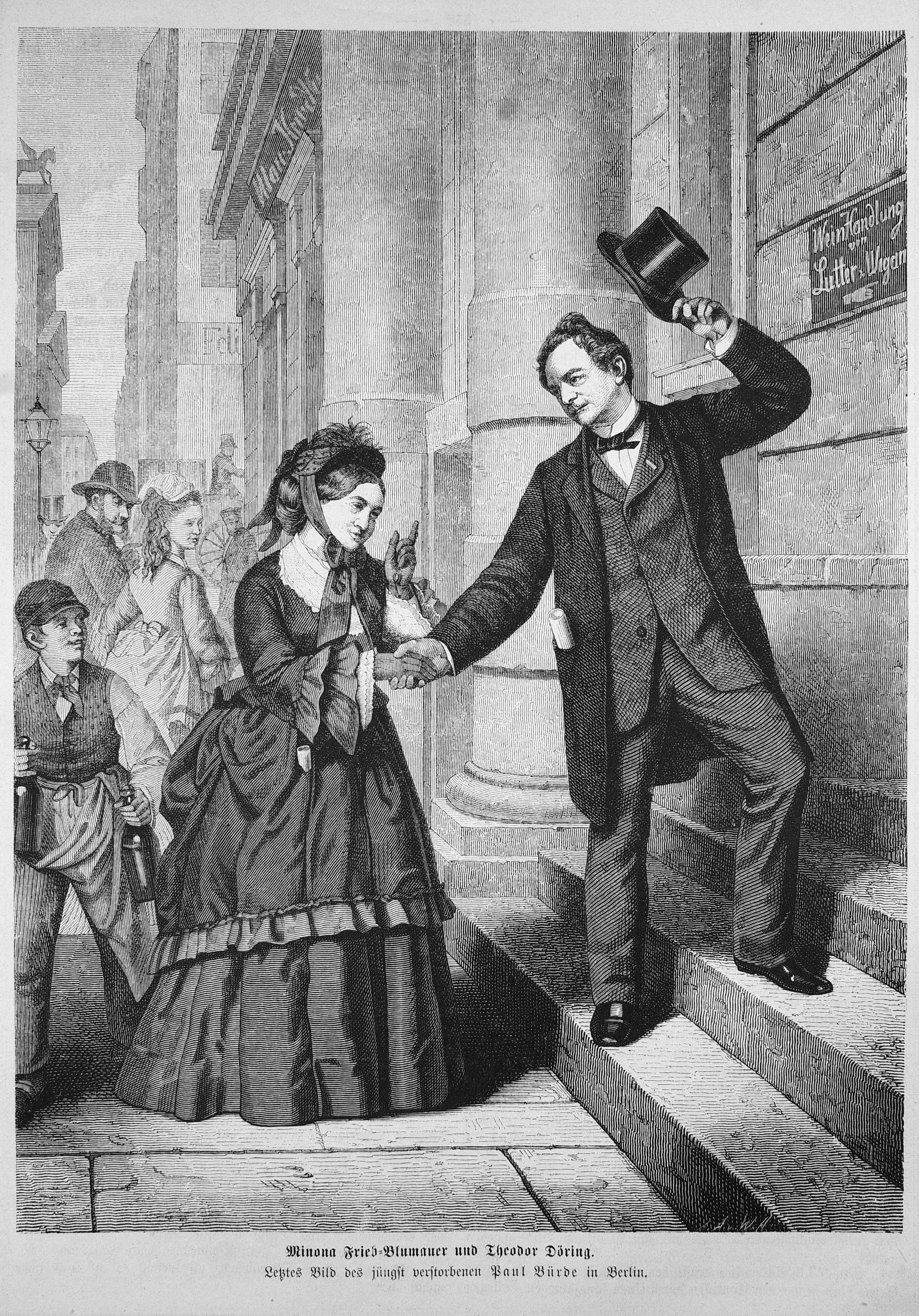
Minona Frieb-Blumauer and Theodor Döring, wood engraving by Paul Bürde

Minona Frieb-Blumauer (born Johanna Blumauer; 11 May 1816 – 31 July 1886) was a German actress and singer.

== Life ==
Born in Stuttgart, Minona was the daughter of actor Karl Blumauer, with whom she received her first lessons. Already as a child, she appeared in Neustrelitz in der Freischütz and 1828 in Gotha as a boy in the Magic Flute. She studied singing for three years at the Prague Conservatory and was immediately engaged for a guest performance in Darmstadt. She stayed there for three years and then moved to Cologne and Aachen, where she performed successfully under Julius Mühling, especially in Gioachino Rossini's operas, for example as Rosine in The Barber of Seville.

As her voice was not up to the demands in the long run, she switched to spoken theatre. Karl Immermann brought her to Düsseldorf and under his guidance she developed into an outstanding actress. After she had worked as a youthful and lively lover in Meiningen and finally in Brno, she married an engineer, Emanuel Frieb, in 1839. Their daughter, Karoline "Lina" Frieb (1845-1876), became an opera singer. After a break, she only appeared again in 1841 at the Wiedener and Carltheater in Vienna, where Moritz Gottlieb Saphir had recommended her.

A guest performance by Friedrich Beckmann was the reason why the still young woman changed over to character studies and took over roles of mature women. During a guest performance in Vienna Theodor Döring saw the actress in several older and comical roles. After his return, he arranged for Frieb-Blumauer to be invited to a rehearsal guest performance in Berlin, which she performed with great success. In 1854, she got a ten-year and later a lifelong contract with the royal playhouse. Among her pupils were Anita Augspurg, Olga Arendt, Agnes Freund and Anna Haverland.

Gustav Heinrich Gans zu Putlitz characterised the actress as follows:

Same time she first entered the royal stage in Berlin, where her name was hardly known at that time, it must have been about 20 years ago, she caused a great stir because of the pertinent characteristics with which she drew her characters, and especially because of the rich and original inventiveness for an abundance of comically piquant and sharp details with which she enlivened her playing. And yet, despite the immediately decided preference of the audience, she had to slowly conquer her ground, namely her roles. But it did not last long, and Frieb-Blumauer had a whole series of roles, in plays written especially for her; for what comedy poet would not have liked to have gained a talent for his work, which already guaranteed part of the success through his participation. It would be wrong to call Mrs. Frieb-Blumauer a speciality as an actress, because that would limit the field of her performances, would mean attributing to her peculiarities which only point to this or that exceptional role. On the contrary, she is a master of her subject, which is called "the comic old woman", to the most extensive degree; For if we exclude the older, serious roles for which the organ does not have enough of its own, but with which the artist has nevertheless often enough skilfully put up with, then the mothers in the play, right down to the farce, the comic character roles and batches belong in her circle of roles, and as equally often as the tasks which this subject presents her with are, she has still managed to gain or create some peculiarity in each of them.

Similarly describes Gotthilf Weisstein the character and effect of the actress.:

The so-called "comic old men", as they are called in the jargon of actors, were artistic achievements which often rose far above the literary value of the sitter; whoever has seen their "wicked stepmother", their "Räthin Seefeld" etc., will not be able to forget these miniature pictures of noblest realism, masterly executed down to the smallest detail. When she used to play Kotzebue, she always stood far above his somewhat shallow and feeble humour; when she later became the sole ruler of the Benedix genre in our country, she also breathed in his philistine jokes, his phlegmatic comforting spirit, and lifted his figures vividly and vividly from the low bas-relief in which they are chiseled out. Her playing was always characteristic and in the ensemble, when she had to play a supporting role, yet decent and reserved. She mastered all registers of humour, whether she played a cook ("servants"), a distinguished old lady (Frau von Gühsen), whether she appeared in a modern comedy (Madame Michoud in the Bust) or in a classical comedy (Martha Schwertlein) - her victorious, humorous temperament swept everything away with her, up on stage as well as down in the hall

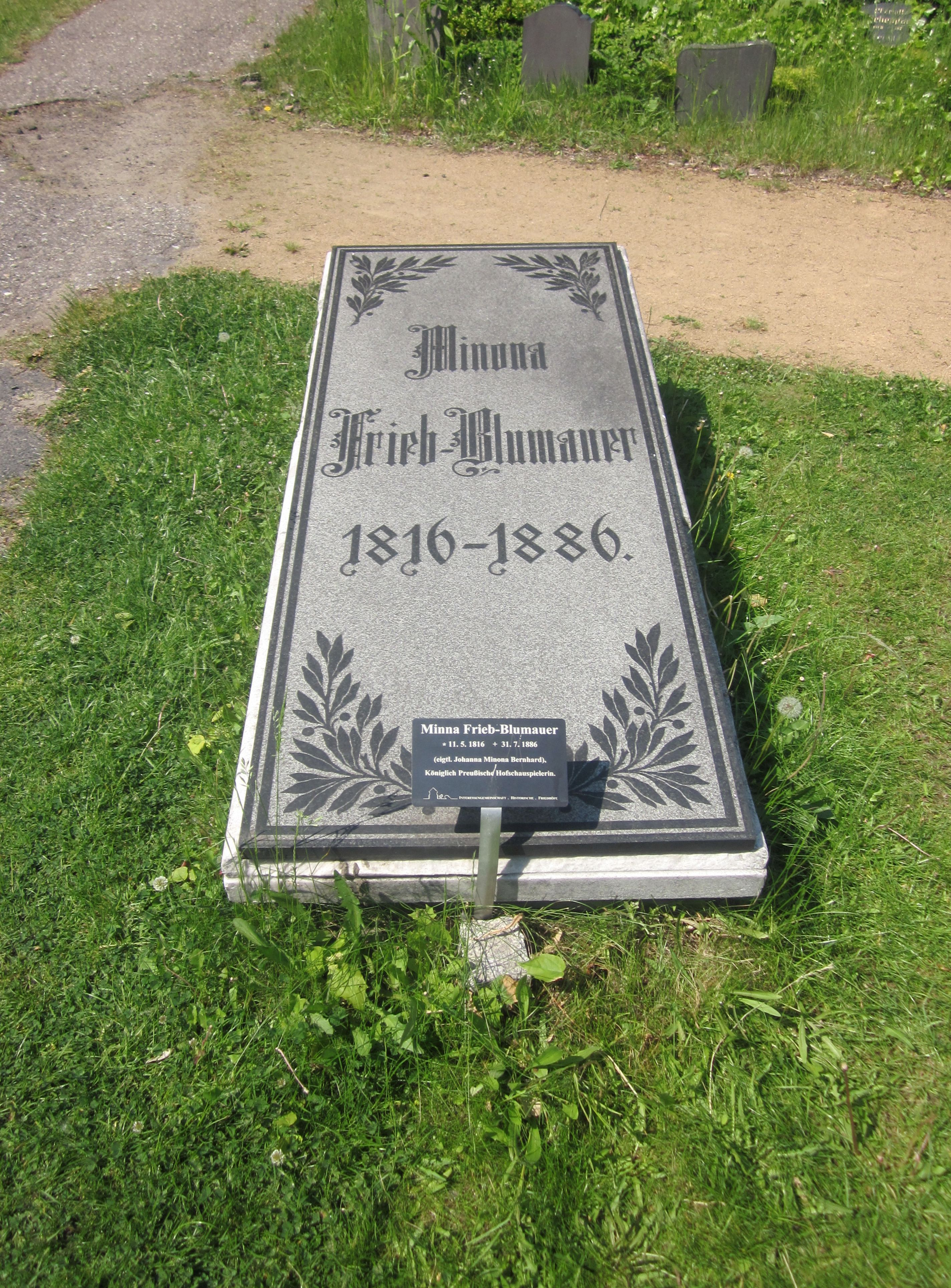
Frieb-Blumauer's grave in Berlin-Kreuzberg

Shortly after a stay at a health resort in Wiesbaden, from which she had returned apparently recovered, Frieb-Blumauer died unexpectedly on 31 July 1886 at the age of 70 in Berlin. The funeral service, conducted by Theodor Hossbach, the pastor of the Deutscher Dom at Gendarmenmarkt, took place on August 4 in the flat of the deceased in Zimmerstraße. With great participation of representatives of Berlin and foreign theatre life as well as the local population, the coffin was then led to the Friedhöfe vor dem Halleschen Tor in front of the Hallesches Tor, where the funeral took place, near the last resting place of its patron Theodor Döring, who had died eight years earlier. The eulogy at the grave was delivered by Arthur Deetz, director of the Königliches Schauspielhaus. The preserved grave site is marked by a plate with inscription and ornaments.

== Students ==
- Anita Augspurg, Olga Arendt, Agnes Freund, Anna Haverland, Catharine Jacobi, Laura Friedmann, Hedwig Meyer, Amanda Tscherpa
