= Adolf Schulze =

German baritone

Adolf Schulze (13 April 1835 – April 1920) was a German baritone and music educator.

== Life ==
Schulze was born in Panten, Duchy of Holstein. Schulze initially worked as an elementary school teacher in Hamburg. There, he also received his first vocal pedagogy training from Karl Voigt, which was later refined in London with the singer and music teacher Manuel Garcia.

Since 1864, he was active as a concert and oratorio singer in Hamburg. In addition, Schulze gave singing lessons there. In the mid-1870s, he was appointed professor and conductor of the singing class at the Berlin University of the Arts. He was also a member of the senate of the Prussian Academy of Arts.

Schulze retired in autumn 1910, which he spent in Jena, where he died in April 1920 shortly before reaching the age of 85.
