= Karl Gustav Berndal =

German stage actor

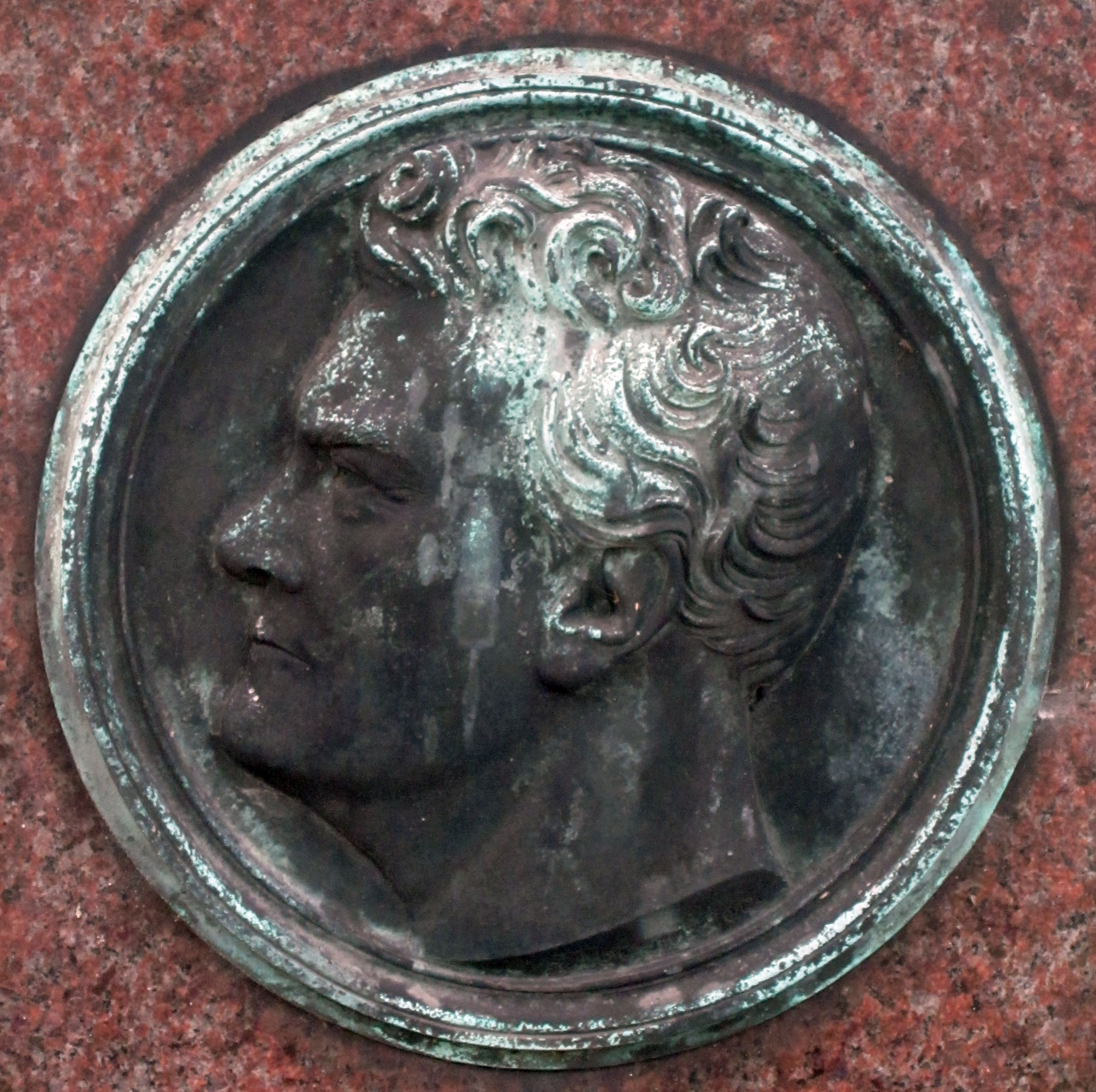
Karl Gustav Berndal (Portrait relief on the gravestone)

Karl Gustav Berndal, also Carl Gustav Berndal, (2 November 1830 – 30 July 1885) was a German stage actor.

== Life ==
Born in Berlin, Berndal was accepted in July 1848 as a young 18-year-old pupil of the court theatre, but was released the following year. First he stayed in Berlin and played in the first and oldest amateur theatre in Berlin, the Urania. In April 1851, director Woltersdorf engaged him for Königsberg.

In 1852, Berndal went to Szczecin, made a guest appearance at the Royal Theatre in Berlin in May 1853 in the class of young heroes and lovers and was engaged in May 1854 first for three, then for ten years and finally in 1866 for life. Already in 1855, Berndal changed to the older subject and after Hendrichs' departure in 1864, he became his representative in the heroic roles. In 1857, he gave guest roles in Leipzig and Mannheim, later also in Cologne, Magdeburg, Königsberg etc., everywhere with great recognition.

From 1863 to 1873, he was a lecturer for dramatic education and declamation at the Stern Conservatory. From 1873, he also worked as a teacher of declamation at the Royal Academy of Music in Berlin. From 1880 until 1882, he was president of the Guild of the German Stage.

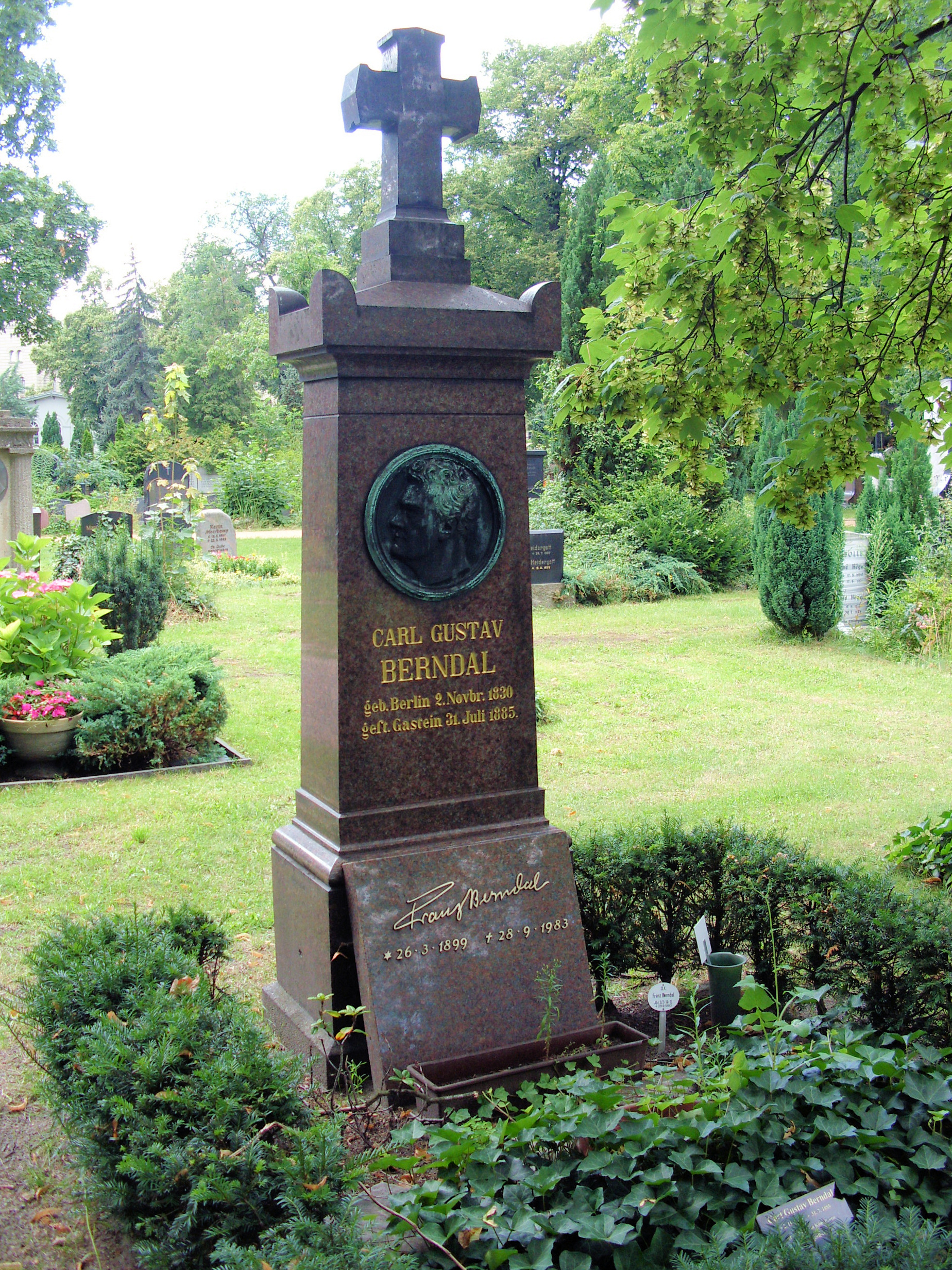
Grave of K. G. Berndal

In the last years of his life, Berndal's voice was so attacked that his playing suffered from it and he could give his characters less nuances. Nevertheless, it came as a surprise when, after only a short period of indisposition, he died on 30 July 1885 at the age of 54 during a journey in Gastein.

His grave is at Cemetery III of the Jerusalem and New Church in Berlin-Kreuzberg. The red granite pillar with cross-crowning has a bronze medallion with the portrait of the dead man in profile on the front, a work of Fritz Thomas.

== Roles ==
His sonorous voice, supported by a perfect, relaxed clarity of pronunciation, was able to adapt to the most varied situations. Among his best roles in the field of heroes were William Tell, Götz von Berlichingen, Karl Moor, Percy; im Fach der Charakterrollen spielte er den Baron von Burleigh, Wilhelm von Oranien, Präsident v. Walter, and Philipp II.

== Some students ==
- Jacques Burg, Julius Eyben, Laura Friedmann

== Work ==
- Karl Gustav Berndal: Ansichten über Errichtung einer dramatischen Hochschule. Berlin 1876.
