= Karl Blumauer =

Austrian theatre actor

Karl Blumauer, real name Johann Gottfried Bernhard, (1785 – 15 January 1841) was a theatre actor, singer (bass), and writer of children's literature from the Austrian Empire.

== Life ==
Born in Brünn, Blumauer was a celebrated performer at the time in Ifflandscher fathers' roles. He transferred his main activity to the Mannheim, Meininger and Weimar court theatres. At the time of the latter engagement, he drafted a plan for a general support fund for actors in association with the well-known actor Karl Ludwig Oels, with the aim of giving the stage members an independent position vis-à-vis the directors. The latter were extremely angry about this, so that they concluded a kind of tacit cartel among themselves to never engage Blumauer again. The artist was therefore forced to retire completely from the stage in 1835. He was also unable to continue his work as a director, in which he also did an excellent job, due to the boycott imposed on him. He was now occupied with literary work and made a name for himself as a writer for young people. He spent the last years of his life in Brno, where he died in 1841.

His daughter was the singer and actress Minona Frieb-Blumauer.
