= N. P. Osipov =

Russian writer and translator

Nikolay Petrovich Osipov
- Born: 1751; Saint Petersburg, Russian Empire
- Died: May 19, 1799 (aged 48) O.S. (May 30, 1838 N.S.); Saint Petersburg, Russian Empire

Nikolay Petrovich Osipov (Russian: Николай Петрович Осипов) (1751 in Saint Petersburg – 19 May [O.S. 30 May] 1799 in Saint Petersburg, Russian Empire) was a Russian writer, poet and translator. He is best known for his mock-heroic 1791 poem Aeneid Turned Inside Out (Russian: Виргилиева Энеида, вывороченная наизнанку, lit. 'Vergil's Aeneid, turned inside out') (Russian: Вирги́лиева Энеи́да, вы́вороченная наизна́нку; parts 5 and 6 were completed after his death by Aleksandr Kotelnitsky).

Osipov's Eneida is a parody of Virgil's Aeneid, where the Trojan heroes talk like 18th-century Russians.

== Osipov's Eneida (1791) and Kotliarevsky's Eneida (1798) ==
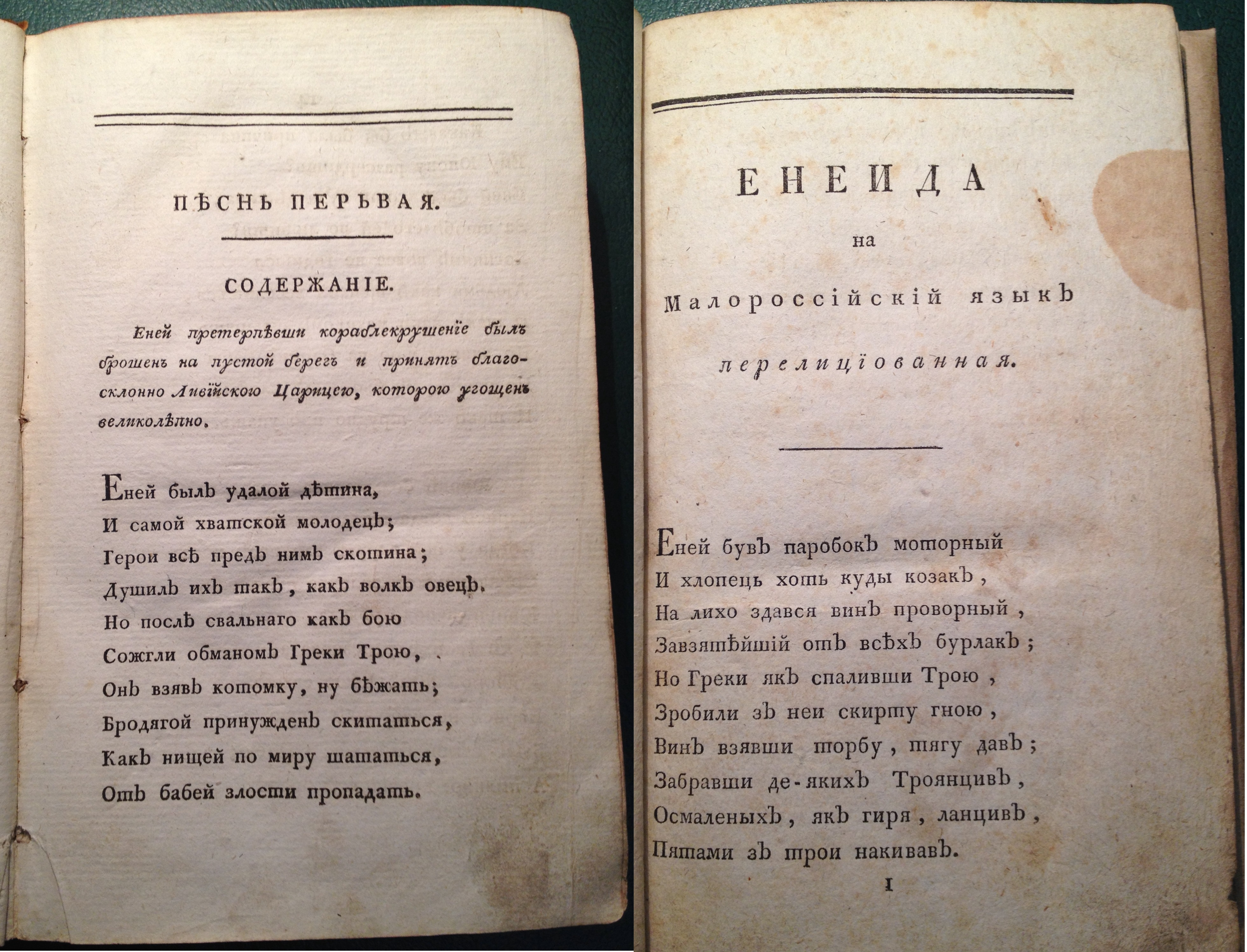
The first verses of Osipov's Eneida 1791 and Kotliarevsky's Eneida 1798

Osipov's Eneida was a model for Ivan Kotliarevsky’s seminal 1798 Ukrainian-language version, although the latter used a different setting and adopted a new verse form.
