= Aloys Blumauer =

Austrian poet

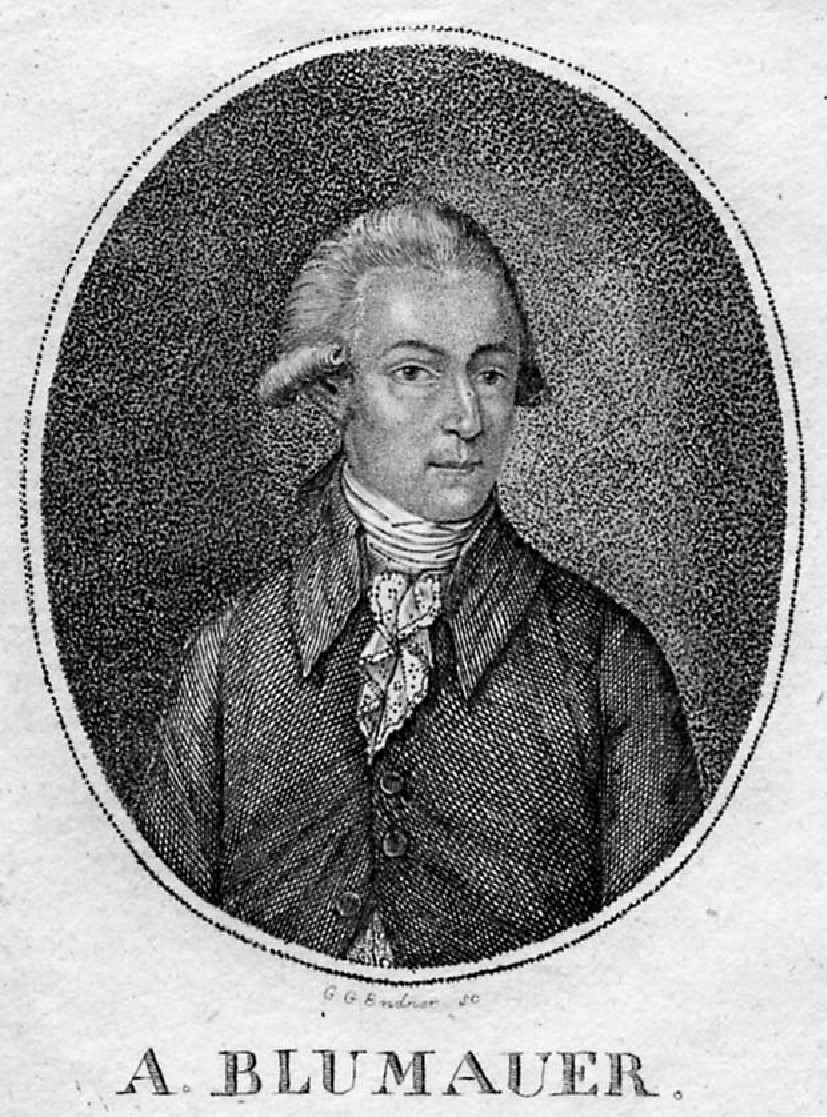
- engraving by Gustav Georg Endner
- Born: 22 December 1755
- Died: 16 March 1798 (aged 42)

Aloys Blumauer, also known as Alois Blumauer or Johannes Aloysius Blumauer, (21 or 22 December 1755 Steyr - 16 March 1798 Vienna) was an Austrian poet.

== Biography ==
His works, which are chiefly coarse satires on the clergy and on the Jesuits (of which he himself had become a member a year before its dissolution in 1773), enjoyed a wide popularity. He is remembered, however, chiefly for his Abenteuer des frommen Helden Æneas (1784–88; published with introduction and commentary by E. Griesbach, 1872), a coarse travesty on Virgil's Aeneid. His complete works (Sämmtliche Werke) appeared after his death in four volumes (1801–03; republished 1884). Blumauer was also an acquaintance of Wolfgang Amadeus Mozart, collaborating on the song "Lied der Freiheit" (KV. 506) with him in 1786.

== Sources ==
- Gilman, D. C.; Peck, H. T.; Colby, F. M., eds. (1905). "Blumauer, Aloys" . New International Encyclopedia (1st ed.). New York: Dodd, Mead. This work in turn cites:
  - Hofmann-Willenhof, Aloys Blumauer (Vienna, 1885)
