= John Bulteel (writer) =

English writer and translator

John Bulteel (c. 1627–1692) was an English writer and translator, cousin of John Bulteel, Member of Parliament. He was descended from French Huguenots.

== Works ==
Identifiable works of Bulteel include:

- Londons Triumph: or, The Solemn and Magnificent reception of that honourable gentleman, Robert Tichburn, Lord Major (1656). The reception was by Oliver Cromwell.
- Berinthea, a Romance (1664)
- Amorous Orontus, or The Love in Fashion (1665). Translation in heroic verse of L'Amour à la mode by Thomas Corneille.
- Rome exactly Described (1668). Translation of Relazione della corte romana fatta l'anno 1661, two discourses by Angelo Corraro (pseudonym of Charles de Ferrare du Tot), Venetian ambassador to Pope Alexander VII.
- A General Chronological History of France (1683). Translation of Abrégé chronologique de l'histoire de France by François Eudes de Mézeray.
- The Apophthegmes of the Ancients, taken out of Plutarch [...] and others, collected into one volume for the benefit and pleasure of the Ingenious (1683)

Tentative attribution:

- The Comical Romance (1665). Translation by J.B. of Le Roman comique by Paul Scarron.
- The Drudge: or, The Jealous Extravagant (1673). Translation by J.B. of Zélotide, histoire galante by René Le Pays.

== Notes ==
Attribution

This article incorporates text from a publication now in the public domain: Stephen, Leslie, ed. (1886). "Bulteel, John". Dictionary of National Biography. Vol. 7. London: Smith, Elder & Co.
